= Kid Creole and the Coconuts discography =

- Studio albums: 14
- Extended plays: 1
- Live albums: 1
- Compilation albums: 7
- Singles: 27

The discography of American musical group Kid Creole and the Coconuts created and led by August Darnell includes fourteen studio albums, one live album, seven compilations, one extended play and twenty-seven singles. The small discography of The Coconuts – Kid Creole's backing singers – consisting of two studio albums and three singles is included on this page.

== Studio albums ==
Year	Title	Chart positions										Certifications (sales thresholds)
Year	Title	US	US R&B	FR	GER	NL	NOR	NZ	SWE	SWI	U.K.	Certifications (sales thresholds)
1980	Off the Coast of Me: Labels: ZE Records, Island Records	–	–	–	–	–	–	–	–	–	–	
1981	Fresh Fruit in Foreign Places: Labels: ZE, Island, Sire Records	180	–	–	–	–	–	–	40	–	99	
1982	Tropical Gangsters: Labels: ZE, Island, Sire (released in the U.S. as Wise Guy)	145	43	9	18	6	18	6	22	–	3	UK: Platinum
1983	Doppelganger: Labels: ZE, Island, Sire	–	–	–	54	46	–	44	13	–	21	
1985	In Praise of Older Women... and Other Crimes: Labels: Sire	–	–	–	–	–	–	–	–	–	–	
1987	I, Too, Have Seen the Woods: Labels: Sire	–	–	–	–	–	–	–	–	–	–	
1990	Private Waters in the Great Divide: Labels: Columbia Records	–	–	–	–	56	–	–	–	39	–	
1991	You Shoulda Told Me You Were...: Labels: Columbia	–	–	–	–	–	–	–	–	–	–	
1993	KC2 Plays K2C: Labels: Sony (Japan only, collaboration with Kome Kome Club)	–	–	–	–	–	–	–	–	–	–	
1995	To Travel Sideways: Labels: Hot Productions	–	–	–	–	–	–	–	–	–	–	
1995	Kiss Me Before the Light Changes: Labels: Hot Productions	–	–	–	–	–	–	–	–	–	–	
1997	The Conquest of You: Labels: SPV Recordings	–	–	–	–	–	–	–	–	–	–	
2001	Too Cool to Conga!: Labels: BMG Ariola München GmbH	–	–	–	–	–	–	–	–	–	–	
2011	I Wake Up Screaming: Labels: Strut Records	–	–	–	–	–	–	–	–	–	–	

== Live albums ==
- Oh! What a Night (Prism Platinum, 2000)
- Live at the B-Spot (Esquires, 2016)

== Compilation albums ==
- Cre~Olé: The Best of Kid Creole & the Coconuts (ZE, Island, 1984) UK #21 (Re-released in 1993 with a bonus track)
- Kid Creole Redux (Sire, London, Rhino, 1992)
- Haiti (Viceroy Music Europe, 1996) (Compilation of tracks from 1995's To Travel Sideways and Kiss Me Before the Light Changes)
- Classic Kid Creole & The Coconuts - The Universal Masters Collection (Island, 1999)
- Wonderful Thing (Spectrum Records, 2000)
- The Ultimate Collection (CCM, 2003)
- Going Places: The August Darnell Years 1976-1983 (Strut Records, 2008) (Compilation of August Darnell's work with Kid Creole and the Coconuts, Dr. Buzzard's Original Savannah Band and production work)
- Kid Creole & The Coconuts: Anthology Vols. 1 & 2 (Rainman Records/RED, 2009) (Compilation of remixed and/or re-imagined Kid Creole and Dr. Buzzard's Original Savannah Band selections)
- Nothin' Left But The Rest (2C2C, 2021) (Reissue of August Darnell's 1996 solo album The Kid and I, with bonus tracks. This compilation was issued under the Kid Creole & The Coconuts band name, despite no musical participation from the Coconuts.)

== Extended plays ==
- Christmas in B'Dilly Bay with Kid Creole and the Coconuts (Island, 1982)^{[B]}

== Singles ==
Year	Title	Chart positions										Album
Year	Title	US Hot 100	US Club Play	US R&B	AUS	FR	GER	IRL	NL	NZ	UK	Album
1980	"He's Not Such a Bad Guy (After All)"	–	53^{[A]}	–	–	–	–	–	–	–	–	—
1980	"There But For the Grace of God Go I"	–	53^{[A]}	–	–	–	–	–	–	–	–	—
1980	"Maladie D'Amour"	–	53^{[A]}	–	–	–	–	–	–	–	–	Off the Coast Of Me
1980	"Que Pasa" / "Me No Pop I"^{[B]}	–	–	–	–	–	–	–	48	–	32	Mutant Disco: A Subtle Discolation of the Norm
1981	"Latin Music"	–	–	–	–	–	–	–	–	–	–	Fresh Fruit in Foreign Places
1981	"I Am"	–	–	–	–	–	–	–	–	–	76	Fresh Fruit in Foreign Places
1981	"Going Places" ^{[C]}	–	51^{[C]}	–	–	–	–	–	–	–	–	Fresh Fruit in Foreign Places
1982	"I'm a Wonderful Thing, Baby"	–	18^{[E]}	44	82	–	–	–	21	49	4	Tropical Gangsters/Wise Guy
1982	"Stool Pigeon"	–	25	–	–	–	–	15	19	8	7	Tropical Gangsters/Wise Guy
1982	"Annie, I'm Not Your Daddy"	–	18^{[E]}	–	89	–	45	4	4	13	2	Tropical Gangsters/Wise Guy
1982	"Dear Addy" ^{[F]}	–	–	–	–	–	–	22	–	–	29	Fresh Fruit in Foreign Places
1983	"There's Something Wrong in Paradise"	–	–	–	–	–	–	29	–	–	35	Doppelganger
1983	"If You Wanna Be Happy"	–	–	–	–	–	–	–	–	–	–	Doppelganger
1983	"The Lifeboat Party"	–	–	–	–	–	–	–	49	–	49	Doppelganger
1984	"My Male Curiosity"	110	23	–	–	–	–	–	–	–	83	Against All Odds (soundtrack)
1984	"Don't Take My Coconuts"^{[D]}	–	–	–	–	–	–	–	–	–	86	Cre~Olé - The Best of Kid Creole and the Coconuts
1985	"Caroline Was a Drop-Out"	–	–	–	–	–	–	–	–	–	–	In Praise of Older Women and Other Crimes
1985	"Endicott"	–	21	–	–	28	–	–	28	–	80	In Praise of Older Women and Other Crimes
1987	"Dancing at the Bain Douches"	–	–	–	–	–	–	–	–	–	–	I, Too, Have Seen The Woods
1988	"Hey Mambo" (with Barry Manilow)	90	–	–	–	–	20	–	16	–	–	Swing Street (Barry Manilow album)
1988	"Pepito"	–	–	–	–	24	–	–	–	–	–	—
1989	"People Will Talk"	–	–	–	–	–	–	–	–	–	–	New York Stories (soundtrack)
1990	"The Sex of It"	–	19	85	–	–	–	–	31	–	29	Private Waters in the Great Divide
1990	"I Love Girls"	–	29	–	–	–	–	–	–	–	–	Private Waters in the Great Divide
1991	"(She's A) Party Girl"	–	–	–	–	–	–	–	–	–	–	You Shoulda Told Me You Were...
1993	"I'm a Wonderful Thing, Baby (Brothers In Rhythm Remix)"	–	–	–	–	–	–	–	–	–	60	Cre~Olé - The Best of Kid Creole and the Coconuts (Re-issue)
1997	"UFO"	–	–	–	–	–	–	–	–	–	–	—
2011	"I Do Believe"	–	–	–	–	–	–	–	–	–	–	I Wake Up Screaming

Notes

- A"He's Not Such a Bad Guy (After All)", "There But For the Grace of God Go I" and "Maladie D'Amour" charted together as a triple-sided single on the Billboard Hot Dance Club Play chart.
- B"Que pasa" / "Me No Pop I" is credited as 'Kid Creole and the Coconuts presents Coati Mundi'. It was originally released in 1980 on Antilles Records before being re-released on ZE/Island and charting in the summer of 1981.
- C"Going Places (Zemix)" charted as a triple-sided single on the Billboard Hot Dance Club Play chart together with "In the Jungle" and "Table Manners".
- D"Don't Take My Coconuts was originally released in 1983, on the Coconuts album "Don't Take My Coconuts", before being released as a single in 1984, to promote the compilation Cre~Olé - The Best of Kid Creole and the Coconuts.
- E"I'm a Wonderful Thing, Baby", "I'm Corrupt" and "Annie, I'm Not Your Daddy" charted together on the Billboard Hot Dance Club Play chart.
- F"Dear Addy" is sometimes credited as the lead song on the EP Christmas in B'Dilly Bay with Kid Creole and the Coconuts.

== The Coconuts ==
Kid Creole wrote and produced an album for his backing singers 'The Coconuts' in 1983. The three-piece consisted of Adriana Kaegi, Cheryl Poirier and Taryn Hagey. A second album was released in Japan in 1991.

Studio albums

- Don't Take My Coconuts (EMI America, 1983)
- Killer Bees (Creole/Nippon Columbia, 1991)

Singles

- "Did You Have to Love Me Like You Did" b/w "Hats Off to Citizen K" (1983) UK #60
- "Ticket to the Tropics" b/w "Kriminal-Tango" (1983)
- "If I Only Had a Brain" b/w "Indiscreet" (1983) US #108

== August Darnell as producer ==
Studio albums

- Dr. Buzzard's Original Savannah Band – Meets King Pennett (RCA, 1978) (associate producer)
- Aural Exciters - Spooks in Space (ZE, 1979)
- Gichy Dan's Beachwood # 9 - Gichy Dan's Beachwood # 9 (RCA, 1979)
- Machine - Machine (RCA, 1979)
- Cristina - Cristina (aka Doll in the Box) (ZE, 1980)
- Funkapolitan - Funkapolitan (London, 1982)
- The Coconuts - Don't Take My Coconuts (EMI America, 1983)
- Elbow Bones and the Racketeers – New York At Dawn (EMI America, 1983)

Singles

- James White and The Blacks - "Contort Yourself" (ZE, 1979)
- Cristina - "Is That All There Is?" (ZE, 1980)
