= Kid Creole Redux =

Compilation album by Kid Creole and the Coconuts
- Released: March 1992
- Recorded: 1979–1987
- Genre: New wave, disco
- Label: Sire Records, London, Rhino
- Producer: August Darnell

Kid Creole and the Coconuts chronology
You Shoulda Told Me You Were... (1991)	Kid Creole Redux (1992)	KC2 Plays K2C (1993)

Professional ratings
Review scores
Source	Rating
Allmusic	4.5/5 stars
The Village Voice	B+

Kid Creole Redux is the second compilation album released by American musical group Kid Creole and the Coconuts. It was released in 1992.

== Track listing ==
All tracks are written by August Darnell; except where indicated.

No.	Title	Writer(s)	Album	Length
1.	"I'm a Wonderful Thing, Baby"	Peter Schott, Darnell	Tropical Gangsters/Wise Guy, 1982	5:15
2.	"Endicott"		In Praise of Older Women... and Other Crimes, 1985	4:25
3.	"There's Something Wrong in Paradise"	Darnell, Mark Mazur	Doppelganger, 1983	3:20
4.	"If You Wanna Be Happy"	Frank Guida, Carmella Guida, Joseph Royster	Doppelganger, 1983	2:23
5.	"Stool Pigeon"		Tropical Gangsters/Wise Guy, 1982	4:59
6.	"Annie, I'm Not Your Daddy"		Tropical Gangsters/Wise Guy, 1982	6:13
7.	"Yolanda"		Off the Coast of Me, 1980	4:23
8.	"It's a Wonderful Life"	Andy Hernandez	Doppelganger, 1983	3:12
9.	"Dancin' at the Bains Douches"		I, Too, Have Seen the Woods, 1987	5:25
10.	"In the Jungle"		Fresh Fruit in Foreign Places, 1981	3:09
11.	"Animal Crackers"	Darnell, Giampietro Fanero	Fresh Fruit in Foreign Places, 1981	3:33
12.	"Part of My Design"		I, Too, Have Seen the Woods, 1987	3:33
13.	"Call it a Day"		I, Too, Have Seen the Woods, 1987	4:00
14.	"The Lifeboat Party"	Darnell, Ron Rogers	Doppelganger, 1983	2:34
