= In Praise of Older Women... and Other Crimes =

Studio album by Kid Creole and the Coconuts
- Released: 1985
- Studio: Electric Lady Studios, New York City; Daily Planet Studios, New York City; Tetsu Studios
- Genre: New wave, disco
- Length: 38:58
- Label: Sire
- Producer: August Darnell

Kid Creole and the Coconuts chronology
Cre~Olé: The Best of Kid Creole & the Coconuts (1984)	In Praise of Older Women... and Other Crimes (1985)	I, Too, Have Seen the Woods (1987)

Singles from In Praise of Older Women... and Other Crimes
- 1. "Caroline Was a Drop-Out" b/w "You Can't Keep A Good Man Down" Released: 1985; 2. "Endicott" b/w "Dowopsalsaboprock" Released: June 1985

In Praise of Older Women... and Other Crimes is the fifth studio album released by the American musical group Kid Creole and the Coconuts. It was released in 1985 and includes the singles "Endicott" and "Caroline Was a Drop-Out". The album and its lead single "Caroline Was a Drop-Out" did not chart in any territory, but the second single "Endicott" became one of the group's better known songs in the US, where it peaked at No. 21 on the Hot Dance Club Play chart. The single also reached the top 30 in France and the Netherlands.

"You Can't Keep a Good Man Down" is a remake of the Gichy Dan's Beachwood #9 song from their self-titled 1979 album. The original recording was written and co-produced by Darnell. Gichy Dan also provides backing vocals on In Praise of Older Women... and Other Crimes.

== Reception ==
Professional ratings
Review scores
Source	Rating
AllMusic	2.5/5 stars
Sounds	2.5/5 stars
The Village Voice	A−

In Praise of Older Women... and Other Crimes received mixed reviews from critics. Zach Curd writing for AllMusic gave the album a mixed review. He calls the album a weaker example of the "disco/calypso/funk/Latin" genres. He also describes the album overall as entertaining, humorous, fun, and worth buying for the feel-good, "Endicott".

In a positive review, Robert Christgau, writing for The Village Voice, positively compares Darnell to Cole Porter and hails him for maintaining a consistent level of lyrical sophistication that in the rock or musical comedy genres. He does, however, criticize the amount of brittle satire on the album. Christgau also singles out Andy Hernandez's attack on white-collar crime "Dowopsalsaboprock".

== Track listing ==
All tracks are written by August Darnell and Stony Browder Jr.; except where indicated.

Side one
No.	Title	Writer(s)	Length
1.	"Endicott"	Darnell	4:25
2.	"Particul'y Int'rested"		4:06
3.	"Name It"		3:48
4.	"(Darlin' You Can) Take Me"		4:06
5.	"Luv Got Me Dancen' On My Kneez"	Andy Hernandez	3:02

Side two
No.	Title	Writer(s)	Length
6.	"Caroline Was a Drop-Out"		3:55
7.	"He Can Have You"		3:31
8.	"The Animal Cop"	Darnell	3:46
9.	"Dowopsalsaboprock"	Hernandez	3:50
10.	"You Can't Keep a Good Man Down"	Darnell	4:29

== Personnel ==
Performer credits

- Adriana Kaegi, Cheryl Poirier, Taryn Hagey – The Coconuts
- Bongo Eddie, Carol Colman, Charlie Lagond, Coati Mundi, Dave Span, Jimmy Rippetoe (A Parttime Student Who Comes & Goes At Whim), Ken Fradley, King Creole (Self-Appointed In Feb. This Year), Lee Robertson (The Professor), Mark Mazur, Peter Schott, Ronnie Rogers – The Band, as it exists in the year of 1985
- Ken Fradley – trumpet solo (3)
- Charlie Lagond – solo (6)
- St Winifred's School Choir – choir (10)
- Cory Daye – lead vocal harmonies and interjections
- Dutch Robinson, Lori Mosher – additional background vocals
- Carolyn Browder, Gichy Dan – provided additional background vocals
- Sugar-Coated Andy Hernandez (2, 4, 5, 9), Carlos Franzetti (1, 5), Ken Fradley (8) – horn arrangements

Technical credits

- August Darnell – producer
- Carol Colman – production coordinator
- Joe Barbaria (1-4, 6–8, 10) – engineer
- Julian McBrowne (5, 9) – engineer
- Michel Sauvage (1-4, 6–8, 10) – assistant engineer
- Tim Purvis (5, 9) - assistant engineer
- Argyle Kneft and Steven Stanley (1-6), Argyle Kneft, Coati Mundi and Julian McBrowne (5, 9), Augie and Joe-Bob (7, 8, 10) – mixing
- Bob Ludwig – mastering
- John Rynski – art direction
- Donald Schneider – artwork
- Iksmir Noj – rear cover

== Charts ==
"Endicott"

Chart (1985)	Peak position
Canadian singles (RPM Top 100)	88
Dutch Singles (Dutch Top 40)	28
French Singles (SNEP)	28
UK Singles (OCC)	80
US Billboard Hot Dance Club Play	21
