= I, Too, Have Seen the Woods =

Studio album by Kid Creole and the Coconuts
- Released: 1987
- Studio: New York City at a studio on West 46th Street (#151–Ground Floor)
- Genre: New wave, disco
- Length: 40:26
- Label: Sire
- Producer: August Darnell, Ronnie Rogers, Coati Mundi

Kid Creole and the Coconuts chronology
In Praise of Older Women... and Other Crimes (1985)	I, Too, Have Seen the Woods (1987)	Private Waters in the Great Divide (1990)

Singles from I, Too, Have Seen the Woods
- 1. "Dancing at the Bain Douches" b/w "Midsummer Madness (The Refrain)" Released: 1987

I, Too, Have Seen the Woods is the sixth studio album released by the American musical group Kid Creole and the Coconuts. It was released in 1987 and includes the single "Dancing at the Bain Douches".

== Reception ==
Professional ratings
Review scores
Source	Rating
AllMusic	2/5 stars
The Rolling Stone Album Guide	1.5/5 stars
The Village Voice	A−

I, Too, Have Seen the Woods received mixed reviews from critics. In a negative review, AllMusic's Vince Ripol described the group as artistically stranded. He wrote that the band was still capable of brilliant moments, but that the album lacked the focused direction of prior efforts like Fresh Fruit in Foreign Places and the group's tour de force, Wise Guy. He describes Darnell as too clever for his own good, but does single out "Dancin' at the Bains Douches" for setting a standard that the surrounding material fails to meet, although "Agony...Ecstasy" and "Call It a Day" are close runners-up.

In a positive review, Robert Christgau, in The Village Voice, praises Darnell for his consistency and calls the album a typically elegant and literate dance album in which mortality impinges attractively.

== Track listing ==
All tracks are written by August Darnell; except where indicated.

Side one (The Beginning)
No.	Title	Writer(s)	Length
1.	"Buttermilk Channel"		1:58
2.	"Part of My Design"		3:33
3.	"Agony...Ecstasy"	Darnell, Peter Schott, William Shakespeare	3:23
4.	"Dancin' at the Bains Douches"		5:25
5.	"El Hijo"	C. M. A. Hernandez	4:17
6.	"Cold Wave"		0:43

Side two (The End)
No.	Title	Writer(s)	Length
7.	"So Far So Good"	Darnell, Ron Rogers	4:46
8.	"Midsummer Madness"		4:24
9.	"Consider Me"	Darnell, Schott	3:37
10.	"Boxed Out"	Hernandez	3:40
11.	"Call it a Day"		4:00

== Personnel ==
The Kid

- King Creole – lead vocals, guitar, bass, percussion

The Coconuts

- Adriana Kaegi – background vocals, sweet inspiration
- Bongo Eddie – percussion
- Carol Colman – bass
- Cheryl Poirier – background vocals
- Coati Mundi – lead vocals, vibes, social work and psychiatric counseling for all band members
- Coffee Keeps – background vocals
- Dave Span – drums
- Eugene Grey – guitar
- Haitia Fuller – introducing, female lead vocals
- Janique Swedberg – background vocals
- Jimmy Rippetoe – guitar
- Peter Schott – synthetic and real keyboards, bass synth

Pond Life orchestra

- Charlie Lagond – saxophones, clarinets, flutes
- Ken Fradley – trumpets, flugel horns
- Lee Robertson (The Professor) – trombones, French horns

The Dayenites

- Cory Daye, Gichy Dan, Lourdes Cotto – background vocals

Special performances rendered

- Andy González, Djonebe Muflet, Herman Olivera, Jay Stovall, Lourdes Cotto, Peter Brown, Ronnie Rogers

Technical credits

- August Darnell – producer
- Ronnie Rogers – producer (7)
- Coati Mundi – producer (5, 10)
- Carol Colman – production co-ordination
- Dave Wittman, Michel Sauvage, Steven Stanley – mixing
- Clive Smith – programming (Fairlight Sessions)
- Michel Sauvage – engineering (1–4, 6 to 9, 11)
- Julian McBrowne – engineering (5, 10)
- Judy Kirschner – assistant engineer
- Bob Ludwig – mastering
- Janet Perr – art director
- Albert Sanchez – photographer
- Adriana Kaegi – cover design
- Andreas Bernhardt – hair and make-up

== Charts ==
=== Singles ===
Year	Single	Chart	Position
1987	"Dancin' at the Bains Douches"	Italy Airplay (Music & Media)	7
