= Private Waters in the Great Divide =

Album by Kid Creole and the Coconuts

Studio album by Kid Creole and the Coconuts
- Released: March 1990
- Genre: Disco funk
- Label: Columbia
- Producer: August Darnell

Kid Creole and the Coconuts chronology
I, Too, Have Seen the Woods (1987)	Private Waters in the Great Divide (1990)	You Shoulda Told Me You Were... (1991)

Singles from Private Waters in the Great Divide
- 1. "The Sex of It" b/w "He's Takin' the Rap" Released: 19 March 1990; 2. "I Love Girls" Released: 13 August 1990

Private Waters in the Great Divide is the seventh studio album by the American musical group Kid Creole and the Coconuts, released in 1990. It includes the singles "The Sex of It" and "I Love Girls".

== Production ==
The album was the band's first for Columbia Records. Always more popular in Europe, Kid Creole's August Darnell was asked by the label to try to create an album that would appeal to the American market. After an estrangement, Darnell had started speaking to his brother and former Dr. Buzzard's Original Savannah Band's bandmate, Stony Browder, during the recording of the album, and asked him to play keyboards. Prince wrote "The Sex of It", the demo tape of which he mailed to Darnell; the two did not collaborate in person. Coati Mundi had left the band by the time production began.

== Critical reception ==
Professional ratings
Review scores
Source	Rating
AllMusic	3/5 stars
Calgary Herald	B+
The Encyclopedia of Popular Music	2/5 stars
The Rolling Stone Album Guide	2.5/5 stars
Spin Alternative Record Guide	6/10
The Village Voice	B+

Trouser Press wrote: "Showing tons more imagination and inspiration, Darnell bounced back [from I, Too, Have Seen the Woods] to full artistic strength with the marvelously entertaining Private Waters in the Great Divide, a diverse party of singular wit and intelligence." The Edmonton Journal called Private Waters in the Great Divide "an album that captures everything worthwhile and unique about [Darnell's] hard-working funk band."

== Track listing ==
All tracks are written by August Darnell; except where indicated.

Side one
No.	Title	Writer(s)	Length
1.	"I Love Girls"		3:46
2.	"(No More) Casual Sex"	Stony Browder Jr., Darnell	3:19
3.	"The Sex of It"	Prince	3:32
4.	"Cory's Song"	Browder Jr., Darnell	4:17
5.	"Dr. Paradise"		4:38
6.	"Takin' a Holiday"		0:39
7.	"Lambada"	Chico De Oliveira	3:37

Side two
No.	Title	Writer(s)	Length
8.	"Funky Audrey and the Coconut Rag"	Darnell, Carol Coleman, Andy Hernandez	4:13
9.	"When Lucy Does the Boomerang"		3:50
10.	"He's Takin' the Rap"		3:49
11.	"Pardon My Appearance"	Darnell, Peter Schott	3:15
12.	"Laughing with Our Backs Against the Wall"		6:18
13.	"My Love"		1:09

== Charts ==
Chart (1990)	Peak position
Dutch Albums (Album Top 100)	56
Swiss Albums (Swiss Hitparade)	39
