= To Travel Sideways =

Studio album by Kid Creole and the Coconuts
- Released: May 1995
- Recorded: Curreriville, Planet Sound, Studio 4, Sigma Sound, Shandow Sound, Sound Ideas, Giant Studios, East Side Sound
- Genre: New wave, disco
- Length: 56:26
- Label: Hot Productions
- Producer: August Darnell, Charles Ibgui

Kid Creole and the Coconuts chronology
KC2 Plays K2C (1993)	To Travel Sideways (1995)	Kiss Me Before the Light Changes (1995)

To Travel Sideways is the tenth studio album released by the American musical group Kid Creole and the Coconuts. It was the first of two albums released by the group in 1995.

== Reception ==
Professional ratings
Review scores
Source	Rating
Allmusic	2.5/5 stars
The Village Voice	*

== Track listing ==
All tracks are written by August Darnell; except where indicated.

No.	Title	Writer(s)	Length
1.	"I Let it Slide"		5:22
2.	"You Shoulda Told Me You Were Catholic"		5:21
3.	"Gorgeous"		4:09
4.	"Things We Said Today"	Lennon–McCartney	4:27
5.	"Baby, I'm Real"		4:23
6.	"Callin' Out to Marlboro"	Darnell, Ron Rogers	4:37
7.	"The Anniversary Medley" ("Annie, I'm Not Your Daddy"/"Stool Pigeon"/"Endicott"/"What a Work of Art a Man Is"/"My Male Curiosity")	Darnell, Karen Smallwood	8:35
8.	"Get Together"	Chet Powers	4:23
9.	"Runnin' Out of Scapegoats"		3:47
10.	"Abu"		4:03
11.	"What a Work of Art a Man Is"	Darnell, Smallwood	4:33
12.	"Life is Always Good"	Darnell, Stony Browder Jr.	2:46
