= The Forbidden Dance =

1990 film by Greydon Clark

- Theatrical release poster
- Directed by: Greydon Clark
- Screenplay by: Roy Langsdon; John Platt
- Story by: Menahem Golan
- Produced by: Menaham Golan; Richard L. Albert; Marc S. Fischer
- Starring: Laura Harring; Jeff James; Sid Haig; Richard Lynch
- Cinematography: R. Michael Stringer
- Edited by: Robert Edwards; Barry Seybert; Earl Watson
- Music by: Vladimir Horunzhy
- Production company: 21st Century Film Corporation
- Distributed by: Columbia Pictures
- Release date: March 16, 1990
- Running time: 97 minutes
- Country: United States
- Language: English
- Box office: $1,823,154

The Forbidden Dance (also known by its full promotional title The Forbidden Dance is Lambada) is a 1990 American drama film starring former Miss USA Laura Harring in her first major acting role. It was produced by Menahem Golan's 21st Century Film Corporation as a quick attempt to capitalize on the brief but intense Lambada dance craze that had swept parts of the U.S. following the release of the song "Lambada" by the French-Brazilian pop group Kaoma.

The story follows Nisa, a princess of an indigenous Brazilian tribe, who travels to Los Angeles in a desperate attempt to stop a powerful corporation from destroying her homeland's rainforest. Bringing the Lambada dance with her as a symbol of her culture, Nisa becomes involved with Jason, a young American dancer. Together they try to raise awareness about the destruction of the rainforest through their dance, culminating in a high-stakes Lambada competition.

The Forbidden Dance was released on the exact same day—March 16, 1990—as a rival Lambada-themed film simply titled Lambada, produced by Golan's former partner and cousin, Yoram Globus, through Cannon Films. The simultaneous releases sparked interest in their behind-the-scenes rivalry, but neither film was well-received critically or commercially. Nevertheless, The Forbidden Dance gained a cult following over time thanks to its over-the-top plot, early 90s aesthetic, and frequent television airings.

== Plot ==
Nisa is a native princess from a northern Brazilian tribe who travels to Los Angeles to stop an American corporation from destroying her rainforest home. Accompanying her is the tribal shaman Joa, who uses black magic to bypass the corporation's guards and confront its chairman, leading to his arrest.

Alone in Los Angeles, Nisa finds work in a Beverly Hills mansion with the help of a woman named Carmen. She becomes a servant for a strict couple whose son, Jason, lives to dance. After secretly watching Nisa dance in her room, Jason takes her to a club. There, she is rejected by his friends, and Jason is scolded by his parents for dating someone from the staff.

Nisa leaves and takes a job at Xtasy, a seedy nightclub and brothel, working as a dance partner for male customers. When Jason's friends visit the club and try to dance with her, Nisa refuses. One of them becomes aggressive, and she defends herself. Later, the group tells Jason's girlfriend, Ashley, who accuses Nisa of being a sleaze. Jason distances himself from his friends and Ashley, then goes to Xtasy to rescue Nisa. A bouncer assaults him and attempts to force himself on Nisa, but Joa arrives and uses magic to incapacitate the attacker, clearing the venue.

Joa returns to the tribe, while Nisa and Jason, now in love, prepare for a televised dance contest, hoping to use the platform to raise awareness about the destruction of the rainforest.

They win the contest, but the corporation's enforcer, Benjamin Maxwell, kidnaps Nisa. Jason rescues her but injures his ankle, threatening their chance to perform on the show. Just in time, Joa reappears backstage and magically heals Jason. The performance goes ahead, the audience embraces them, Nisa's father joins them on stage, a boycott is launched against the corporation, and everyone celebrates with the Lambada.

== Cast ==
- Laura Harring as Nisa
- Jeff James as Jason Anderson
- Angela Moya as Carmen
- Sid Haig as Joa
- Shannon Farnon as Katherine Anderson
- Linden Chiles as Bradley Anderson
- Pilar Del Rey as Queen
- Ruben Moreno as King
- Barbra Brighton as Ashley Wells
- Richard Lynch as Benjamin Maxwell
- Miranda Garrison as Mickey
- Tom Alexander as Kurt
- Connie Woods as Trish
- Steven Williams as Weed
- Remy O'Neil as Robin
- Charles Meshack as Eddie
- Sabrina Mance as Cami
- Kenny Johnson as Dave
- Adriana Kaegi as herself
- Kid Creole as himself

== Production ==
The Forbidden Dance was written, produced and released very quickly, in order to cash in on what some thought was a Lambada dance craze. The script was commissioned on December 7, 1989, by Sawmill Entertainment and producer Richard L. Albert, after he had seen Kaoma perform the song "Lambada" in Los Angeles. The script was written in about ten days, and filming began within a month. Albert's Sawmill Entertainment hired the same writers and director recently employed in making the suspense film Sight Unseen, starring Susan Blakely.

The Forbidden Dance was shot on 35mm film, in and around Los Angeles, California, and was completed when a color-corrected answer print and other film elements were delivered to Columbia Pictures on March 15, 1990. Editing went on around the clock, with two separate crews of editors working while the film was being shot. Two choreographers were hired, Miranda Garrison and Felix Chavez, and the work apportioned between them. Film critic Roger Ebert visited the set during filming, as news was publicized on how fast a major-studio film could be produced. The film featured the 1989 song "Lambada" (performed by the group Kaoma), which became involved in the Lambada dance craze.

The Forbidden Dance was released on March 16, 1990, the same day as rival film Lambada – whose producers brought an action before the MPAA title registry to block the use of the word 'Lambada' in the title. Notwithstanding that attempt, posters went up in New York before the release promoting Lambada in large type followed by the tag-line 'is the Forbidden Dance', with a picture of Laura Harring and Jeff James dancing in the rain forest.

== Release and reception ==
The film was panned by critics and received little attention in the theaters. Opening in 637 theaters, it grossed $720,864. By the end of the theatrical run, it grossed $1,823,154.

The Forbidden Dance received largely negative reviews, and currently holds a 23% on Rotten Tomatoes with an average score of 2.77/10. The film was also nominated for Worst Picture at the 1990 Stinkers Bad Movie Awards. Jon Pareles, of The New York Times, summed up The Forbidden Dance as "B-movie drab, with its dance sequences barely sexier than a bowling tournament", while Rita Kempley, in The Washington Post was to say "heavy-handed and somewhat mean-spirited, The Forbidden Dance is a slap-dash message movie, about as subtle as a clog dance."

Critics also considered The Forbidden Dance to be the worse of the two rival lambada movies, and the film grossed less than Lambada during its theatrical run. However, years after the release, the film finally found a cult following, especially after continuous re-runs on television and being sampled on the album Rainha do Gueto by pop singer Jully Luz.

== Soundtrack ==
1. Chorando Se Foi (Lambada) - Kaoma
2. Lambada A La Creole - Kid Creole and the Coconuts, featuring Cory Daye
3. It's Automatic - Kid Creole and the Coconuts
4. My Soul Intention (It's a Horror!)" - Kid Creole and The Coconuts
5. You and Me Alone - Mendy Lee
6. Lambada: The Forbidden Dance - José Feliciano
7. Always You - Joyce Kennedy
8. Limba Limba Lambada - Reginaldo Pi
9. Capoeira - The Dream Machine
10. BH Disco - Bob Midoff
11. Good Girls Like Bad Boys - Victor Moreno
12. Hand To Hold You Over - Mara Getz
13. Last Lover - Gene Evaro
14. Reaction To Passion - Gene Evaro
15. It's Never Too Late - Jeff Harper
16. Stop, Listen, Look & Think - Exposé

=== Original score ===
(Music by Vladimir Horunzhy)

1. Carmen Meets Nisa
2. Joa In Jail
3. Scene At Jason's House
4. Nisa and Jason In Bed
5. Nisa On Hollywood Boulevard
6. Jungle I
7. Jungle II
8. Nisa's Lifestory
9. Joa With Shaka
10. Maxwell Clears Jungle
11. Jungle III
12. Nisa Is Gone I
13. Nisa Is Gone II
14. Nisa and Jason's Getaway
15. Joa Gotten Free
16. Jason Fight In Extasy Club
17. Joa Goes Back
18. Nisa and Jason
19. Nisa and Mickey In Brothel
20. Nisa and Maxwell At Warehouse
21. Quarrel Between Jason and His Dad
22. Bonus Track
