= Doppelganger (Kid Creole and the Coconuts album) =

- Cover photography by Peter Ashworth

Studio album by Kid Creole and the Coconuts
- Released: September 1983
- Studio: Electric Lady Studios, New York City; Daily Planet Studios, New York City
- Genre: Latin, funk, tropical
- Length: 38:23
- Label: ZE; Island; Sire
- Producer: August Darnell, "Sugar Coated" Andy Hernandez

Kid Creole and the Coconuts chronology
Tropical Gangsters/Wise Guy (1982)	Doppelganger (1983)	Cre~Olé: The Best of Kid Creole & the Coconuts (1984)

Singles from Doppelganger
- 1. "There's Something Wrong in Paradise" b/w "Fireside Story (Fireside Chat)" Released: September 1983; 2. "If You Wanna Be Happy" b/w "The Seven Year Itch" Released: October 1983 (US only); 3. "The Lifeboat Party" b/w "Gina Gina" Released: November 1983

Doppelganger is the fourth studio album by Kid Creole and the Coconuts, released in 1983. The album was a relative commercial and critical disappointment following the group's most popular album Tropical Gangsters/Wise Guy. The album was released on LP and cassette in September 1983 and peaked at #21 in the UK, and to moderate success throughout Europe but did not chart in the US. The album includes the singles "There's Something Wrong in Paradise", "The Lifeboat Party", and in the US "If You Wanna Be Happy". It was reissued by Universal Island Records with bonus tracks added to album in 2002.

The album includes two covers, "If You Wanna Be Happy" originally recorded by Jimmy Soul in 1963, and a remake of "The Seven Year Itch", a song by August Darnell's previous band Dr. Buzzard's Original Savannah Band. "The Seven Year Itch" was originally released on their third album Dr. Buzzard's Original Savannah Band Goes to Washington in 1979. Doppelganger also marked the renewal of Darnell's collaboration with his older brother Stony Browder Jr. Four songs including "The Seven Year Itch" were co-written by the brothers.

== Critical reception ==
Professional ratings
Review scores
Source	Rating
AllMusic	3/5 stars
The Village Voice	A−

Doppelganger received mixed reviews from critics. Vince Ripol describes the album as entertaining, provided listeners have the prerequisite of an acquired taste for the bizarre, often comical travelogues set to exotic pop which represent the essence of Kid Creole & the Coconuts. The album is compared unfavourably to the group's previous hit album Tropical Gangsters/Wise Guy noting that nothing on Doppelganger can compare to "Annie, I'm Not Your Daddy" and "I'm a Wonderful Thing, Baby", yet nothing will fail to satisfy devoted fans either. For the uninitiated, Doppelganger's peculiar content presents a love-it or hate-it dilemma.

Robert Christgau writing for The Village Voice rated the album A−. He calls the album a return to the musical comedy stage for yet another original-cast recording after his previous (and best) album some which Darnell called some kind of sellout because it's held together by a dance groove. Christgau also praises the apparently surface wit of the Kid's lyrical-musical synthesis-pastiche but wants to clarify just what these songs are about.

== Track listing ==
Side one
No.	Title	Writer(s)	Length
1.	"The Lifeboat Party"	August Darnell, Ronnie Rogers (a/k/a Ron Rogers)	2:38
2.	"Underachiever"	Darnell	3:15
3.	"If You Wanna Be Happy"	Frank Guida, Carmela Guida, Joseph Royster	2:29
4.	"Distractions"	Darnell, The Coconuts, Peter Schott	2:56
5.	"Survivors"	Andy Hernandez	3:32
6.	"Call Me The Entertainer"	Darnell, Stony Browder Jr.	3:23

Side two
No.	Title	Writer(s)	Length
7.	"There's Something Wrong In Paradise"	Darnell, Mark Mazur	3:22
8.	"It's A Wonderful Life"	Hernandez	3:12
9.	"Bongo Eddie's Lament"	Darnell	3:02
10.	"Broadway Rhythm"	Darnell, Browder Jr.	2:48
11.	"Back In The Field Again"	Darnell, Browder Jr.	3:29
12.	"The Seven Year Itch"	Darnell, Browder Jr.	4:26

2002 Reissue Bonus tracks
No.	Title	Writer(s)	Length
13.	"Fireside Story (Fireside Chat)"	Hernandez	4:40
14.	"There's Something Wrong in Paradise" (12" Mix)	Darnell, Mazur	5:45
15.	"Don't Take My Coconuts"	Darnell	2:08

== Personnel ==
Performer credits

- Adriana Kaegi, Bongo Eddie, Carol Colman, Charles Lagond, Cheryl Poirier, Coati Mundi, Dave Span, Ken Fradley, Kid Creole, Lee Robertson, Mark Mazur, Peter Schott, Taryn Hagey – The Boys in the Band
- Andy Gonzalez, Buddy Williams, Charlie Story, Dave Friedman, Dian Sorel, Eddie Drennon, Eugene Grey, Francisco Centeno, Jerry Oland, Jill Jaffe & The Jaffettes, Jimmy Rippetoe, Joe Mannozzi, Jose Madera, Karen Joseph, Manny Oquendo, Mona Lagond, Phillipe Saisse, Felo Barito, Ron Barro, Steve Gerrios, Steve Kroon – extras
- Cory Daye, Dutch Robinson, Gichy Dan, Conjunto Libre, Lori Eastside, Perri Lister – special appearances
- Daryl Hall – special guest star ("Bongo Eddie's Lament")

Production credits

- August Darnell – producer
- Sugar Coated Andy Hernandez – associate producer
- Carol Colman – production coordinator
- Joe Barbaria, Michael H. Brauer, Julian McBrowne – chief engineer
- Andy Heermans, Gary Hillman, Michael Abbott, Richard McClain, Steve Rinkoff – assistant engineer
- Michael H. Brauer – mixing, Pond Life horns recording
- Greg Calbi – mastering
- Peter Ashworth – photography
- Bruno Tilley – art direction
- Tommy Mottola (Champion Entertainment Organization, Inc.) – management and direction
- John Rynsky – continuity
- Bora Bora Leoni – cordiality

== Charts ==
Chart (1983)	Peak position
German Albums (Offizielle Top 100)	54
Dutch Albums (Album Top 100)	46
New Zealand Albums (RMNZ)	44
Swedish Albums (Sverigetopplistan)	13
UK Albums (OCC)	21
