= You Shoulda Told Me You Were... =

Studio album by Kid Creole and the Coconuts
- Released: 1991
- Genre: Dance music
- Length: 43:07
- Label: Columbia
- Producer: August Darnell

Kid Creole and the Coconuts chronology
Private Waters in the Great Divide (1990)	You Shoulda Told Me You Were... (1991)	Kid Creole Redux (1993)

Singles from You Shoulda Told Me You Were...
- 1. "(She's A) Party Girl" b/w "Baby Doc" Released: 1991

You Shoulda Told Me You Were... is a studio album by the American musical group Kid Creole and the Coconuts, released in 1991. It includes the single "(She's A) Party Girl".

== Production ==
"Oh Marie" is about a woman shot during a drug-related drive-by. "Consequently" touches on the legacy of Christopher Columbus.

== Critical reception ==
Professional ratings
Review scores
Source	Rating
Calgary Herald	C
Robert Christgau	A−
The Rolling Stone Album Guide	2/5 stars

The Calgary Herald determined that "the love duet 'My Soul Intention' is like 'Wooly Bully' gone starry-eyed." The Sun Sentinel concluded that "Darnell has transformed himself from a sly, insightful lyricist to a sort of limp, Caribbean-flavored Prince."

The Globe and Mail wrote: "Wildly imaginative and cockily crafted, this is dance music for people who don't like dance music." The New York Times opined that "the temperament of American pop has narrowed, and it's hard to judge what room remains for the Kid Creole notion of a combined dance party and Broadway show."

The Morning Call included the album on its list of the 10 best of 1991, as did Geoffrey Himes of The Washington Post.

== Track listing ==
All tracks are written by August Darnell, except where indicated.

Side one
No.	Title	Writer(s)	Length
1.	"It's Automatic!"		4:17
2.	"Baby Doc"	Darnell, Danny Blume, Dougie Bowne	4:51
3.	"My Soul Intention"		3:36
4.	"Oh Marie"	Darnell, Peter Schott	4:54
5.	"Consequently"		4:19
6.	"Your Move!"		5:40
7.	"(She's A) Party Girl"		4:11
8.	"Something Incomplete"	Darnell, Schott	4:06
9.	"Madison Avenue"		3:11
10.	"How Can I Forget You? (The Benedektion)"		4:07
