= Tropical Gangsters =

Studio album by Kid Creole and the Coconuts
- Released: May 10, 1982
- Recorded: 1981–1982
- Studio: Blank Tapes, New York City; Electric Lady Studios, New York City
- Genre: Latin, funk, tropical
- Length: 40:29 (original album); 72:28 (with bonus tracks)
- Label: ZE Records/Island (UK & Europe); ZE Records/Sire Records (US & Canada)
- Producer: August Darnell

Kid Creole and the Coconuts chronology
Fresh Fruit in Foreign Places (1981)	Tropical Gangsters (1982)	Doppelganger (1983)

Alternative cover
- US & Canada album cover

Singles from Tropical Gangsters
- 1. "I'm a Wonderful Thing, Baby" Released: April 19, 1982; 2. "Stool Pigeon" Released: July 9, 1982; 3. "Annie, I'm Not Your Daddy" Released: September 24, 1982

Tropical Gangsters is the third album by Kid Creole and the Coconuts, released on May 10, 1982. Originally conceived as a solo album by band leader August Darnell and titled Wise Guy, his label ZE Records pressured him to change it to a Kid Creole and the Coconuts record and to make it more commercial sounding in order to relieve the label's financial problems. Despite the tensions this caused within the band and Darnell's complaint that the subsequent record was a "cop-out", the more dance-pop oriented sound helped it reached number 145 on the Billboard 200 album chart, representing the group's commercial breakthrough in their home country (the album kept the title of Wise Guy in the US and Canada, with a different cover). However, to the surprise of Darnell and his record company Tropical Gangsters was a huge success in Australia and New Zealand, Europe, and in particular the UK, where the album peaked at number three in the UK Albums Chart and yielded three top ten singles. Tropical Gangsters made Darnell a worldwide star, and the album remains both his and the ZE label's most successful record by far.

== Recording ==
Following promotional work for the second Kid Creole and the Coconuts album Fresh Fruit in Foreign Places, Darnell gave an interview to the UK music magazine Melody Maker in December 1981 in which he spoke enthusiastically of the forthcoming solo album he was planning called Wise Guy, and told the magazine about three songs he already had written for the record titled "I'm a Wonderful Thing", "Stool Pigeon" (originally titled "Jive Talking") and "Imitation". When it became apparent a few months later, however, that the record would no longer be a solo album and that it would be significantly different in style musically from the previous records, Darnell told interviewers at the time that it was "a chance to do some other things", but in reality he felt he was being forced to do "a cop-out album, an R&B album" in order to ease ZE's considerable financial difficulties with their parent label in the US, Sire Records. By the time of the album's release in May 1982, Darnell acknowledged that his record company had put pressure on him and that the record had not turned out how he had wanted: "Make no mistake about it, this album is a compromise. It's much more steeped in R&B than Kid Creole should be. That's why it originally was supposed to be an August Darnell solo album. But because of the problems we ran into in the [record] company, and the company not believing in Kid Creole enough, this had to be turned into a Kid Creole album."

The same article also interviewed Darnell's long-time friend and musical director in the Coconuts, Andy "Coati Mundi" Hernandez, where he expressed his own grievances and feelings of being left out of the recording process: "The Kid Creole album that's coming out, I wasn't originally involved in it. It was going to be an August Darnell solo album, and the powers that be decided to make it a Kid Creole album without taking my interest into consideration. That's when the trouble started for me." Hernandez was upset that after apparently being told he could contribute three songs to the album, in the end only one of his compositions ("I'm Corrupt") made it onto the final record, and even then in an almost lyric-free version because "they felt it wasn't in the concept of the album so they decided to put it on as an instrumental". He was also critical of the way Darnell had fired Hernandez's friend Lori Eastside from the band, after she had shared lead vocals with Darnell on the first two albums. The disagreements opened up a rift between Darnell and Hernandez which was never completely healed, and Hernandez eventually left the band a few years later.

The album was recorded over four weeks at Blank Tapes and Electric Lady Studios in New York City. Reflecting on the album in 2008, Darnell maintained that the album had been compromised but was philosophical about what its success had brought him:

I couldn't listen to that album for a long time because I thought it was a cop-out. It was a compromise but then you get massive success, money, lots of travelling and great lifestyle and you say: 'if this is what it takes...'

== Musical composition and themes ==
After reluctantly giving in to his record label's request to make the album a Kid Creole and the Coconuts record rather than a solo album, Darnell felt the most appropriate thing to do was to continue the concept of the first two Kid Creole albums, about the adventures of the band shipwrecked on the imaginary island of B'Dilli Bay. Darnell told NME about the album's theme, and also explained away the change of musical style from the first two albums, saying, "What this album is, is a continuation of the Fresh Fruit ... idea. Only it's a flashback, it all takes place on B'Dilli Bay ... It's a flashback story of what exactly happened for the 21 days that Creole and his crew stayed on that island, with the scum of the earth, the prostitutes, whores and pimps ... Creole is on B'Dilli Bay looking for Mimi and he had to spend time there, he had to buy his time there. Because the music of B'Dilli Bay was R&B. And Creole was forced to play the music to stay there."

"I'm a Wonderful Thing, Baby" was started by the Coconuts' keyboard player Peter Schott and originally titled "It's a Wonderful Thing". Darnell decided to change the first word to "I'm" and create a song about an egocentric character.

"Imitation" was Darnell's response to people who were constantly telling him about new British bands they felt were ripping off Kid Creole's music, and also a riposte to ZE label boss Michael Zilkha who had told him to write something less obviously Latin-sounding and "more funky": "As I explained to Zilkha later I'd been inspired by funk, just like I'd been inspired by salsa, but you don't find me writing pure cha-cha's or pure reggae because why should I do that? ... I'd rather take pride in knowing I've created a fusion of those worlds ... My motto has been 'Emulation not imitation is the healthy way to go'."

"Stool Pigeon" was inspired by a newspaper article Darnell had read about a former Mafia boss who had been let out of jail after providing information about his former colleagues, and had now had his identity changed and protected by the FBI. Darnell said, "I actually had compassion for the guy. I thought, wow, what a way to go. And I could understand why he did it. He sold out for the money and the comfort, I guess the very things that had brought him into the underworld." The song also features Darnell's attempt at the then newly fashionable art of rapping—he later confessed, "That's just me goofing at being a rapper, which was the last thing I ever wanted to do".

== Release and promotion ==
Three singles were taken from the album, "I'm a Wonderful Thing, Baby", "Stool Pigeon" and "Annie I'm Not Your Daddy". The band also undertook a tour of the UK and Europe which lasted several months, and consisted of a spectacular stage show that included dancers, black Japanese Al Mack, and a fire-eater named Eddie Magic. Coupled with the success of the singles the group's high-profile ensured that Tropical Gangsters sold consistently throughout Europe during the rest of 1982. "I'm a Wonderful Thing, Baby" also briefly hit the US dance charts.

The album was reissued in Europe on CD in 2002 with six bonus tracks of rare 12" versions and B-sides, notably "Double on Back" from the flipside of the "Stool Pigeon" 12" release.

== Critical reception ==
Professional ratings
Review scores
Source	Rating
AllMusic	3.5/5 stars
Q	4/5 stars
Spin Alternative Record Guide	9/10
The Village Voice	A

Reaction to the album at the time was mixed, with some former fans disappointed at the new commercial direction. In the UK, Gavin Martin of NME complained that "there's a feeling of going through the motions on many of the songs, playing out scenes and sending up manners and mores in an almost identikit fashion. Perhaps the most disappointing thing about this LP is the lack of vision and imagination in Darnell's songwriting ... Tropical Gangsters doesn't exactly stink, but there is a mighty stale whiff about it." However, in Melody Maker Paolo Hewitt was more positive, saying, "Gone is the musical exotica of Fresh Fruit ..., the last LP, to be replaced by a leaner, harder sound, characterised by an emphasis on percussion and rhythm guitar ... Far from being a collection of 'dull, insipid disco songs', as Sounds would have it, this album is packed with wit, humour, tunes and a clear sense of direction."

In The Guardian, Robin Denselow noted that there were fewer influences from Latin or Caribbean music than on the band's previous album Fresh Fruit in Foreign Places, and instead more emphasis on "straightforforward R&B and jangling funk". He stated, "A few tracks like the jangling, lumbering 'Stool Pigeon' do seem to have been included with the commercial disco market in mind but thankfully most tracks echo just a little of Darnell's gloriously eclectic taste and wit." He concluded, "It's an enjoyable album but it doesn't show what The Kid is capable of."

More recent reviews have been kinder to the album: Sharon Mawer of AllMusic said the songs on the album were "totally irresistible, danceable, easy to sing along to, and guaranteed to bring a smile to the face of pop dominated at the time by synthesizers and good-looking young men who looked more like girls".

=== Accolades ===
In the UK Tropical Gangsters was placed at number 12 in the NME critics' list of the best albums of 1982, and also included as one of Sounds' top twenty albums of the year. In 1989 Record Mirror placed the album at number 48 in their list of the 'Top 100 Albums of the Decade'. It was #26 on the 1982 Pazz & Jop Critics Poll.

== Track listing ==
All tracks are written by August Darnell, except where noted.

Side one
No.	Title	Writer(s)	Length
1.	"Annie, I'm Not Your Daddy"		6:16
2.	"I'm a Wonderful Thing, Baby"	music by Peter Schott, lyrics by August Darnell	5:15
3.	"Imitation"		4:11
4.	"I'm Corrupt"	Andy Hernandez	4:11

Side two
No.	Title	Length
5.	"Loving You Made a Fool Out of Me"	4:50
6.	"Stool Pigeon"	5:00
7.	"The Love We Have"	5:13
8.	"No Fish Today"	4:56

2002 reissue bonus tracks
No.	Title	Writer(s)	Length
9.	"Christmas on Riverside Drive" (from A Christmas Record)		4:20
10.	"You Had No Intention" (B-side of "Annie, I'm Not Your Daddy")		4:48
11.	"Annie, I'm Not Your Daddy" (Remix)		6:27
12.	"I'm a Wonderful Thing, Baby" (Original 12" Mix)	music by Peter Schott, lyrics by August Darnell	6:12
13.	"Stool Pigeon" (12" Mix)		6:22
14.	"Double on Back" (B-side of "Stool Pigeon" 12")		4:27

Notes

- The original UK vinyl release of Tropical Gangsters features a slower-pitched version of "Annie, I'm Not Your Daddy" running 6:27, whereas the original US vinyl release (as Wise Guy), and most CD releases feature a faster version running 6:16. The only CD edition featuring the slower version is the 2021 Rainman Records remaster of Wise Guy.
- The mid-80s Japanese CD reissue on Island Records replaces "Annie, I'm Not Your Daddy" and "Stool Pigeon" with their 12" mixes.

== Personnel ==
Kid Creole and the Coconuts:

- August Darnell, Coati Mundi, Peter Schott, Carol Coleman, Adriana Kaegi, Jimmy Rippetoe and special guest star Cory Daye

Additional personnel

- Angelica de la Luna, Ronnie Rogers, Dave Spann, Winston Grennan, Jay Stovall, Yogi Horton, Charles Lagond, Cheryl Poirier, Lori Eastside, Taryn Haegy, Perri Lister, Stephanie Fuller, Theodore "Dutch" Robinson, Christine Wiltshire, Mark Mazur, Clarence Banks, Andrew Lloyd, Floyd Fisher, Sam Turner and Eugene Grey

Additional credits

- Bob Blank – chief engineer
- Bruce Buchalter – assistant engineer
- Carlos Franzetti – horns and strings arrangements for the Pond Life Orchestra, except "I'm a Wonderful Thing, Baby"
- Michael Frondelli – chief engineer
- Michel Sauvage – assistant engineer
- Peter Schott – horns and strings arrangements on "I'm a Wonderful Thing, Baby"
- Michael Zilkha – executive producer

== Release history ==
Tropical Gangsters

Region	Date	Label	Format	Catalog
United Kingdom	May 10, 1982	ZE Records/Island	LP	ILPS 7016
United Kingdom	May 10, 1982	ZE Records/Island	cassette	ICT 7016
United Kingdom	1989	ZE Records/Island	CD	CID 7016
United Kingdom & Europe	July 29, 2002	Island/Universal	Remastered CD with bonus tracks	586 461–2

Wise Guy

Region	Date	Label	Format	Catalog
United States	1982	ZE Records/Sire Records	LP	SRK 3681
Canada	1982	ZE Records/Sire Records	LP	XSR 3681
United States	August 2, 2005	Wounded Bird Records	CD	WOU 3681

== Charts ==
=== Weekly charts ===
Chart (1982)	Peak position
Australia (Kent Music Report)	100
Dutch Albums (Album Top 100)	6
German Albums (Offizielle Top 100)	18
New Zealand Albums (RMNZ)	6
Norwegian Albums (VG-lista)	18
Swedish Albums (Sverigetopplistan)	22
UK Albums (OCC)	3
US Billboard 200	145

=== Year-end charts ===
Chart (1982)	Position
Dutch Albums (Album Top 100)	14
New Zealand Albums (RMNZ)	47
UK Albums (BMRB)	15

== Sales and certifications ==
Certifications for Tropical Gangsters
Region	Certification	Certified units/sales
Netherlands (NVPI)	Gold	50,000^{^}
United Kingdom (BPI)	Platinum	300,000^{^}
^{^} Shipments figures based on certification alone.
