= List of Miami Vice guest appearances =

The list of Miami Vice guest appearances is a list of actors/actresses to have appeared on the popular 1980s American television series, Miami Vice. The show included actors and actresses as well as musicians, celebrities, and athletes. Throughout the show's run most guest actors/actresses appeared once, while others appeared multiple times. At that time these actors and actresses were mostly unknown when they first guest appeared on the show, now they are some of the most widely known actors, actresses, and celebrities.

== Season 1 ==
No.	Episode	Guest	Character	Role
1	"Brother's Keeper"	Jimmy Smits	Eddie Rivera	Crockett's ill-fated partner
1	"Brother's Keeper"	Miguel Piñero	Calderone	Drug lord
1	"Brother's Keeper"	Mykelti Williamson	Leon Jefferson	Informant
1	"Brother's Keeper"	Martin Ferrero	Trini DeSoto	Middle man for Calderone
1	"Brother's Keeper"	Belinda Montgomery	Caroline Crockett	Crockett's estranged wife
1	"Brother's Keeper"	Bill Smitrovich	Scottie Wheeler	Internal Affairs/Dirty cop
2	"Heart of Darkness"	Ed O'Neill	Artie Lawson/ Artie Rollins	Undercover FBI agent
2	"Heart of Darkness"	Paul Hecht	Sam Kovics	-
2	"Heart of Darkness"	Suzy Amis	Penny McGraw	Hooker
3	"Cool Runnin'"	Larry Riley	Bobby Price	Undercover Vice cop
3	"Cool Runnin'"	Charlie Barnett	Noogie Lamont	Informant
4	"Calderone's Return: Part 1 - The Hit List"	Ron Taylor	Linus Oliver	Drug dealer who helps identify the person who hired the Argentinian
5	"Calderone's Return: Part 2 - Calderone's Demise"	Miguel Piñero	Calderone	Drug lord
5	"Calderone's Return: Part 2 - Calderone's Demise"	Sam McMurray	Jimmy "Jimbo" Walters	Bartender
6	"One Eyed Jack"	Dennis Farina	Albert Lombard	Mobster
6	"One Eyed Jack"	Joe Dallesandro	Vincent 'Vinnie' DeMarco	Middleman for Lombard who frames Crockett
6	"One Eyed Jack"	Dan Hedaya	Ben Schroeder	Internal Affairs Officer investigating Crockett
7	"No Exit"	Bruce Willis	Tony Amato	Arms smuggler
7	"No Exit"	Katherine Borowitz	Rita Amato	Amato's wife
7	"No Exit"	Coati Mundi	Ramone	Arms dealer working for Amato
8	"The Great McCarthy"	Martin Ferrero	Izzy Moreno	Bank robber turned informant
8	"The Great McCarthy"	Charles McCaughan	Dale Gifford	Accountant
9	"Glades"	Keith Szarabajka	Joey Bramlette	Witness
9	"Glades"	Margaret Whitton	Cassie Bramlette	Joey's wife
9	"Glades"	John Pankow	Clyde	Drug runner
10	"Give a Little, Take a Little"	Burt Young	Lupo Ramirez	Pimp
10	"Give a Little, Take a Little"	Michael Madsen	Sally Alvarado	Drug dealer
10	"Give a Little, Take a Little"	Terry O'Quinn	Richard Cain	Defense lawyer for Sally Alvarado
11	"Little Prince"	Giancarlo Esposito	Luther	Junkie
11	"Little Prince"	Mitchell Lichtenstein	Mark Jr.	Drug addicted teen who confronts his father's action
11	"Little Prince"	Maryann Plunkett	Mary McDermott	Colleague of Mark Sr. and family friend of Jorgensons
11	"Little Prince"	Paul Roebling	Mark Jorgenson	A wealthy industrialist
12	"Milk Run"	Eric Bogosian	Zeke	Friend of Angela
12	"Milk Run"	Evan Handler	Louis	Teen from New York attempting to purchase drugs for resale
12	"Milk Run"	Al Shannon	Eddie Rivers	Louis' partner and best friend
12	"Milk Run"	Rainbow Harvest	Angela	Informant
12	"Milk Run"	John Kapelos	Andy Sloan	Louis and Eddie's lawyer
12	"Milk Run"	Shawn Elliott	-	Pepe and Diego Moya's drug cooking cousin
13	"Golden Triangle: Part I"	Robin Johnson	Candy James	Prostitute turned informant
14	"Golden Triangle: Part II"	Joan Chen	May Ying	Castillo's thought to be dead wife
14	"Golden Triangle: Part II"	Keye Luke	Lao Li	Drug lord from the "Golden Triangle"
15	"Smuggler's Blues"	Glenn Frey	Jimmy Cole	Pilot for hire
15	"Smuggler's Blues"	Richard Jenkins	Ed Waters	DEA agent
15	"Smuggler's Blues"	Coati Mundi	Tucker Smith	Drugged out party host
15	"Smuggler's Blues"	Ron Vawter	Lt. Jones	Homicide investigator
15	"Smuggler's Blues"	Richard Edson	Wavey Davey	Cole's mechanic
16	"Rites of Passage"	Pam Grier	Valerie Gordon	NYPD Cop/former lover of Tubbs
16	"Rites of Passage"	John Turturro	David Traynor	Prostitution ring leader
16	"Rites of Passage"	David Thornton	Lile	Traynor's associate
16	"Rites of Passage"	Mario Ernesto Sánchez	Roberto	Cuban dipilomat
16	"Rites of Passage"	Nancy Valen	Unnamed	Hooker
17	"The Maze"	Garcelle Beauvais	Georges' sister	Haitian immigrant
17	"The Maze"	Jay O. Sanders	Tim Duryea	Detective
17	"The Maze"	Ving Rhames	Georges	Haitian immigrant
17	"The Maze"	Adolfo Quinones	Pepe	Former Escobar associate
17	"The Maze"	Joe Morton	Lt. Jack Davis	Hostage negotiator
18	"Made for Each Other"	Mark Linn-Baker	Barry Gold	Fast talking salesman
18	"Made for Each Other"	Ellen Greene	Darlene	Switek's girlfriend
18	"Made for Each Other"	Martin Ferrero	Izzy Moreno	Informant
18	"Made for Each Other"	Charlie Barnett	Noogie Lamont	Informant
18	"Made for Each Other"	Karla Tamburrelli	Ample Annie	Noogie's stripper fiancé
19	"The Home Invaders"	David Patrick Kelly	Jerry	Home invader
19	"The Home Invaders"	Esai Morales	Pete Romano	Home invader
19	"The Home Invaders"	Paul Calderón	Nicky	Home invader
19	"The Home Invaders"	Jack Kehoe	Lt. John Malone	Lt. in charge of Robbery Division
19	"The Home Invaders"	Brent Jennings	Sgt. Hugh Heraty	Sgt. in charge of Robbery Division
19	"The Home Invaders"	Sylvia Miles	Mrs. Abraham 'Murial' Goldman	Citizen who allows Crockett and Castillo to set up the home invaders
19	"The Home Invaders"	Nancy Valen	Lana	Hooker
20	"Nobody Lives Forever"	Kim Greist	Brenda	Crockett's girlfriend
20	"Nobody Lives Forever"	Peter Friedman	Morgan	Criminal rival of Lombard's
20	"Nobody Lives Forever"	Giancarlo Esposito	Ricky	Morgan's enforcer
20	"Nobody Lives Forever"	Martin Ferrero	Izzy Moreno	Informant
20	"Nobody Lives Forever"	Michael Carmine	Snake	Teen criminal
20	"Nobody Lives Forever"	Frank Military	Ace	Teen criminal
21	"Evan"	William Russ	Evan Freed	ATF agent
21	"Evan"	Al Israel	Guzman	Arms dealer
22	"Lombard"	Dennis Farina	Albert Lombard	Mobster
22	"Lombard"	Michael DeLorenzo	Salvatore "Sal" Lombard	Lombard's son
22	"Lombard"	Jon Bauman	Augie	Lombard's henchman

== Season 2 ==
No.	Episode	Guest	Character	Role
1	"Prodigal Son"	Gene Simmons	Newton Blade	Drug dealer
1	"Prodigal Son"	Penn Jillette	Jimmy Borges	Middleman for the New York City drug world
1	"Prodigal Son"	Julian Beck	J. J. Johnston	Wall Street banker funding drug dealers
1	"Prodigal Son"	Anthony Heald	René	NYPD commander
1	"Prodigal Son"	Pam Grier	Valerie Gordon	NYPD cop/former lover of Tubbs
1	"Prodigal Son"	James Russo	Frank Sacco	Drug mover
1	"Prodigal Son"	Bill Smitrovich	-	DEA Miami commander
1	"Prodigal Son"	Luis Guzmán	Miguel Revilla	Drug dealer
1	"Prodigal Son"	Miguel Piñero	Revilla	Drug dealer
1	"Prodigal Son"	Charles S. Dutton	Pearson	NYPD lieutenant
1	"Prodigal Son"	Susan Hess	Margaret	Art dealer/drug middleman
2	"Whatever Works"	Eartha Kitt	Chata	Santería priestess
2	"Whatever Works"	Martin Ferrero	Izzy Moreno	Informant
2	"Whatever Works"	Robert Trebor	Maxwell Dirks	Police administrator who seizes Crockett's Ferrari Daytona Spyder
2	"Whatever Works"	Power Station	Themselves	Performed in nightclub
3	"Out Where the Buses Don't Run"	Bruce McGill	Hank Wheldon	Ex-Vice Cop
3	"Out Where the Buses Don't Run"	Little Richard	Marvelle Quinn	Street preacher
3	"Out Where the Buses Don't Run"	David Strathairn	Marty Lang	Hank's ex-partner/Federal agent
4	"The Dutch Oven"	Giancarlo Esposito	Adonis	Drug dealer/friend of David
4	"The Dutch Oven"	Cleavant Derricks	David Jones	Trudy's ex-boyfriend
4	"The Dutch Oven"	David Johansen	-	Singer at boat party
5	"Buddies"	James Remar	Robert Cann	Crockett's friend
5	"Buddies"	Nathan Lane	Morty Price	Comedian
5	"Buddies"	Frankie Valli	Frank Doss	Mobster
5	"Buddies"	Tom Signorelli	Johnny Cannata	Mobster
5	"Buddies"	Eszter Balint	Dorothy Bain	Single mother on the run from mobsters
5	"Buddies"	Karla Tamburrelli	Ample Annie	Struggling stripper turned singer who befriends Dorothy
6	"Junk Love"	Miles Davis	Ivory Jones	Pimp
6	"Junk Love"	Ely Pouget	Rosella Maestres	Mobster girlfriend
7	"Tale of the Goat"	Clarence Williams III	Papa Legba	Haitian voodoo priest
7	"Tale of the Goat"	Mykelti Williamson	Sylvio Romulus	Haitian criminal
7	"Tale of the Goat"	Ray Sharkey	Bobby Profile	Car salesman/money launderer
8	"Bushido"	Dean Stockwell	Jack Gretsky	CIA agent
8	"Bushido"	Thomas G. Waites	Thompson	DEA agent
8	"Bushido"	Tom Bower	Carter	CIA agent
8	"Bushido"	Jerry Hardin	Hardin	CIA agent
8	"Bushido"	David Rasche	Surf	KGB agent
8	"Bushido"	Rosanna DeSoto	Erendira	Gretsky's wife
9	"Bought and Paid For"	Martin Ferrero	Izzy Moreno	Informant
9	"Bought and Paid For"	El Debarge	Himself	Singing in a club
9	"Bought and Paid For"	Lynn Whitfield	Odette	Rape victim
9	"Bought and Paid For"	Joaquim de Almeida	Roberto Arroyo	Odette's rape assailant
10	"Back in the World"	Bob Balaban	Ira Stone	Journalist investigating the heroin trade
10	"Back in the World"	G. Gordon Liddy	Col. William Maynard/ Capt. Real Estate	Politically motivated drug runner
10	"Back in the World"	Patti D'Arbanville	Mrs. Stone	Ira Stone's ex-wife
10	"Back in the World"	Iman	Dakotah	Drug middleman
11	"Phil the Shill"	Phil Collins	Phil Mayhew	Gameshow host/Con artist
11	"Phil the Shill"	Martin Ferrero	Izzy Moreno	Informant
11	"Phil the Shill"	Kyra Sedgwick	Sarah MacPhail	Phil Mayhew's accomplice
11	"Phil the Shill"	Emo Philips	-	Game show contestant
12	"Definitely Miami"	Ted Nugent	Charlie Basset	Drug dealer
12	"Definitely Miami"	Arielle Dombasle	Callie Basset	Basset's wife
12	"Definitely Miami"	Kamala Lopez	Maria Rojas	Sister of crime lord Sergio Clemente
12	"Definitely Miami"	Albert Hall	Joe Dalva	Head agent of Federal Organized Crime Task Force
13	"Yankee Dollar"	Ned Eisenberg	Charlie Glide	Businessman
13	"Yankee Dollar"	Austin Pendleton	Max Rogo	Associate for Charlie Glide
13	"Yankee Dollar"	Clayton Rohner	Timmy Davis	Errand boy
13	"Yankee Dollar"	Pepe Serna	Zabado	Drug smuggler/dealer
13	"Yankee Dollar"	Anne Carlisle	Lydia Sugarman	Desperate rich widow looking to make more money
14	"One Way Ticket"	Jan Hammer	Himself	Musician at a wedding
14	"One Way Ticket"	Lothaire Bluteau	Philippe Sagot	Assistant State Attorney killer
14	"One Way Ticket"	John Heard	Laurence Thurmond	Lawyer who defends Sagot
14	"One Way Ticket"	Annie Golden	Tommy	Mechanic/informant
15	"Little Miss Dangerous"	Julie Bovasso	-	Homeless lady
15	"Little Miss Dangerous"	Fiona	Jackie McSeidan	Troubled girl
15	"Little Miss Dangerous"	Larry Joshua	Cat	Jackie's boyfriend
16	"Florence Italy"	Danny Sullivan	Danny Tepper	Race car driver who is accused of murdering a hooker
16	"Florence Italy"	Stephen Joyce	Frank Tepper	Danny's father and fellow race car driver
16	"Florence Italy"	The Fat Boys	Themselves	Rapping at a street corner
16	"Florence Italy"	Charles Rocket	Marty Worthington	Racing sponsor
16	"Florence Italy"	Annie Golden	Tommy	Mechanic/informant
17	"French Twist"	Leonard Cohen	Francois Zolan	Interpol agent
17	"French Twist"	Lisa Eichhorn	Danielle Hier	Interpol agent/terrorist
17	"French Twist"	Shari Headley	Cindy	Teenage girl who witnesses murder
18	"The Fix"	Bill Russell	Judge Ferguson	A dishonest judge with a gambling debt
18	"The Fix"	Bernard King	Matt Ferguson	Son of Judge Ferguson and FIU Sunblazers (now the Golden Panthers) basketball player
18	"The Fix"	Harvey Fierstein	Benedict	Crooked attorney
18	"The Fix"	Michael Richards	Pagone	Racketeer
19	"Payback"	Dan Hedaya	Reuben Reydolfo	Middleman for Fuentes
19	"Payback"	Roberto Durán	Jesus Maroto	Convict
19	"Payback"	Frank Zappa	Mario Fuentes	Drug kingpin
19	"Payback"	Graham Beckel	Agent Kevin Cates/ Lou Carlin	DEA agent who tries to frame Crockett
20	"Free Verse"	Byrne Piven	Hector Sandoval	A radical poet seeking political asylum
20	"Free Verse"	Bianca Jagger	Carmen/La Muerta	Assassin
20	"Free Verse"	Suicidal Tendencies	Themselves	Performed in nightclub
20	"Free Verse"	Luis Guzmán	-	Goon
20	"Free Verse"	Michael Bay	-	Goon
21	"Trust Fund Pirates"	Tommy Chong	T.R. 'Jumbo' Collins	Drug dealer
21	"Trust Fund Pirates"	Charlie Barnett	Noogie Lamont	Informant
21	"Trust Fund Pirates"	Gary Cole	Jackson Crane	Drug smuggler
21	"Trust Fund Pirates"	Perry Lang	Skip Mueller	Trust fund kid wanting some exotic fun in his life
21	"Trust Fund Pirates"	Richard Belzer	Captain Hook	Radio DJ
21	"Trust Fund Pirates"	Denny Dillon	Fluffy Collins	Jumbo's wife
21	"Trust Fund Pirates"	Nicole Fosse	Lani Mueller	Sister of Skip who sets up Crane
22	"Sons and Lovers"	John Leguizamo	Orlando Calderone	Calderone's son who seeks revenge for his father's death
22	"Sons and Lovers"	Lee Iacocca	Lido	Parks commissioner

== Season 3 ==
No.	Episode	Guest	Character	Role
1	"When Irish Eyes Are Crying"	Liam Neeson	Sean Carroon	Irish terrorist
1	"When Irish Eyes Are Crying"	Martin Ferrero	Izzy Moreno	Informant
1	"When Irish Eyes Are Crying"	Paul Gleason	Bunny Berrigan	Carroon's associate
1	"When Irish Eyes Are Crying"	Daniel Gerroll	Richard Cross	Scotland Yard Officer trying to kill Carroon
1	"When Irish Eyes Are Crying"	Walter Gotell	Max Klizer	Arms smuggler
1	"When Irish Eyes Are Crying"	Jeff Fahey	Eddie Kaye	Arms dealer
2	"Stone's War"	Bob Balaban	Ira Stone	Journalist
2	"Stone's War"	G. Gordon Liddy	Col. William Maynard/ Capt. Real Estate	Politically motivated drug runner
2	"Stone's War"	Lonette McKee	Alicia Mena	Journalist
2	"Stone's War"	Raymond Forchion	O'Hara	Soldier in Maynard's paramilitary
3	"Kill Shot"	Carlos Cestero	Frank Arriolla	Customs agent
3	"Kill Shot"	Angela Alvarado	Jan Larken	Hooker
3	"Kill Shot"	Fernando Allende	Tico Arriola	Jai Alai player and Frank's brother
4	"Walk-Alone"	Martin Ferrero	Izzy Moreno	Informant
4	"Walk-Alone"	Kevin Conway	Commander Fox	Commander of Bulton Prison
4	"Walk-Alone"	Laurence Fishburne	Keller	Prison guard
4	"Walk-Alone"	Ron Perlman	John Ruger	Director of prisons
4	"Walk-Alone"	John Corker	Samson	Muslim Brotherhood leader
4	"Walk-Alone"	A. J. Duhe	Hammer	Convict
4	"Walk-Alone"	Jim Kiick	-	Convict
5	"The Good Collar"	Charles S. Dutton	Ed McCain	Ellis' mentor
5	"The Good Collar"	Nick Corri	Ramirez	Undercover detective of youth gang unit
5	"The Good Collar"	John Spencer	Lt. Lee Atkins	Ramirez's boss
5	"The Good Collar"	Vincent Keith Ford	Archie Ellis	A youth Crockett busts for drugs
5	"The Good Collar"	Terry Kinney	William Pepin	Assistant state attorney
6	"Shadow in the Dark"	Ed Lauter	Cahill	Police captain
6	"Shadow in the Dark"	Jack Thibeau	Ray Gilmore	Burglary lieutenant
6	"Shadow in the Dark"	Timothy Carhart	George Wyatt	Retired cat burglar
6	"Shadow in the Dark"	Vincent Caristi	The Shadow	Cat burglar
7	"El Viejo"	Willie Nelson	Jake Pierson	Texas Ranger
7	"El Viejo"	Steve Buscemi	Rickles	Middleman
8	"Better Living Through Chemistry"	Martin Ferrero	Izzy Moreno	Informant
8	"Better Living Through Chemistry"	Victor Love	Clarence Batisse	Club DJ/Tubbs' former NYPD partner
8	"Better Living Through Chemistry"	Rob Nilsson	Wango Mack	Drug dealer/Batisse's boss
9	"Baby Blues"	Stanley Tucci	Steve Demarco	Parent who adopted a smuggled baby
9	"Baby Blues"	Patrice Martinez	Maria Escobar	Colombian woman looking for her kidnapped baby
10	"Streetwise"	Bill Paxton	Vic Romano	Undercover cop in love with Carla
10	"Streetwise"	Wesley Snipes	Silk	Drug dealer/pimp
10	"Streetwise"	Tom Mardirosian	Leo	Mobster
10	"Streetwise"	Alice Adair	Carla Cappoletti	Hooker
10	"Streetwise"	Marc Macaulay	-	Hit driver
11	"Forgive us Our Debts"	Guy Boyd	Frank Hackman	Death row inmate, who is able to convince Crockett he's innocent
11	"Forgive us Our Debts"	D. W. Moffett	Thomas Waldman	District attorney running for reelection
11	"Forgive us Our Debts"	Bill Raymond	Tommy Berkeley	Supposedly dead criminal
11	"Forgive us Our Debts"	Olga Karlatos	Felicia Diaz	Albierro's ex-wife
12	"Down for the Count Pt. 1"	Mark Breland	Bobby Sykes	Boxer
12	"Down for the Count Pt. 1"	Don King	Don Cash	Boxing promoter
12	"Down for the Count Pt. 1"	Pepe Serna	Oswaldo Guzman	Drug smuggler/bookie
12	"Down for the Count Pt. 1"	Randall "Tex" Cobb	Moon	Bobby Sykes boxing manager
13	"Down for the Count Pt. 2"	Mark Breland	Bobby Sykes	Boxer
13	"Down for the Count Pt. 2"	Pepe Serna	Oswaldo Guzman	Drug smuggler/bookie
13	"Down for the Count Pt. 2"	Robert Pastorelli	Vespa	Giulinni's Miami manager
13	"Down for the Count Pt. 2"	Joe Dallesandro	Alfredo Giulinni	Las Vegas Mobster
13	"Down for the Count Pt. 2"	Robert Moresco	Frank	Driver
13	"Down for the Count Pt. 2"	Chris Elliott	Danny Allred	The Cryptographer
14	"Cuba Libre"	Beeson Carroll	Jack Slade	FBI Agent/Gamma 37 member
14	"Cuba Libre"	Willie Colón	Armando Rojas	Drug dealer
14	"Cuba Libre"	Ismael 'East' Carlo	Victor Vasquez	Gamma 37 member trying to save his family
15	"Duty and Honor (aka The Savage)"	Haing S. Ngor	Inspector Nguyn Van Trahn	Saigon Police Officer/Castillo's friend
15	"Duty and Honor (aka The Savage)"	Judith Malina	Unnamed	Sunrise Hotel clerk
15	"Duty and Honor (aka The Savage)"	Gary Basaraba	Dr. Morris	VA psychiatric doctor
15	"Duty and Honor (aka The Savage)"	Michael Wright	The Savage	Hooker serial killer
15	"Duty and Honor (aka The Savage)"	Brad Sullivan	Jack Colman	Federal agent/The Savage's boss
15	"Duty and Honor (aka The Savage)"	Helena Bonham Carter	Dr. Theresa Lyons	Crockett's girlfriend
16	"Theresa"	Helena Bonham Carter	Dr. Theresa Lyons	Crockett's girlfriend/junkie
16	"Theresa"	Zach Grenier	-	Internal affairs officer
16	"Theresa"	Richard Chaves	Martinez	District attorney
16	"Theresa"	Calvin Levels	Rudy Ramos	Drug dealer
16	"Theresa"	Tim Cappello	Arzola	Goon
16	"Theresa"	Brad Dourif	Joey Wyatt	Drug dealer
17	"The Afternoon Plane"	John Leguizamo	Orlando Calderone	-
17	"The Afternoon Plane"	Vincent D'Onofrio	Leon Wolf	Ex-convict helping Calderone
17	"The Afternoon Plane"	Margaret Avery	Sally Cordoba	Ex-girlfriend of Tubbs
18	"Lend Me An Ear"	Martin Ferrero	Izzy Moreno	Informant
18	"Lend Me An Ear"	John Glover	Steve Duddy	Ex-Miami cop/surveillance operator
19	"Red Tape"	Viggo Mortensen	Eddie Trumbull	Diaz's partner
19	"Red Tape"	Annette Bening	Vicky	McIntyre's accomplice
19	"Red Tape"	Lou Diamond Phillips	Bobby Diaz	South Dade Junior Det. whose partner is killed and thinks Tubbs is dirty
19	"Red Tape"	Scott Plank	Glen McIntyre	Dirty Miami cop
20	"By Hooker By Crook"	Melanie Griffith	Christine Von Marburg	Businesswoman/Madam
20	"By Hooker By Crook"	George Takei	Kenneth Togaru	Money launderer
20	"By Hooker By Crook"	Martin Ferrero	Izzy Moreno	Informant
20	"By Hooker By Crook"	Lou Albano	Unnamed	Henchmen
20	"By Hooker By Crook"	Vanity	Ali Ferrand	Call girl
20	"By Hooker By Crook"	Veronica Cartwright	-	Society dame
20	"By Hooker By Crook"	Afa Anoaʻi	Unnamed	Henchmen
20	"By Hooker By Crook"	Bill Boggs	-	TV host
21	"Knock Knock...Who's There?"	Ian McShane	Esteban Montoya	Drug dealer
21	"Knock Knock...Who's There?"	Elizabeth Ashley	Linda Colby	Dirty DEA agent
21	"Knock Knock...Who's There?"	Samm-Art Williams	Lead DEA Agent	Colby's boss
21	"Knock Knock...Who's There?"	Martin Ferrero	Izzy Moreno	Informant
22	"Viking Bikers From Hell"	Martin Ferrero	Izzy Moreno	Informant
22	"Viking Bikers From Hell"	Reb Brown	Reb Gustafson	Biker avenging his buddy's death
22	"Viking Bikers From Hell"	John Matuszak	Lascoe	Biker
22	"Viking Bikers From Hell"	Kim Coates	Jack Cragun	Leader of Violators
22	"Viking Bikers From Hell"	Sonny Landham	Toad	Biker
23	"Everybody's in Showbiz"	Michael Carmine	Mikey	Actor/recovering drug acddict
23	"Everybody's in Showbiz"	Benicio del Toro	Pito	Mikey's brother
23	"Everybody's in Showbiz"	Paul Calderón	Don Gallego	Drug dealer
23	"Everybody's in Showbiz"	Coati Mundi	Conejo	Mikey's friend
23	"Everybody's in Showbiz"	Charles Keating	Marty Glickberg	-
23	"Everybody's in Showbiz"	Mario Ernesto Sánchez	Paco	Limo driver for Gallego
24	"Heroes of the Revolution"	Jeroen Krabbé	Klaus Herzog	East German assassin
24	"Heroes of the Revolution"	Shawn Elliott	Orrestes Pedrosa	Cuban Revolutionary Army officer
24	"Heroes of the Revolution"	George Dickerson	Chet Blakemore	FBI agent

== Season 4 ==
No.	Episode	Guest	Character	Role
1	"Contempt of Court"	Stanley Tucci	Frank Mosca	Mobster
1	"Contempt of Court"	Philip Baker Hall	Delaporte	Federal judge
1	"Contempt of Court"	Meg Foster	Alice Carson	Prosecutor
1	"Contempt of Court"	Steven Keats	Jack Rivers	Informant
2	"Amen...Send Money"	Brian Dennehy	Reverend Billy Bob Proverb	Preacher who tries to frame Tubbs
2	"Amen...Send Money"	Ben Stiller	Fast Eddie Felcher	Scam artist
2	"Amen...Send Money"	James Tolkan	Mason Mather	Preacher who tries to frame Billy Bob Proverb
2	"Amen...Send Money"	Jo Anderson	Faye Nell	Daughter of the church who accuses Tubbs of raping her
2	"Amen...Send Money"	Anita Morris	Leona Proverb	Caught buying drugs by Tubbs
3	"Death and the Lady"	Paul Guilfoyle	Milton Glantz	Film director
3	"Death and the Lady"	Kelly Lynch	Lori 'Blondie' Swann	Adult film actress
3	"Death and the Lady"	Miguel Ferrer	-	District attorney
3	"Death and the Lady"	Penelope Ann Miller	Jill Ryder	Sister of Amy Rider
3	"Death and the Lady"	Marc Macaulay	Brookings	Adult film store owner
3	"Death and the Lady"	Mark McCracken	Asch	-
4	"The Big Thaw"	Alfred Molina	-	Esther's attorney
4	"The Big Thaw"	Martin Ferrero	Izzy Moreno	Informant
4	"The Big Thaw"	Bill Raymond	Dave Frobel	Scientist
5	"Child's Play"	Ving Rhames	Walker Monroe	Abusive boyfriend/small-time arms dealer
5	"Child's Play"	Belinda Montgomery	Caroline Ballard	Crockett's ex-wife
5	"Child's Play"	Isaac Hayes	Holiday	Small-time arms dealer
5	"Child's Play"	Danitra Vance	Annette McAllister	Monroe's girlfriend
6	"God's Work"	Esai Morales	Felipe Cruz	Son of Jorge Cruz/lawyer
6	"God's Work"	Alfonso Arau	Jorge Cruz	Mobster
6	"God's Work"	Rosanna DeSoto	Maria Lupe Cruz	Jorge Cruz's wife
6	"God's Work"	Jonathan Del Arco	Ricky Diaz	Teenage punk
6	"God's Work"	Francesco Quinn	Francesco Cruz	Felipe's brother
6	"God's Work"	Olek Krupa	Vater Wajda	Priest
7	"Missing Hours"	James Brown	Lou De Long	Forum spokesperson on alien contact
7	"Missing Hours"	Martin Ferrero	Izzy Moreno	Informant
7	"Missing Hours"	Charlie Barnett	Noogie Lamont	Informant
7	"Missing Hours"	Chris Rock	Carson	Central filing clerk
8	"Like a Hurricane"	Xander Berkeley	Tommy Lowell	Record producer
8	"Like a Hurricane"	Teller	Ralph Fisher	Defense lawyer
8	"Like a Hurricane"	Jan Hammer	Himself	Musician at a wedding
8	"Like a Hurricane"	Tony Hendra	Gordon Wiggins	Music executive
8	"Like a Hurricane"	Toukie Smith	Angie	Caitlin's assistant/friend
8	"Like a Hurricane"	Sheena Easton	Caitlin Davies	Singer/Crockett's wife
9	"The Rising Sun of Death"	Cary-Hiroyuki Tagawa	Kenji Fujitsu	Former Tokyo police officer
9	"The Rising Sun of Death"	R. Lee Ermey	Sgt. Ernest Haskell	Metro-Dade Police detective
9	"The Rising Sun of Death"	James Hong	Riochi Tanaka	Japanese businessman
9	"The Rising Sun of Death"	Danny Kamekona	Agawa	Tanaka's henchman
9	"The Rising Sun of Death"	Sheena Easton	Caitlin Davies	Singer/Crockett's wife
10	"Love at First Sight"	Iman	Lois Blyth	Serial killer
10	"Love at First Sight"	Annabelle Gurwitch	Teri	Hooker
10	"Love at First Sight"	Lori Petty	Carol	Video dating service customer
10	"Love at First Sight"	Toukie Smith	Angie	Caitlin's assistant/friend
10	"Love at First Sight"	Sheena Easton	Caitlin Davies	Singer/Crockett's wife
11	"Rock and a Hard Place"	Sheena Easton	Caitlin Davies	Singer/Crockett's wife
11	"Rock and a Hard Place"	Tony Hendra	Gordon Wiggins	Music executive
11	"Rock and a Hard Place"	Toukie Smith	Angie	Caitlin's assistant/friend
11	"Rock and a Hard Place"	Jack Kenny	Jerry Lee	Tabloid reporter
12	"The Cows of October"	Martin Ferrero	Izzy Moreno	Informant
12	"The Cows of October"	Harry Shearer	Timothy Anderson	Federal agent
12	"The Cows of October"	Gerrit Graham	Calvin Teal	Cow breeder
13	"Vote of Confidence"	Larry Pine	Tom Pierce	Politician running for Governor who is caught in a scandal
13	"Vote of Confidence"	Barry Lynch	Barry Bloom	Political operative who sets up Tom Pierce
13	"Vote of Confidence"	Jonathan Hadary	Hank Frazier	Journalist who tries to blackmail Tom Pierce and his rival
13	"Vote of Confidence"	Lucinda Jenney	Annie Pierce	Wife of Tom Pierce
13	"Vote of Confidence"	Michael Stark	Wayne Hazlitt	Tom Pierce's campaign manager
14	"Baseballs of Death"	Michael Des Barres	Shane Dubois	Cinder's pimp
14	"Baseballs of Death"	Lisa Marie	Cinder	Hooker
14	"Baseballs of Death"	Mark Metcalf	Brody	Miami DEA agent conspiring with Guerrero
14	"Baseballs of Death"	Tony Plana	Ernesto Guerrero	Chilean Police General who's looking to buy some illegal arms
14	"Baseballs of Death"	Oliver Platt	Speed Stiles	Illegal arms dealer
15	"Indian Wars"	Joe Turkel	Levec	Drug lord
15	"Indian Wars"	Joe Lala	Anthony Acosta	Middleman for Levec
16	"Honor Among Thieves?"	Ramy Zada	Palmo	Drug lord
16	"Honor Among Thieves?"	Gary Basaraba	Cyrus	Palmo's bodyguard
16	"Honor Among Thieves?"	Dylan Baker	Lt. Edward Jarell	Metro-Dade homicide officer
17	"Hell Hath No Fury"	Don Harvey	Alan Beaks	Rapist
17	"Hell Hath No Fury"	John Finn	Charles Hatch	Hitman
17	"Hell Hath No Fury"	John Michael Higgins	Murray Phillips	TV reporter
18	"Badge of Dishonor"	Nick Corri	Colon	Dirty cop
18	"Badge of Dishonor"	Reni Santoni	Arturo Dominguez	South Beach police lieutenant
18	"Badge of Dishonor"	Julio Oscar Mechoso	Escobar	Drug dealer
18	"Badge of Dishonor"	Barbra Streisand	-	Pedestrian
19	"Blood & Roses"	Stanley Tucci	Frank Mosca	Mobster
19	"Blood & Roses"	Michael Wincott	Wilson Cook	Money launderer
19	"Blood & Roses"	Meg Foster	Alice Carson	District attorney
19	"Blood & Roses"	Paul Herman	Jimmy Roth	Mobster
19	"Blood & Roses"	Frank Stallone	Billy	Mosca's dirty man
19	"Blood & Roses"	Gabriel Traversari	Vincent	-
19	"Blood & Roses"	Mark McCracken	-	Federal agent
20	"A Bullet for Crockett"	Jesse Borrego	Enrique Morca-Mendez	Drug dealer
20	"A Bullet for Crockett"	Lisa Vidal	Angel Montepina	Morca-Mendez's girlfriend who shot Crockett
20	"A Bullet for Crockett"	Martin Ferrero	Izzy Moreno	Informant
21	"Deliver Us From Evil"			
21	"Deliver Us From Evil"	Sheena Easton	Caitlin Daives	Singer/Crockett's wife
21	"Deliver Us From Evil"	Guy Boyd	Frank Hackman	Crockett's nemesis/killer
21	"Deliver Us From Evil"	Don Keith Opper	Johnny Blatt	Conspired with Hackman
22	"Mirror Image"	Julia Roberts	Polly Wheeler	Drug dealer's girlfriend
22	"Mirror Image"	Chris Cooper	Jimmy Hagovitch	Dirty Fort Lauderdale detective
22	"Mirror Image"	Antonio Fargas	Alejandro Gutierrez	Drug dealer
22	"Mirror Image"	Tony Azito	Manolo	Drug lord
22	"Mirror Image"	Brent Jennings	Rolando Jordan	Fort Lauderdale detective sergeant

== Season 5 ==
No.	Episode	Guest	Character	Role
1	"Hostile Takeover"	Joe Santos	Oscar Carrera	Drug lord
1	"Hostile Takeover"	Jon Polito	El Gato	Drug lord
1	"Hostile Takeover"	Anthony Crivello	Miguel Carrera	Oscar's son
1	"Hostile Takeover"	Matt Frewer	Cliff King	Middleman
1	"Hostile Takeover"	Debra Feuer	Celeste	Oscar's wife
1	"Hostile Takeover"	Victor Argo	Commandante Salazar	Peruvian general smuggling drugs
2	"Redemption in Blood"	Jon Polito	El Gato	Drug lord
2	"Redemption in Blood"	Matt Frewer	Cliff King	Middleman
2	"Redemption in Blood"	Debra Feuer	Celeste	Oscar's wife
2	"Redemption in Blood"	Victor Argo	Commandante Salazar	Peruvian General smuggling drugs
3	"Heart of Night"	Rosalind Chao	Mai Ying	Castillo's ex-wife
3	"Heart of Night"	James Saito	Ma Sek	Mai Ying's husband
3	"Heart of Night"	Bob Gunton	Rivas	Ma Sek's boss who is attempting to repossess smuggled bearer bonds
4	"Bad Timing"	Melissa Leo	Kathleen Gilfords	Bartender
4	"Bad Timing"	William O'Leary	Scott "Scotty" McKenna	Friend of Cruz and Wilson
4	"Bad Timing"	Pruitt Taylor Vince	Cruz	Prison escapee
4	"Bad Timing"	Gary Farmer	Wilson	Prison escapee
4	"Bad Timing"	Marc Macaulay	Doc Jerry	Associate of Wilson and Cruz
4	"Bad Timing"	Stephanie Roth	Dr. Samantha Phillips	Crockett's psychiatrist
4	"Bad Timing"	Jermaine Stewart	The Singer	Singer at prison
5	"Borrasca"	Juan Fernández	El Martillo Borrasca	Drug lord
5	"Borrasca"	Brion James	Edward Reese	Freelance intelligence agent
5	"Borrasca"	Carlos Cestero	Arturo Uribe	Retired detective
5	"Borrasca"	Mario Ernesto Sánchez	Jorge	Uribe's friend
6	"Line of Fire"	Kevyn Major Howard	Bates	FBI agent
6	"Line of Fire"	Barry Primus	Daley	FBI agent
6	"Line of Fire"	Aasif Mandvi	-	Doorman
6	"Line of Fire"	Justin Lazard	Keith	Witness
7	"Asian Cut"	Cary-Hiroyuki Tagawa	Tegoro	Reformed drug dealer
7	"Asian Cut"	David Schramm	Stuart Whitney	Psychotic killer of hookers
7	"Asian Cut"	Steve Ryan	Eric Halliwell	Father of a runaway girl
7	"Asian Cut"	Russell Horton	Stuart Orr Whitley	Freelance photojournalist
7	"Asian Cut"	Spider Martin	Otis	Drunk homeless man
7	"Asian Cut"	Steve Gladstone	-	Motel owner
8	"Hard Knocks"	Richard Jenkins	Goodman	Bookie
8	"Hard Knocks"	Victor Slezak	Jerome Horowitz	Sports agent
8	"Hard Knocks"	Jordan Clarke	Mac Mulhern	Switek's friend
8	"Hard Knocks"	Ismael 'East' Carlo	Chi Chi	Bookie
9	"Fruit of the Poison Tree"	Stephen McHattie	Sam Boyle	Defense lawyer
9	"Fruit of the Poison Tree"	Jeffrey Meek	Enriquez	Drug dealer
9	"Fruit of the Poison Tree"	Tony Sirico	Frank Romano	Mobster
9	"Fruit of the Poison Tree"	Amanda Plummer	Lisa Madsen	Defense lawyer
10	"To Have and to Hold"	Belinda Montgomery	Caroline Ballard	Crockett's ex-wife
10	"To Have and to Hold"	Elpidia Carrillo	Maria Pendroza	Louis Pendroza's wife who sets up the Pendroza family
10	"To Have and to Hold"	Miguel Ferrer	Ramon Pendroza	Son of Louis Pendroza/drug dealer
10	"To Have and to Hold"	Rafael Ferrer	Carlos Jr.	Ramon's cousin
11	"Miami Squeeze"	Robert Joy	Sebastian Ross	Drug smuggler
11	"Miami Squeeze"	Rita Moreno	Madelyn Woods	Florida Congresswoman
11	"Miami Squeeze"	Peter Nelson	Dan Shaw	Madelyn's campaign manager
11	"Miami Squeeze"	Paul Provenza	Ricky DeMarina	Drug dealer
11	"Miami Squeeze"	Sherrie Rose	Jenny	-
11	"Miami Squeeze"	Mario Ernesto Sánchez	Morales	Middleman
11	"Miami Squeeze"	Justin Lazard	Joey Chandler	Undercover police officer
11	"Miami Squeeze"	Conrad Roberts	Henry Williford	Metro-Dade police commissioner
12	"Jack of All Trades"	David Andrews	Jack Crockett	Crockett's cousin who gets into some deep trouble
12	"Jack of All Trades"	Jesse Borrego	Octavio Escandero	Drug lord
12	"Jack of All Trades"	Robert Miranda	Ray Soliz	Escandero's associate
13	"The Cell Within"	John P. Ryan	Jake Manning	Reformed murderer
13	"The Cell Within"	Robin Bartlett	Rhoda King	Manning's prison psychiatrist
13	"The Cell Within"	Maria Pitillo	Anna	Hooker
13	"The Cell Within"	Mark McCracken	Mason	Drug dealer
13	"The Cell Within"	Richard Gant	Battlin' Barry Gay	Manning's assistant
14	"The Lost Madonna"	Michael Chiklis	Det. Jeffrey Whitehead	NYPD cop on the trail of missing artwork
14	"The Lost Madonna"	Ned Eisenberg	Sal Castelli	Joey's cousin
14	"The Lost Madonna"	Peter Dobson	Joey Scianti	Attempting to sell along with Sal a sculpture of Madonna and Child
14	"The Lost Madonna"	Elizabeth Berridge	Julia Scianti	Joey's sister who runs an art gallery
15	"Over the Line"	Martin Ferrero	Izzy Moreno	Informant
15	"Over the Line"	Anthony Barrile	Johnny	Vigilante police officer
15	"Over the Line"	Tomas Arana	Walter Stevens	Head of vigilante cop task force
15	"Over the Line"	Robert Fields	Richard Highsmith	Metro-Dade police captain
15	"Over the Line"	Kevin Corrigan	Jamison	-
16	"Victims of Circumstance"	Paul Guilfoyle	John Baker	Leader of the Neo-nazi group the "Patriotic Brigade"
16	"Victims of Circumstance"	John Leguizamo	Angelo Alvarez	Drug dealer
16	"Victims of Circumstance"	Xander Berkeley	Bailey	Metro-Dade detective
16	"Victims of Circumstance"	Karen Black	Helen Jackson	Reporter and daughter of Kozak
16	"Victims of Circumstance"	William Hickey	Hans Kozak	Nazi death camp leader
16	"Victims of Circumstance"	Stefan Gierasch	Dr. Leo Krebs	Seeking the extradition of Kozak
17	"Freefall"	Ian McShane	General Manuel Borbon	Costa Morado Dictator who is brought to the United States by Crockett and Tubbs
17	"Freefall"	Greg Germann	Johnny Raymond	Drug dealer who plays both sides
17	"Freefall"	Sherman Howard	Col. Andrew Baker	US Government Special Drug Enforcement Task Force Commander who recruits Crockett and Tubbs
17	"Freefall"	Martin Ferrero	Izzy Moreno	Informant
17	"Freefall"	Anna Katarina	-	Borbon's fiancée
17	"Freefall"	Elpidia Carrillo	Sister Felicia	Rebel who assists Crockett and Tubbs to get Borbon out
17	"Freefall"	Robert Beltran	Capt. Jimendez	Borbon's top assistant
17	"Freefall"	Robert Fields	Richard Highsmith	Metro-Dade police chief
18	"World of Trouble"	Dennis Farina	Albert Lombard	Mobster
18	"World of Trouble"	Ned Eisenberg	Lubrizzi	Mobster
18	"World of Trouble"	Marc Macaulay	Johnny Cottman	Goon
18	"World of Trouble"	Vincent Schiavelli	Lawrence Fowler	Scientist who designs device that stops vehicles without destroying them
18	"World of Trouble"	Tim Quill	Salvatore "Sal" Lombard	Lombard's son
19	"Miracle Man"	Zach Grenier	Eric Terry	Reporter
19	"Miracle Man"	John Castellanos	Carlos Perena	Drug lord
19	"Miracle Man"	Martin Ferrero	Izzy Moreno	Informant
19	"Miracle Man"	Conrad Roberts	Henry Williford	Metro-Dade police commissioner
20	"Leap of Faith"	Kiel Martin	Paul Cutter	Metro-Dade detective running his own undercover unit
20	"Leap of Faith"	Cameron Dye	Jack Andrews	Undercover cop
20	"Leap of Faith"	Laura San Giacomo	Tania Louis	Cutter's researcher/cop
20	"Leap of Faith"	Jennifer Rubin	Claire	Student of Professor Baines
20	"Leap of Faith"	Adam Storke	Ray Mundy	Undercover cop
20	"Leap of Faith"	Keith Gordon	Terrence "Terry" Baines	College professor who is creating a new designer drug
20	"Leap of Faith"	Justin Lazard	Joey Chandler/Harden	Undercover cop
21	"Too Much, Too Late"	Pam Grier	Valerie Gordon	NYPD cop/former lover of Tubbs
21	"Too Much, Too Late"	Martin Ferrero	Izzy Moreno	Informant
21	"Too Much, Too Late"	Malinda Williams	Lynette	Yvonne's daughter
21	"Too Much, Too Late"	CCH Pounder	Yvonne	Drug addicted mother
21	"Too Much, Too Late"	June Gable	Dr. Ellen Hardy	Attempts to examine Lynette after being raped
