= The Conquest of You =

Studio album by Kid Creole and the Coconuts
- Released: 1997
- Genre: New wave, disco
- Length: 43:13
- Label: SPV
- Producer: August Darnell, Frank Loncar

Kid Creole and the Coconuts chronology
| Kiss Me Before the Light Changes (1995) | The Conquest of You (1997) | Too Cool to Conga! (2001) |

Professional ratings
Review scores
| Source | Rating |
|---|---|
| AllMusic | 2/5 stars |

The Conquest of You is an album by the American musical group Kid Creole and the Coconuts, released in 1997.

== Track listing ==
All tracks are written by August Darnell; except where indicated.

| No. | Title | Writer(s) | Length |
|---|---|---|---|
| 1. | "Forget About Love" | | 3:46 |
| 2. | "Bi Coastal" | | 4:00 |
| 3. | "Why Why" | | 4:21 |
| 4. | "Too Fat" | | 4:02 |
| 5. | "Conquest of You (Part 1)" | | 5:10 |
| 6. | "I Got My Handy On" | | 3:38 |
| 7. | "Heart of Gold" | | 4:05 |
| 8. | "Girl" | | 3:45 |
| 9. | "Edelweiss" | Darnell, Rodgers and Hammerstein | 3:29 |
| 10. | "Conquest of You (Part 2)" | | 3:26 |
| 11. | "Money" | | 3:30 |
