= Fresh Fruit in Foreign Places =

Studio album by Kid Creole and the Coconuts
- Released: June 1981
- Studio: Electric Lady, New York City; The Hit Factory, New York City
- Genre: Rock, disco
- Label: ZE; Island; Sire
- Producer: August Darnell, Andy Hernandez

Kid Creole and the Coconuts chronology
Off the Coast of Me (1980)	Fresh Fruit in Foreign Places (1981)	Tropical Gangsters (1982)

Singles from Fresh Fruit in Foreign Places
- 1. "Latin Music" b/w "Music Americana" Released: 1981; 2. "I Am" b/w "Dario" Released: August 1981; 3. "Going Places" b/w "In The Jungle"" Released: September 1981; 4. "Christmas In B'Dilli Bay (lead track: "Dear Addy")" Released: November 1982

Fresh Fruit in Foreign Places is the second album by Kid Creole and the Coconuts, released in 1981.

== Overview ==
Fresh Fruit in Foreign Places is a concept album in the form of a musical travelogue. Describing the album's concept to The New York Times, band leader August Darnell said:

One way of looking at the journey Kid Creole undertakes on the record is as a justification of the many strains that coexist in our music. The journey is autobiographical in that it explains how the music came to be the music that it is. Kid Creole and his crew visit various islands and are influenced by the music and culture of each one. ...You don't just leave your influences behind when you move on in life; you take them with you.

Fresh Fruit in Foreign Places was reissued in 2002 by Universal Island Records with 12" mixes of "Table Manners" and "Que Pasa / Me No Pop I" (although the latter is not the full version; it has been edited down from 7:11 to 6:18). The album replaced the original mix of "Dear Addy" with the 1982 single remix.

== Reception ==
Professional ratings
Review scores
Source	Rating
AllMusic	4/5 stars
Record Mirror	5/5 stars
The Rolling Stone Album Guide	2.5/5 stars
Spin Alternative Record Guide	8/10
The Village Voice	A−

Fresh Fruit in Foreign Places was very well received critically upon its release. New York Times pop music critic Robert Palmer called it "an extraordinary album" and "the freshest and most intelligent fusion of pop styles and dance rhythms in a long time". It was voted one of the best albums of the year in The Village Voice's influential Pazz & Jop critics' poll, and was ranked among the top ten albums of 1981 by NME.

== Track listing ==
All songs written by August Darnell except as indicated.

Side one
No.	Title	Writer(s)	Length
1.	"Going Places"		3:16
2.	"In the Jungle"		3:09
3.	"Animal Crackers"	Darnell, Giampietro Fanero	3:33
4.	"I Stand Accused"		3:07
5.	"Latin Music"		2:57
6.	"Musica Americana"	Andy Hernandez	2:53

Side two
No.	Title	Writer(s)	Length
7.	"I Am"	Andy Hernandez	3:47
8.	"Schweinerei"	Darnell, Adriana Kaegi	4:20
9.	"Gina, Gina"	Darnell, Ronnie Rogers	3:55
10.	"With a Girl Like Mimi"		3:28
11.	"Table Manners"		4:01
12.	"Dear Addy"		3:50

== Personnel ==
The Cast

- Kid Creole, Coati Mundi, Peter Schott, Mark Mazur, Carol Coleman, Andrew Lloyd, Winston Grennon, Yogi Horton, Lori Eastside, Adriana Kaegi, Cheryl Poirier, Don Arnone, Theodore "Dutch" Robinson, Beverly Britton Brown, Don Hamilton, Angelica de la Luna, Erroll Cornin, Rubens Bassini, Sam Turner, Steve Kroon, David Charles, Conjunto Libre (Andy Gonzalez, Dan Reagan, Jerry Gonzalez, Manny Oquendo), Freddie Harris, The Charles Lagond's Horns, The Jill Jeffe's Strings, Dominic Cortese, Sal Gallina

Technical credits

- August Darnell – producer, concept (based on a story), arrangements
- Sugar-Coated Andy Hernandez – co-producer, orchestrations, arrangements
- Michael Zilkha – executive-producer
- Michael Frondelli – chief engineer
- Tony Wright – cover, art direction
- Al Smith, Randy Hoffman, Tommy Mottola – management

== Charts ==
Chart (1981–1982)	Peak position
Swedish Albums (Sverigetopplistan)	40
UK Albums (OCC)	99
US Billboard 200	180
