= Machine (band) =

American musical group

- Origin: New York City, New York, United States
- Genres: Disco, pop, funk, rock
- Years active: 1977–1981, 2009–present
- Labels: RCA Victor, RCA
- Past members: August Darnell; Clare Bathé; Jay Stovall; Kevin Nance; Lonnie Ferguson; Melvin Lee

Machine is an American funk, disco and rock group, formed in New York City and originally active from 1977 to 1981. The band reached its biggest success with the single "There but for the Grace of God Go I", which became a disco hit in 1979, reaching #8 on the Billboard Hot Dance Club Play chart.

== Career ==
The band was originally formed by singer/guitarist Jay Stovall in 1973 with the release of the single "One Guy Too Late," written and produced by Van "Do the Hustle" McCoy on the United Artist records/Abbot label. The band was later reformed in 1977 New York City with the intent to create a funk rock group.

The band released its self-titled debut album in 1979, which produced its most famous single "There But For The Grace Of God Go I". The song describes two Latino parents named Carlos and Carmen Vidal who move out of the Bronx to protect their baby daughter. In their new surroundings, their daughter is cut off from her own heritage and becomes self-destructive from the Vidals' cosseting. When the daughter grows up, her parents find she is the type of person from whom all their peers are trying to protect their own children. It ends with the mother's conclusion that "Too much love is worse than none at all." The controversial lyrics ended up being censored twice: the original lyrics in the 3rd verse "popping pills and smoking weed" were changed to "gaining weight and losing sleep" and later the first verse lyrics, for the 7" single edit, "let's find a place they say, somewhere far away, with no blacks, no jews and no gays" were changed to "let's find a place they say, somewhere far away, where only upper class people stay".

"There But For The Grace Of God Go I" was a hit for the band, reaching number 77 on the Billboard Hot 100 and spending ten weeks on the chart. In Christgau's Record Guide: Rock Albums of the Seventies (1981), Robert Christgau said the song was "irresistible musically—still the disco disc of [1979]", although he found the rest of Machine's first album either "mildly arresting musically" or "ordinary Isleys-influenced black pop/funk/rock". Slant Magazine later named it the sixth greatest dance song, and Pitchfork Media included it in its collection of The Pitchfork 500.

Machine released its second and final album Moving On in 1980 with two accompanying singles, but the album suffered from poor sales. The group disbanded the following year, and August Darnell, the group's most successful producer, went on to form Kid Creole and the Coconuts, who released a cover of "There but for the Grace of God Go I" in 1980. In 2009, three of the band's original members, Jay Stovall, Kevin Nance, and Clare Bathé, reformed the act for a tour.

== Discography ==
=== Albums ===
- Machine (1979)
- Moving On (1980)

=== Singles ===
- "There but For the Grace of God Go I" (RCA Victor, 1979) (Billboard Hot 100 #77, Billboard Hot R&B/Hip-Hop Songs #91, Billboard Hot Dance Club Play #8)
- "Is It Love" / "I Finally Found" (RCA Victor, 1980) (Billboard Hot Dance Club Play #27)
- "Power and Reason" / "Thunder, Lightning, and Rain" (RCA, 1980)

== In popular culture ==
An altered version of "There but for the Grace of God Go I," was featured in the 2016 Netflix series The Get Down. In season 1, episode 2 ("Seek Those Who Fan Your Flames"), Mylene Cruz (portrayed by Herizen F. Guardiola) enlists the help of Ezekiel "Zeke" Figuero (portrayed by Justice Smith) to write a song for her church solo so that she may impress music producer Jackie Moreno (portrayed by Kevin Corrigan). The song that Zeke writes is untitled, but it is known that it is "There but for the Grace of God Go I," as Zeke muses aloud on the lyrics. Mylene gives a powerful introduction to the song, seemingly overtaken by the Holy Spirit, and the chorus is chanted/sung in Spanish ("antes de la gloria de Dios, ay voy yo") by Mylene and a few members of the choir before she launches into the song in English, with piano accompaniment by Zeke. The lyrics were changed in this version; for instance, "let's find a place they say, somewhere far away, with no Blacks, no Jews and no gays" was changed to "let's find a place to stay, somewhere far away, where they do and play and sing as they may."

Jay Stovall appeared in 2017 on "The People's Court " in episode titled "Sizzling Mad Disco Singer".

The song was featured in Grand Theft Auto: Episodes from Liberty City.
