= Kiss Me Before the Light Changes =

Studio album by Kid Creole and the Coconuts
- Released: June 1995
- Recorded: Planet Sound, NYC, Unique Recording, NYC, Big Noise, NYC, Giddyness Studios, Sheffield, England
- Genre: New wave, disco
- Length: 59:16
- Label: Hot Productions
- Producer: August Darnell, Takashi "Gitane" Yoshinaga

Kid Creole and the Coconuts chronology
To Travel Sideways (1995)	Kiss Me Before the Light Changes (1995)	The Conquest of You (1997)

Professional ratings
Review scores
Source	Rating
AllMusic	2.5/5 stars
The Village Voice	*

Kiss Me Before the Light Changes is the eleventh studio album released by American musical group Kid Creole and the Coconuts. It was the second of two albums released by the group in 1995.

== Track listing ==
All tracks are written by August Darnell; except where indicated.

No.	Title	Writer(s)	Length
1.	"But I Got You"		4:20
2.	"What If..."		3:47
3.	"Heaven Knows"		4:35
4.	"Why Didn't I Pull Out?"	Darnell, Stony Browder Jr.	4:31
5.	"Patterdale Way"		5:33
6.	"To Travel Sideways"		6:12
7.	"Kiss Me Before the Light Changes"	Darnell, Julian McBrown, Becker, Karen Smallwood	4:44
8.	"Simple Mind"	Kome Kome Club	4:47
9.	"Haiti"		4:32
10.	"Hold On! Hold On!"		4:15
11.	"Stop Sweatin' Me"		3:30
12.	"Grimaldi"		4:51
13.	"God Bless You"	Dankan, Okuno	4:08
