= Deputy of Love =

Song by Don Armando's Second Avenue Rhumba Band
- A-side: "I'm an Indian, Too"
- Released: 1979
- Genre: Disco
- Length: 3:20
- Label: ZE
- Songwriter: Ron Rogers

"Deputy of Love" is a 1979 disco single by Don Armando.

== Background ==
The words and music were composed by Ron Rogers, a songwriter from the South Bronx, who also played piano on the Ze Records recording. Rogers went on to write and produce several other dance records. The song went to number one on both U.S. and international Billboard Disco Charts, becoming the last single to hit the top spot during the 1970s, but did not reach either the US Billboard Hot 100 or Billboard R&B chart. The vocalist on "Deputy of Love", Fonda Rae, was later successful on the dance and soul charts during the 1980s.
