= I Wake Up Screaming (album) =

Studio album by Kid Creole and the Coconuts
- Released: 12 September 2011
- Label: Strut
- Producer: August Darnell, Picture Book, Brennan Green

Kid Creole and the Coconuts chronology
Too Cool to Conga! (2001)	I Wake Up Screaming (2011)

Singles from I Wake Up Screaming
- 1. "I Do Believe" Released: 14 July 2011

I Wake Up Screaming is the fourteenth studio album released by the American musical group Kid Creole and the Coconuts. It was released in 2011 and includes the single "I Do Believe". The title of the album comes from the 1941 film noir I Wake Up Screaming.

== Reception ==
Professional ratings
Review scores
Source	Rating
Allmusic	4/5 stars
Spin	7/10

== Track listing ==
All tracks are written by August Darnell, except where indicated.

No.	Title	Writer(s)	Length
1.	"Stony and Cory"	August Darnell, Andy Butler	4:10
2.	"I Wake Up Screaming (In the Tropics)"		3:37
3.	"Somebody's Got to Lose"		3:09
4.	"I Do Believe" (Featuring Sweet Knave)	Darnell, Butler	4:05
5.	"Long Live the King"		5:16
6.	"Verily Verily Verily"		4:44
7.	"Tudor-Jones"		6:36
8.	"Attitude"	Darnell, Butler	3:31
9.	"This is My Life"		4:03
10.	"We're Rockin' Out Tonight"	Darnell, Butler	3:34
11.	"Love Remains"		4:22
12.	"Blow Me Up" (Featuring Chris Storr)		3:55
13.	"Just Because I Love You" (Featuring Edgar Jones, not included on 2xLP edition)		4:29
