= Too Cool to Conga! =

Studio album by Kid Creole and the Coconuts
- Released: 5 June 2001
- Genre: New wave, disco
- Length: 52:21
- Label: BMG Ariola München GmbH, Snapper Music
- Producer: August Darnell

Kid Creole and the Coconuts chronology
The Conquest of You (1997)	Too Cool to Conga! (2001)	I Wake Up Screaming (2011)

Professional ratings
Review scores
Source	Rating
AllMusic	3/5 stars
The Encyclopedia of Popular Music	2/5 stars

Too Cool to Conga! is a studio album by the American musical group Kid Creole and the Coconuts, released in 2001.

== Production ==
Bongo Eddie was the only returning member of the Coconuts.

== Critical reception ==
The Press wrote that "these are joyous songs that will please the fans, who will delight in the remake of 'Endicott' and the title track 'Too Cool To Conga'." The Washington Post wrote that "the finger-snapping dance tunes are as irresistible as ever, even if they arrive too late to take advantage of the late-'90s swing revival."

== Track listing ==
All tracks are written by August Darnell.

No.	Title	Length
1.	"Let's Jam!"	4:23
2.	"Flip, Flop and Fly/My Gal's a Jockey"	8:07
3.	"Man, Oh Man"	4:50
4.	"Personal Assistant"	4:26
5.	"I Saw Her First"	4:19
6.	"Stingy Brim"	3:31
7.	"Savanna" (Not included on all editions)	5:07
8.	"Who's Your Daddy Now?"	5:40
9.	"Endicott"	6:16
10.	"Get Rid"	4:49
11.	"Too Cool to Conga"	6:05
12.	"1+1=1" (Not included on all editions)	4:05
13.	"Choo Choo Cha Boogie" (Not included on all editions)	4:09

Alternative track listings

Some editions do not include "Savanna", "1+1=1" and "Choo Choo Cha Boogie", but include either "I'm Not Your Papa" (Mukupa featuring Kid Creole) or "I Love Muchachacha" as the final track.
