= Off the Coast of Me =

Studio album by Kid Creole and the Coconuts
- Released: August 1980
- Studio: Chappell Hall and Blank Tapes, New York City
- Genre: Disco, latin, rock
- Label: ZE; Island
- Producer: August Darnell

Kid Creole and the Coconuts chronology
Off the Coast of Me (1980)	Fresh Fruit in Foreign Places (1981)

Singles from Off the Coast of Me
- 1. "Maladie D'Amour" b/w "Adnaloy" Released: August 1980

Off the Coast of Me is the debut album by Kid Creole and the Coconuts, released in 1980. The album was reissued in 2003 with additional bonus tracks by Universal Island Records.

== Production ==
The album kicked off a loose narrative—Kid Creole's search for good times and his "dream babe," Mimi—that continued over the course of the next few albums. It was produced by August Darnell.

== Critical reception ==
Professional ratings
Review scores
Source	Rating
AllMusic	4/5 stars
Robert Christgau	B+
The Encyclopedia of Popular Music	3/5 stars
The Rolling Stone Album Guide	2/5 stars
Smash Hits	8/10
Spin Alternative Record Guide	9/10

Trouser Press wrote that the album's "uniqueness and danceability, along with the Kid's occasionally risqué wordplay, are enough to suggest the band's potential."

== Track listing ==
All tracks are written by August Darnell, except where indicated.

Side one
No.	Title	Writer(s)	Length
1.	"Mister Softee"		4:25
2.	"Maladie d'Amour"	Darnell, Andy Hernandez	4:59
3.	"Yolanda"		4:23
4.	"Off the Coast of Me"		4:51

Side two
No.	Title	Writer(s)	Length
1.	"Darrio..."		4:02
2.	"Lili Marlene"	Hans Leip, Norbert Schultze, Tommie Connor	3:55
3.	"Bogota Affair"		4:29
4.	"Calypso Pan American"	Darnell, Stony Browder	5:22

2003 reissue bonus tracks
No.	Title	Writer(s)	Length
9.	"There But for the Grace of God Go I" (12" mix)	Darnell, Kevin Nance	5:27
10.	"He's Not Such a Bad Guy After All" (12" B-side)		5:13
11.	"Darrio..." (12" disco mix)		5:12
12.	"Yolanda" (12" mix)		6:42
13.	"Maladie d'Amour" (Mutant Disco Version)	Darnell, Hernandez	6:15

== Personnel ==
Performers

- Kid Creole – vocals
- The Coconuts (Adriana Kaegi, Brooksie Wells, Fonda Rae, Lourdes Cotto) – vocals
- Peter Schott – piano
- Franz Krauns – guitar
- Coati Mundi – vibes
- Andrew Lloyd – percussion
- Winston Grennan – drums
- Tommy Browder – bass

Technical credits

- August Darnell – producer
- Michael Zilkha – directed by (executive producer)
- Sugar-Coated Andy Hernandez (1–6, 8) – orchestrations
- Stony Browder Jr. – orchestrations (7)
- Bobby Blank and Jules McBrown – engineering
- August Darnell and Robert Blank – mixing
- Tony Wright – art direction
- George Dubose – photography
- Richard Cramer – typography and graphics
