= Dutch Robinson =

American singer-songwriter

Dutch "Teddy" Robinson is a singer, songwriter and music producer. He is from South Bronx, New York, and was one of the original lead singers with the Ohio Players. After leaving the Players, Dutch went on to produce such hits as "I Ain't Got Nothin" (later to be sampled by Bone Thugs-n-Harmony in 2002 for "Money Money"), and "Can't Get Along Without You". He was also a member of the short-lived Elbow Bones and the Racketeers and was the founder and leading singer/songwriter of "Life". He was a native of New York, USA, and in the late 1980s he moved to Halifax, Nova Scotia in Canada, then to Montreal in the early 2000s. While in Montreal, he performed with Cirque du Soleil's "Drum". In 2010, he performed in the opening ceremonies of the Winter Olympic Games in Vancouver, British Columbia, Canada. He released his latest album, entitled "Freedom", on September 6, 2013. The album is available in full on his website www.downloaddutch.com. He is the father of 6 children. One of his sons, Zaz, is also a musician under the name "I Am Zaz".

== Awards ==
- 3 ECMA awards
- 2 ANSMA awards
- Black Businessman's award
- Nova Scotia Music Award (for the album Life)
- Inducted to the R&B Hall of Fame (October 2013)
