= Elbow Bones and the Racketeers =

- Origin: US
- Genres: Male/female vocalists
- Labels: EMI

Elbow Bones and the Racketeers was an American big band-era styled male/female vocal group, created by August Darnell, and best known for their hit single "A Night in New York", written by Ron Rogers and Deborah Clarkin, and released on the EMI label. It was sung by Stephanie Fuller. It entered the UK Singles Chart on 14 January 1984. It remained in there for nine weeks, reaching #33.

Elbow Bones was the alter ego of writer/photographer John Rynski, who had become friendly with Darnell after working as his stage and lighting man on the Kid Creole and the Coconuts tours. Rynski believed Darnell had given him his nickname as he had "elbowed" his way into Darnell's entourage: he said, "I did anything for them just to be there and hang out".

In 2012, Rogers and lead singer Stephanie Fuller reunited to do a promo for a remastered version of their 1983 album New York at Dawn, which included six additional remixed tracks.

== Discography ==
Studio albums

- New York at Dawn (EMI America, 1983)

Singles

- "A Night in New York" b/w "Happy Times" (November 1983) US R&B #82, US Dance #24, UK #33
- "Happy Birthday, Baby" b/w "I Got You" (April 1984) (UK only) UK #94
- "I Call It Like I See It" b/w "You Got Me High" (1984) (NL only)
