= Kid Creole and the Coconuts =

American musical group

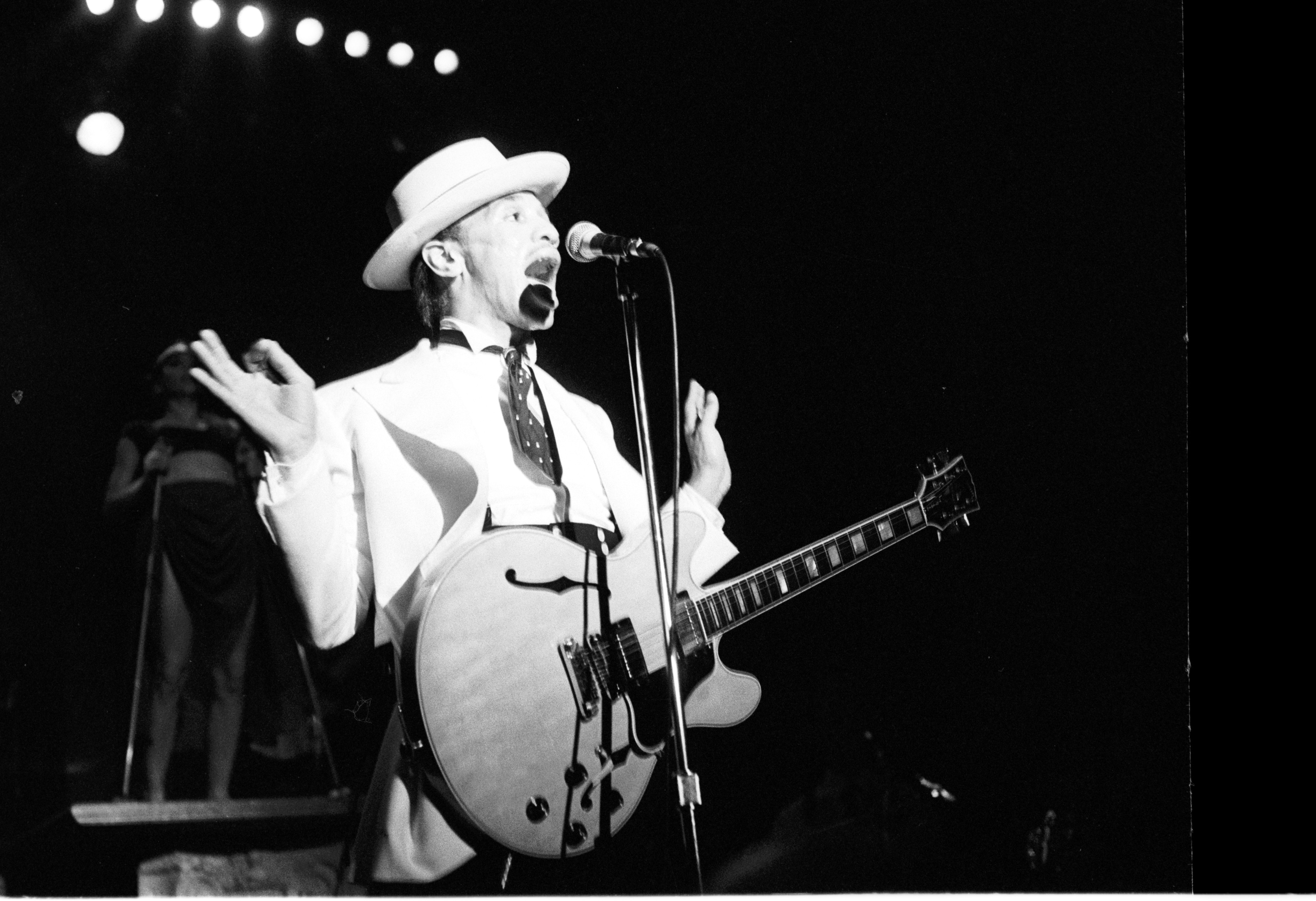
- August Darnell as Kid Creole, in concert in 1987

Background information
- Origin: New York City
- Genres: Disco; Latin
- Years active: 1980–present
- Labels: ZE, Island, Sire/Warner Bros, 2C2C Music.
- Members: August Darnell; Mark Anthony Jones; Eva Tudor-Jones; Mike Gorman; Dave Imby; Jamie McCredie; Barnaby Dickinson; Edgar Jones; Otto Williams; Chris Storr; George Hogg; Roos van Rossum; Charlotte de Graaf; Kristina Hanford
- Past members: Andy Hernandez; Adriana Kaegi; Fonda Rae; Cory Daye; Mark Mazur; Cheryl Poirier; Taryn Hagey; Janique Svedberg; Jimmy Ripp (Rippetoe); Peter Schott; Carol Colman; Dizzy Daniel Moorehead; Charlie Lagond; Lee Robertson; Kenny Fradley; Winston Grennan; Andrew Lloyd 'Bongo' Eddie Folk; Simon 'Franco' Frost; Mette 'May' Berggreen; Heidi Bjerre; Perri Lister
- Website: www.kidcreoleandthecoconuts.com

Kid Creole and the Coconuts is an American musical group created by singer August "Kid Creole" Darnell with percussionist Andy Hernandez and singer Adriana Kaegi. Its music incorporates a variety of styles and influences, in particular a mix of disco and Latin American, Caribbean, and big band jazz in the vein of Cab Calloway. The Coconuts are a trio of female backing vocalists/dancers, founded and originally choreographed and costumed by Kaegi.

== Career ==
Thomas August Darnell Browder was born in The Bronx, New York City on August 12, 1950. His mother was from South Carolina and his father from Savannah, Georgia. As an adult, Browder began going by his two middle names as August Darnell.

Growing up in the Bronx, Darnell was exposed early on to all kinds of music. Darnell began his musical career in a band named The In-Laws with his brother, Stony Browder, in 1965. The band disbanded so Darnell could pursue a career as an English teacher. Darnell obtained a master's degree in English, but in 1974 again formed a band with his brother under the name Dr. Buzzard's Original Savannah Band. Their self-titled debut release was a Top 40-charting album which was certified gold and was nominated for a Grammy.

Darnell began producing for other artists, such as Don Armando's Second Avenue Rhumba Band and Gichy Dan's Beachwood No. 9, before adopting the name Kid Creole (adapted from the Elvis Presley film King Creole) in 1980 and co-founder Adriana "Addy" Kaegi came up with the name The Coconuts. The Kid wore zoot suits and danced onstage in a style reminiscent of films of the 1930s and 1940s, and fronted a multi-racial, multi-cultural band. Additional co-founders of the band were Darnell and his Savannah Band associate vibraphone player Andy Hernandez, also known as his "trusty sidekick" Coati Mundi. Hernandez served as Darnell's on-stage comic foil, as well as his musical director and arranger.

The original Coconuts, a collection of glamorous and often skimpily attired female backing vocalists, were led by Kaegi, who also served as the choreographer and costume designer of the Coconuts. Early recordings featured a Coconuts lineup of Kaegi, Cheryl Lee Poirier, Fonda Rae, and Lourdes Cotton; Lori Eastside was also a Coconut on a handful of early singles. By 1982, the Coconuts were a trio of Kaegi, Cheryl Poirier, and Taryn Hagey. This lineup of the Coconuts recorded a spin-off album project in 1983, with Poirier taking the lead vocalist role on EMI.

Throughout the 1980s, the band also included Peter Schott on keyboards (Schott also occasionally co-composed material with Darnell), drummer David Span, bass player Carol Colman, and legendary Jamaican drummer Winston Grennan. With horn players, percussionists, and other adjunct members, the full band lineup often swelled to over a dozen players.

Kid Creole and the Coconuts' debut album Off the Coast of Me was critically well-received but not successful commercially. They made their national TV debut performing "Mister Softee" and "There But For The Grace of God Go I" on Saturday Night Live in November 1980. The second release, Fresh Fruit in Foreign Places, was a concept album matched with a New York Public Theater stage production; it received positive reviews, with Darnell recognized as a clever lyricist and astute composer, arranger and producer. By the second album they were accompanied by the Pond Life horn section Charlie Lagond, Ken Fradley, and Lee Robertson, as well as lead guitarist Mark Mazur. The album charted briefly, and subsequently Coati Mundi's early Latin rap "Me No Pop I", though not originally on the album, became a Top 40 UK hit single. It was the band's first hit.

Their breakthrough came with 1982's Tropical Gangsters, which hit #3 in the UK and spun off three Top 10 hits with "Stool Pigeon", "Annie, I'm Not Your Daddy" and "I'm A Wonderful Thing, Baby". "Dear Addy" also made the Top 40. In the US the album was retitled Wise Guy and reached #145, and "I'm a Wonderful Thing, Baby" flirted with the R&B charts.

Their live shows at this time were among the most propulsive and enchanting of the period, with outlandish dancing and cod theatricals garnishing the Latin beats."

Darnell subsequently produced a 1983 spin-off album for the Coconuts with Cheryl Poirier on lead vocals. Coati Mundi also released his solo LP The Former 12 Year Old Genius before the fourth Kid Creole and the Coconuts album in 1983; Doppelganger was a relative commercial disappointment, despite the single "There's Something Wrong in Paradise" reaching the UK Top 40. In 1983, Kid Creole formed a new swing big band, Elbow Bones and the Racketeers, and he gained the hit "Night in New York".

The group performed the song "My Male Curiosity" (with choreography by Kaegi) for the 1984 movie Against All Odds; the song also appeared on the best-selling soundtrack album.

The Coconuts also sang background vocals in the songs "Red Light" and "Surrender" on U2's album War, which was released on 28 February 1983 on Island Records.

Darnell and Kaegi divorced in 1985, though she remained with the band. Taryn Hagey dropped out of The Coconuts around the same time, and the two remaining Coconuts (Adriana Kaegi and Cheryl Poirier) formed their own spin-off group Boomerang with Perri Lister. This group released a dance-oriented album, somewhat different in sound to their Coconuts recordings, on the Atlantic label in 1986. The producer was David Kershenbaum.

Kid Creole and the Coconuts continued, now with third Coconut Janique Svedberg replacing the departed Hagey. On record, though billed as guests and not as Coconuts, during this era some female co-lead vocals were performed by Haitia Fuller and Cory Daye. In the mid to late 1980s, the group contributed to various film soundtracks and other such projects. They also appeared at the Montreux Jazz Festival in 1986 and in this period released the albums In Praise of Older Women... and Other Crimes (which included the single "Endicott") and I, Too, Have Seen the Woods, neither of which charted in the US. Still, the group continued world tours, performed sold-out shows at Carnegie Hall in New York City, and was invited by Princess Diana to perform at a private function in the UK.

In 1987, Kid Creole and the Coconuts made their only appearance on the US Hot 100 charts with "Hey Mambo", a track from Barry Manilow's Swing Street album. The single, credited to "Barry Manilow with Kid Creole & The Coconuts", peaked at #90. The band also performed on The Tonight Show Starring Johnny Carson.

Longtime associate Hernandez left the ensemble before 1990's Private Waters in the Great Divide, an album described by the NME as "a return to form with inspired lyrics and buckets of the type of sexual innuendo that Creole has made his own." The band had a UK hit with the single "The Sex of It", a song written by Prince and recorded at Paisley Park Studios with Sheila E and Levi Seacer, Jr. Except for Darnell's vocal, the track is entirely performed by Prince and his associates; it is the group's last major hit to date.

After the 1992 Kid Creole and the Coconuts album You Shoulda Told Me You Were... failed to achieve significant commercial success, the group splintered. The female backing trio all left and have been replaced with a rotating group of new Coconuts. With a revised and slimmed-down lineup, the band kept releasing albums throughout the '90s on independent labels, though none of the recordings received much attention or wide distribution. Despite still touring, the band went into a 10-year recording hiatus after their 2001 album Too Cool to Conga!, re-emerging in 2011 with I Wake Up Screaming.

Kid Creole and The Coconuts have appeared in a number of films, such as Downtown 81 (1981), an art film starring Jean-Michel Basquiat, Against All Odds (1984), and the Lambada-themed The Forbidden Dance (1990); they also starred in a UK-produced TV movie in 1984 titled There's Something Wrong in Paradise, based around the group's songs from the Doppelganger album and produced for Granada Television. Andy Hernandez has also made appearances in a number of films separately, and Adriana Kaegi produced and directed a documentary film about the band called Kid Creole and My Coconuts. She now runs her media production company in New York and has her own Styleculture.tv channel. They also composed music for the 1999 French animated series Pirate Family.

== Present ==
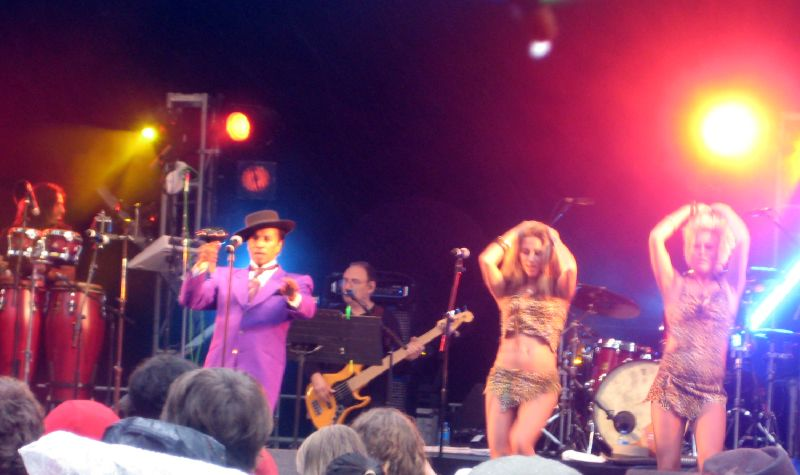
Kid Creole and the Coconuts performing at Ascot Racecourse in 2008

Darnell still tours with the current Coconuts: Roos van Rossum and Charlotte de Graaf (both from the Netherlands) and Kristina Hanford from Memphis Tennessee. Darnell's now wife, Eva Tudor-Jones, who was Mama Coconut for more than 20 years, now manages all the operations.

Darnell now has his own indie record label called 2C2C Music. He runs it with his business partners Peter Schott and Eva Tudor-Jones. The partners founded the label in 2018 and have since released some new Kid Creole and the Coconuts music. The label also recently released Off the Coast of Me (40th Anniversary Edition) to celebrate the album's 40 years since its first release. And in 2021, the label released the album Nothin' Left but the Rest.

In 2008, for the last time, Kid Creole toured the UK starring in the stage show Oh! What a Night, a disco musical produced by Random Concerts.

Kid Creole and the Coconuts' most recent studio album, entitled I Wake Up Screaming, was released on September 12, 2011 on !K7/Strut Records.

At the end of 2010, Kid Creole and the Coconuts toured Germany with The Night of the Proms, also starring Boy George and Sir Cliff Richard. They previously appeared in the Night of the Proms in the Netherlands and Belgium in 2007 with Chic, Macy Gray and Donna Summer.

== Discography ==
- Off the Coast of Me (1980)
- Fresh Fruit in Foreign Places (1981)
- Tropical Gangsters (1982) (released in the U.S. as Wise Guy)
- Doppelganger (1983)
- In Praise of Older Women... and Other Crimes (1985)
- I, Too, Have Seen the Woods (1987)
- Private Waters in the Great Divide (1990)
- You Shoulda Told Me You Were... (1991)
- KC2 Plays K2C (1993) (Japan only, backed by Kome Kome Club)
- To Travel Sideways (1995)
- Kiss Me Before the Light Changes (1995)
- The Conquest of You (1997)
- Too Cool to Conga! (2001)
- I Wake Up Screaming (2011)

== Awards ==
- Brit Awards (1983): International Artist

== Filmography ==
- Against All Odds (1984)
- The Forbidden Dance is Lambada (1990)
- Only You (1992)
- Downtown 81 (2000)
