= Ron Rogers =

US songwriter & composer (born 1952)

Ronald Bruce Rogers (born November 5, 1952), better known as Ron Rogers or Ronnie Rogers, is a songwriter, composer, recording artist and record producer from New York City. His career spanned from the late 1970s until the 1990s.

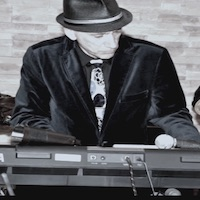
Ron Rogers

== Life and career ==
Rogers was born in Soundview, South Bronx, New York in 1952.

After recording a debut RCA Victor LP entitled Gichy Dan’s Beachwood # 9, co-produced with songwriter August Darnell, Rogers composed the words and music to Don Armando's hit "Deputy of Love", which reached number one on the Billboard U.S. dance chart. Following this initial success, Michael Zilkha, founder of ZE Records, began publishing Rogers' compositions through Island Records. The compositions were recorded on 24-track analog recording decks by New York session musicians, including Rogers multitracking on piano, drums and vocals. Among the disco-inspired recordings were: "Spooks In Space" by The Aural Exciters, written by Rogers; Gichy Dan's "Cowboys and Gangsters", written and produced by Rogers; and Rogers' own solo EP "Don't Play With My Emotions", all released on ZE Records / Arista Records / Island Records.

Rogers went on to compose, produce and perform on recordings including "The Lifeboat Party", lead track of the Kid Creole and the Coconuts album Doppelganger; "Gina Gina", from Kid Creole's Fresh Fruit in Foreign Places LP; "City Nights/ Manhattan Cafe's" and "In The Middle Of The Night", released on Rogers' own Blue Chip record label, featuring vocalist Cory Daye of Dr. Buzzard's Original Savannah Band; and Elbow Bones and the Racketeers' UK Top 40 hit "A Night In New York", co-written with lyricist D. Clarkin and released on EMI. In total Rogers has writing or production credits on over 30 recordings.

== Selected discography ==
* (#)X = denotes re-issues/remixes+number of releases

Year	Song (s)	Producer (s)	Written By	Artist	Title/Label
1979	Deputy of Love* (8)	August Darnell / Andy Hernandez	Ron Rogers	Don Armando	Don Armando's Rhumba Band / Ze Records
1978	all cuts	Ron Rogers / August Darnell	August Darnell	Gichy Dan	Gichy Dan's Beachwood # 9 / RCA
1983	The Lifeboat Party * 3X	August Darnell	Ron Rogers / August Darnell	Kid Creole and the Coconuts	Doppelganger ZE / Island Records
1984	Take Me For A Night In NY* 2X	August Darnell	Ron Rogers / D. Clarkin	Elbow Bones and the Racketeers	New York At Dawn / EMI America
1983	Cowboys & Gangsters * 5X	Ron Rogers	Ron Rogers	Gichy Dan	Gichy Dan / ZE / Island Records
1979	Spooks In Space* 5X	Bob Blank	Ron Rogers	Aural Exciters	Spooks In Space / ZE
1987	So Far So Good * 2X	Ron Rogers	Ron Rogers August Darnell	Kid Creole	I Too Have Seen The Woods / Sire Records
1986	City Nights / Manhattan Cafe's	Ron Rogers	Ron Rogers / B.D.Hutz	Cory Daye	Cory Daye / Profile Records
1987	Gina Gina	August Darnell	Ron Rogers / August Darnell	Kid Creole and the Coconuts	Fresh Fruit In Foreign Places / Ze Records
1987	In The Middle Of The Night - all cuts	Ron Rogers	Ron Rogers	Cory Daye	In The Middle of the Night / Blue Chip / Profile Records
1983	Don't Play With My Emotions * (2) - all cuts	Ron Rogers / Vince Traina	Ron Rogers	Ron Rogers	Don't Play With My Emotions / ZE / Island Records
1983	Piranana * (2) - all cuts	Ron Rogers	Ron Rogers / Caroline Loeb	Caroline Loeb	Piranana / ZE
1995	Dr. Paradise	Ron Rogers	August Darnell	Kid Creole	Private Waters in the Great Divide / Columbia
1995	Calling Out to Marlboro	Ron Rogers	August Darnell Ron Rogers	Kid Creole	Traveling Sideways / ---
2004	Naughty Boy / YA YA	Ron Rogers	Ron Rogers	Ron Rogers	Mutant Disco / Strut Records
2009	Various cuts	Ron Rogers	Ron Rogers	Compilation	Zevolution / Strut Records
