= Adriana Kaegi =

Swiss-born American actress, producer and singer (born 1957)

Adriana Kaegi (born March 17, 1957) is a Swiss-born American actress, producer, and former singer.

== Career ==
Kaegi co-founded the band Kid Creole and the Coconuts together with August Darnell and Coati Mundi, both formerly of Dr. Buzzard's Original Savannah Band.

The band won the British Music Award for Best International Live Act, and Kaegi appeared with the band on The Tonight Show, Saturday Night Live, the movie Against All Odds, the presidential inauguration of George H. W. Bush, a benefit hosted by Princess Diana for the children's charity Barnardo's, the 40th anniversary of the UN, and a performance at Carnegie Hall with Cab Calloway. She has also sung with U2, Miguel Bosé, Towa Tei, Vodka Collins and created the all-female band Boomerang, with Cheryl Poirier and Perry Lister.

Kaegi made a documentary film about her journey with Kid Creole and the Coconuts, and in 2009 released her first solo CD Tag.

Kaegi's media company was an early adopter of video content for the web. She conceived, produced and hosted the first interactive, monthly live webcast series from New York's Knitting Factory called "Cyber Cabaret", which received "Best live web cast" awards from Yahoo! and CNET in 1998, then went on to produce and promote live and on-demand webcasts for the fashion brands and magazines Style and Elle covering runway shows from New York, Paris and Milan. Today, her media company creates premium video content for @Styleculture.tv, her owned and operated channel, and distributes short editorial clips seen by millions globally, via aggregator and wire services.

Adriana Kaegi extensive fashion video coverage of designer and celebrity interviews, runway fashion and backstage footage, from 2009 until today will soon be available for sale.

As an artist, Adriana Kaegi enjoys creating video art with original soundtracks.

== Discography ==
- Me No Pop I (12") Antilles 1980
- Off the Coast of Me (LP, album) ZE Records, Island Records 1980
- Fresh Fruit in Foreign Places (LP, album) Schweinerei ZE Records, Island Records 1981
- Tropical Gangsters (LP, Album) ZE Records, Island Records 1982
- Don't Take My Coconuts (Album) (3 versions) EMI America 1983
- Doppelganger (album) (2 versions) Island Records … 1983
- War (Album) (44 versions) Red Light, Surrender` Island Records … 1983
- Boomerang (2 versions) Atlantic 1986
- These Boots Are Made For Walkin' (12") Night Train Vocal / L… Atlantic 1986
- When The Phone Stops Ringing (12", Maxi) Atlantic, WEA 1986
- New York At Dawn (CD, Album) Other Guys EMI USA, Toshiba EMI Ltd 1990
- Private Waters In The Great Divide (CD, album) CBS 1990
- Sound Museum (album) (3 versions) Tamilano EastWest Japan … 1997
- Tag (solo album) BEST of the month on Amazon 2009
- Going Out (single) 2010 Kaegi/Rogers 2011 BMI
- He Delivers (single) 2011 Kaegi/Rogers 2011 BMI
- Lock and Load (single) 2012 Kaegi/Rogers 2012 BMI
- Occupy my Heart (part of a compilation) 2012 Kaegi/Mercenck BMI/Gemma
- EDM for Living (soundtrack album 2022 by Adriana Kaegi)

== Filmography/Director/Producer ==
- Against All Odds (1984)
- https://vimeo.com/ondemand/kidcreoleandmycoconuts
- Patricia Field (2013)
- Social X Rays (2014), premiered at ASOFF Fashion Film Festival at Centre Pompidou in Paris

Series streamed on Styleculture.tv on Roku and AmazonFireTV

- 2022 Cities in a Hurry Paris Episode 1
- 2022 Cities in a Hurry New York City Episode 2
- 2023 Cities in a Hurry Los Angeles Episode 3
- 2023 Cities in a Hurry Washington DC Episode 4
- 2022 New York Fashion Week Episode 1
- 2022 Gita Goes to NYFW Episode 2
- 2023 New York Fashion Week Make it Happen Episode 3
- 2022 Paris Fashion Week Episode 1
- 2023 Paris Fashion Week Episode 2
