= Coati Mundi (musician) =

American percussionist

- Also known as: "Sugar Coated" Andy Hernandez
- Born: Andy Hernandez; January 3, 1950 (age 76)
- Origin: New York City, New York, U.S.
- Occupations: Musician; Record producer
- Instruments: Vibraphone, vocals
- Years active: 1970s–present
- Label: ZE Records

Andy Hernandez (born January 3, 1950), better known by his stage name Coati Mundi, is an American musician, percussionist, notably playing the vibraphone, and a member of Dr. Buzzard's Original Savannah Band, then of Kid Creole and the Coconuts. He scored the Top 40 UK hit "Me No Pop I" in 1981. He produced and arranged an album by Don Armando's Second Avenue Rhumba Band, which spurred the disco hit song "Deputy of Love".

== Early life ==
Hernandez is a first-generation Puerto Rican who grew up in Spanish Harlem, New York City. As a young teenager, the first band he played and recorded with was called Eddie Hernandez & his Orchestra.

He learned to play the vibraphone from George Rodriguez of The New Swing Sextet.

== Career ==
Hernandez has worked with assorted musical groups and artists including Ralfi Pagan, Joe Bataan, Vernon Reid, N'Dea Davenport, Nona Hendryx, Tito Puente, Manny Oquendo & Conjunto Libre, Hall & Oates and Machito.

He was known as Sugarcoated Andy while in Dr. Buzzard's band and played vibes, marimba and percussion for them. He credits Stony Browder, August Darnell and Cory Daye of Dr. Buzzard's band as major influences.

In 1980, along with Adriana Kaegi, he helped create Kid Creole and the Coconuts. Hernandez was the musical director and arranger for the Coconuts band until his departure in 1989.

His single "Me No Pop I" reached #32 on the British charts in summer 1981. The song was ranked at #3 among the top ten "Tracks of the Year" for 1981 by NME.

Hernandez is a self-taught musician. His main instrument is the vibraphone but he also plays piano, percussion, and flute, and is a music arranger and composer.

In 1983, he released a solo album titled Little Coati Mundi The Former 12 Year Old Genius. Mundi composed, produced and provided the lead vocals. It contained a version of Captain Beefheart's "Tropical Hot Dog Night" featuring salsa singer Rubén Blades. The album also featured former Kid Creole & The Coconuts singer Lori Eastside.

Coati Mundi had several appearances on the TV show Miami Vice including the episode "No Exit" with Bruce Willis and "Everybody's in Showbiz" with Benicio del Toro (see List of Miami Vice guest appearances). Hernandez appeared as an actor in the film Who's That Girl starring Madonna and Griffin Dunne. He wrote and performed a song for the soundtrack album called: "El Coco Loco". Mundi has acted in several Spike Lee films, including Mo' Better Blues, He Got Game and Girl 6. He can also be seen in the films Red Doors, Get Crazy, and We Own the Night.

He is credited as one of the music supervisors for the Miramax film 54 and as producer of several of the film's songs. Hernandez has composed music for various films, including Spike of Bensonhurst. He is also the composer and sound designer for a series of educational DVDs for children produced by Karyn Parsons (Fresh Prince of Bel-Air).

In December 2010 he released a new solo CD Coati Mundi Is Dancing For The Cabana Code In The Land Of Boo-Hoo (Rong Music). The recording has garnered favorable reviews and praises by the New York Times, Time Out magazine, Village Voice and others.

On December 16, 2010, he appeared in the line-up on the BBC music/comedy show Never Mind the Buzzcocks.

== Discography ==
=== Studio albums ===
- The Former 12 Year Old Genius (Virgin Records, 1983)
- Dancing for the Cabana Code in the Land Of Boo-Hoo (Rong Music, 2010)

=== Singles ===
- "Que Pasa" / "Me No Pop I" (Island/ZE, 1981) UK #32, NL #48
- "¿Como Esta Usted?" (Virgin, 1983)
- "Oh! That Love Decision" (Virgin, 1983)
- "No More Blues" (Rong Music, 2009)
