= August Darnell =

American musician (born 1950)

- Darnell in 1987

Background information
- Also known as: Kid Creole
- Born: Thomas August Darnell Browder; August 12, 1950 (age 76); The Bronx, New York City, U.S.
- Occupations: Singer, songwriter, bandleader, record producer
- Instrument: Bass
- Years active: 1965–present
- Spouse(s): Adriana Kaegi (m. 1978; div. 1991) Eva Tudor-Jones (m. 2019)

Thomas August Darnell Browder (born August 12, 1950), known professionally as August Darnell and under the stage name Kid Creole, is an American musician, singer and songwriter. He co-founded Dr. Buzzard's Original Savannah Band and subsequently formed and led Kid Creole and the Coconuts.

== Early life and career ==
Darnell was born in The Bronx in 1950. His mother was from South Carolina and his father from Savannah, Georgia. As an adult, Thom Browder began going by his two middle names, August Darnell. Claims from some sources that he was born in Montreal in Canada, are erroneous; according to Darnell they stem from the fictitious back-story behind the Kid Creole character.

Growing up in the multicultural area of the Bronx, Darnell was exposed early on to all kinds of music. Darnell began his musical career in a band named The In-Laws with his half-brother, Stony Browder Jr., in 1965. The band disbanded so Darnell could pursue a career as an English teacher. He taught at Alverta B. Gray Schultz Middle School in Hempstead, New York after studying English and drama at Hofstra University. He later claimed that he established a musical career because he was a "frustrated actor".

In 1974, again with Stony Browder, he formed Dr. Buzzard's Original Savannah Band, becoming its lyricist and bass player. The band combined swing and Latin music with disco rhythms and had its biggest hit in 1976 with "Cherchez La Femme". Their self-titled debut release was a Top 40-charting album which was certified gold and was nominated for a Grammy.

== Kid Creole ==
In 1979, Darnell left Dr. Buzzard's Original Savannah Band. He joined the band Machine, and co-wrote their best known song "There But for the Grace of God Go I". He also began producing for other artists, such as Don Armando's Second Avenue Rhumba Band and Gichy Dan's Beachwood No.9, before adopting the name Kid Creole (adapted from the Elvis Presley film King Creole) in 1980. Darnell described the persona of Kid Creole as "a flamboyant, devil-may-care bon vivant".

With his band and backing singers (including Darnell's then-wife, Adriana Kaegi), collectively known as Kid Creole and the Coconuts, he established an exuberant musical style drawing on such influences as big bands, notably that of Cab Calloway, salsa, jazz, pop music and disco. Darnell wrote the lyrics, which "satirised the high life at a time when America was ravaged by recession". The group released five albums, Off the Coast of Me (1980), Fresh Fruit in Foreign Places (1981), Tropical Gangsters (1982), Doppelganger (1983) and In Praise of Older Women...and Other Crimes (1985), that became especially popular and successful in Europe. Darnell also worked as a producer with acts on ZE Records. However, the band was much less successful in the U.S., and was eventually dropped by Sony.

In 1983, Darnell formed a new swing big band, Elbow Bones and the Racketeers, and gained the hit "A Night in New York".

== Later life ==
Kid Creole appeared in the movie " Against All Odds", starring Jeff Bridges and James Woods. He played himself and was singing in James Woods ' character's bar. Darnell moved to England in the 1980s, and later lived in Denmark, Sweden, and Maui, and occasionally tours Kid Creole and the Coconuts with his European band. One of Darnell's daughters, Savanna, appeared as a contestant on the 2018 series of Love Island, while his son Dario 'Youngr' Darnell appeared as the opening act on the second episode of Simon Cowell's new music competition for ITV called Walk the Line (13 December 2021). Another daughter, Ilselena, is a member of the British-Spanish girl group, MISSU. In 2019 Darnell married his girlfriend of 10 years, Eva Tudor-Jones in Maui. Eva has been a big part of the band's empire for 23 years, starting off as Mama Coconut in 1997 to now managing the band. Darnell and Eva have a daughter, born in Maui.
