= Sanctuary (disambiguation) =

A sanctuary is a place of safety.

Sanctuary or The Sanctuary or Sanctuaries may also refer to:

== Places ==
- Sanctuary, Saskatchewan, Canada
- Sanctuary, Texas, US
- Sanctuary, Shkodër, a church-mosque building and Cultural Monument of Albania
- The Sanctuary, a Neolithic archaeological site in Wiltshire, England
- The Sanctuary (Derby), a local nature reserve in Derby, England
- The Sanctuary (Seattle), townhouse and former church building
- The Sanctuary, the former St. Michael the Archangel Church (Cincinnati, Ohio)

== Fictional settings ==
- Sanctuary, a fictional Sussex village in Margery Allingham's 1931 novel Look to the Lady
- Sanctuary, a fictional location in Saint Seiya
- Sanctuary, the setting of the Diablo series
- Sanctuary, the city setting of the Thieves' World shared universe series
- Sanctuary, a fictional community in The Walking Dead
- Sanctuary Fortress, a region in Metroid Prime 2: Echoes
- Sanctuary, a base of operation of the Marvel Comics character Thanos
  - Sanctuary (Marvel Cinematic Universe), an asteroid field where Thanos resides in the Marvel Cinematic Universe
  - Sanctuary II (Marvel Cinematic Universe), Thanos' large warship in the Marvel Cinematic Universe
- Sanctuary, a fictional location in the novel Logan's Run

== Literature ==
- Sanctuary (Angel novel) (2003)
- Sanctuary (Faulkner novel), a 1931 William Faulkner novel
- Sanctuary (Lackey novel), a 2005 novel in The Dragon Jousters tetralogy by Mercedes Lackey
- Sanctuary (manga), a 1990 manga by Sho Fumimura
- Sanctuary (McIntee novel) (1995)
- Sanctuary (play), a 1994 play by David Williamson
- Sanctuary, a Dragonlance novel by Paul B. Thompson and Tonya C. Cook
- Sanctuary, a magazine published by the Massachusetts Audubon Society
- "Sanctuary", a 1979 story by Agatha Christie, published in Miss Marple's Final Cases and Two Other Stories
- "Sanctuary", a 2006 story by Michael A. Burstein

== Film ==
- Sanctuary (1933 film), a Mexican drama
- Sanctuary (1961 film), a drama starring Lee Remick
- Sanctuary (2001 film), an American film
- Sanctuary (2006 film), a documentary about Lisa Gerrard
- Sanctuary (2009 film), a re-mixable science fiction film
- Sanctuary, a 2012 Irish film co-starring Anne-Marie Duff
- Sanctuary (2015 film), a German film
- Sanctuary (2022 film), an American film

== Television ==
=== Series ===
- Sanctuary (Canadian TV series), a 2008–11 Canadian science fiction-fantasy series
- Sanctuary, a 2019 Swedish TV series starring Josefin Asplund
- Sanctuary (Japanese TV series), a 2023 sports drama
- Sanctuary: A Witch's Tale, a 2024 American supernatural drama

=== Episodes ===
- "Sanctuary" (Angel), 2000
- "Sanctuary" (Chancer), 1990
- "Sanctuary" (Falling Skies), 2011
- "Sanctuary" (Grey's Anatomy), 2010
- "Sanctuary" (The Incredible Hulk), 1981
- "Sanctuary" (Law & Order), 1994
- "Sanctuary" (Murder in Suburbia), 2004
- "Sanctuary" (Sleepy Hollow), 2013
- "Sanctuary!", a 2015 episode of SpongeBob SquarePants
- "Sanctuary" (Star Trek: Deep Space Nine), 1993
- "Sanctuary" (Stargate Atlantis), 2005
- "Sanctuary" (The Twilight Zone), 2002
- "Chapter 4: Sanctuary", a 2019 episode of The Mandalorian
- "The Sanctuary" (Danger Man), 1960
- "Sanctuary" (The Orville), 2019

== Music ==
=== General ===
- Sanctuary Records, a British record label
- The Sanctuary (recording studio), a recording studio in Battersea, London, England
- The Sanctuary, a disco music nightclub in 1970's New York starring Francis Grasso
- Sanctuary (band), a heavy metal band from Seattle, Washington
- Sanctuary (tour), a concert tour by Within Temptation
- Sanctuary Music Arena, a former dance venue in Milton Keynes, England
- The Sanctuary, former name of the Digbeth Institute music venue in Birmingham, England

=== Albums ===
- Sanctuary (The J. Geils Band album), 1978
- Sanctuary (New Musik album), 1981
- Sanctuary (The Passions album), 1982
- Sanctuary (Twila Paris album), 1991
- Sanctuary (Dave Douglas album), 1997
- Sanctuary (Charlie Musselwhite album), 2004
- Sanctuary (Simon Webbe album), 2005
- Sanctuary (Irish charity album), 2008
- Sanctuary (Evanescence album), 2026
- Sanctuary, an album by Kanon

=== EPs ===
- Sanctuary (Lovelyz EP), 2018
- Sanctuary (Aly & AJ EP), 2019

=== Songs ===
- "Sanctuary" (Iron Maiden song), 1980
- "Sanctuary" (Utada song), 2005
- "Sanctuary" (Nami Tamaki song), 2006
- "Sanctuary" (Gabriella Cilmi song), 2008
- "Sanctuary" (Gareth Emery song), 2010
- "Sanctuary" (Joji song), 2019
- "Sanctuary", a song by Wayne Shorter on Miles Davis album Bitches Brew, 1970
- "Sanctuary", a song by New Musik from From A to B, 1980
- "Sanctuary", a song by Madonna from Bedtime Stories, 1994
- "Sanctuary", a song by Delta Goodrem from Mistaken Identity, 2004
- "Sanctuary", a song by B'z from The Circle, 2005
- "Sanctuary", a song by Cavalera Conspiracy from Inflikted, 2008
- "Sanctuary", a song by Korn from The Path of Totality, 2011
- "Sanctuary", a song by Markus Feehily from Fire, 2015
- "Sanctuary", a song by Aly & AJ from Sanctuary, 2019
- "Sanctuary", a song by Brett Kissel from The Compass Project, 2023
- "Sanctuary", a song by Dion DiMucci, 1971
- "Sanctuary", a song by Welshly Arms, 2018
- "The Sanctuary", a song by Darling Violetta on the soundtrack for Angel: Live Fast, Die Never

== Other uses ==
- Sanctuary (sculpture), a wooden sculpture by Martin Puryear
- USS Sanctuary (AH-17), a 1944 US Navy hospital ship
- The Sanctuary (community), a 1920s utopian community in England
- Animal sanctuary, a type of protected natural habitat
- Heavenly sanctuary, a Seventh-day Adventist doctrine
- Sanctuary city, a city that does not enforce immigration laws
- Sanctuary Housing, a UK housing association
- Sanctuary (architecture), an area in a church
- Sanctuary (painting), an 1867 painting by Richard Burchett

== See also ==
- Sanctuary Asia, an environmental Indian magazine
- Sanctuary movement, an effort by U.S. churches to shelter Central American refugees during the 1980s
- Sanctuary Pictures, an Australian film production company
- Santuario (disambiguation)
