= Sanctuary (New Musik album) =

Compilation album by New Musik
- Released: 1981
- Recorded: 1979–1981
- Genre: New wave, synthpop
- Label: Epic
- Producer: Tony Mansfield

Professional ratings
Review scores
Source	Rating
Allmusic	2/5 stars

Sanctuary is the only compilation from new wave/synthpop band New Musik, released on Epic Records on May 1, 1981, although only in the United States. It compiles tracks from the first two albums, From A to B and Anywhere.

"They All Run After The Carving Knife" was edited down to 4:54 from its original 5:52 running length on Anywhere.

== Track list ==
=== A side ===
1. "They All Run after the Carving Knife" 4:54
2. "Areas" 4:10
3. "Churches" 4:53
4. "Sanctuary" 4:12
5. "Science" 3:19
6. "Division" 4:20

=== B side ===
1. "Luxury" 3:48
2. "Straight Lines" 5:12
3. "This World of Water" 3:37
4. "Dead Fish (Don't Swim Home)" 5:24
5. "While You Wait" 5:05
6. "Back To Room One" 4:15
