= Good Fortune (soundtrack) =

Good Fortune (Original Motion Picture Soundtrack)

Film score by Carter Burwell
- Released: October 17, 2025
- Recorded: 2024–2025
- Studios: Abbey Road Studios, London
- Genre: Film score
- Length: 27:49
- Label: Lakeshore
- Producer: Carter Burwell

Carter Burwell chronology
Honey Don't! (2025)	Good Fortune (2025)	Wild Horse Nine (2026)

Good Fortune (Original Motion Picture Soundtrack) is the film score to the 2025 film Good Fortune directed by Aziz Ansari, in his feature directorial debut, who also stars alongside Seth Rogen, Keke Palmer, Sandra Oh and Keanu Reeves. The score is composed by Carter Burwell and was recorded at the Abbey Road Studios in London. The album was released through Lakeshore Records on October 17, 2025.

== Development ==
By August 2024, Carter Burwell was hired to compose the film score. According to Ansari, director Spike Jonze who was a regular collaborator of Burwell, recommended him to compose the score. Ansari reached to Burwell when the film's production took a hiatus for few months due to Reeves' injury; he compiled a rough cut of the film with the footages they shot and discussed ideas regarding the score, debating on "how ironic, sardonic or sincere the score should be" while also refraining Burwell from telling the audience too much with music.

For Gabriel's character, Burwell decided on the use of choir as Gabriel being a "somewhat silly angel" and the gravitas of the choir played the reality of the angelic world while also making a gag on Gabriel's incompetence. The scenes which were played ironically, Burwell used vintage keyboards which produced sounds that were slightly off and blended it with synthesizers. He also used upright bass played in the climatic scenes by Chris Hill.

However, Burwell debated with Ansari on the non-ironic scenes in the climatic moments that played with little dialogues and more music. While the last scene served as a happy ending, Burwell decided to use strings and woodwinds, but Ansari felt it to be cheating. Hence, Burwell tried to make it smaller and less orchestral, before they reinstated with the original plan so that it provided a warmth which was hopefully earned.

== Track listing ==
No.	Title	Length
1.	"Wings Over LA"	1:44
2.	"Keep Your Dreams Alive"	1:04
3.	"A Special Angel"	1:39
4.	"More Meaningful Duties"	0:59
5.	"Jeff's Photo Wall"	0:43
6.	"And Here We Are"	0:41
7.	"Faltered States"	0:51
8.	"Visions of the Hope Your Life Promises"	2:31
9.	"Not All It's Cracked Up to Be"	2:23
10.	"You're Going to Make Me Go Back?"	1:13
11.	"I Love Dancing, I Love Tacos, and I Love You"	2:27
12.	"What Did You Do to Me?"	0:34
13.	"Gabriel Is Let Go"	0:46
14.	"Delivery for Arj"	1:32
15.	"Arj Drives and Texts and Crashes"	0:33
16.	"The Union Vote"	0:48
17.	"We Can Get My Watches"	0:56
18.	"Stealing Pretty Baby"	1:43
19.	"A Life Worth Living"	4:44
Total length:		27:49

== Reception ==
Robert Daniels of Screen International wrote "Carter Burwell's kooky score tastefully softens the film's harder edges while adding greater levity to the wacky energy". Michael Rechtshaffen of The Hollywood Reporter and Peter Debruge of Variety called the score as "engaging" and "fun-filled". Kevin Reardon of Trill Magazine wrote "Carter Burwell's whimsical and comforting score gives the film a perfect "vibe"". Clarisse Loughrey of The Independent wrote "Carter Burwell's score is as breezy as can be". Troy Ribeiro of The Free Press Journal wrote "Carter Burwell's score adds breezy, ironic cheer to scenes of quiet despair, a witty but weary touch".

== Additional music ==
The following songs are featured in the film, but not in the soundtrack:

- "The New Pollution" – Beck
- "Streets of Your Town" – The Go-Betweens
- "Brighter Days" – Cajmere feat. Dajae
- "It's My Life" – De Posse
- "Good Life" – Inner City
- "The Whistle Song" – Frankie Knuckles and Eric Kupper
- "Do Ya Wanna Funk" – Patrick Cowley and Sylvester
- "Push It" – Salt-N-Pepa
- "Everybody's Happy Nowadays" – Buzzcocks
- "La Canalla" – El Super Show De Los Vasquez
- "Groove Is in the Heart" – Deee-Lite
- "Madame Hollywood" – Felix Da Housecat
- "Cccan't You See" – Vicious Pink
- "Quand la ville dort" – Niagara
- "Boys (Summertime Love)" – Sabrina Salerno
- "El Chico del Apartamento 512" – Selena
- "La Sabrosita" – Digital Charanga
- "Si mañana" – Celso Piña
- "Send Me an Angel" – Real Life
- "Praise You" – Fatboy Slim (featured in the first trailer)

== Personnel ==
Credits adapted from Film Music Reporter:

- Music composer, producer, conductor and orchestrator: Carter Burwell
- Choir vocals: Vocals Unlimited
- Choirmaster: Sebastian Charlesworth
- Recorded and mixed by: Simon Rhodes
- Recordist: Christopher Parker
- Music editor: Neil Stemp
- Music consultants: Zach Cowie, Gabe Hilfer
- Orchestra and choir contractor: Amy Ewen for Isobel Griffiths
- Vocal contractor: Tom Pearce
- Music clearance and licensing: Matt Lilley and Ann-Marie Verdi, MCL Music Services, Inc.
- Music preparation: Jill Streater, Global Music Service
- Musical assistance: Dean Parker
