= So in Love with You =

So in Love with You may refer to:

- So in Love with You (Texas song)
- So in Love with You (Duke song)
