= Can't You See =

Can't You See may refer to:

- "Can't You See" (The Marshall Tucker Band song), 1973
- "Cccan't You See", a song by Vicious Pink, 1984
- "Can't You See", a song by Tiffany from Dreams Never Die, 1993
- "Can't You See" (Total song), 1995
- "Can’t You See", a song by Why Don't We from 8 Letters, 2018
- "Can't You See", a song by Fidlar from Almost Free, 2019
