= Living by Numbers =

Single by New Musik

from the album From A to B
- B-side: "Sad Films"
- Released: 30 November 1979 (UK); 1980 (Netherlands)
- Genre: Synth-pop
- Label: GTO Records
- Songwriter: Tony Mansfield

New Musik singles chronology
"Straight Lines" (1979)	"Living by Numbers" (1979)	"This World of Water" (1980)

"Living by Numbers" is a song by the English synthpop group New Musik. It was the band's biggest hit worldwide, peaking at No. 13 in January 1980 in the UK and No. 12 in Ireland. The song appeared on the band's debut album, From A to B. It was used, with reworked lyrics, for a Casio advert. The B-side of the single was "Sad Films".

== Chart history ==
Chart (1980)	Peak position
Australia (Kent Music Report)	55
UK Singles Chart	13
Irish Singles Chart	12
