= Something So Right =

Something So Right may refer to:

- Something So Right (TV series), an American television situation comedy
- "Something So Right" (song), 1973 song by Paul Simon
- Something So Right (album), 1976 album by Gwen McCrae
- Something So Right (film), 1982 television film starring Rick Schroeder, directed by Lou Antonio
- "Something So Right", 2008 song from Bratz Girlz Really Rock
- Something So Right, a 1986 novel by Emilie Richards

== See also ==
- "Something So Wrong", song by Silent Running from Deep
