= Vicious Pink (album) =

Studio album by Vicious Pink
- Released: 1986
- Genre: Synth-pop; new wave
- Label: Capitol
- Producer: Tony Mansfield (tracks 1–5 and 7–9); Gary Moberly (track 6)

Vicious Pink chronology
Vicious Pink (1986)	West View (2022)

Vicious Pink is the first studio album by the English synth-pop duo Vicious Pink, released in 1986 by Capitol Records. The singles, "Cccan't You See" and "Fetish"/"Spooky", reached No. 67 and No. 87 on the UK singles chart, respectively.

== Track listing ==
1. "Cccan't You See" (Brian Moss, Josephine Warden) – 3:25
2. "Spooky" (Mike Shapiro, Harry Middlebrooks Jr., James Cobb, Buddy Buie) – 3:17
3. "The Spaceship is Over There" (Moss, Warden) – 4:19
4. "Blue" (Love Mix) (Moss, Warden) – 3:17
5. "Fetish" (Moss, Warden) – 3:18
6. "Take Me Now" (John David) – 3:58
7. "Always Hoping" (Moss, Warden) – 3:54
8. "8:15 to Nowhere" / "Great Balls of Fire" (Otis Blackwell, Jack Hammer, Moss) – 4:51
9. "Cccan't You See" (Exxx-tended Re-Mixxx) (Moss, Warden) – 6:00
