= Walk on Fire =

Walk on Fire may refer to:

- Walk on Fire (band), a British melodic rock band
- Walk on Fire (album), a 1987 album by Silent Running
- Walk on Fire (film), a 1988 Hong Kong action film
- Walk on Fire, a 1999 album by Royal Crown Revue
