= Nick Straker Band =

English music group

- Origin: London, England
- Genres: Post-disco, new wave, synthpop, jazz-funk fusion
- Years active: 1979–1987
- Labels: Prelude Records (US); Pinnacle Records (UK); Decca Records (Germany)
- Past members: Nick Straker; Tony Mansfield; David McShera; Pete Hammond; Phil Towner; Tony Hibbert

The Nick Straker Band were an English pop music group from London, England, led by musician and vocalist Nick Straker, who had earlier gained experience by playing in Dennis Bovell's Matumbi, a dub and roots reggae band. Several members of the band were also in New Musik, and the band's line-up consisted of Straker along with Tony Mansfield, Tony Hibbert, David McShera, Pete Hammond and Phil Towner. Their song "A Walk in the Park" (released June 1979 Pinnacle label) peaked at No. 20 on the UK Singles Chart in 1980, having previously been a substantial hit in Continental Europe in 1979. Their most successful song in the US was "A Little Bit of Jazz", which spent one week at No. 1 on the Hot Dance Music/Club Play Chart in 1981.

== Discography ==
=== Albums ===
Title	Year	Information
Future's Above My Head (Germany only)	1979	Producer: Nick Bailey, Jeremy Paul
A Walk in the Park (UK only)	1980	Producer: Nick Bailey, Paul Lynton, Jeremy Paul
The Nick Straker Band (U.S. only)	1981	Producer: Nick Straker Band
Nick Straker	1983	Producer: Nick Bailey
The Best of Nick Straker: A Walk in the Park	1993	Producer: Various

=== Singles ===
Year	Title	Peak chart positions					
Year	Title	AUT	CHE	GER	UK	US Dance	US R&B
1979	"A Walk in the Park"	7	5	3	20	—	—
1980	"Don't Come Back"	—	—	—	—	—	—
1980	"Leaving on the Midnight Train"	—	—	—	61	—	—
1980	"A Little Bit of Jazz" / "The Last Goodbye"	—	—	—	—	1	35
1981	"Like Dust"	—	—	—	—	—	—
1982	"Way of Life"	—	—	—	—	—	—
1982	"Straight Ahead"	—	—	—	—	12	—
1983	"You Know I Like It"	—	—	—	—	—	—
1983	"Against the Wall"	—	—	—	—	—	—
1984	"Turn Me Down"	—	—	—	—	—	—
1984	"Must You Dance"	—	—	—	—	—	—
1984	"It Only Takes a Minute"	—	—	—	—	—	—
1987	"A Walk in the Park '87 (PWL Mix)"	—	—	—	82	—	—
"—" denotes releases that did not chart or were not released in that territory.

== See also ==
- List of Billboard number-one dance club songs
- List of artists who reached number one on the U.S. Dance Club Songs chart
