= Silent Running (band) =

Irish rock band

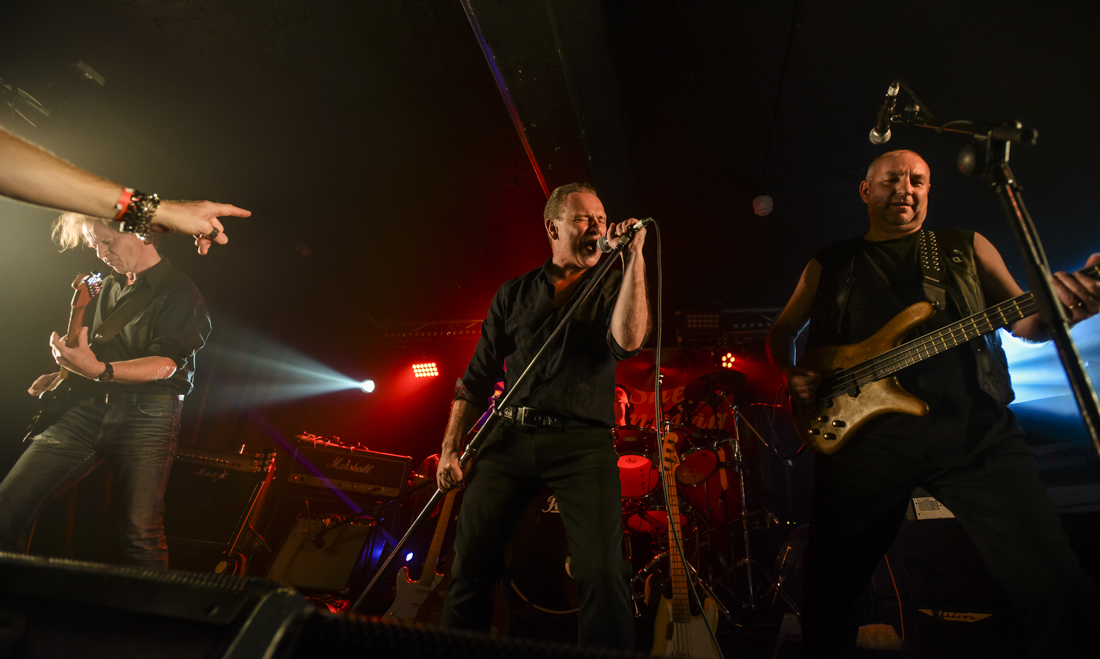
- Silent Running performing in 2019.

Background information
- Origin: Belfast, Northern Ireland, United Kingdom
- Genres: New wave; punk rock; alternative rock
- Years active: 1982–1990; 2019–present
- Labels: Parlophone; Atlantic Records
- Members: Peter Gamble; Tony Scott; Richard Collett; Gary Kirby
- Past members: George Beavis; Alex White; Ian Gault; Paul Rocks
- Website: www.silentrunning.band

Silent Running are a Northern Irish rock band, who emerged from the Belfast punk rock scene and were originally called The Setz, before changing musical direction in 1982. The original band members were Richard Collett (bass, born 31 March 1960), Peter Gamble (vocals, born 24 November 1960), Tony Scott (guitars) and Ian Gault (drums). Prior to signing to EMI, the band recruited George Beavis on keyboards.

== Career ==
The first single recorded, "All the King's Men"/"When the 12th of Never Comes", was a 300-copy promotional only release which led to a session for BBC Radio 1 following interest from Peter Powell.

Shortly afterwards, the band signed with EMI Records and released the single "When the 12th of Never Comes".

The band recorded tracks such as "Speed of Life" for the proposed first album, although Beavis was subsequently dismissed and replaced with Alex White. The resulting album was Shades of Liberty which received a five star review in Melody Maker headlined "Silent Classic". Singles such as "Young Hearts" and "Sticks and Stones" both failed to reach the top 40 of the UK Singles Chart, and the band never achieved the desired breakthrough.

== Shades of Liberty ==
Shades of Liberty Album Cover

=== Background ===
Prior to signing to EMI, Silent Running recruited George Beavis on keyboards and together the band recorded tracks such as "Speed of Life" for their proposed first album. However, Beavis was subsequently dismissed and replaced with Alex White. The line-up then recorded Shades of Liberty. Three singles were released from the album: "Emotional Warfare", "Young Hearts", and "Sticks and Stones". Despite attempts to gain commercial success, the band never achieved the desired breakthrough. "Young Hearts" was the only single to make a chart appearance in the UK, where it reached No. 92. Shades of Liberty failed to chart. Both "Young Hearts" and "Sticks and Stones" were released within the UK and Europe only, while "Emotional Warfare" was released in America and Europe.

Shades of Liberty was the band's only album release for EMI. A second album for EMI was planned and the single "No Faith is Blind" preceded it in 1985. However, the limited success of the single resulted in the label cancelling the second album and dropping the band. They would sign to Atlantic Records after, where they would record two albums.

=== Recording ===
The album was recorded at both The Manor and Windmill Lane Studios in Dublin, while it was mixed at The Manor and Air Studios. It was recorded during January–February 1984.

=== Release ===
The album was released by EMI Records in the UK, Europe and North America. In America and Canada, the album was titled Emotional Warfare, after the leading (and only American) single. The release featured slightly different front artwork, with a black background replacing the white of the European sleeve. The back artwork on the European and North America editions are completely different. The album has not seen a CD release, except an unofficial one by the Lost 80s Record Company in 2013.

=== Promotion ===
A music video was filmed to promote the "Emotional Warfare" and "Young Hearts" singles. In 1984, the band appeared on UK TV show The Tube, where they performed "Emotional Warfare" and "Sticks and Stones". On the German TV show Musik Convoy, the band performed "Young Hearts".

=== Track listing ===
No.	Title	Writer(s)	Length
1.	"Home is Where the Heart Is"	Richard Collett, Peter Gamble	3:58
2.	"Emotional Warfare"	Tony Scott, Ian Gault, Alex White, Collett, Gamble	5:08
3.	"One in a Million Day"	Collett, Gamble, Scott	3:50
4.	"Sticks and Stones"	Scott, Gault, White, Collett, Gamble	4:08
5.	"That's Life (In the Real World)"	Scott, Gault, White, Collett, Gamble	5:52
6.	"Shades of Liberty"	Collett, Gamble, Gault, Scott	4:20
7.	"Crimson Days"	Gamble, Gault, Scott	3:58
8.	"Young Hearts"	Collett, Gamble, Gault, Scott	3:38
9.	"Go for the Heart"	Gamble	5:50

=== Critical reception ===
Professional ratings
Review scores
Source	Rating
AllMusic	2/5 stars
Billboard	favorable
Melody Maker	5/5 stars
Record Mirror	3.5/5 stars

Upon release, the album received a five out of five star review in the Melody Maker magazine headlined "Silent Classic". In the American magazine Billboard, Shades of Liberty was included under the 'Recommended' section of the 'Pop' albums section. The magazine described the album as "U2-style wall of sound to a disco beat."

=== Chart performance ===
==== Singles ====
Young Hearts

Chart (1984)	Peak position
UK Singles Chart	92

=== Personnel ===
- Peter Gamble – vocals
- Tony Scott – guitar
- Alex White – keyboards
- Richard Collett – bass
- Ian Gault – drums

==== Additional personnel ====
- Peter Walsh – producer, engineer
- Jif – assistant engineer at Air
- Steve Chase – assistant engineer at The Manor
- Kevin Killen – assistant engineer at Windmill Lane
- Design RX – The Creative Department Ltd. – sleeve artwork
- Ursula Steiger – photography

=== EMI ===
The second album on EMI was prefaced with the release of the double A-side single "No Faith Is Blind"/"Business as Usual". Despite airplay and appearances on television shows across the musical spectrum (including Cheggers Plays Pop), the single only charted at No. 85 in the UK resulting in the band being dropped by EMI. This led to the situation of their second album on EMI getting cancelled before its designated release date.

In a major coup, the band were subsequently picked up by Atlantic Records, becoming the first Irish act to join the roster of this American record label.

White left in 1985 to work with Joan Armatrading, resulting in the band relying on session musicians such as Adrian Lee (Mike + The Mechanics), Clive Gates (New Musik) and Ian Curnow (Talk Talk; he was not really a stranger to the band, since he had already played keyboards on their 1983 debut single) to record the next two albums (Walk on Fire and Deep).

== Walk on Fire ==
Walk on Fire Album Cover

=== Background ===
After the commercial failure of the band's 1984 debut album Shades of Liberty and its three singles, the band were to record their second album for EMI Records. However, the 1985 single "No Faith is Blind" failed to become a commercial success. Despite massive airplay and appearances on television shows across the musical spectrum (including 'Cheggar's Plays Pop') the single resulted in the band being dropped by EMI.

In a major coup the band were picked up by Atlantic Records, becoming the first British or Irish act to join the roster of this legendary American record label.

A total of two singles were released from the album; "Sanctuary" and "Heartland", which both failed to make enough impact to chart, causing the band to not make the elusive breakthrough that was hoped.

"Sanctuary" was released in both the UK and America. The artwork for the single used the main artwork for the album. "Heartland" was released during 1988 in the UK only although it was also released as an American promotional single. The single featured non-related artwork to the album.

=== Recording ===
The album was produced and engineered by British-Canadian producer Terry Brown, although two tracks, "Walk on Fire" and "Till Tomorrow Comes", were produced by Andy Richards and engineered by Tony Phillips. All tracks are original, where the music was written by all four members of the band, with the lyrics being written solely by vocalist Peter Gamble.

Keyboardist Alex White left in 1985 to work with Joan Armatrading, resulting in the band relying on session musicians such as Ian Curnow (Talk Talk) to record keyboards on the album.

=== Release ===
Walk on Fire was released by Atlantic Records in North America, Europe and Australia. The album was made available on all streaming platforms by Warner Music on 23 July 2021.

=== Promotion ===
A music video was created for the single "Sanctuary".

A European mini-poster advertisement for the album was issued for magazines.

==== Track listing ====
No.	Title	Writer(s)	Length
1.	"Sanctuary"	Richard Collett, Ian Gault, Peter Gamble, Tony Scott	5:34
2.	"Heartland"	Richard Collett, Ian Gault, Peter Gamble, Tony Scott	4:42
3.	"The Hunger"	Richard Collett, Ian Gault, Peter Gamble, Tony Scott	5:05
4.	"Heartbreak City"	Richard Collett, Ian Gault, Peter Gamble, Tony Scott	4:18
5.	"Walk on Fire"	Richard Collett, Ian Gault, Peter Gamble, Tony Scott	3:50
6.	"Winds of War"	Richard Collett, Ian Gault, Peter Gamble, Tony Scott	4:21
7.	"Under Your Skin"	Richard Collett, Ian Gault, Peter Gamble, Tony Scott	3:39
8.	"Till Tomorrow Comes"	Richard Collett, Ian Gault, Peter Gamble, Tony Scott	3:54

=== Critical reception ===
Following the commercial failure of the album, the band would work on their next album for Atlantic Records, the 1989 album Deep.

Professional ratings
Review scores
Source	Rating
AllMusic	3/5 stars

=== Personnel ===
- Peter Gamble – vocals, lyrics
- Tony Scott – guitar
- Richard Collett – bass
- Ian Gault – drums, drum programming

==== Additional personnel ====
- Terry Brown – Producer, Engineer
- Andy Richards – Producer on "Walk on Fire" and "Till Tomorrow Comes", Keyboards
- Tony Phillips – Engineer on "Walk on Fire" and "Till Tomorrow Comes"
- James Reynolds – Assistant Engineer
- Ren Swan – Assistant Engineer
- Trevor Hallesy – Engineer
- Ian Curnow – Keyboards
- Clive Griffin, Helena Spriggs, Linda Taylor, Shirley Lewis, Tessa Niles – Backing Vocals

== Deep ==
Deep Album Cover (1989)

=== Background ===
Deep was the band's second album for Atlantic Records, and the third studio album, released in 1989.

With the release of Deep, the band toured extensively but disbanded shortly after, citing a lack of record company support.

Both "Deep in the Heart of Nowhere" and "Local Hero" were released as promotional CD singles in the US.

=== Recording ===
The first four tracks of the album were produced by the band themselves with Frankie LaRocka and Peter Denenberg, who both engineered the album. The rest of the tracks were produced by John Eden, whilst LaRocka and Deneberg remixed the tracks produced by Eden. The album was LaRocka's first attempt at production work, where he also played drums on part of the album. Originally, LaRocka had signed the band while working in the A&R department at Atlantic Records.

Drummer Ian Gault departed the band after the initial recording of Deep in 1988 and was therefore replaced by Gary Kirby. Around the same time, Paul Rocks joined the band on keyboards, and the band finished recording the Deep album in New York.

Prior to Paul Rocks joining, the previous keyboardist Alex White had left the group back in 1985 to work with Joan Armatrading, resulting in the band relying on session musicians such as Adrian Lee (Mike + The Mechanics) and Clive Gates (New Music and Ian Curnow, Talk Talk.

All tracks are original, where the music was written by all three main members of the band; vocalist Peter Gamble, bassist Richard Collett and guitarist Tony Scott, discounting new members Kirby and Rocks, with the lyrics being written solely by vocalist Peter Gamble. Some tracks featured a writing credit to Gault, as they were completed before he left the group.

=== Release ===
Deep was released by Atlantic Records in the United States and Europe. The album was made available on all streaming platforms by Warner Music on 23 July 2021.

==== Critical reception ====
Professional ratings
Review scores
Source	Rating
AllMusic	4/5 stars
Hi-Fi News & Record Review	A:1

Glorydaze Music wrote, "Earlier fans of the band would've turned away after their debut, as both Walk on Fire and Deep are quite some way removed from their original direction moulded in the style of Simple Minds and U2. On the other hand, AORsters and melodic rockers would've welcomed them with open arms."

=== Track listing ===
No.	Title	Writer(s)	Length
1.	"Deep in the Heart of Nowhere"	Peter Gamble, Richard Collett, Tony Scott	4:13
2.	"Everything Your Heart Desires"	Gamble, Collett, Scott	4:06
3.	"Angel of Mercy"	Gamble, Collett, Scott	4:17
4.	"Strength of our Love"	Gamble, Collett, Scott, Ian Gault	4:35
5.	"When Will I Learn?"	Gamble, Collett, Scott, Gault	4:28
6.	"Flame of Love"	Gamble, Collett, Scott, Gault	4:54
7.	"Sunshine in the Rain"	Gamble, Collett, Scott, Gault	4:33
8.	"Local Hero"	Gamble, Collett, Scott, Gault	4:48
9.	"Deliverance"	Gamble, Collett, Scott, Gault	4:37
10.	"Something So Wrong"	Gamble, Collett, Scott, Gault	4:44

=== Personnel ===
- Peter Gamble – vocals, producer
- Tony Scott – guitar, producer
- Richard Collett – bass, Producer
- Ian Gault – drums, drum Programming
- Gary Kirby – drums
- Paul Rocks – keyboards

==== Additional personnel ====
- John Eden – producer (tracks 5–10)
- Frankie LaRocka – producer, engineer, remixer, drums
- Peter Denenberg – producer, engineer, remixer
- Tom Leinbach – assistant engineer (tracks 1–4)
- Clive Gates – keyboards
- Adrian Lee – keyboards
- Joe Bonadio – percussion
- Steve Sidelnyk – percussion
- Adrian Baker, Amy Fradon, Carole Godden, Leslie Ritter – backing vocals

== Reunion ==
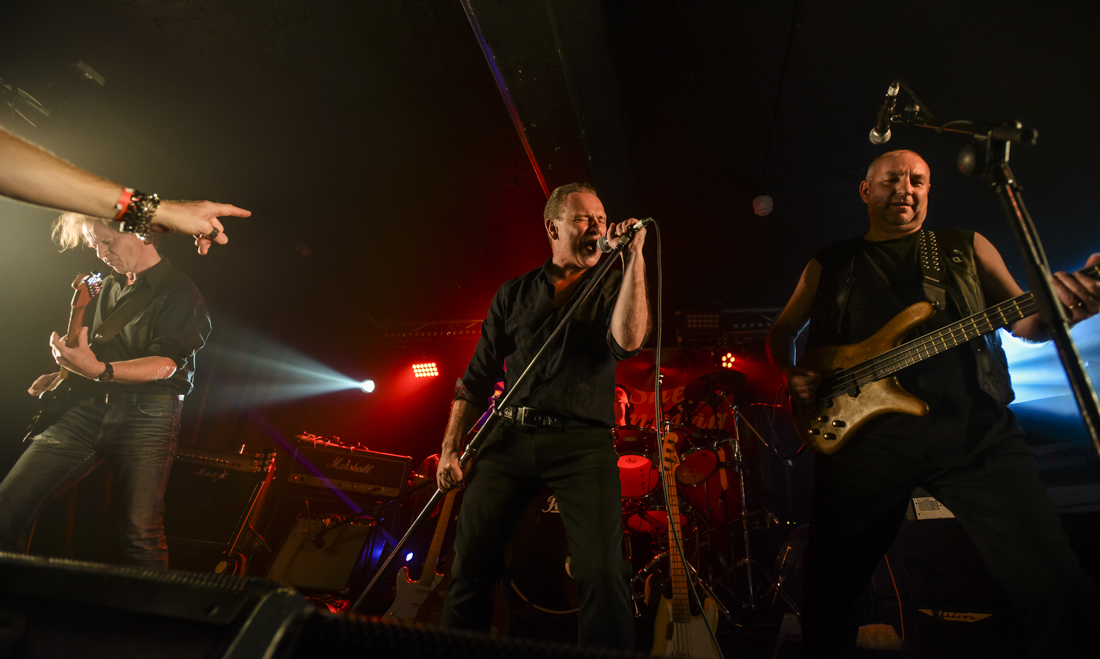
Silent Running performing in 2019

In January 2018, the band reunited for the first time in 20 years for a band member's wife's birthday event, augmented by Callum Collett on guitar.

In March 2019, Silent Running announced a return to the stage at Belfast venue 'Voodoo' promising songs from all three albums as well as "showcasing new material". They played to a sold-out crowd on 14 June 2019 with fans flying in from England and Scotland.

In August the same year, the band returned to the studio for the first time in 30 years to record a brand new track titled "Lost Boy". The song was released as a digital download in October 2019.

A much anticipated second concert on 15 November 2019 sold out, with more fans flying to Belfast from Edinburgh, Inverness, Glasgow, Milton Keynes and Leeds. That night the band played two new songs; "Right Time, Right Place" and "Shadowland". The show was filmed and is available to watch on the band's YouTube channel.

The band finally made it back onstage in Voodoo, Belfast on 29 April 2022 to a sell out crowd with Silent Running fans flying in from England, Scotland and Germany to hear them showcase the fourth album Follow the Light.

== Live in Voodoo, Belfast ==
Live in Voodoo, Belfast Album Cover

=== Recording ===
The album was recorded live in Voodoo, Belfast and engineered by Andy Coles.

The album includes live performances of songs from the band's first three albums 'Shades of Liberty', 'Walk on Fire' and 'Deep' plus the 2019 single 'Lost Boy' and a brand new song 'Shadowland'

=== Release ===
Silent Running Live in Voodoo, Belfast was released as a CD and digital download in November 2020.

A third concert, due to be played on 9 October 2020 was cancelled due to the COVID-19 pandemic and rescheduled for 29 April 2022 at Voodoo, Belfast.

=== Promotion ===
The show was filmed and is available to watch on the band's YouTube channel.

=== Track listing ===
No.	Title	Length
1.	"Deep in the Heart of Nowhere (live)"	5:05
2.	"Strength of Our Love (live)"	4:50
3.	"Sanctuary (live)"	5:16
4.	"Heartland (live)"	4:26
5.	"Emotional Warfare (live)"	5:38
6.	"Tonight This World Belongs To Me (live)"	5:08
7.	"Sunshine in the Rain (live)"	6:01
8.	"Lost Boy (live)"	5:13
9.	"Flame of Love (live)"	5:02
10.	"Local Hero (live)"	5:22
11.	"Shadowland (live)"	6:39
12.	"Young Hearts (live)"	5:38
13.	"No Faith Is Blind (live)"	5:24

=== Personnel ===
- Lead Vocals, Guitar – Peter Gamble
- Bass Guitar, Vocals – Richard Collett
- Guitar – Tony Scott (7)
- Drums, Vocals – Gary Kirby
- Keyboards, Vocals – Paul Rocks

==== Additional personnel ====
- Engineer – Andrew Coles
- Photography By – Bruno Tamiozzo

== Digital re-releases ==
On 27 July 2021 Warner Bros made Walk on Fire and Deep available for digital download on most streaming platforms. This was then followed by a remastered version of the first album, Shades of Liberty.

== Follow The Light ==
Follow The Light Album Cover

=== Background ===
Follow The Light, the band's fourth studio album, was released by Door Records as digital download and limited edition CD through Bandcamp on 1 April 2022, as well as all streaming platforms.

=== Release ===
Follow The Light was released by Door Records as digital download & limited edition CD through Bandcamp on 1 April 2022, as well all streaming platforms.

The album was put on general release by Door Records on 22 July 2022.

=== Promotion ===
Music videos were created & filmed for the singles "Lost Boy", "Live Right Now" and "Beyond Your Wildest Dreams".

Discussing the new album, Peter Gamble appeared on Robin Elliot's 'Tonight' program and was interviewed by Johnny Hero

=== "Darkest Hour" ===
The single "Darkest Hour" was released on 30 March 2022 as a digital download through Bandcamp in aid of the British Red Cross Ukraine Humanitarian Appeal with all profits from the download going to the Ukraine Humanitarian Appeal.

A video for "Darkest Hour" is available on the band's YouTube channel

=== Track listing ===
No.	Title	Writer(s)	Length
1.	"Live Right Now"	Peter Gamble	4:27
2.	"Darkest Hour"	Peter Gamble	5:44
3.	"Beyond Your Wildest Dreams"	Peter Gamble	4:58
4.	"Follow The Light"	Peter Gamble	4:50
5.	"Love is A Bloodsport"	Peter Gamble	3:35
6.	"Golden Days"	Peter Gamble	4:28
7.	"Swansong"	Peter Gamble	4:53
8.	"Shadowland"	Peter Gamble	5:50
9.	"Lost Boy"	Peter Gamble	4:49
10.	"Wildfire"	Peter Gamble	4:46
11.	"Tonight This World Belongs To Me"	Peter Gamble	5:04

=== Personnel ===
- Peter Gamble – vocals, acoustic guitar
- Tony Scott – guitar, backing vocals
- Richard Collett – bass guitar, backing vocals
- Gary Kirby – drums, drum programming, percussion, backing vocals
- Paul Rocks – Keyboards, acoustic guitar, backing vocals

==== Additional personnel ====
- Gary Aiken – Engineer

=== Critical reception ===
Powerplay Rock and Metal Magazine gave it 9/10 stating it was 'A Damned Good Album'.

The Beat Magazine – 'All eleven tracks shine with the band's renewed life'

Maximum Volume Music gave it 8.5/10 stating Follow The Light is a cracker and it felt like Silent Running have never been away.'

Redguitarmusic.com – 'Follow The Light' is an excellent record.

The Midlands Rocks – 'a career-defining album in the shape of Follow The Light.

Get Ready To Rock website – 'It's not often you can say that a rock album has heart and soul. This one does.'

Professional ratings
Review scores
Source	Rating
	9/10 stars
	8.5/10 stars
	3.5/5 stars

== NORTHSTAR ==
NORTHSTAR Album Cover

=== Background ===
NORTHSTAR, the band's fifth studio album, was released by Door Records as digital download and limited edition CD through Bandcamp on 5 September 2025, as well as all streaming platforms.

=== Release ===
NORTHSTAR was released by Door Records as digital download & limited edition CD through Bandcamp on 5 September 2025, as well all streaming platforms.

=== Promotion ===
A music video was created & filmed for the single "Hit and Run, "

=== "Hit and Run" ===
The single "Hit and Run" was released on 15 August 2025 as a digital download through Bandcamp.

A video for "Hit and Run" is available on the band's YouTube channel

=== Track listing ===
No.	Title	Writer(s)	Length
1.	"This Is My City Tonight"	Peter Gamble	4:42
2.	"Hit and Run"	Peter Gamble	5:40
3.	"You And Me Against The World"	Peter Gamble	3:59
4.	"State of Mind"	Peter Gamble	5:03
5.	"Shooting Star"	Peter Gamble	3:35
6.	"Seventh Wave"	Peter Gamble	4:43
7.	"Rose From A Stone"	Peter Gamble	5:13
8.	"Faith Healer"	Peter Gamble	4:16
9.	"Don't Look Down"	Peter Gamble	5:19
10.	"The Walking Wounded"	Peter Gamble	4:25

=== Personnel ===
- Peter Gamble – vocals, acoustic guitar
- Tony Scott – guitar, backing vocals
- Richard Collett – bass guitar, backing vocals
- Gary Kirby – drums, drum programming, percussion, backing vocals

==== Additional personnel ====
- Vic Bronzini-Fulton – Engineer
- David Williams - Keyboards and sequencing (except track 8 by Paul Rocks)

== Tours ==
Silent Running supported John Foxx in 1983, Simple Minds on their UK tour in early 1984, and also toured with Robert Palmer and Talk Talk. During September 1984, they performed live on the Channel 4 music show The Tube. The band toured the UK during late 1985 and played live on BBC Radio 1 for the Radiothon appeal at the Birmingham Powerhouse. Later in the 80's they would tour alongside Little Steven (E Street Band ) and Welsh rockers The Alarm. In August 2022 the band once again supported Simple Minds after 38 years at Custom House Square Belfast.

== Discography ==
=== Studio and live albums ===
- Shades of Liberty (1984; EMI)
- Walk on Fire (1987; Atlantic)
- Deep (1989; Atlantic)
- Live in Voodoo, Belfast (2020; Door Records)
- Follow the Light (2022; Door Records)
- NORTHSTAR (2025; Door Records)

=== Singles ===
- 1983 "When the 12th of Never Comes" – UK No. 83
- 1984 "Young Hearts" – UK No. 92
- 1984 "Sticks and Stones"
- 1985 "No Faith Is Blind" – UK No. 85
- 1987 "Sanctuary"
- 1988 "Heartland"
- 2019 "Lost Boy"
- 2020 "Live Right now"
- 2022 "Beyond Your Wildest Dreams"
- 2022 "Darkest Hour"
- 2023 "Walking Wounded"
- 2023 "Faith Healer"
- 2025 "Hit and Run"
