= National Badminton League =

Professional badminton league

- Sport: Badminton
- Founded: 2014
- Folded: 2017
- Country: United Kingdom

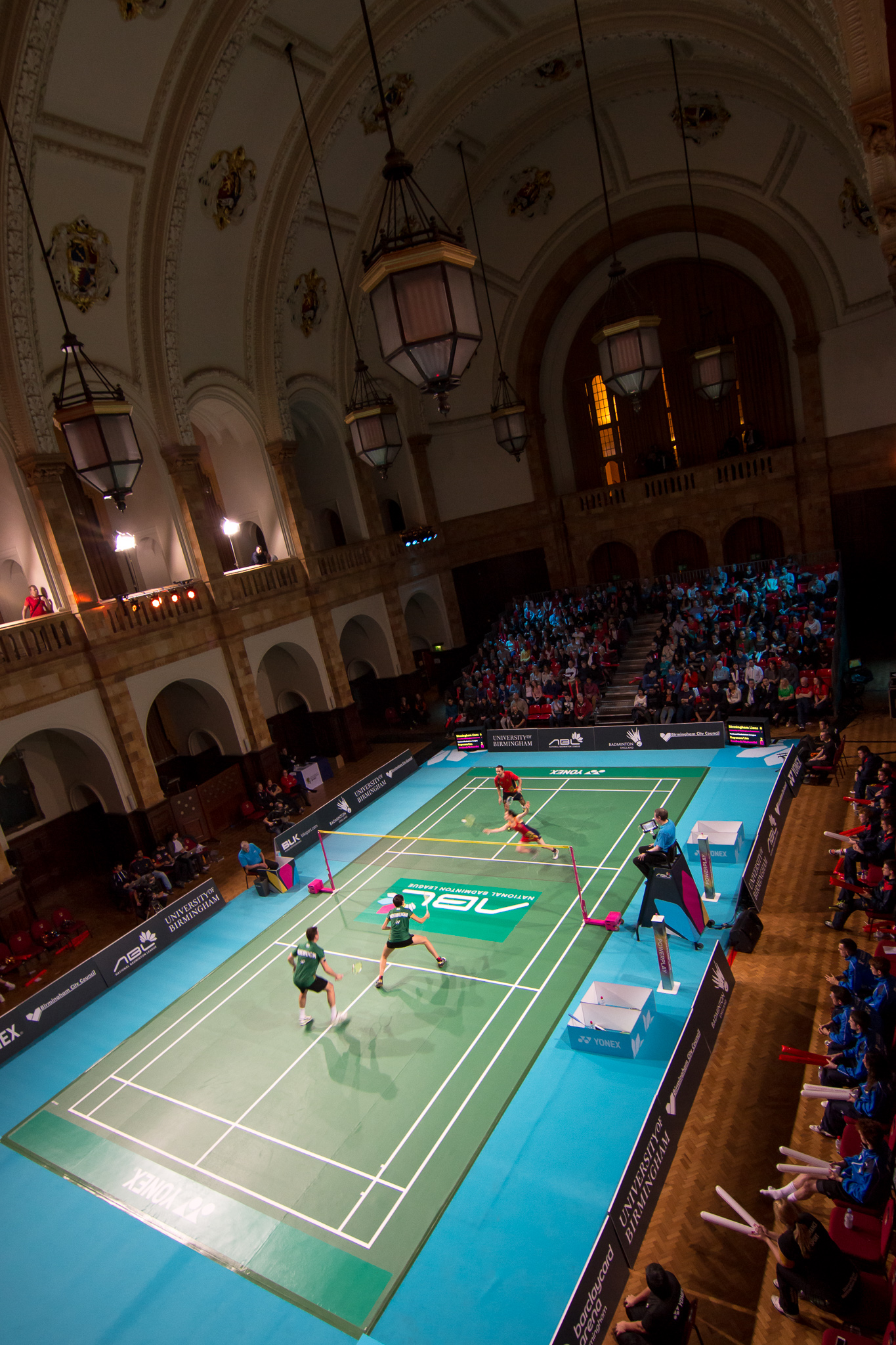
An NBL match in the Great Hall of the University of Birmingham.

The National Badminton League (NBL) was a professional team badminton league in England. Organised by Badminton England, it was launched in October 2014 as the first ever national badminton league in the UK. Reaching seven franchise teams in its third and final season (16-17), the inaugural season launched with six teams. Team matches were played with an abbreviated scoring system across all five disciplines (best-of-five games, first four games played to nine points) and tie–break format (fifth game to five points), with one match each match night being broadcast live on Sky Sports in the first two seasons. The 16-17 season was broadcast on BT Sport. On 29 March 2017, it was announced on the National Badminton League website that it would cease operations with immediate effect.

== History ==
Badminton England announced the creation of the NBL in April 2014. A player auction was held in Milton Keynes on 2 June 2014. The first league fixtures took place on 6 October 2014. Team Derby were the winners of the inaugural Play-off Finals.

AJ Bell were announced as title sponsor of the NBL in November 2015, from which point it became the AJ Bell NBL.

Season 3 16-17 saw the introduction of two new franchises in Bristol Jets and Suffolk Saxons. MK Badminton did not continue into the 16-17 season.

BT Sport became the official broadcaster of the AJ Bell NBL in the 16-17 season.

On 29 March 2017, it was announced on the National Badminton League website that it would cease operations with immediate effect, as it was - in the view of Badminton England - not “self-sustainable in the short to medium term”.

== Format ==
The NBL consisted of seven franchises. The teams played each other once during the league season, either home or away. At the end of the regular season, the top two teams faced each other in the championship final to determine the winner of the NBL.

The match-night format saw teams playing 5 events (men's singles, women's singles, mixed doubles, men's doubles and women's doubles) - each played to 'best of 5 games'. Games were played to a first to 9 points rally scoring system with the deciding 5th game being a tiebreak played 'first to 5' points.

Only 2 players could 'double up' and play 2 events per match-night.

== Teams ==
Seven franchises competed in the 2016–17 season, six of which were affiliated with local universities.

Team name	Affiliated university	Home venue
Birmingham Lions	University of Birmingham	Barclaycard Arena, Birmingham; Great Hall, University of Birmingham, Birmingham
Team Derby	University of Derby	Derby Arena, Derby
Loughborough Sport	Loughborough University	Sir David Wallace Arena, Loughborough University, Loughborough
University of Nottingham Badminton	University of Nottingham	Albert Hall, Nottingham
Surrey Smashers	University of Surrey	Surrey Sports Park, University of Surrey, Guildford
Suffolk Saxons	University of Suffolk	Ipswich Corn Exchange, Ipswich
Bristol Jets	N/A	SGS WISE Arena, Bristol
