= Derby Arena =

Multi-purpose indoor arena and velodrome in Derby, England

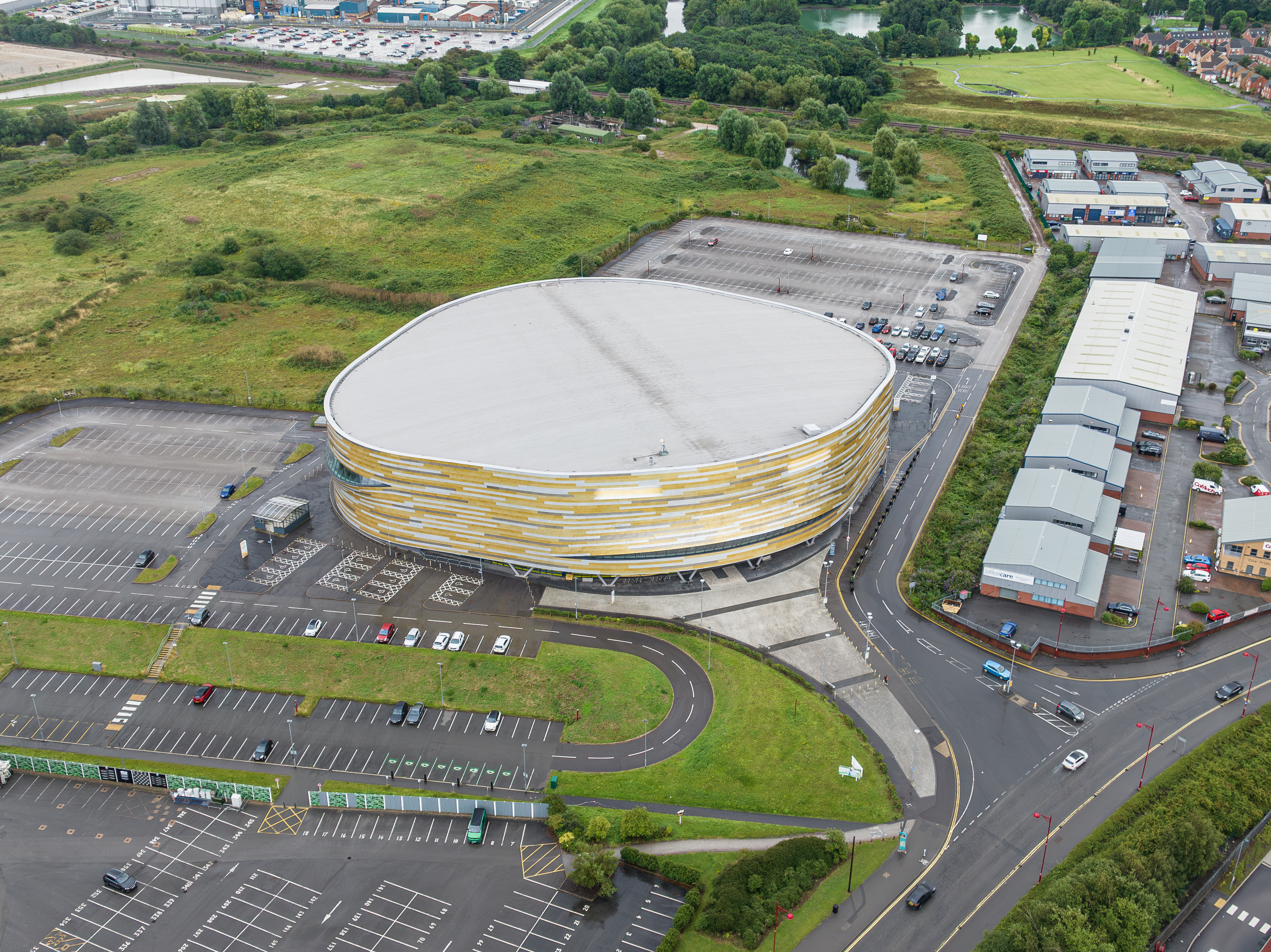
- Aerial view of Derby Arena, July 2023
- Interactive map of Derby Arena
- Location: Pride Park, Derby
- Coordinates: 52.9127°N 1.4464°W
- Owner: Derby City Council
- Operator: Derby City Council
- Capacity: 1,700 (velodrome); 5,000 (concerts)
- Surface: Siberian pine (velodrome)
- Field size: 250 metres

Construction
- Groundbreaking: 2012
- Built: 2012–2015
- Opened: 19 March 2015
- Cost: £27 million
- Architect: FaulknerBrowns
- Project manager: Mace
- Main contractor: Bowmer & Kirkland

Tenant
- Team Derby (2014–2015)

Website
- Derby Arena

Derby Arena is a multi-use indoor arena and velodrome at Pride Park in Derby, England. It was opened in 2015 and has hosted cycling, badminton, boxing and entertainment events.

== Construction ==
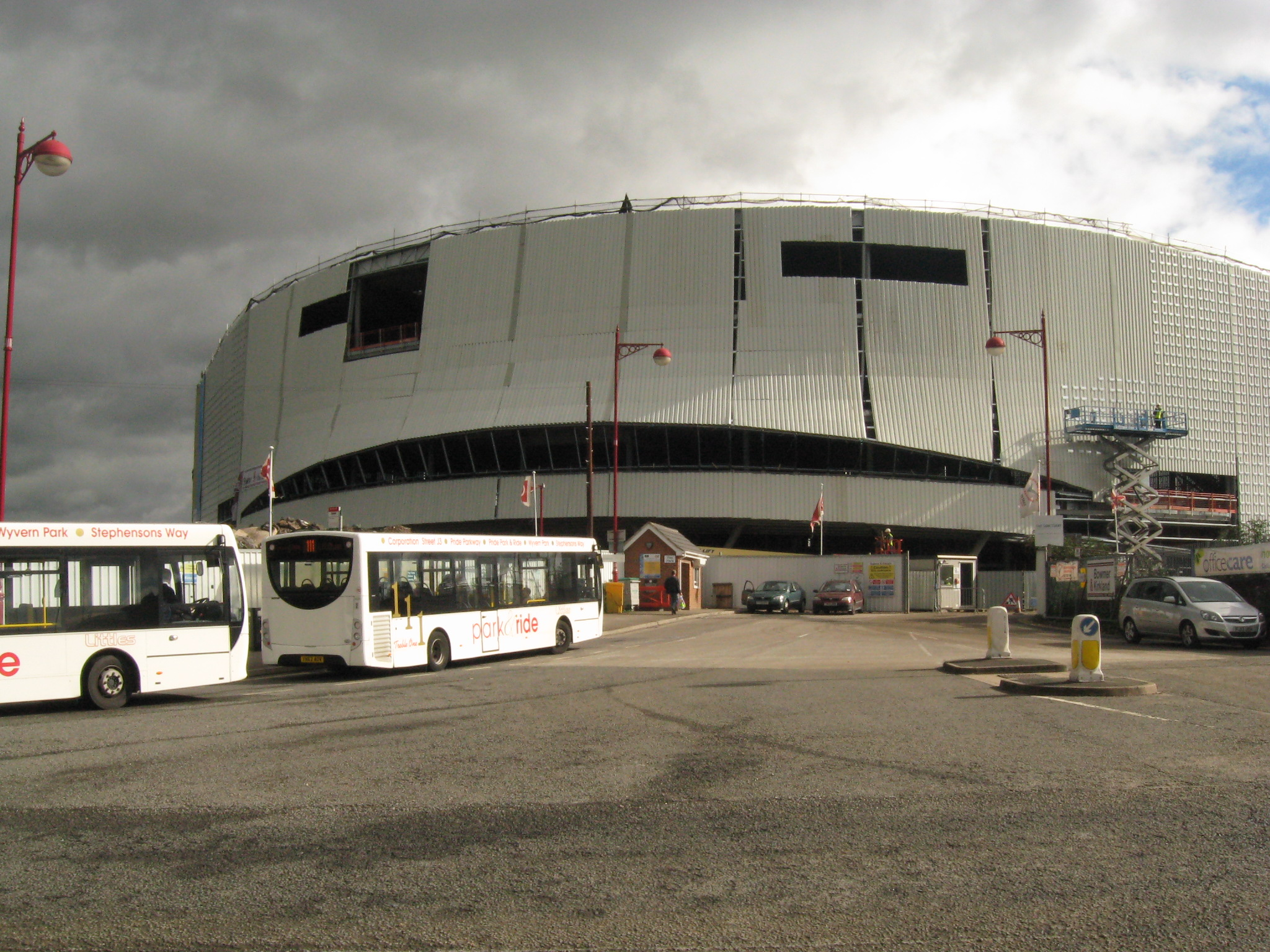
Derby Arena under construction in October 2013, as seen from Royal Way

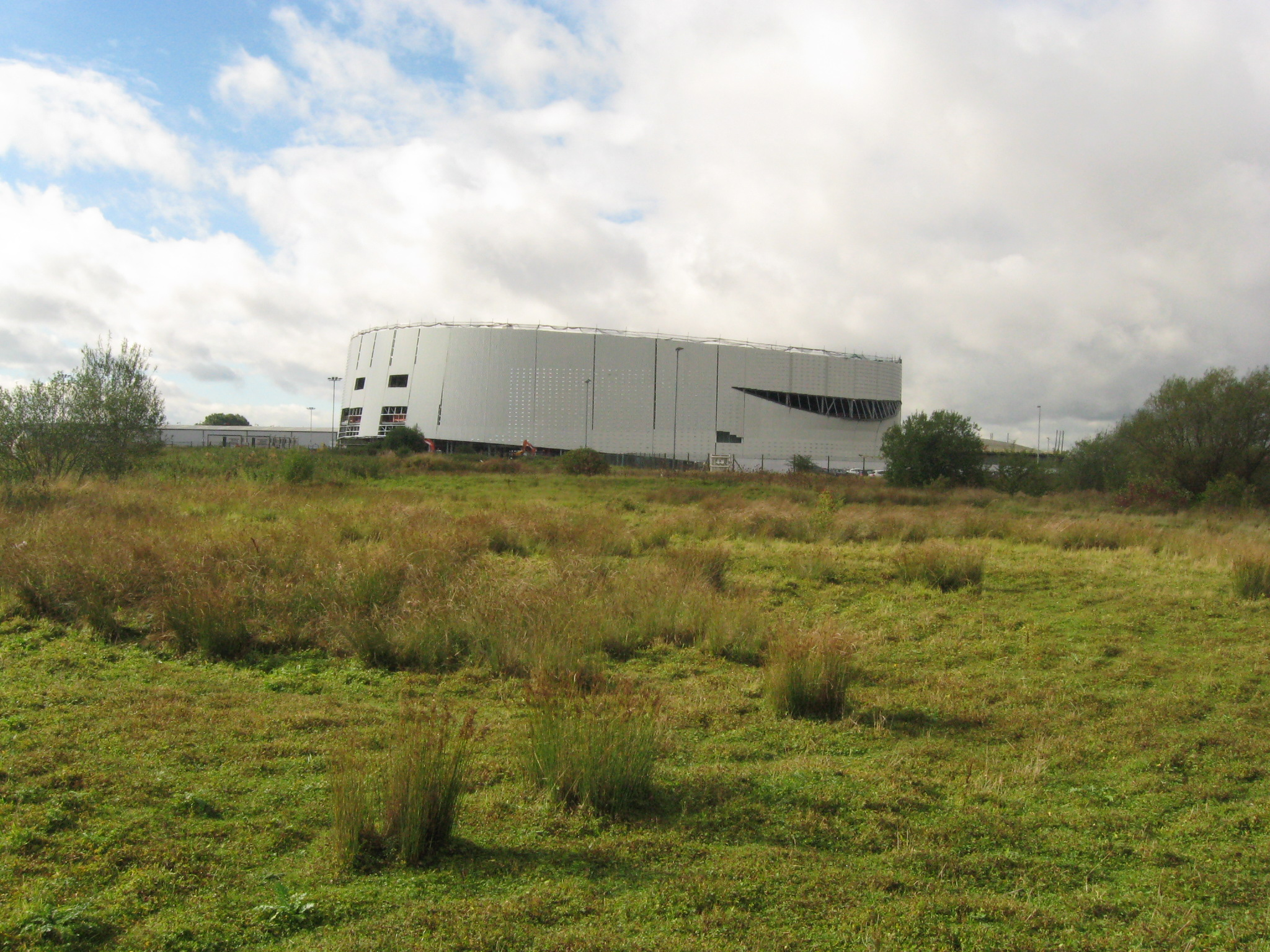
Derby Arena under construction viewed from within The Sanctuary Local Nature Reserve, October 2013

Construction was expected to be completed in November 2014 with the opening of the venue originally scheduled for January 2015. In May 2012 its development seemed uncertain due to a change of local government. Constructed by contractors Bowmer and Kirkland, it was scheduled for completion in 2014. The Arena was finally opened three months late in March 2015 by Sarah Storey and Margaret Beckett. It is Britain's fifth 250-metre indoor track, which is raised to allow easy access to the 12 badminton court size infield area. There are also a café, fitness gym, group exercise studios and a spinning studio.

Also proposed was an outdoor 1.7-kilometre (1.1 mi) closed road circuit race track and a mountain bike skills area which would have been built on The Sanctuary bird and wildlife reserve. A coalition of 16 local wildlife conservation groups expressed concern at the proposal, but it was approved in February 2014. An injunction brought against Derby City Council by Derbyshire Wildlife Trust led to a Judicial Review being granted which could have overturned the planning approval. On 15 March 2014 Derby City Council announced it was abandoning its plans to develop the site.

In August 2014 a Derby-based company, Moda Bicycles, was appointed to provide 100 bicycles for hire at the Arena, which would be painted black-and-blue to match the Arena's branding. Accreditation to be permitted to use the track requires a four-stage payable training course taking six hours to complete, first confirmed in a package of charges in August 2014.

== Events ==
=== Cycling ===
The Arena hosted its first major track meeting in August 2015, when it hosted the opening round of the 2015-16 Revolution series, featuring a number of Olympic and World champions including Bradley Wiggins, Mark Cavendish, Laura Trott, Joanna Rowsell Shand, Jason Kenny and Ed Clancy.

=== Badminton ===
National Badminton League franchise Team Derby played at the Arena during the league's first season in 2014–15, before relocating to the University of Derby Sports Centre.

=== Boxing ===
The venue hosted the 2024 England Boxing National Amateur Championships (formerly the ABA Championships), which is the premier amateur boxing tournament in England.

=== Entertainment ===
Derby City Council relocated their annual pantomime to the Arena from 2015 onwards, following the fire-related closure of the former Assembly Rooms venue. Other events to take place at the Arena include comedy shows by Jimmy Carr and Russell Brand. The venue's first music concert took place in October 2016, with the Happy Mondays supported by The Bluetones and Cast.

== See also ==
- List of cycling tracks and velodromes
