= Bowmer + Kirkland =

British construction services company

Bowmer + Kirkland Group
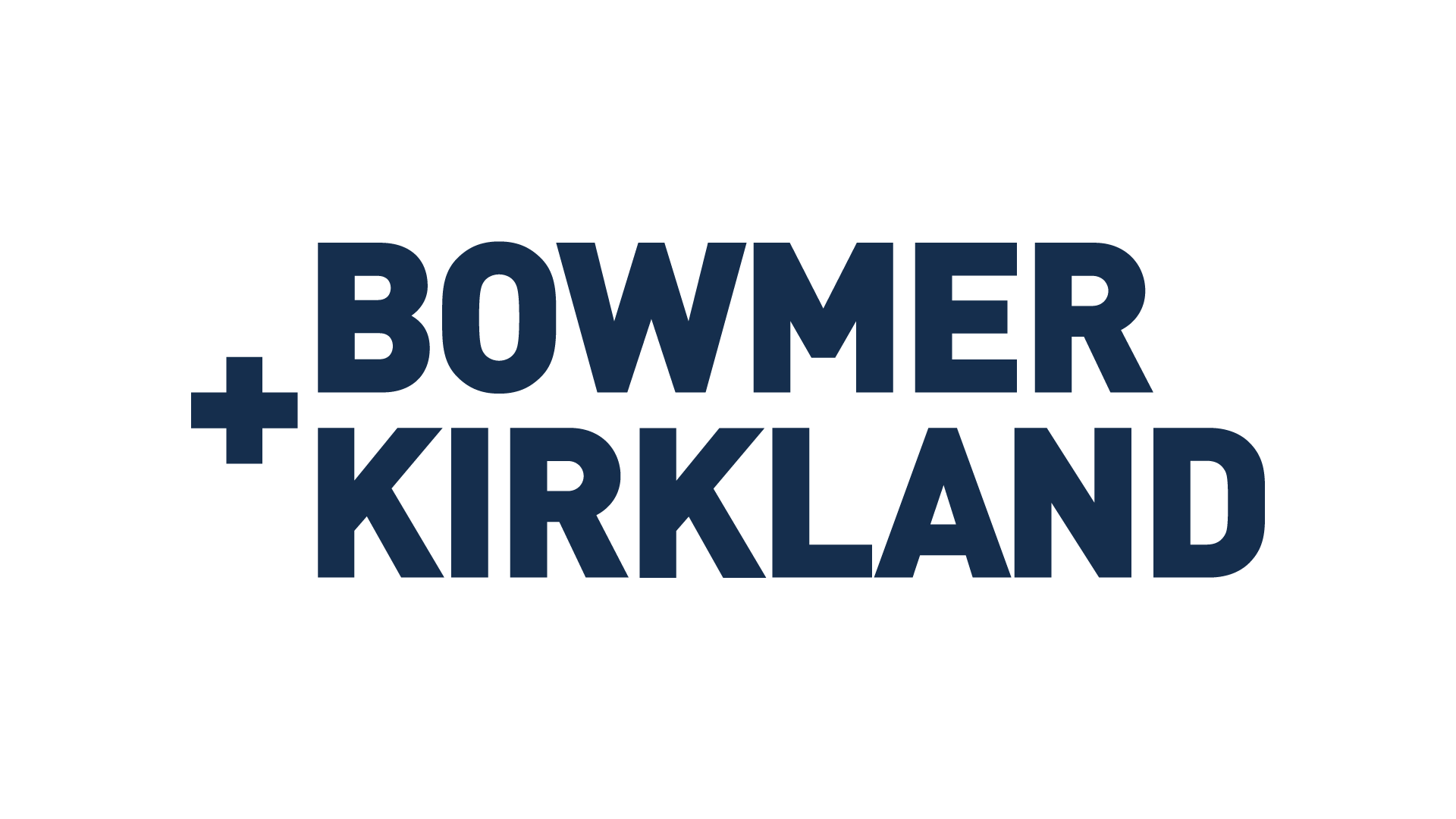
- Type: Construction services
- Founded: 1923
- Headquarters: Heage, Derbyshire, England
- Area served: UK, North America, the Middle East
- Key people: Jack Kirkland (Chairman)
- Revenue: £1,069.8 million (2019)
- Operating income: £71.0 million (2019)
- Net income: £57.2 million (2019)
- Website: www.bandk.co.uk

Bowmer + Kirkland Group is a British construction services business based in Heage, Derbyshire.

== History ==
The company was established in 1923 as a partnership between joiner Alfred Bowmer and bricklayer Robert William Kirkland.

In 1972, John Kirkland, the grandson of Robert William Kirkland, was appointed managing director of the company; four years later he became chairman as well. Over the following 43 years that Kirkland served as chairman, Bowmer + Kirkland slowly developed into one of the largest privately-owned construction firms in the UK.

In 2002, the firm reportedly surpassed the construction firm Sir Robert McAlpine. Two years later, Bowmer + Kirkland reportedly outdone long term competitor Bovis. In March 2008, the company's highest paid director received £8.6 million, which made them the best-paid director in the UK construction sector at that time.

In July 2009, Bowmer + Kirkland was involved in a crane collapse in Liverpool that left one man paralysed and 100 people removed from their homes. The company was subsequently found guilty of breaching health and safety laws over the incident.

In April 2010, the highest paid director at Bowmer & Kirkland was reportedly set to receive £10.2 million, which was the highest figure in the UK construction sector at that time. In 2013, the company announced that 45 jobs were at risk of redundancy.

Profitability increased considerably during the mid-2010s. In May 2017, the company reported a 53 percent rise in pre-tax profits while turnover was almost £1 billion.

In 2019, John Kirkland stepped down as chairman, the position being taken up by his son Jack; John died two years later.

In March 2023, the company purchased the offsite manufacturing division of Osborne for an undisclosed amount; prior to this, Bowmer + Kirkland had frequently worked together with Osborne across multiple projects. That same year, the firm was engaged in part of a £1.4 billion redevelopment scheme in Nottingham’s Island Quarter site.

In August 2025, Bowmer + Kirkland was one of four contractors to be assigned work by the Defence Infrastructure Organisation to build new single living accommodation for Britain's armed forces. That same year, the firm acquired the office interiors specialist Denton as part of a strategic expansion of its commercial fit-out activities.

== Major projects ==
Major projects have included:

- St George's Park National Football Centre in Staffordshire, completed in 2012
- Trinity Square in Gateshead, completed in 2013
- Center Parcs Woburn Forest in Bedfordshire, completed in 2014
- Derby Arena, completed in 2015
- St Marks Student Village for the University of Lincoln, completed in 2021
