= Tony Hibbert (musician) =

British bassist

Tony Hibbert (born 6 December 1956) is an English musician who played bass guitar in the synthpop band New Musik from 1977 to 1981. He was born in Tooting, London.

He played with New Musik on From A to B (1980) and Anywhere (1981), but later retired from the music industry. After his leaving, there was not a bass guitar used on the New Musik's third and final album, Warp.

In 1980, he played on Bruce Cockburn's album, Humans.

He is now a cycling coach at Herne Hill Velodrome.
