= Cccan't You See =

Single by Vicious Pink

from the album Vicious Pink
- Released: 1984
- Genre: Synth-pop; Hi-NRG
- Label: Parlophone
- Songwriters: Brian Moss; Josie Warden
- Producer: Tony Mansfield

Vicious Pink singles chronology
"8:15 to Nowhere" (1984)	"Cccan't You See" (1984)	"Fetish" / "Spooky" (1985)

Official audio
- "Cccan't You See" on YouTube

"Cccan't You See" is a 1984 single by the English synth-pop duo Vicious Pink. Released as their third single, it charted at No. 67 on the UK singles chart, becoming their only top 75 entry on that chart.

== Background ==
"Cccan't You See" was Vicious Pink's third single, after "My Private Tokyo" and "Je t'aime (moi non plus)". It was recorded in September 1983 at Buckinghamshire's FarmYard Studios.

For this single, the band had acquired a new producer, Tony Mansfield of New Musik; their previous producer, Dave Ball, was also a member of Soft Cell, and left after the release of "Je t'aime" after Soft Cell had an international hit single with "Tainted Love". The single featured Mansfield's Fairlight CMI, which was used to sample Russian choirs from shortwave radio in an effort to defuse tensions caused by the Cold War, which was a major issue at the time. In addition, vocalist Josephine Warden was sampled and then chopped into assorted rhythms. A Roland Juno-60, a Jupiter-8 and a LinnDrum machine were also used.

"Cccan't You See" had two B-sides, recorded consecutively. "8:15 to Nowhere" was recorded using a Roland TB-303. While Moss and Mansfield were recording it, Warden was watching a documentary on Jerry Lee Lewis in the studio's recreation room, and requested that they do a cover version of his 1957 song "Great Balls of Fire". For this, Mansfield recorded his guitar on to a Revox, scratched the tape reels and recorded the result onto the multitrack. Both B-sides were recorded on the same day at Eden Studios, and both records were produced by Mansfield and used his Fairlight CMI.

== Chart performance ==
The song charted at number 67 on the UK singles chart in September 1984, spending 11 weeks on the chart throughout August and October of that year. It would be their only top-75 placing on that chart; their previous single, "Je t'aime (moi non plus)", had charted at number 84 that April and their subsequent single, "Fetish/Spooky", would peak at number 87 in March 1985. "Cccan't You See" re-entered the chart in June 1985 for two weeks, peaking at number 95.

== Critical reception ==
Muriel Gray at Smash Hits said, "What a catchy little dance number. The vocals sounds like an 80s Marlene Dietrich, and with the backing of some interesting synths it looks as if it might be a minor hit."

== Usage in popular culture ==
"Cccan't You See" was one of the first records to be remixed by Razormaid! Productions, a DJ-only service which played both "Cccan't You See" and "8:15 to Nowhere". Parlophone released at least ten versions, with Razormaid issuing the original masters sent to them by Parlophone as Vicious Pink: Uncut and announcing more masters in 2004 as Vicious Pink: Uncut 2.

The song was sampled by Nightmares on Wax's "I'm for Real", which when released as a double A-side with "Aftermath", became that artist's only top 40 UK singles chart entry.
