= Santuario =

Santuario may refer to:

- Santuario, town and municipality in the Department of Risaralda, Colombia;
- El Santuario, town and municipality in the Antioquia Department, Colombia;
- Santuario (TV series), television series.

== See also ==
- Santuario station (disambiguation)
- Sanctuary (disambiguation)
