= A Little Bit of Jazz =

Single by Nick Straker Band

from the album The Nick Straker Band
- Released: May 1980
- Length: 5:27 (Album Version)
- Label: CBS (UK); Prelude (US)
- Songwriters: Andy Gierus, Nicholas Bailey

Nick Straker Band singles chronology
"Leaving on the Midnight Train" (1980)	"A Little Bit of Jazz" (1980)	"Like Dust" (1982)

"A Little Bit of Jazz" is a 1980 single by the group Nick Straker Band. With this song the British band had their only American success when it hit number one on the Dance Chart for one week. The single failed to chart on both the American and British top 40 charts, but it peaked at number thirty-five on the Soul Singles Chart.

== Track listings ==
=== 1981 release ===
12" vinyl

- US: Prelude / PRL D 612

Side one
No.	Title	Length
1.	"A Little Bit of Jazz"	5:24

Side two
No.	Title	Length
1.	"Space Age"	3:52

== Chart performance ==
Chart (1981)	Peak position
US Billboard Black Singles	35
US Billboard Club Play Singles	1
