= Wild Horse Nine (soundtrack) =

2026 film soundtrack album

Wild Horse Nine (Original Motion Picture Soundtrack)

Film score by Carter Burwell
- Released: 6 November 2026
- Recorded: 2026
- Studios: Abbey Road Studios, London
- Genre: Film score
- Length: 23:15
- Label: Hollywood
- Producer: Carter Burwell

Carter Burwell chronology
Good Fortune (2025)	Wild Horse Nine (2026)	Jack of Spades (2027)

Wild Horse Nine (Original Motion Picture Soundtrack) is the film score for the 2026 film Wild Horse Nine directed by Martin McDonagh starring John Malkovich and Sam Rockwell. The original score is composed by Carter Burwell, a frequent collaborator of McDonagh and the album accompanied 17 tracks which released via Hollywood Records on 6 November 2026.

== Background and development ==
Martin McDonagh's frequent collaborator Carter Burwell scored Wild Horse Nine. Burwell began discussing the score with director McDonagh in March 2023, following the 95th Academy Awards, where McDonagh's The Banshees of Inisherin received nine nominations but won no awards. McDonagh subsequently sent Burwell an unfinished screenplay for Wild Horse Nine, whose development Burwell followed for years.

After the production began, Burwell discussed the musical direction with McDonagh. He identified the relationship between the two central characters, Chris (John Malkovich) and Lee (Sam Rockwell) as the most important emotional element to convey through the music. He sought to express their underlying affection through a musical approach that reflected their tendency to communicate through arguments and confrontations rather than conventional displays of emotion.

The film's 1973 setting in Chile and Easter Island also influenced Burwell's research. He explored the musical traditions of both locations but found no clearly identifiable historical musical tradition on Eastern Island. Instead, he incorporated Andean instruments associated with Chilean music, including the charango and ronroco, to establish a connection with the film's geographical setting.

== Composition ==
The score combines elements of multiple genres, which included Western film music, Andean instrumentation, orchestral arrangements and Indonesian gamelan. While experimenting with the charango, Burwell developed a melody influenced by classic Hollywood Westerns, particularly the musical styles associated with director Howard Hawks and composer Dimitri Tiomkin. The theme features a string melody accompanied by orchestra, without the prominent brass arrangements traditionally associated with the genre.

Burwell intended the Western-inspired theme to reflect Chris and Lee as ageing gunslingers whose relationship combines affection, conflict and humour. He also incorporated Indonesian gamelan gongs, played in their lower registers, to evoke the mystery of Easter Island and complement the main theme. Other musical elements include songs from the 1970s, which establish the film's period and reflect the protagonists' musical tastes, including an apparent interest in Judy Collins. Three choral pieces by Carl Orff contribute to the atmosphere surrounding the island and its wild horses.

For scenes in which Chris dictates his memoirs, Burwell composed additional pieces for celesta and tuned percussions. Inspired by the character's childlike language and apparent innocence despite his recollections of political violence and assassinations, these compositions feature a delicate, lullaby-like quality. The music underwent revisions during post-production as McDonagh and editor Mikkel E. G. Nielsen restructured the sequences, particularly the passage concerning the assassination of Patrice Lumumba.

== Recording ==
The score was recorded at Abbey Road Studios' Studio 2 in London, featuring a small orchestra, charango, ronroco and Indonesian gamelan instruments. Four octaves of gongs were hired for the sessions, occupying much of the studio space to accommodate the score's extensive low-register percussion arrangements. Percussionist Frank Ricotti performed the gong passages, using a rolling chair to move between the instruments. Much of the contrasting musical elements that combined Andean string instruments and orchestral arrangements with the deep, atmospheric gamelan sounds had been blended into the overall score.

== Reception ==
Nikki Baughan of Screen International described it as "elegiac, romantic Western-tinged score, which also brings in Pacific instrumentation." Ian Freer of Empire called it an "elegiac score". David Rooney of The Hollywood Reporter wrote "The melodic score by another longtime collaborator, Carter Burwell, ideally crystallizes the movie's changing moods." Phil de Semiyen of Time Out described it as a "soulful" score. Katie Walsh of Daily Herald wrote "Carter Burwell's score blends "downbeat Western" with eerie, otherworldly vocals to evoke the spiritual reflection invited by this unique place." Pete Hammond of Deadline Hollywood wrote "Frequent collaborator Carter Burwell's score perfectly complements the changing moods and tones in haunting melodies." Mitchell Davey of Fox19 wrote "Carter Burwell's score is atmospheric and perfectly accentuates the tone." Michael Bodey of Australian Financial Review called it a "sweet score".

== Track listing ==
No.	Title	Length
1.	"Our First Big Heads – Sunset Surveillance"	1:15
2.	"My Cancer"	1:16
3.	"The Dinosaurs"	2:38
4.	"Lullaby for Patrice"	2:49
5.	"Just the Dallas – Flights to"	1:04
6.	"I Met a Horse"	2:31
7.	"She's Life and I'm Leaving It"	0:41
8.	"Talked to Your Wife – Night Shots"	0:47
9.	"I Liked This Horse"	1:18
10.	"The Last Morning"	1:14
11.	"Peligroso"	1:16
12.	"Is It Really True"	0:51
13.	"Rosa and the Dwarf"	0:39
14.	"The Greater Good – Fighting with the Cavalry"	1:27
15.	"Still Got It"	1:10
16.	"I'm So Lonesome I Could Cry"	0:42
17.	"I'll See You"	1:37
Total length:		23:15

== Personnel ==
Credits adapted from Film Music Reporter:

- Composer, orchestrator and conductor: Carter Burwell
- Music supervisor: Connie Farr
- Recording and mixing studio: Abbey Road Recording Studios, England
- Recording and mixing engineer: Simon Rhodes
- Recordist: Christopher Parker
- Assistant: Freddie Light
- Orchestra contractor: Amy Ewen for Isobel Griffiths
- Orchestra leader: Everton Nelson
- Lead guitar and charango: John Parricelli
- Guitar: Frank Ricotti
- Librarian: Jill Streater
- Composer's assistant: Dean Parker
- Music coordinator: GeorgiaMae Bromley
- Music editor: Neil Stemp
- Additional song arrangements: Graham McCusker

== Accolades ==
Award	Date of ceremony	Category	Nominee(s)	Result	Ref.
Hollywood Music in Media Awards	November 18, 2026	Original Score – Feature Film	Carter Burwell	Pending	
