= Warp (album) =

Studio album by New Musik
- Released: 5 March 1982
- Recorded: 1981–1982
- Genre: Synthpop
- Length: 47:11
- Label: Epic
- Producer: Tony Mansfield

New Musik chronology
| Anywhere (1981) | Warp (1982) |

Professional ratings
Review scores
| Source | Rating |
|---|---|
| Allmusic | 2.5/5 stars |

Warp is the third and final album from New Musik released on 5 March 1982.

== Track listing ==
=== LP: EPC 85567 ===
All songs written by Tony Mansfield, except where noted.

==== Side One ====
1. "Here Come The People" – 3:26
2. "Going Around Again" – 2:55
3. "A Train On Twisted Tracks" – 3:26
4. "I Repeat" – 4:28
5. "All You Need Is Love" – 4:21
6. "All You Need Is Love" (Lennon–McCartney) – 5:38

==== Side Two ====
1. "Kingdoms for Horses" – 4:16
2. "Hunting" – 4:15
3. "The New Evolutionist (Example 'A')" – 3:19
4. "Green and Red (Respectively)" (Mansfield, Gates, Venner) – 3:05
5. "The Planet Doesn't Mind" – 3:40
6. "Warp" – 4:22

=== 2001 Epic Records International CD Reissue: EICP 7015 ===
1. "Here Come The People" – 3:26
2. "Going Around Again" – 2:55
3. "A Train On Twisted Tracks" – 3:26
4. "I Repeat" – 4:28
5. "All You Need Is Love" – 4:21
6. "All You Need Is Love" (Lennon–McCartney) – 5:38
7. "Kingdoms for Horses" – 4:16
8. "Hunting" – 4:15
9. "The New Evolutionist (Example 'A')" – 3:19
10. "Green and Red (Respectively)" (Mansfield, Gates, Venner) – 3:05
11. "The Planet Doesn't Mind" – 3:40
12. "Warp" – 4:22
13. "The Planet Doesn't Mind" (Single Version) – 3:36
14. "The Planet Doesn't Mind" (12 Inch Version) – 4:15
15. "24 Hours From Culture - Part II" – 3:40
16. "Twelfth House" – 4:37
17. "Here Come The People" (Remix) – 5:27

== Personnel ==
- Tony Mansfield – keyboards, guitars, vocals
- Clive Gates – keyboards, vocals
- Cliff Venner – percussion, vocals
- Ion Baciu Jr. – grand piano solo on "All You Need Is Love"

== Production ==
- Produced by Tony Mansfield
- Engineered by Peter Hammond
- Mastered by Geoff Pesche at Tape One
- Recorded at TMC
- Design: Tony Mansfield and Rosław Szaybo
- Artwork and Typography: Studio Gerrard
