= Santuario station =

Santuario station may refer to:

- Santuario Mártires de Cristo Rey light rail station, a rapid transit station on line 1 in Guadalajara, Mexico
- Santuario metro station, a rapid transit station on line 3 in Guadalajara, Mexico
- Santuario Nossa Senhora de Fatima-Sumare metro station, a rapid transit station in São Paulo, Brazil
- Santuario railway station, a railway station in Liguria region, Italy
- Iztapalapa metro station, a rapid transit station in the Colonia El Santuario neighborhood of Mexico City, Mexico

== See also ==
- Santuario (disambiguation)
