= Anywhere (New Musik album) =

Studio album by New Musik
- Released: 6 March 1981
- Recorded: July 1980–81
- Genre: Synthpop
- Length: 53:21
- Label: GTO
- Producer: Tony Mansfield

New Musik chronology
From A to B (1980)	Anywhere (1981)	Warp (1982)

Professional ratings
Review scores
Source	Rating
Allmusic	3/5 stars
Smash Hits	6½/10

Anywhere is the second album from New Musik released on 6 March 1981. The cassette edition of the album contained two extra songs not present on the vinyl copies. A digitally remastered version called Anywhere... Plus was released in 2001. Two singles were released in the United Kingdom, "Luxury" on 30 January 1981 and "While You Wait" on 3 April 1981.

"Areas" has been covered by alternative rock band The Gathering on their 2013 album Afterwords.

== Track listing ==
All songs written and composed by Tony Mansfield unless noted.

=== GTO Records LP: GTLP 044 ===
Side one
No.	Title	Length
1.	"They All Run After the Carving Knife"	5:52
2.	"Areas"	4:11
3.	"Churches"	4:54
4.	"This World of Walter"	2:56
5.	"Luxury"	3:48
6.	"While You Wait"	5:08

Side two
No.	Title	Length
1.	"Changing Minds"	4:53
2.	"Peace"	5:14
3.	"Design"	3:44
4.	"Traps"	4:03
5.	"Division"	4:21
6.	"Back to Room One"	4:18

Various 1981 cassette releases of the album includes the bonus tracks "Under Attack" (4:04) after "While You Wait," and "And" (4:38) after "Back to Room One." These songs only ever appeared again on a reference CD-R made at Abbey Road in 1997, titled Songs of New Musik, as part of a 27-minute track containing various album and single songs from that era.

=== 1994 - GTO Records CD: GTO 474615-2 and 2001 - Edsel Records CD: EDCD 679 (Anywhere... Plus) CD bonus tracks ===
No.	Title	Writer(s)	Length
13.	"The Office"	Clive Gates	4:29
14.	"From The Village"		3:32
15.	"Guitars"		3:31

13 is the B-side of the "Luxury" 7" single.
14 and 15 are the B-sides of the "While You Wait" 12" single.
The 2001 Japanese CD release (Epic Records International--EICP 7016) and 2022 UK LP+12" release (Music on Vinyl/Sony Music--MOVLP2867) include "While You Wait (12 Inch Version)" (5:58) as an extra bonus track, after "The Office."

== Personnel ==
- Tony Mansfield – guitar, vocals, keyboards
- Clive Gates – keyboards
- Tony Hibbert – bass
- Phil Towner – drums, percussion

Production

- Andrew Douglas: Photography, Sleeve Design
- Peter Hammond: Engineer
- Alan Robinson: Liner Notes
