= Vicious Pink =

British musical duo

- Origin: Leeds, England
- Genres: Synth-pop; new wave
- Years active: 1981–1986; 2023–present
- Labels: Parlophone; Capitol; Minimal Wave
- Members: Josephine Warden; Brian Moss

Vicious Pink is an English synth-pop duo formed in Leeds in 1981. They reformed and released Unexpected, a collection of previously unreleased 1980s recordings, on Minimal Wave Records in 2024. With a catchy sound and a penchant for highly provocative and sexualized lyrics, the band's music was aimed toward clubs rather than commercial hits.

== History ==
Vicious Pink consisted of two members, English/ and French singer Josephine Warden and keyboardist Brian Moss. The duo began as backing vocalists for Soft Cell, then known as Vicious Pink Phenomena. Vicious Pink are remembered for four dance singles: "8:15 to Nowhere", "Cccan't You See", and "Fetish" produced by Tony Mansfield of New Musik fame. Their last single "Take Me Now" was produced by Gary Moberley. The band also backed Soft Cell at The Warehouse in Leeds. The American owner of The Warehouse, Mike Wiand, was their manager. Wiand was also a key factor in the success of the 1980s dance track "Let the Music Play" by Shannon, which was released in the UK on his Warehouse Records label. Vicious Pink played live at The Ritz in New York in December 1984.

Vicious Pink were able to briefly attain a cult level of success without ever breaking into the mainstream. Although they had started releasing music in 1982, they failed to attract much attention until the release of the single "Cccan't You See" (UK No. 67) and its instrumental B-side "8:15 to Nowhere" in 1984. Over the next two years, both sides of this single accrued play in clubs on both sides of the Atlantic. In 1983, the duo recorded two unreleased demo, "Blue" and "The Tape Gallery", and a self-titled album released in 1986, after they had ceased recording. This album was a collection of previously released singles. Warden later married a London-based music lawyer, and Moss continued his music career; he is now the keyboardist for the artist, Mirazma.

In 2015, Vicious Pink released various mixes of "Kings of the Mountains", a 2012 track. In 2019, Vicious Pink described "Organiclon Sentient Ship" as new music.

In 2022, Vicious Pink released the double LP West View, containing remasters and demos. On 21 September 2023 during a live stream of Soft Cell and Vicious Pink music and rarities hosted by Dakeyene on Twitch TV, Josie confirmed the band would release a new album, Unexpected on Minimal Wave Records before the end of the year and debuted a new song, "Not Your Kind of Girl", and that they would reform for live dates the following year.

== Discography ==
=== Albums ===
- Vicious Pink (1986)
- West View (2022)
- Unexpected (2024)

=== Singles ===
- "My Private Tokyo" (1982)
- "Je T'aime" (1983) (UK #84)
- "8:15 to Nowhere" (1984)
- "Cccan't You See" (1984) (UK #67)
- "Fetish" / "Spooky" (1985) (UK #87)
- "Cccan't You See" (Remix) (1985) (UK #95)
- "Take Me Now" (1986)
