= Pride Park =

Business park in the UK

Coordinates: 52°54′50.90″N 1°27′30.38″W

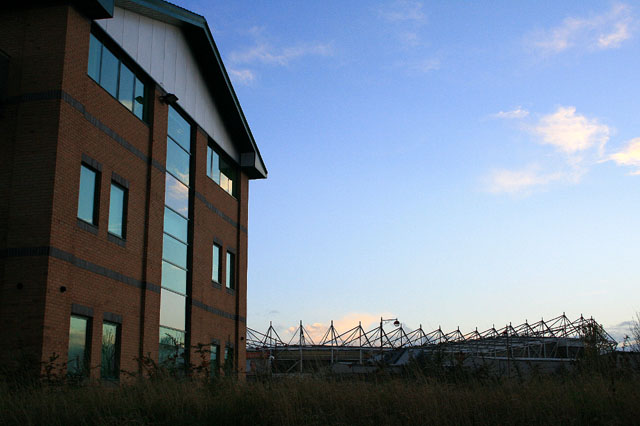
Office building on Pride Park, with Pride Park Stadium in the background

Pride Park is a business park on the southern outskirts of the city centre of Derby, England. It covers 80 hectares of contaminated former industrial land between the River Derwent and railway lines, and was developed between the 1990s and early 2000s. Pride Park Stadium, Derby Arena and The Sanctuary Local Nature Reserve are also located within Pride Park.

== History ==
The site was formerly part of the Derby Works railway yards, and was derelict for many years. It was the original site of Derby's railway manufacturing industry, but land here had also been used for gas- and coke works, gravel abstraction and landfill. These uses left behind large amounts of industrial contaminants, including tars, phenols, heavy metals, ammonia and boron. Extensive redevelopment took place over 10 years to reclaim the brownfield site, including the building of a new access road to open the area up. Ten hectares of the site was transformed into a Local Nature Reserve called The Sanctuary, in conjunction with Derby City Council. Stan Brewster helped design several of the bridges built.

== Occupants ==
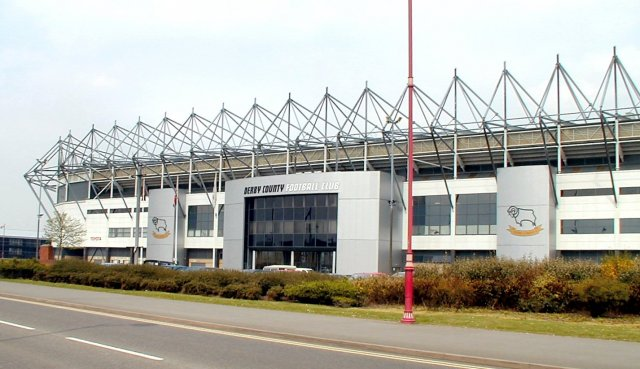
Pride Park Stadium

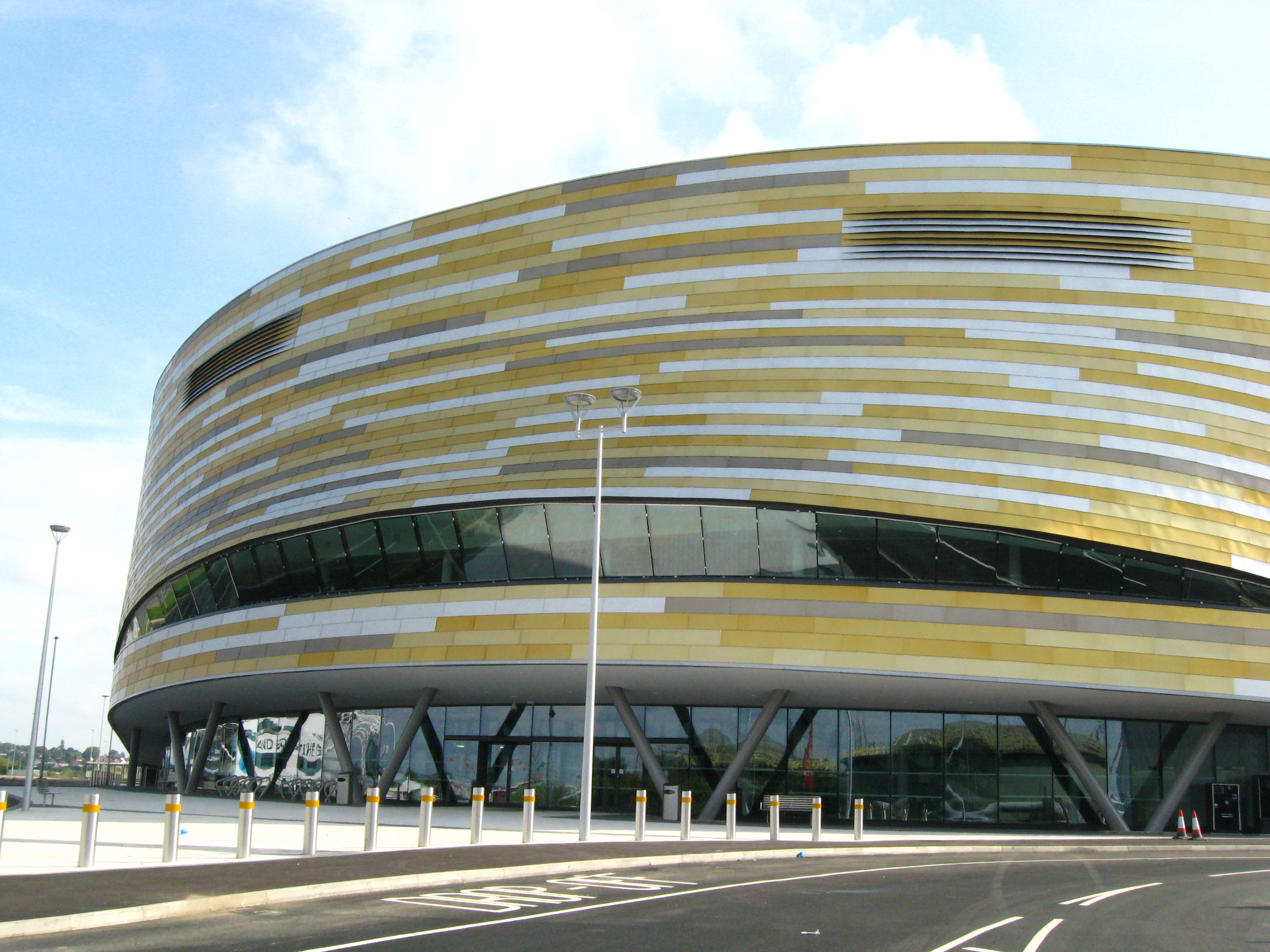
Derby Arena

- It has been home of Derby County F.C.'s Pride Park Stadium since 1997, when they relocated from the Baseball Ground in the Normanton district.
- Derby Arena is a multi-purpose sports and events venue adjacent to Pride Park Stadium, which opened in 2015.
- A Park & Ride car park for access to Derby city centre is located next to the stadium.
- Internet bank Egg plc had its headquarters and call centre in the business park until 2011, when it was taken over by Barclaycard, and closed. The building was subsequently occupied by HEROtsc, retaining its function as a call centre.
- The business park also houses a Holiday Inn Express hotel and several car dealerships.
- The sports goods retailer JJB Sports has offices on the Park.
- UTC Derby Pride Park (formerly Derby Manufacturing UTC), a university technical college, opened in September 2015.

== Expansion Plan ==
Derby County Football Club are proposed to expand facilities on offer around the football stadium with a £20 million development plan. This is despite the club being unsuccessful in their bid to include the stadium as a venue in England's bid to host the 2018 FIFA World Cup.

On 3 October 2011, Derby County Football Club announced that it had submitted plans to Derby City Council for a £7 million development of land outside Pride Park Stadium, which the club named "The Plaza @ Pride Park".

These plans included five cafes/restaurants, two convenience stores and 2,000 square metres of office space. The plans were scaled down from the planned £20 million development proposed in 2007. Derby County CEO Tom Glick, said that these plans would help the club deal with the new Financial Fair Play regulations which will be introduced in the Football League from 2012, as revenue from the Plaza will be reinvested back into the club.

This planned development also coincided with a plan from the City Council to build a multi-use sports arena on the same site as the proposed Plaza.
