= Shades of Liberty =

Studio album by Silent Running
- Released: June 1984
- Genres: New wave, rock
- Length: 40:42
- Label: EMI
- Producer: Peter Walsh

Silent Running chronology
Shades of Liberty (1984)	Walk on Fire (1987)

Shades of Liberty is the debut studio album from Belfast new wave/rock band Silent Running. It was released in 1984 by EMI, and produced by Peter Walsh.

== Background ==
Prior to signing to EMI, Silent Running recruited George Beavis on keyboards and together the band recorded tracks such as "Speed of Life" for their proposed first album. However, Beavis was subsequently dismissed and replaced with Alex White. The line-up then recorded Shades of Liberty. Three singles were released from the album: "Emotional Warfare", "Young Hearts", and "Sticks and Stones". Despite attempts to gain commercial success, the band never achieved the desired breakthrough. "Young Hearts" was the only single to make a chart appearance in the UK, where it reached No. 92. Shades of Liberty failed to chart. Both "Young Hearts" and "Sticks and Stones" were released within the UK and Europe only, while "Emotional Warfare" was released in America and Europe.

Shades of Liberty was the band's only album release for EMI. A second album for EMI was planned and the single "No Faith is Blind" preceded it in 1985. However, the limited success of the single resulted in the label cancelling the second album and dropping the band. They would sign to Atlantic Records after, where they would record two albums.

== Recording ==
The album was recorded at both The Manor and Windmill Lane Studios in Dublin, while it was mixed at The Manor and Air Studios. It was recorded during January–February 1984.

== Release ==
The album was released by EMI Records in the UK, Europe and North America. In North America, the album was titled Emotional Warfare, after the leading (and only) single in that territory. The release featured slightly different front artwork, with a black background replacing the white of the European sleeve. The back artwork on the European and North America editions are completely different. The album has not seen a CD release.

== Promotion ==
A music video was filmed to promote the "Emotional Warfare" and "Young Hearts" singles. In 1984, the band appeared on UK TV show The Tube, where they performed "Emotional Warfare" and "Sticks and Stones". On the German TV show Musik Convoy, the band performed "Young Hearts".

== Track listing ==
No.	Title	Writer(s)	Length
1.	"Home is Where the Heart Is"	Richard Collett, Peter Gamble	3:58
2.	"Emotional Warfare"	Tony Scott, Ian Gault, Alex White, Collett, Gamble	5:08
3.	"One in a Million Day"	Collett, Gamble, Scott	3:50
4.	"Sticks and Stones"	Scott, Gault, White, Collett, Gamble	4:08
5.	"That's Life (In the Real World)"	Scott, Gault, White, Collett, Gamble	5:52
6.	"Shades of Liberty"	Collett, Gamble, Gault, Scott	4:20
7.	"Crimson Days"	Gamble, Gault, Scott	3:58
8.	"Young Hearts"	Collett, Gamble, Gault, Scott	3:38
9.	"Go for the Heart"	Gamble	5:50

== Critical reception ==
Professional ratings
Review scores
Source	Rating
AllMusic	2/5 stars
Billboard	favorable
Melody Maker	5/5 stars
Record Mirror	3.5/5 stars

Upon release, the album received a five out of five star review in the Melody Maker magazine headlined "Silent Classic". In the American magazine Billboard, Shades of Liberty was included under the 'Recommended' section of the 'Pop' albums section. The magazine described the album as "U2-style wall of sound to a disco beat."

== Chart performance ==
=== Singles ===
==== "Young Hearts" ====
Chart (1984)	Peak position
UK Singles Chart	92

== Personnel ==
Silent Running

- Peter Gamble - vocals
- Tony Scott - guitar
- Alex White - keyboards
- Richard Collett - bass
- Ian Gault - drums

Additional personnel

- Peter Walsh - producer, engineer
- Jif - assistant engineer at Air
- Steve Chase - assistant engineer at The Manor
- Kevin Killen - assistant engineer at Windmill Lane
- Design RX - The Creative Department Ltd. - sleeve artwork
- Ursula Steiger - photography
