= Duke (musician) =

British singer, songwriter and producer

- Born: Mark Carson Adams Newcastle upon Tyne, England
- Origin: England
- Genres: Soul, R&B, Pop, House
- Occupations: Singer-songwriter, producer
- Instruments: Vocalist, Guitar, Bass, Keyboard, Drums
- Years active: 1994–present
- Labels: MJF Music, Universal Music Group
- Publisher: Sony Music Publishing
- Spouse: Jacqueline Adams (1998-present)

Duke (born Mark Carson Adams) is an English singer, songwriter and producer.

== Biography ==
He was born in Newcastle upon Tyne, England. He had two Top 10 hits on the Billboard Hot Dance Music/Club Play chart: his deep house version of "So in Love with You", which was his biggest hit, reaching No. 1 in 1997, and his follow-up "Greater," which peaked at No. 9 in 1998.

== Discography ==
=== Albums ===
- The Ten Commandments of Love (1995)
- Duke (1998)

=== Singles and EPs ===
- "So in Love with You" (1994)
- "New Beginning" (1994)
- "Make Believeland" (1995)
- "Womanchild" (1997)
- "Greater" (1998)
- "Soul Sister Soul Brother" (2002)
- "So in Love with You (K-Klass & Triple Dee \ Hoxton Whores \ MiOn)" (2012)

== See also ==
- List of number-one dance hits (United States)
- List of artists who reached number one on the US Dance chart
