= So in Love with You (Duke song) =

Single by Duke

from the album The 10 Commandments Of Love
- B-side: "Remix"
- Released: 1994
- Genre: Disco; house
- Length: 4:11
- Label: CNR Music; Dance Street; Virgin
- Songwriter: Mark Carson Adams
- Producer: Tony Mansfield

Duke singles chronology
"So in Love with You" (1994)	"New Beginning" (1994)

Music video
- "So in Love with You" on YouTube

"So in Love with You" is a song by British singer, songwriter and producer Mark Carson Adams under the name Duke in 1994. Released by CNR Music, Dance Street and Virgin Records, it became the singer's most successful hit and was also included on his 1995 album, The 10 Commandments Of Love. The single's radio edit is mixed by Norman Cook, as Pizzaman. It reached number three in the Netherlands and number 12 in Flemish Belgium. The track has since been remixed and re-released several times; in 1996, 2000, 2001 and 2012. The 1996 version peaked at number four in Italy and number 22 on the UK Singles Chart, while reaching number two on the UK Dance Singles Chart. In 1997, it peaked at number-one on the US Billboard Hot Dance Music/Club Play chart.

== Critical reception ==
Larry Flick from Billboard magazine described "So in Love with You" as a "vibrant disco ditty", noting that Duke "brings a friendly vibe to the song with a voice that is actually better suited to pop airwaves than underground dance-floors—though there's plenty here for club kids to nosh on". In October 1994, Mandi James from Melody Maker wrote, "The melancholic vocoder vocals and midnight hustle rhythms are on an almost Herbie Hancock tip. Old skool house before the 4/4 fascism kicked in, this is perfect for that 3am eternal." Pan-European magazine Music & Media stated that "falsettos are rare. Here's the first convincing high-pitched male pop singer since Jimmy Somerville. Duke has apparently listened a lot to Marvin Gaye's 'What's Going On'." Upon the 1995 re-release, they wrote that the song, "with its mid-tempo romanticism is one of those songs that sound awfully familiar, even though it's the first time you hear them."

A reviewer from Music Week's RM Dance Update said it is "a great track in its own right — lots of Latin flavour topped with Duke's cool vocals". In 1996, Music Week gave it a score of four out of five, noting that it is "evoking the infectious vibes of War's 'Low Rider' and the vocal splendour of Marvin Gaye." The magazine's James Hamilton declared it as a "simply marvellous Marvin Gaye/William DeVaughn-ish falsetto soulful European smash with a madly infectious summery humming 'la-la-la-la-la na' refrain". In 1997, Music Week editor, Alan Jones, wrote, "Hopefully we'll catch on this time, since it's a funkily soulful groove, with a bassline reminiscent of Sub Sub's 'Ain't No Use', elements of Freakpower's 'Turn On...' and a sweet vocal not far removed from Marvin Gaye's 'Got to Give It Up'. A good radio record."

== Track listing ==
- CD single, Netherlands
1. "So in Love with You" (Pizzaman Radio Friendly Vibe) – 3:58
2. "So in Love with You" (Accapella) – 3:53
- CD maxi, Europe
1. "So in Love with You" (Pizzaman Radio Friendly Vibe) – 3:56
2. "So in Love with You" (Pizzaman House Vocal) – 7:40
3. "So in Love with You" (Pizzaman 5 AM Dub) – 7:02
4. "So in Love with You" (Pizzaman House Dub) – 7:28

== Charts ==
=== Weekly charts ===
Chart (1994–95)	Peak position
Belgium (Ultratop 50 Flanders)	12
Belgium (Ultratop 50 Wallonia)	22
Europe (Eurochart Hot 100)	75
Netherlands (Dutch Top 40)	3
Netherlands (Single Top 100)	3
UK Singles (OCC)	95
UK Club Chart (Music Week)	22

Chart (1996)	Peak position
Europe (Eurochart Hot 100)	68
Italy (FIMI)	5
Italy (Musica e dischi)	4
Italy Airplay (Music & Media)	10
Latvia (Latvijas Top 30)	12
Scotland (OCC)	19
UK Singles (OCC)	22
UK Dance (OCC)	2
UK R&B (OCC)	4
UK Airplay (Music Week)	30
UK Club Chart (Music Week)	2
UK Pop Tip Club Chart (Music Week)	5

Chart (1997)	Peak position
Latvia (Latvijas Top 50)	9
US Hot Dance Music/Club Play (Billboard)	1

Chart (2000)	Peak position
Scotland (OCC)	66
UK Singles (OCC)	65
UK Independent Singles (OCC)	13

=== Year-end charts ===
Chart (1995)	Position
Belgium (Ultratop Flanders)	61
Belgium (Ultratop Wallonia)	83
Netherlands (Dutch Top 40)	26
Netherlands (Single Top 100)	45

Chart (1996)	Position
Latvia (Latvijas Top 30)	106
UK Club Chart (Music Week)	52
UK Pop Tip Club Chart (Music Week)	32

Chart (1997)	Position
Latvia (Latvijas Top 50)	197

== Certifications ==
Certifications for "So in Love with You"
Region	Certification	Certified units/sales
United Kingdom (BPI) Sales since 2022	Silver	200,000^{‡}
^{‡} Sales+streaming figures based on certification alone.
