= Deep (Silent Running album) =

Studio album by Silent Running
- Released: September 1989
- Genre: Rock
- Length: 45:05
- Label: Atlantic
- Producer: Silent Running; Frankie LaRocka; Peter Denenberg; John Eden

Silent Running chronology
Walk on Fire (1987)	Deep (1989)	Live in Voodoo, Belfast (2020)

Deep is the third studio album by Northern Irish band Silent Running, released by Atlantic in 1989.

== Background ==
Deep was Silent Running's second album for Atlantic and showed the band shift towards a more rock-orientated sound. Drummer Ian Gault performed on most of the album and co-wrote seven of the tracks, but he left the band over musical differences before recording was completed. The band were satisfied with Deep, believing it to be their best work and were hopeful that it would achieve commercial success, particularly in the US. "Local Hero" was issued as a promotional single in the US. The band were scheduled to shoot a music video for the song in January 1990, but this did not materialise.

== Critical reception ==
Professional ratings
Review scores
Source	Rating
AllMusic	4/5 stars
Hi-Fi News & Record Review	A:1

Upon its release, Guy Henderson of the Torquay Herald Express felt that, with Deep, Silent Running "prove themselves a valuable commodity, putting a hard edge onto some first class songs". He described the band as "a good prospect to watch for in the future" and picked "Deep in the Heart of Nowhere" as "the best of ten top-quality tracks". Hi-Fi News & Record Review considered it "state-of-the-art wall-of-sound music which should endear this fine Irish trio to American ears" and noted the album's "wonderful melodies, plenty of gloss but with a surprisingly 'live' feel".

Eamon Carr of the Evening Herald wrote, "Silent Running's new album is certainly noisy. At times it's naggingly familiar. A bit like Big Country imitating U2 jamming on Cactus World News covers, though the songs are slightly better than C.W.N.'s." Sunday Life noted there were "no surprises" on the album, "just a professional refining of their sound for the American stadium market" with "singalong anthems" and "squealing guitar solos". The reviewer added, "All fine and dandy as far as it goes, but it lacks any real character. Hundreds of bands are ploughing the same furrow, and enough are doing it better to leave Silent Running superfluous to requirements."

== Track listing ==
All tracks are written by Peter Gamble, Richard Collett, Tony Scott and Ian Gault, except where noted.

No.	Title	Writer(s)	Length
1.	"Deep in the Heart of Nowhere"	Gamble, Collett, Scott	4:13
2.	"Everything Your Heart Desires"	Gamble, Collett, Scott	4:06
3.	"Angel of Mercy"	Gamble, Collett, Scott	4:17
4.	"Strength of our Love"		4:35
5.	"When Will I Learn?"		4:28
6.	"Flame of Love"		4:54
7.	"Sunshine in the Rain"		4:33
8.	"Local Hero"		4:48
9.	"Deliverance"		4:37
10.	"Something So Wrong"		4:44

== Personnel ==
Silent Running

- Peter Gamble – vocals, guitar
- Tony Scott – guitar
- Richard Collett – bass

Additional musicians

- Adrian Lee – keyboards
- Paul Rocks – keyboards
- Clive Gates – additional keyboards
- Frankie LaRocka – drums
- Ian Gault – drums
- Joe Bonadio – percussion
- Steve Sidelnyk – percussion
- Carol Godden – backing vocals
- Leslie Ritter – backing vocals
- Amy Fradon – backing vocals
- Adrian Baker – backing vocals

Production

- Silent Running – production (tracks 1–4)
- Peter Denenberg – production (tracks 1–4), engineering (tracks 1–4), remixing (tracks 6–8)
- Frankie LaRocka – production (tracks 1–4), remixing (tracks 6–8)
- Tom Leinbach – assistant engineering (tracks 1–4)
- John Eden – production (tracks 5–10)
- Sarah Jarman – tape operator

Other

- Bill Smith Studio – design
- Andrew Douglas/The Douglas Brothers – photography
