= The Sanctuary (Derby) =

Protected area in Derby, England

Coordinates: 52.912°N 1.443°W

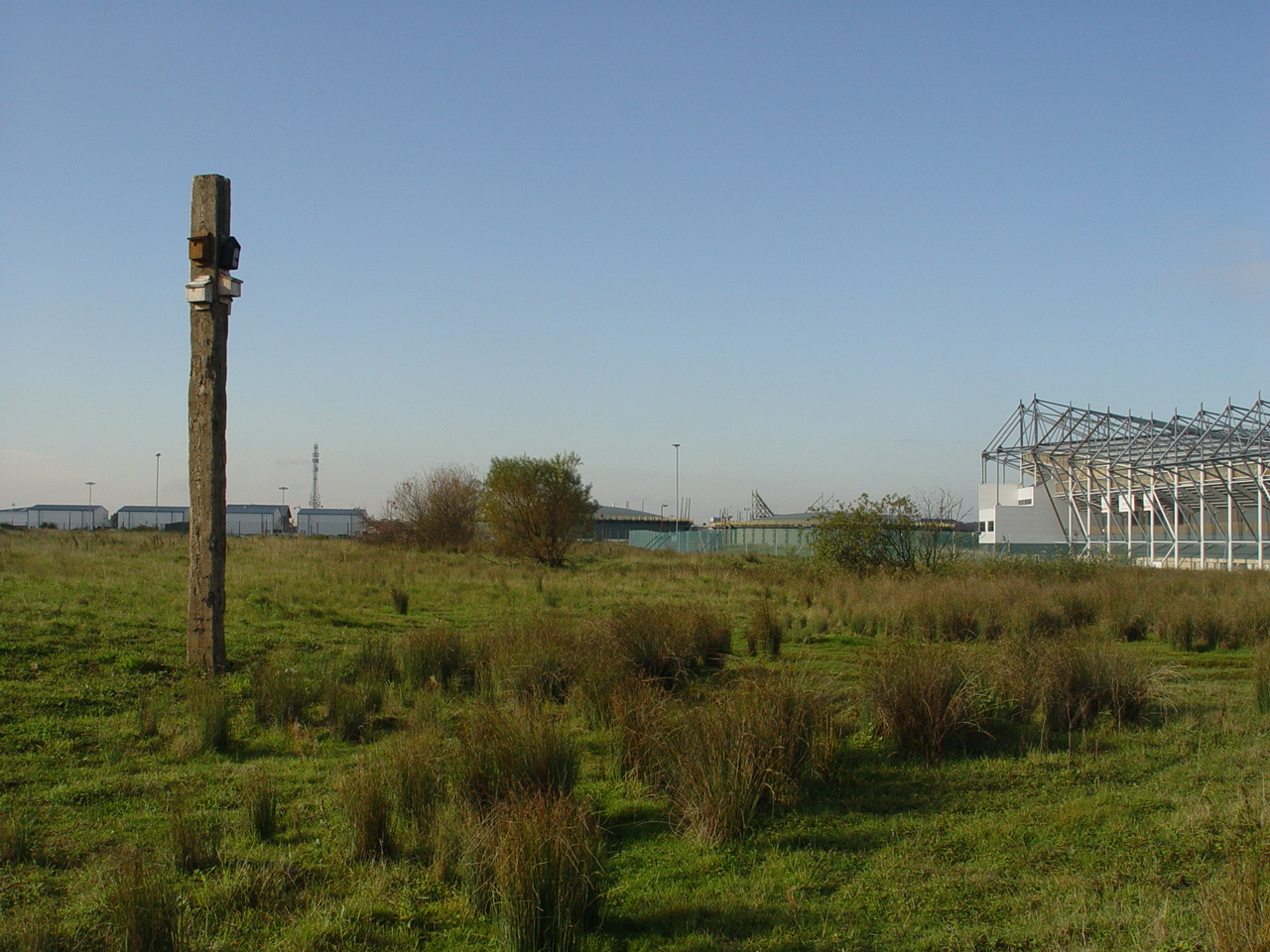
Open mosaic habitat at The Sanctuary Bird Reserve, Pride Park, Derby, prior to destruction for a cycle race track in 2014. Pride Park Football Stadium is in background.

The Sanctuary is a bird and wildlife sanctuary and designated local nature reserve (LNR) located on Pride Park in the city of Derby, England. It is on a twelve hectare site on the west bank of the River Derwent, adjacent to Pride Park Stadium and Derby Arena. Controversial plans by the local council owners to build a closed circuit cycle race track over part of the local nature reserve would have set a national precedent, potentially exposing all LNRs in England to harmful development., but were withdrawn in 2014 following widespread opposition and in the face of legal action and a judicial review of the planning decision.

== History ==
Heavily contaminated from its former use as a gas works, the land had been designated a "Site of Interest for Nature Conservation" in the master plan by Derby City Council. Part of the site was used in 2003 to safely encapsulate contaminated material removed from other areas of Pride Park, but in 2001 the site was found to be home to ground nesting birds and passage migrants and a plan was created to protect their grassland habitat and to encourage their nesting by creating 'the city's first bird reserve'.

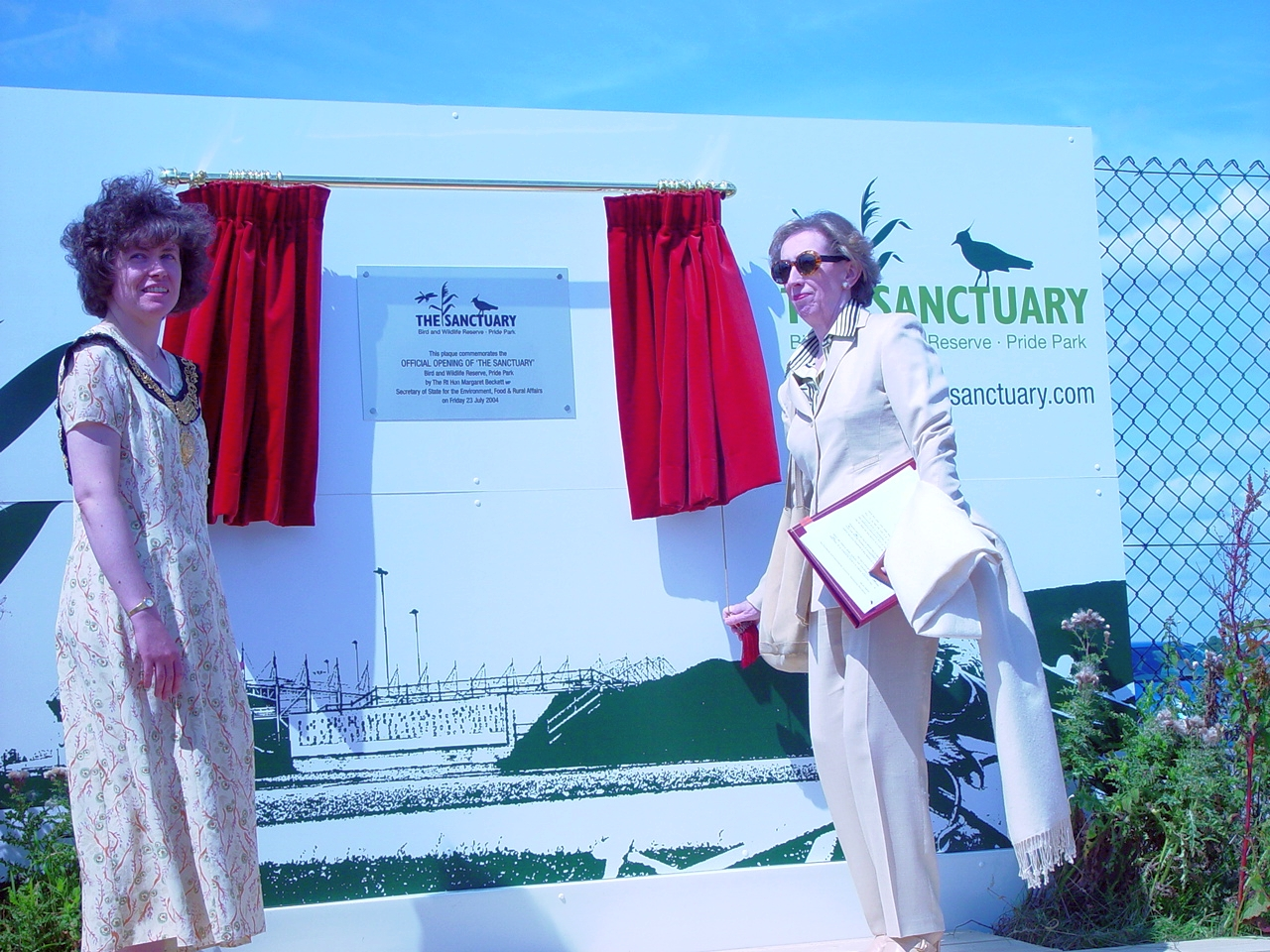
Margaret Beckett MP and the Mayor of Derby, Cllr Ruth Skelton, at launch of The Sanctuary Bird Reserve, Derby July 2004

The Sanctuary Bird and Wildlife Reserve was formally launched in July 2004 by the Secretary of State for the Environment, Margaret Beckett MP, alongside the Mayor of Derby. The site is now home to breeding skylarks, reed buntings and lapwings, all birds considered significant under the UK Biodiversity Action Plan, with additional habitat created for breeding sand martins and little ringed plovers.

The Sanctuary is not an open access area, but four viewing points are provided on the perimeter for the public. In 2005 The Sanctuary received both a Green Apple Award, and a Green Infrastructure Award from the East Midlands Regional Assembly. Facilities include ramped access for disabled people. In 2006 it was designated a Local Nature Reserve.

In February 2005 a Dartford warbler spent six weeks at The Sanctuary, attracting large numbers of bird watchers. It had not been seen in Derbyshire since a pair were shot at Melbourne Common in the winter of 1840.

== Cycle track controversy ==
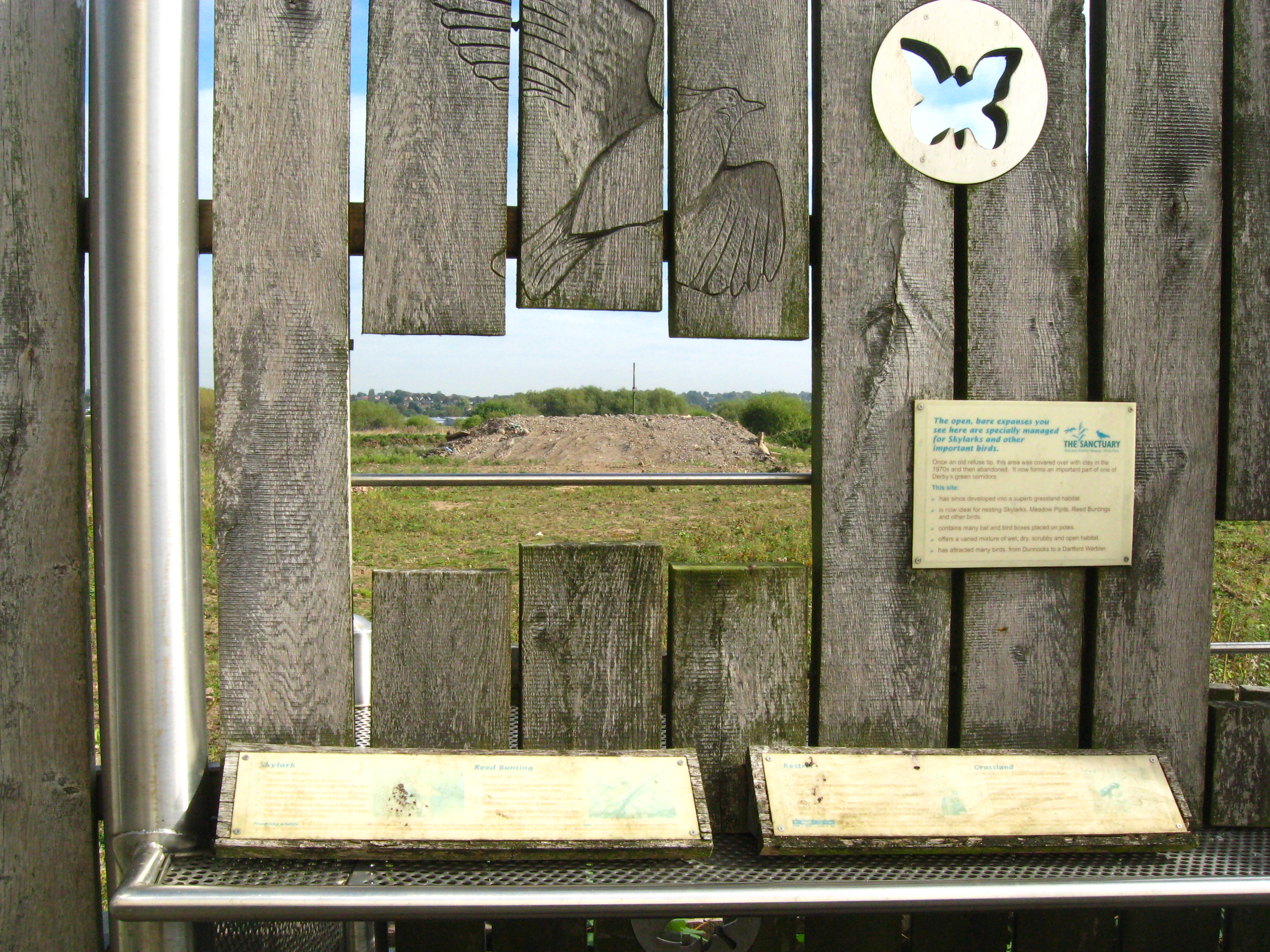
Rubble mounds left behind on The Sanctuary LNR, Derby, following the abandoning of plans in 2014 by Derby City Council to construct a closed circuit cycle race track on top of the bird reserve.

In March 2012, Derby City Council approved plans to build a velodrome (later called Derby Arena) on a former landfill site adjacent to The Sanctuary. In connection with the development, it subsequently also proposed to build an outdoor closed circuit cycle race track on part of the local nature reserve, a plan that was opposed by a coalition of 15 local wildlife groups including the Derbyshire Ornithological Society and Derbyshire Wildlife Trust.

Concerns were raised in local and national newspapers that the council's actions would 'set a dangerous national precedent' with implications for all of the country's designated Local Nature Reserves, exposing them to development pressures. Simon Barnes, chief sportswriter at The Times, described the actions as 'possibly illegal' and described British Cycling's support for the closed circuit cycle track as akin to a “cyclist running a red light.”'. One conservation organisation took out judicial review proceedings against Derby City Council, initially stating:

This would be the first case in the country where a Local Authority, having given one of its own wildlife sites Local Nature Reserve status, then goes on to destroy a significant part of it without mitigation. We fear LNRs in other regions could then also be seen as fair game for all sorts of inappropriate development.

— T. Birch, Derbyshire Wildlife Trust

Television naturalist Chris Packham described Derby council's plans as "a vile act of wanton vandalism". However a number of voices were raised which expressed support for development of a closed circuit cycle track on top of the bird reserve. During the controversy, the breeding success of little ringed plover at The Sanctuary was publicly announced in July 2013.

Derby City Council approved the cycle track in February 2014. Work on the site was halted by court order later that month, following legal action by Derbyshire Wildlife Trust and initiation of judicial review proceedings. As a result, the council decided to scrap their plans in March 2014, citing that it was 'not in taxpayers' interests to continue', later revealing it had spent £147,000 on the aborted plans. A year after construction work had halted, Derby council announced in 2015 that it could not afford to repair the damage it had done to the bird reserve.
