= From A to B (New Musik album) =

Studio album by New Musik
- Released: 18 April 1980
- Recorded: 1979–80
- Genres: Synthpop, new wave
- Label: GTO
- Producer: Tony Mansfield

New Musik chronology
From A to B (1980)	Anywhere (1981)

Singles from From A To B
- 1. "Straight Lines" Released: 10 August 1979; 2. "Living by Numbers" Released: 4 November 1979; 3. "This World of Water" Released: April 1980; 4. "Sanctuary" Released: July 1980

Professional ratings
Review scores
Source	Rating
Allmusic	4.5/5 stars
Smash Hits	8/10

From A to B is the debut album from New Musik released on 18 April 1980. The CD version was first released on the GTO label in 1994 with three bonus tracks. A digitally remastered version called From A to B...Plus was released in 2000 and contained six bonus tracks.

Record World reviewed the single "Straight Lines" in the 1 March 1980 edition of the publication, writing that "Tony Mansfield's distinctive lead vocals highlight this outstanding electronic dancer with an irresistible keyboard riff."

== Track listing ==
=== LP: GTLP 041 ===
==== From A ====
1. "Straight Lines" – 5:12
2. "Sanctuary" – 4:12
3. "A Map of You" – 3:50
4. "Science" – 3:20
5. "On Islands" – 4:24

==== To B ====
1. "This World of Water" – 3:37
2. "Living by Numbers" – 3:28
3. "Dead Fish (Don't Swim Home)" – 5:24
4. "Adventures" – 3:52
5. "The Safe Side" – 3:09

=== 1994 - GTO Records CD: GTO 474616-2 ===
1. "Straight Lines" – 5:12
2. "Sanctuary" – 4:12
3. "A Map of You" – 3:50
4. "Science" – 3:20
5. "On Islands" – 4:24
6. "This World of Water" – 3:37
7. "Living by Numbers" – 3:28
8. "Dead Fish (Don't Swim Home)" – 5:24
9. "Adventures" – 3:52
10. "The Safe Side" – 3:09
11. "Missing Persons" – 5:40
12. "She's a Magazine" – 4:16
13. "Sad Films" – 2:41

=== Edsel 2000 CD Remaster (EDCD 678) ===
1. "Straight Lines" – 5:12
2. "Sanctuary" – 4:12
3. "A Map of You" – 3:50
4. "Science" – 3:20
5. "On Islands" – 4:24
6. "This World of Water" – 3:37
7. "Living by Numbers" – 3:28
8. "Dead Fish (Don't Swim Home)" – 5:24
9. "Adventures" – 3:52
10. "The Safe Side" – 3:09
11. "Sad Films" – 2:41
12. "Missing Persons" – 5:45
13. "Tell Me Something New" – 2:09
14. "She's a Magazine" – 4:21
15. "Chik Musik" – 2:47
16. "Magazine Musik" – 1:02

== Personnel ==
New Musik

- Tony Mansfield – vocals, guitars, keyboards
- Tony Hibbert – bass
- Clive Gates – keyboards
- Phil Towner – drums, percussion

Technical

- Produced By Tony Mansfield
- Recorded At TMC Studios
- Chief Engineer Peter Hammond
