= Clive Gates =

British musician (born 1956)

Clive Gates (born 11 March 1956, Westminster, London) is a British musician who was the keyboardist and synthesizer player of the synthpop band New Musik from 1979 until 1982, replacing original member Nick Straker who left to form the Nick Straker Band. Gates remained as a member of the New Musik until they split up.

Gates is a classically trained pianist. He knew Tony Mansfield in 1972, performing with him in a T. Rex and King Crimson oriented band called Reeman Zeegus.

He also played keyboards on Miguel Bosé's 1987 album, XXX, and for Silent Running on the album Deep (1989) and on Ana Torroja's Puntos Cardinales album (1997).

== Instruments ==
- Wurlitzer, Mini-Korg 700S synthesizer (pre-New Musik)
- Logan String synthesizer (pre-New Musik)
- Prophet 5 synthesizer
- Mini-Korg 700S synthesizer
