= Walk on Fire (album) =

Studio album by Silent Running
- Released: 1987
- Genres: New wave, rock
- Length: 35:23
- Label: Atlantic
- Producers: Terry Brown, Andy Richards

Silent Running chronology
Shades of Liberty (1984)	Walk on Fire (1987)	Deep (1989)

Walk on Fire is the second studio album from Belfast New Wave/rock band Silent Running, released in 1987.

== Background ==
After the commercial failure of the band's 1984 debut album Shades of Liberty and its three singles, the band were to record their second album for EMI Records. However, the 1985 single "No Faith is Blind" failed to become a commercial success. Despite massive airplay and appearances on television shows across the musical spectrum (including 'Cheggar's Plays Pop') the single resulted in the band being dropped by EMI.

In a major coup the band were picked up by Atlantic Records, becoming the first British or Irish act to join the roster of this legendary American record label.

A total of two singles were released from the album; "Sanctuary" and "Heartland", which both failed to make enough impact to chart, causing the band to not make the elusive breakthrough that was hoped.

"Sanctuary" was released in both the UK and America. The artwork for the single used the main artwork for the album. "Heartland" was released during 1988 in the UK only although it was also released as an American promotional single. The single featured non-related artwork to the album.

Following the commercial failure of the album, the band would work on their next album for Atlantic Records, the 1989 album Deep.

== Recording ==
The album was produced and engineered by British-Canadian producer Terry Brown, although two tracks, "Walk on Fire" and "Till Tomorrow Comes", were produced by Andy Richards and engineered by Tony Phillips. All tracks are original, where the music was written by all four members of the band, with the lyrics being written solely by vocalist Peter Gamble.

Keyboardist Alex White left in 1985 to work with Joan Armatrading, resulting in the band relying on session musicians such as Ian Curnow (Talk Talk) to record keyboards on the album.

== Release ==
Walk on Fire was released by Atlantic Records in North America, Europe and Australia. The album was made available on all streaming platforms by Warner Music on 23 July 2021.

== Promotion ==
A music video was created for the single "Sanctuary".

A European mini-poster advertisement for the album was issued for magazines.

== Track listing ==
No.	Title	Writer(s)	Length
1.	"Sanctuary"	Richard Collett, Ian Gault, Peter Gamble, Tony Scott	5:34
2.	"Heartland"	Richard Collett, Ian Gault, Peter Gamble, Tony Scott	4:42
3.	"The Hunger"	Richard Collett, Ian Gault, Peter Gamble, Tony Scott	5:05
4.	"Heartbreak City"	Richard Collett, Ian Gault, Peter Gamble, Tony Scott	4:18
5.	"Walk on Fire"	Richard Collett, Ian Gault, Peter Gamble, Tony Scott	3:50
6.	"Winds of War"	Richard Collett, Ian Gault, Peter Gamble, Tony Scott	4:21
7.	"Under Your Skin"	Richard Collett, Ian Gault, Peter Gamble, Tony Scott	3:39
8.	"Till Tomorrow Comes"	Richard Collett, Ian Gault, Peter Gamble, Tony Scott	3:54

== Critical reception ==
Professional ratings
Review scores
Source	Rating
Allmusic	3/5 stars

== Personnel ==
=== Silent Running ===
- Peter Gamble - vocals, lyrics
- Tony Scott - guitar
- Richard Collett - bass
- Ian Gault - drums, drum programming

=== Additional personnel ===
- Terry Brown - Producer, Engineer
- Andy Richards - Producer on "Walk on Fire" and "Till Tomorrow Comes", Keyboards
- Tony Phillips - Engineer on "Walk on Fire" and "Till Tomorrow Comes"
- James Reynolds - Assistant Engineer
- Ren Swan - Assistant Engineer
- Trevor Hallesy - Engineer
- Ian Curnow - Keyboards
- Clive Griffin, Helena Spriggs, Linda Taylor, Shirley Lewis, Tessa Niles - Backing Vocals
