= New Musik =

English synth-pop group

- Origin: London, England
- Genres: Synth-pop; new wave
- Years active: 1977–1982
- Labels: Edsel; Epic; GTO; Sony
- Past members: Tony Mansfield; Clive Gates; Cliff Venner; Tony Hibbert; Phil Towner

New Musik were an English synth-pop group active from 1977 to 1982. Led by Tony Mansfield, they achieved success in 1980 with the top 20 single "Living by Numbers" which was followed up with the top 40 hits "This World of Water", "Sanctuary" and hit album From A to B.

== History ==
New Musik formed in 1977 in London, growing out of a casual band of South London school friends who jammed together under the name End of the World. The lead vocalist and frontman for the band was songwriter and record producer Tony Mansfield, with bassist Tony Hibbert and drummer Phil Towner, who were all at that time also members of the Nick Straker Band. The line-up was completed in 1979 with the introduction of keyboardist Clive Gates.

Their debut single, "Straight Lines", was released by GTO Records in September 1979 and New Musik performed the single on the BBC TV pop programme Top of the Pops. "Straight Lines" received airplay on BBC Radio 1 from guest DJ Frank Zappa, and also on WPIX-FM in New York.

Their debut album From A to B came out in April 1980, and reached the Top 40 in the UK Albums Chart. The album contained four hit singles: "Straight Lines", "This World of Water", "Sanctuary" and their most commercially successful single "Living by Numbers". In 1980, Casio used the latter track as part of a TV advertising campaign for its digital calculators, latching on to the phrase "Such a digital lifetime" used in one of the verses.

Touring the UK in 1980, New Musik performed at May Balls in both Oxford and Cambridge with Elvis Costello; and the Rotterdam New Pop 1980 festival in the Netherlands. In 1981, the band played a second UK tour and were featured in a 1981 documentary film, Listen to London, performing "Straight Lines" and "This World of Water".

The band's second album, Anywhere, was released in 1981 and reached No. 68 in the UK. The album's single releases, "Luxury" and "While You Wait", did not chart. The band performed "Luxury" on Multi-Coloured Swap Shop. In 1981, a compilation album, Sanctuary, was released exclusively in the United States, consisting of five tracks from From A to B and seven from Anywhere. Previous to this release, there had also been a four-song 10" vinyl "Straight Lines" released by CBS Records in the U.S. as part of their short-lived Epic 'Nu-Disk' series, which also included The Clash's, Black Market Clash. Towner and Hibbert departed, and Mansfield and Gates cut the next album with the assistance of studio musicians.

After the demise of GTO Records, the band released their third and final album, Warp, in 1982 which was more experimental than their previous releases. Warp was almost entirely electronic, and one of the first albums to be recorded primarily with digital samplers and emulators. It featured a synthesized version of the Beatles' hit song "All You Need Is Love", alongside an identically titled track of their own. New Musik disbanded shortly after its release that year.

Ondarock critic Marco Bercella expressed bewilderment over New Musik's failure to achieve mass popularity akin to peers such as the Human League, OMD and Depeche Mode. Bercella wrote that the group "belong to the very first wave of British synth-pop bands, and carry just as distinctive a trademark as the others – if not more so". Mansfield went on to achieve success in the field of production with After the Fire, a-ha, Aztec Camera, The B-52's, The Damned, Captain Sensible, Naked Eyes, Mari Wilson, Jean Paul Gaultier, Miguel Bosé, and Ana Torroja.

From A to B and Anywhere were released on CD in 1994, and again in 2001 and 2011, remastered and with bonus tracks. Warp was also released with bonus tracks on CD for the first time in 2001, exclusively in Japan. Warp's first CD release in the UK came in January 2011 on the Cherry Red label (CDLEMD 182).

== Members ==
=== Last line up before disbandment ===
- Tony Mansfield (1977–1982)
- Clive Gates (c. 1979–1982)
- Cliff Venner (1982)

=== Other members ===
- Tony Hibbert (1977–81)
- Phil Towner (1977–81)

== Discography ==
=== Studio albums ===
Year	Album	UK
1980	From A to B	35
1981	Anywhere	68
1982	Warp	—

=== Compilation albums ===
Year	Album	Comments
1980	Straight Lines	Included their first UK singles, "Straight Lines" and "Living by Numbers", and their B-sides, "On Islands" and "Sad Films", in Epic Records' short-lived Nu-Disk 10" vinyl format.
1981	Sanctuary	US only compilation containing five tracks from From A to B and seven from Anywhere.

=== Singles ===
Year	Song	Peak chart positions					Album
Year	Song	UK	AUS	FRA	IRE	NL	Album
1979	"Straight Lines"	53	—	—	—	—	From A to B
1980	"Living by Numbers"	13	55	—	12	—	From A to B
1980	"This World of Water"	31	—	—	18	23	From A to B
1980	"On Islands"	—	—	26	—	—	From A to B
1980	"Sanctuary"	31	—	—	—	44	From A to B
1981	"Luxury"	—	—	—	—	—	Anywhere
1981	"While You Wait"	—	—	—	—	—	Anywhere
1981	"The Planet Doesn't Mind"	—	—	—	—	—	Warp
1982	"All You Need Is Love"	—	—	—	—	—	Warp
1982	"Warp"	—	—	—	—	—	Warp
"—" denotes releases that did not chart or were not released in that country.

== See also ==
- List of new wave artists
- List of synth-pop artists
- List of performers on Top of the Pops
