= Tony Mansfield =

English songwriter, musician and record producer

- Born: Anthony Charles Mansfield; 19 January 1955 (age 71); London, England
- Occupations: Record producer; songwriter; musician
- Years active: 1970s – c. 2001
- Musical career
- Genres: Synth-pop; rock
- Label: 100% Love
- Formerly of: New Musik

Anthony Charles Mansfield (born 19 January 1955) is an English songwriter, musician and record producer. He was the frontman of the synth-pop band New Musik, which he formed in 1977. Mansfield's music features innovative use of synthesizers and electronic production techniques.

== Early life ==
Anthony Charles Mansfield was born on 19 January 1955 in Wimbledon, London and grew up in Clapham, London, and attended Spencer Park School in Wandsworth. After leaving school, he worked briefly in the art department of Decca Records. In 1977, Mansfield formed the synth-pop band New Musik, serving as the lead vocalist, guitarist, keyboardist, and primary songwriter.

=== Early work ===
Mansfield was the main songwriter and producer for New Musik, a synth-pop band that performed from 1979 to 1982. Following their debut hit single "Straight Lines" in 1979, the band had three further UK Top 40 hits in 1980 ("This World of Water", "Sanctuary" and "Living by Numbers"), and released three albums: From A to B (1980), Anywhere (1981) and Warp (1982), after which the band disbanded. The group also released a compilation album for the United States in 1981 known as Sanctuary which consisted of tracks from the first two albums.

== Productions and collaborations ==
Mansfield's career as a freelance producer began in the late 1970s, before his time with New Musik. After the band's dissolution, he shifted entirely to production, using the Fairlight CMI throughout the 1980s for both production and pre-production.

=== 1980s ===
During the 1980s period, he worked on successful albums and singles for a variety of artists. His collaborations included Naked Eyes debut album Burning Bridges (1983), which included the US Top 10 hit "Always Something There to Remind Me" and Captain Sensible, with whom he co-wrote hits such as "Glad It's All Over", "There Are More Snakes Than Ladders", and "One Christmas Catalogue".

In 1982, Mansfield formed the short-lived group Planet Ha Ha with his younger brother Lee Mansfield and Naked Eyes musician Rob Fisher. The group recorded the single "Home", whose references to the film E.T. the Extra-Terrestrial prompted legal objections from MCA. The single was withdrawn, and the album remains unreleased.

One of his early works was on A-ha's debut album, Hunting High and Low (1984). Although his original production of "Take On Me" was later re-recorded and remixed by Alan Tarney, Mansfield's influence on the album's sound was significant, helping to shape the band's signature synth-driven pop style.

Mansfield also contributed to albums, including XXX by Miguel Bosé, Showpeople by Mari Wilson, and Bouncing Off the Satellites by the B-52's. Additionally, he worked with Vicious Pink, Jean Paul Gaultier, and After the Fire.

=== 1990-2001, professional hiatus ===
Throughout the 1990s, Mansfield began collaborating with Japanese artists, arranging the songs "Kotori" and "Slowly" for Mimori Yusa's 1994 album Aluhi-Halenohi, with the latter song featuring New Musik bassist Tony Hibbert. He also provided backing vocals for the Yukihiro Takahashi song "Memory Without Consequence", included on his album A Ray of Hope (1998).

In 1994, Mansfield produced So in Love with You by Duke, which reached No. 3 that year in the Netherlands and No. 1 on the US Billboard dance chart in 1997. That same year, he produced the debut album Puntos Cardinales for Ana Torroja.

In 2000, Mansfield produced "My Star" for the Latvian band Brainstorm, which went on to place third in the 2000 Eurovision Song Contest. The following year, he continued his collaboration with Brainstorm, producing their 2001 album Online.

Mansfield's work has featured in various television productions, advertisements and films including Earth Girls Are Easy (1988), Romy and Michele's High School Reunion (1997) and Hysterical Blindness (2002).

== Musical style and influence ==
Mansfield's music is distinguished by his pioneering use of synthesizers and electronic instruments, including the Korg 700s, Roland VP-330, Prophet 5, and Fairlight CMI.

His production style combines synthesized instruments with conventional studio performances. Discussing his production work for Mari Wilson's "Just What I Always Wanted", Wilson recalled Mansfield layering electronic instruments over her live band arrangements.
