= List of UK top-ten singles in 1982 =

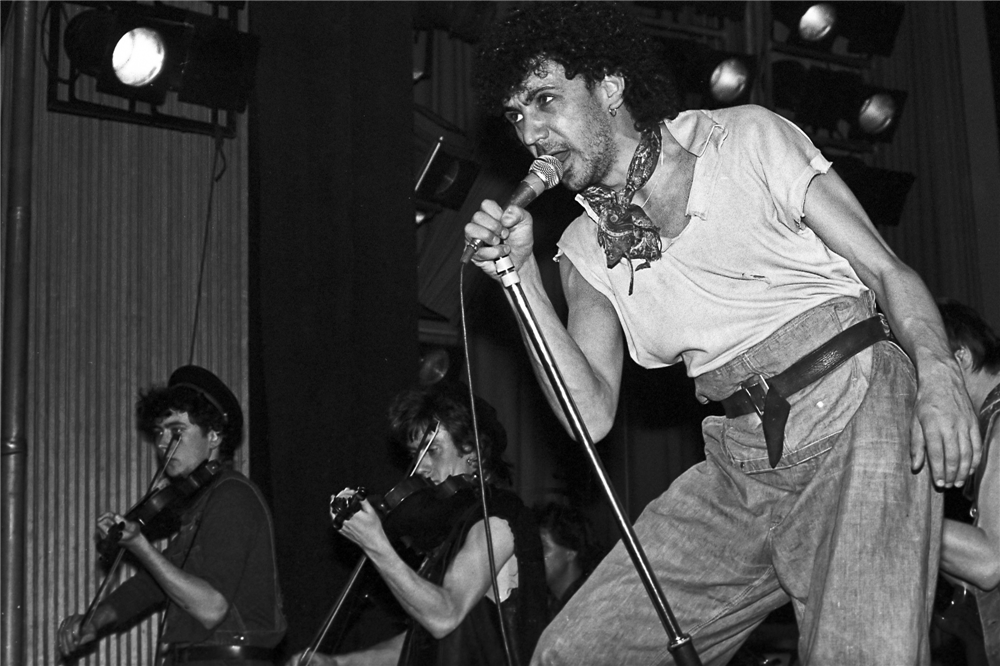
Dexys Midnight Runners achieved the best-selling single of 1982 with "Come On Eileen", which spent four weeks at number-one. The group had a second top 10 hit later in the year with their cover of Van Morrison's "Jackie Wilson Said (I'm in Heaven When You Smile)", which peaked at number five.

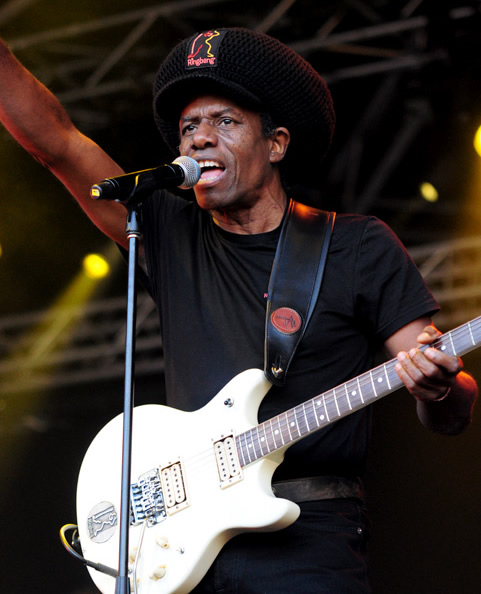
Eddy Grant scored a solo UK number-one single this year with "I Don't Wanna Dance", which topped the chart in November for three weeks. He had previously reached number-one as a member of The Equals in 1968 with "Baby, Come Back".

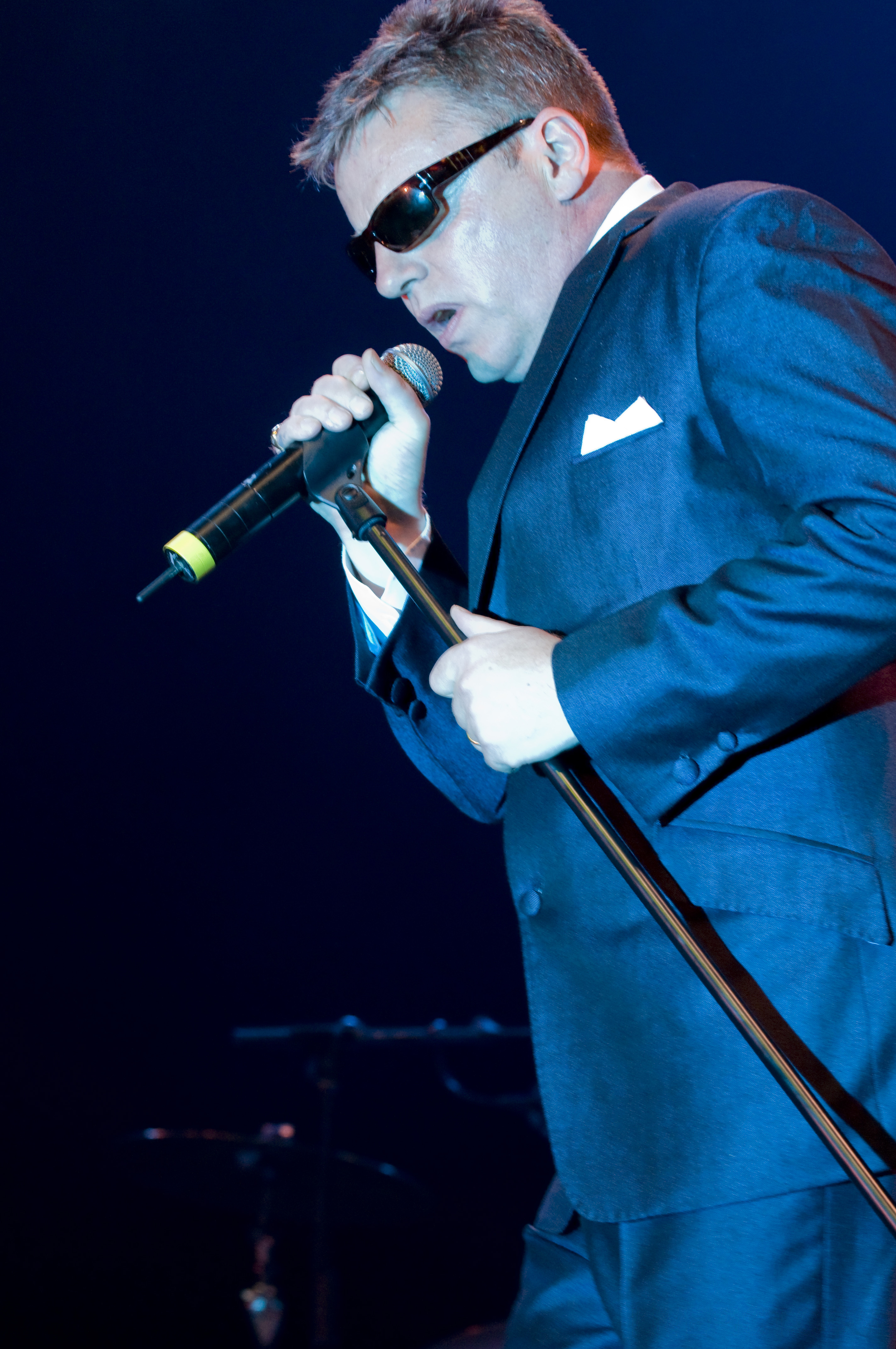
Suggs (pictured in 2008) and his band Madness had four singles in the UK top 10 in 1982, including their only number-one hit, "House of Fun".

The UK Singles Chart is one of many music charts compiled by the Official Charts Company that calculates the best-selling singles of the week in the United Kingdom. Before 2004, the chart was only based on the sales of physical singles. This list shows singles that peaked in the Top 10 of the UK Singles Chart during 1982, as well as singles which peaked in 1981 and 1983 but were in the top 10 in 1982. The entry date is when the single appeared in the top 10 for the first time (week ending, as published by the Official Charts Company, which is six days after the chart is announced).

One-hundred and fifty-four singles were in the top ten in 1982. Ten singles from 1981 remained in the top 10 for several weeks at the beginning of the year, while "A Winter's Tale" by David Essex, "Best Years of Our Lives" by Modern Romance and "You Can't Hurry Love" by Phil Collins were both released in 1982 but did not reach their peak until 1983. "Ant Rap" by Adam and the Ants, "I'll Find My Way Home" by Jon and Vangelis, "It Must Be Love" by Madness, "The Land of Make Believe" by Bucks Fizz and "Mirror Mirror (Mon Amour)" by Dollar were the singles from 1981 to reach their peak in 1982. Thirty-three artists scored multiple entries in the top 10 in 1982. Bananarama, Culture Club, Hall & Oates, Iron Maiden and Wham! were among the many artists who achieved their first UK charting top 10 single in 1982.

The 1981 Christmas number-one, "Don't You Want Me" by The Human League, remained at number-one for the first two weeks of 1982. The first new number-one single of the year was "The Land of Make Believe" by Bucks Fizz, who won the Eurovision Song Contest for the United Kingdom the previous year. Overall, twenty-two different singles peaked at number-one in 1982, with Bucks Fizz and The Jam (2) having the most singles hit that position.

== Background ==
=== Multiple entries ===
One-hundred and fifty-four singles charted in the top 10 in 1982, with one-hundred and forty-six singles reaching their peak this year.

Thirty-three artists scored multiple entries in the top 10 in 1982. The Jam, Madness, Paul McCartney and Shakin' Stevens shared the record for most top 10 hits in 1982 with four hit singles each.

Culture Club were one of a number of artists with two top-ten entries, including the number-one single "Do You Really Want to Hurt Me". Bow Wow Wow, Dollar, Hall & Oates, Kool and the Gang and Stevie Wonder were among the other artists who had multiple top 10 entries in 1982.

=== Chart debuts ===
Fifty-eight artists achieved their first top 10 single in 1982, either as a lead or featured artist. Of these, seven went on to record another hit single that year: Bow Wow Wow, Culture Club, Fun Boy Three, Hall & Oates, Japan, The Kids from "Fame" and Yazoo. ABC, Bananarama and Shalamar all had three other entries in their breakthrough year.

The following table (collapsed on desktop site) does not include acts who had previously charted as part of a group and secured their first top 10 solo single.

Artist	Number of top 10s	First entry	Chart position	Other entries
Kraftwerk	1	"The Model"/"Computer Love"	1	—
Foreigner	1	"Waiting for a Girl Like You"	8	—
Meat Loaf	1	"Dead Ringer for Love"	5	—
Christopher Cross	1	"Arthur's Theme (Best That You Can Do)"	7	—
Mobiles	1	"Drowning in Berlin"	9	—
XTC	1	"Senses Working Overtime"	10	—
The J. Geils Band	1	"Centerfold"	3	—
Hall & Oates	2	"I Can't Go for That (No Can Do)"	8	"Maneater" (6)
Fun Boy Three	2	"It Ain't What You Do (It's the Way That You Do It)"	4	"Really Saying Something" (5)
Bananarama	3	"It Ain't What You Do (It's the Way That You Do It)"	4	"Really Saying Something" (5), "Shy Boy" (4)
Toni Basil	1	"Mickey"	2	—
Iron Maiden	1	"Run to the Hills"	7	—
Goombay Dance Band	1	"Seven Tears"	1	—
Bow Wow Wow	2	"Go Wild in the Country"	7	"I Want Candy" (9)
ABC	3	"Poison Arrow"	6	"All of My Heart" (5), "The Look of Love" (4)
The Associates	1	"Party Fears Two"	9	—
Japan	2	"Ghosts"	5	"I Second That Emotion" (9)
Pigbag	1	"Papa's Got a Brand New Pigbag"	3	—
Bardo	1	"One Step Further"	2	—
Shakatak	1	"Night Birds"	9	—
Shalamar	3	"I Can Make You Feel Good"	7	"A Night to Remember", "There It Is" (5)
England World Cup Squad 1982	1	"This Time (We'll Get It Right)"/"England, We'll Fly The Flag"	2	—
Ph.D.	1	"I Won't Let You Down"	3	—
Joan Jett & the Blackhearts	1	"I Love Rock 'n' Roll"	4	—
Nicole	1	"A Little Peace"	1	—
Scotland World Cup Squad 1982	1	"We Have a Dream"	5	—
Yazoo	2	"Only You"	2	"Don't Go" (3)
Patrice Rushen	1	"Forget Me Nots"	8	—
Junior	1	"Mama Used to Say"	7	—
Charlene	1	"I've Never Been to Me"	1	—
Kid Creole and the Coconuts	1	"I'm a Wonderful Thing, Baby"	4	"Annie, I'm Not Your Daddy" (2), "Stool Pigeon" (7)
Captain Sensible	1	"Happy Talk"	1	—
Steve Miller Band	1	"Abracadabra"	2	—
Irene Cara	1	"Fame"	1	—
Trio	1	"Da Da Da"	2	—
Natasha	1	"Iko Iko"	10	—
Survivor	1	"Eye of the Tiger"	1	—
Boys Town Gang	1	"Can't Take My Eyes Off You"	4	—
The Kids from "Fame"	2	"Hi Fidelity"	5	"Starmaker" (3)
Valerie Landsburg	1	"Hi Fidelity"	5	—
Toto Coelo	1	"I Eat Cannibals (Part 1)"	8	—
Rockers Revenge	1	"Walking on Sunshine"	4	—
Donnie Calvin	1	"Walking on Sunshine"	4	—
Grandmaster Flash and the Furious Five	1	"The Message"	8	—
David Christie	1	"Saddle Up"	9	—
Musical Youth	1	"Pass the Dutchie"	1	—
Fat Larry's Band	1	"Zoom"	2	—
Evelyn King	1	"Love Come Down"	7	—
Culture Club	2	"Do You Really Want to Hurt Me"	1	"Time (Clock of the Heart)" (3)
Mari Wilson	1	"Just What I Always Wanted"	8	—
Pinkees	1	"Danger Games"	8	—
Tears for Fears	1	"Mad World"	3	—
Barry Manilow	1	"I Wanna Do It With You"	8	—
Clannad	1	"Theme from Harry's Game"	5	—
Wham!	1	"Young Guns (Go for It)"	3	—
Blancmange	1	"Living on the Ceiling"	7	—
Renée and Renato	1	"Save Your Love"	1	—
A Flock of Seagulls	1	"Wishing (If I Had a Photograph of You)"	10	—

Notes

Adrian Gurvitz was a member of the rock trio The Gun who scored a top 10 hit with "Race with the Devil" in November 1968, peaking at number 8. "Classic" is his only solo top ten single to date. Adam and the Ants disbanded in 1982 and lead singer Adam Ant had his first single independent of the band, reaching number one with "Goody Two Shoes".

Midge Ure was in the line-up of various groups, including Thin Lizzy and Visage before his solo career began in 1982. His cover of "No Regrets" charted at number 9.

=== Songs from films ===
Original songs from various films entered the top 10 throughout the year. These included "Arthur's Theme (Best That You Can Do)" (Arthur), "Fame" (Fame), "Eye of the Tiger" (Rocky III) and "Why" (Soup for One).

=== Best-selling singles ===
Dexys Midnight Runners had the best-selling single of the year with "Come On Eileen". The single spent nine weeks in the top 10 (including four weeks at number one) and sold over 1.2 million copies and was certified platinum by the BPI. "Fame" by Irene Cara came in second place, selling more than 975,000 copies and losing out by around 225,000 sales. Survivor's "Eye of the Tiger", "The Lion Sleeps Tonight" from Tight Fit and "Do You Really Want to Hurt Me" by Culture Club made up the top five. Singles by Musical Youth, Eddy Grant, Goombay Dance Band, Paul McCartney with Stevie Wonder, and The Jam were also in the top ten best-selling singles of the year.

== Top-ten singles ==
Key

Symbol	Meaning
‡	Single peaked in 1981 but still in chart in 1982.
♦	Single released in 1982 but peaked in 1983.
(#)	Year-end top-ten single position and rank
Entered	The date that the single first appeared in the chart.
Peak	Highest position that the single reached in the UK Singles Chart.

Entered (week ending)	Weeks in top 10	Single	Artist	Peak	Peak reached (week ending)	Weeks at peak
Singles in 1981
5 December 1981	6	"Daddy's Home" ‡	Cliff Richard	2	12 December 1981	4
5 December 1981	8	"Don't You Want Me" ‡	The Human League	1	12 December 1981	5
12 December 1981	6	"It Must Be Love"	Madness	4	9 January 1982	1
12 December 1981	6	"Ant Rap"	Adam and the Ants	3	9 January 1982	1
12 December 1981	4	"Wedding Bells" ‡	Godley & Creme	7	26 December 1981	2
19 December 1981	5	"One of Us" ‡	ABBA	3	19 December 1981	3
19 December 1981	9	"The Land of Make Believe"	Bucks Fizz	1	16 January 1982	2
26 December 1981	6	"I'll Find My Way Home"	Jon and Vangelis	6	23 January 1982	1
26 December 1981	2	"Rock 'n' Roll" ‡	Status Quo	8	26 December 1981	2
26 December 1981	5	"Mirror Mirror"	Dollar	4	16 January 1982	1
Singles in 1982
9 January 1982	5	"Get Down on It"	Kool & the Gang	3	16 January 1982	1
9 January 1982	3	"I Could Be Happy"	Altered Images	7	16 January 1982	1
16 January 1982	6	"The Model"/"Computer Love"	Kraftwerk	1	6 February 1982	1
23 January 1982	5	"Oh Julie"	Shakin' Stevens	1	30 January 1982	1
23 January 1982	5	"Dead Ringer for Love"	Meat Loaf	5	6 February 1982	2
23 January 1982	1	"Waiting for a Girl Like You"	Foreigner	8	23 January 1982	1
23 January 1982	3	"Being Boiled"	The Human League	6	30 January 1982	1
30 January 1982	6	"Golden Brown"	The Stranglers	2	13 February 1982	2
30 January 1982	4	"Arthur's Theme (Best That You Can Do)"	Christopher Cross	7	6 February 1982	2
6 February 1982	5	"Maid of Orleans (The Waltz Joan of Arc)"	Orchestral Manoeuvres in the Dark	4	20 February 1982	1
6 February 1982	2	"Drowning in Berlin"	Mobiles	9	6 February 1982	1
13 February 1982	4	"Town Called Malice"/"Precious" (#10)	The Jam	1	13 February 1982	3
13 February 1982	8	"The Lion Sleeps Tonight" (#4)	Tight Fit	1	6 March 1982	3
20 February 1982	3	"Say Hello, Wave Goodbye"	Soft Cell	3	20 February 1982	1
20 February 1982	1	"Senses Working Overtime"	XTC	10	20 February 1982	1
27 February 1982	4	"Centerfold"	The J. Geils Band	3	27 February 1982	1
27 February 1982	5	"Love Plus One"	Haircut One Hundred	3	13 March 1982	1
27 February 1982	1	"I Can't Go for That (No Can Do)"	Hall & Oates	8	27 February 1982	1
27 February 1982	4	"It Ain't What You Do (It's the Way That You Do It)"	Fun Boy Three with Bananarama	4	13 March 1982	1
27 February 1982	3	"See You"	Depeche Mode	6	13 March 1982	1
6 March 1982	4	"Mickey"	Toni Basil	2	6 March 1982	2
13 March 1982	1	"Run to the Hills"	Iron Maiden	7	13 March 1982	1
13 March 1982	6	"Seven Tears" (#8)	Goombay Dance Band	1	27 March 1982	3
13 March 1982	2	"Go Wild in the Country"	Bow Wow Wow	7	20 March 1982	1
13 March 1982	4	"Poison Arrow"	ABC	6	20 March 1982	2
20 March 1982	5	"Just an Illusion"	Imagination	2	3 April 1982	1
20 March 1982	2	"Classic"	Adrian Gurvitz	8	27 March 1982	1
27 March 1982	3	"Quiéreme Mucho (Yours)"	Julio Iglesias	3	27 March 1982	2
27 March 1982	3	"Layla" ^{[A]}	Derek and the Dominos	4	3 April 1982	1
27 March 1982	2	"Party Fears Two"	The Associates	9	27 March 1982	1
3 April 1982	4	"My Camera Never Lies"	Bucks Fizz	1	17 April 1982	1
3 April 1982	4	"Ain't No Pleasing You"	Chas & Dave	2	17 April 1982	1
3 April 1982	3	"Ghosts"	Japan	5	10 April 1982	1
10 April 1982	3	"More than This"	Roxy Music	6	10 April 1982	2
10 April 1982	4	"Give Me Back My Heart"	Dollar	4	24 April 1982	1
10 April 1982	1	"Have You Ever Been in Love"	Leo Sayer	10	10 April 1982	1
17 April 1982	6	"Ebony and Ivory" (#9)	Paul McCartney & Stevie Wonder	1	24 April 1982	3
17 April 1982	4	"Papa's Got a Brand New Pigbag"	Pigbag	3	24 April 1982	2
17 April 1982	1	"Dear John"	Status Quo	10	17 April 1982	1
24 April 1982	3	"One Step Further" ^{[B]}	Bardo	2	1 May 1982	1
24 April 1982	2	"Blue Eyes"	Elton John	8	24 April 1982	1
24 April 1982	1	"Night Birds"	Shakatak	9	24 April 1982	1
24 April 1982	3	"I Can Make You Feel Good"	Shalamar	7	1 May 1982	1
1 May 1982	3	"This Time (We'll Get It Right)"/"England, We'll Fly The Flag" ^{[C]}	England World Cup Squad 1982	2	8 May 1982	1
1 May 1982	3	"Really Saying Something"	Bananarama with Fun Boy Three	5	1 May 1982	2
1 May 1982	1	"Shirley"	Shakin' Stevens	6	1 May 1982	1
1 May 1982	2	"Fantastic Day"	Haircut One Hundred	9	1 May 1982	1
8 May 1982	5	"I Won't Let You Down"	Ph.D.	3	8 May 1982	3
8 May 1982	4	"I Love Rock 'n' Roll"	Joan Jett & the Blackhearts	4	8 May 1982	3
8 May 1982	5	"A Little Peace" ^{[D]}	Nicole	1	15 May 1982	2
15 May 1982	2	"We Have a Dream" ^{[E]}	Scotland World Cup Squad 1982	5	15 May 1982	1
15 May 1982	5	"Only You"	Yazoo	2	22 May 1982	1
15 May 1982	2	"Girl Crazy"	Hot Chocolate	7	22 May 1982	1
15 May 1982	1	"Instinction"	Spandau Ballet	10	15 May 1982	1
22 May 1982	7	"Goody Two Shoes"	Adam Ant	1	12 June 1982	2
22 May 1982	5	"House of Fun"	Madness	1	29 May 1982	2
22 May 1982	2	"Forget Me Nots"	Patrice Rushen	8	29 May 1982	1
29 May 1982	4	"Fantasy Island" ^{[F]}	Tight Fit	5	29 May 1982	2
29 May 1982	5	"The Look of Love"	ABC	4	12 June 1982	2
29 May 1982	3	"Mama Used to Say"	Junior	7	5 June 1982	2
5 June 1982	4	"Torch"	Soft Cell	2	19 June 1982	1
5 June 1982	5	"Hungry Like the Wolf"	Duran Duran	5	26 June 1982	1
12 June 1982	5	"I've Never Been to Me"	Charlene	1	26 June 1982	1
12 June 1982	1	"3×3 (EP)"	Genesis	10	12 June 1982	1
19 June 1982	3	"I'm a Wonderful Thing, Baby"	Kid Creole and the Coconuts	4	26 June 1982	1
19 June 1982	1	"We Take Mystery (To Bed)"	Gary Numan	9	19 June 1982	1
19 June 1982	4	"Work That Body"	Diana Ross	7	3 July 1982	1
26 June 1982	5	"Inside Out"	Odyssey	3	3 July 1982	2
26 June 1982	1	"I Want Candy"	Bow Wow Wow	9	26 June 1982	1
26 June 1982	1	"Do I Do"	Stevie Wonder	10	26 June 1982	1
3 July 1982	3	"Happy Talk"	Captain Sensible	1	3 July 1982	2
3 July 1982	5	"Abracadabra"	Steve Miller Band	2	10 July 1982	2
3 July 1982	3	"Music and Lights"	Imagination	5	3 July 1982	2
3 July 1982	1	"The Beatles' Movie Medley"	The Beatles	10	3 July 1982	1
10 July 1982	9	"Fame" (#2)	Irene Cara	1	17 July 1982	3
10 July 1982	4	"A Night to Remember"	Shalamar	5	17 July 1982	1
10 July 1982	1	"Just Who Is the 5 O'Clock Hero?" ^{[G]}	The Jam	8	10 July 1982	1
10 July 1982	1	"No Regrets"	Midge Ure	9	10 July 1982	1
17 July 1982	4	"Da Da Da"	Trio	2	24 July 1982	1
17 July 1982	1	"Now Those Days Are Gone"	Bucks Fizz	8	17 July 1982	1
17 July 1982	5	"Shy Boy"	Bananarama	4	24 July 1982	1
17 July 1982	1	"Iko Iko"	Natasha	10	17 July 1982	1
24 July 1982	6	"Don't Go"	Yazoo	3	31 July 1982	3
24 July 1982	5	"Driving in My Car"	Madness	4	31 July 1982	3
24 July 1982	5	"It Started with a Kiss"	Hot Chocolate	5	7 August 1982	3
24 July 1982	9	"Come On Eileen" (#1)	Dexys Midnight Runners & The Emerald Express	1	7 August 1982	4
31 July 1982	2	"I Second That Emotion"	Japan	9	31 July 1982	2
7 August 1982	3	"Stool Pigeon"	Kid Creole and the Coconuts	7	14 August 1982	1
7 August 1982	1	"The Only Way Out"	Cliff Richard	10	7 August 1982	1
14 August 1982	8	"Eye of the Tiger" (#3)	Survivor	1	4 September 1982	4
14 August 1982	2	"Strange Little Girl"	The Stranglers	7	21 August 1982	1
14 August 1982	2	"My Girl Lollipop (My Boy Lollipop)"	Bad Manners	9	14 August 1982	1
21 August 1982	4	"Can't Take My Eyes Off You"	Boys Town Gang	4	28 August 1982	1
28 August 1982	3	"What"	Soft Cell	3	28 August 1982	1
28 August 1982	5	"Save a Prayer"	Duran Duran	2	11 September 1982	1
28 August 1982	5	"Hi Fidelity"	The Kids from "Fame" featuring Valerie Landsburg	5	4 September 1982	1
28 August 1982	3	"I Eat Cannibals (Part 1)"	Toto Coelo	8	4 September 1982	1
28 August 1982	2	"Nobody's Fool"	Haircut One Hundred	9	4 September 1982	1
4 September 1982	5	"Walking on Sunshine"	Rockers Revenge featuring Donnie Calvin	4	18 September 1982	2
11 September 1982	4	"Private Investigations"	Dire Straits	2	18 September 1982	1
11 September 1982	3	"All of My Heart"	ABC	5	25 September 1982	1
18 September 1982	4	"The Bitterest Pill (I Ever Had to Swallow)"	The Jam	2	25 September 1982	2
18 September 1982	2	"The Message"	Grandmaster Flash and the Furious Five	8	18 September 1982	2
18 September 1982	5	"There It Is"	Shalamar	5	2 October 1982	1
25 September 1982	1	"Saddle Up"	David Christie	9	25 September 1982	1
25 September 1982	3	"Friend or Foe"	Adam Ant	9	2 October 1982	2
2 October 1982	5	"Pass the Dutchie" (#6)	Musical Youth	1	2 October 1982	3
2 October 1982	5	"Zoom"	Fat Larry's Band	2	9 October 1982	1
2 October 1982	3	"Love Come Down"	Evelyn King	7	2 October 1982	3
2 October 1982	1	"Why"	Carly Simon	10	2 October 1982	1
9 October 1982	7	"Do You Really Want to Hurt Me" (#5)	Culture Club	1	23 October 1982	3
9 October 1982	4	"Hard to Say I'm Sorry"	Chicago	4	9 October 1982	1
9 October 1982	3	"Jackie Wilson Said (I'm in Heaven When You Smile)"	Kevin Rowland & Dexys Midnight Runners	5	9 October 1982	1
9 October 1982	2	"Just What I Always Wanted"	Mari Wilson	8	9 October 1982	2
16 October 1982	5	"Starmaker"	The Kids from "Fame"	3	23 October 1982	2
16 October 1982	4	"Lifeline"	Spandau Ballet	7	23 October 1982	2
23 October 1982	3	"Love Me Do" ^{[H]}	The Beatles	4	30 October 1982	1
23 October 1982	1	"Danger Games"	Pinkees	8	23 October 1982	1
23 October 1982	3	"Annie, I'm Not Your Daddy"	Kid Creole and the Coconuts	2	30 October 1982	1
30 October 1982	5	"Mad World"	Tears for Fears	3	6 November 1982	3
30 October 1982	3	"I Wanna Do It With You"	Barry Manilow	8	6 November 1982	2
6 November 1982	6	"I Don't Wanna Dance" (#7)	Eddy Grant	1	13 November 1982	3
6 November 1982	5	"Heartbreaker"	Dionne Warwick	2	13 November 1982	2
6 November 1982	1	"I'll Be Satisfied"	Shakin' Stevens	10	6 November 1982	1
13 November 1982	3	"Sexual Healing"	Marvin Gaye	4	20 November 1982	1
13 November 1982	1	"Let's Go Dancin' (Ooh La La La)"	Kool & the Gang	6	13 November 1982	1
13 November 1982	2	"The Girl Is Mine"	Michael Jackson & Paul McCartney	8	20 November 1982	1
13 November 1982	3	"Maneater"	Hall & Oates	6	20 November 1982	1
20 November 1982	2	"Theme from Harry's Game" ^{[I]}	Clannad	5	20 November 1982	1
20 November 1982	5	"Mirror Man"	The Human League	2	27 November 1982	3
20 November 1982	5	"Young Guns (Go for It)"	Wham!	3	4 December 1982	1
27 November 1982	3	"Living on the Ceiling"	Blancmange	7	27 November 1982	3
27 November 1982	8	"Save Your Love"	Renée and Renato	1	18 December 1982	4
4 December 1982	5	"Beat Surrender"	The Jam	1	4 December 1982	2
4 December 1982	5	"Truly"	Lionel Richie	6	4 December 1982	3
4 December 1982	7	"Time (Clock of the Heart)"	Culture Club	3	18 December 1982	1
4 December 1982	2	"Rio"	Duran Duran	9	11 December 1982	1
11 December 1982	1	"Wishing (If I Had a Photograph of You)"	A Flock of Seagulls	10	11 December 1982	1
18 December 1982	4	"The Shakin' Stevens EP"	Shakin' Stevens	2	25 December 1982	2
18 December 1982	5	"Our House" ^{[J]}	Madness	5	18 December 1982	4
18 December 1982	5	"Best Years of Our Lives" ♦	Modern Romance	4	8 January 1983	1
18 December 1982	4	"Peace on Earth/Little Drummer Boy"	David Bowie & Bing Crosby	3	25 December 1982	2
25 December 1982	8	"You Can't Hurry Love" ♦	Phil Collins	1	15 January 1983	2
25 December 1982	5	"A Winter's Tale" ♦	David Essex	2	15 January 1983	1

== Entries by artist ==
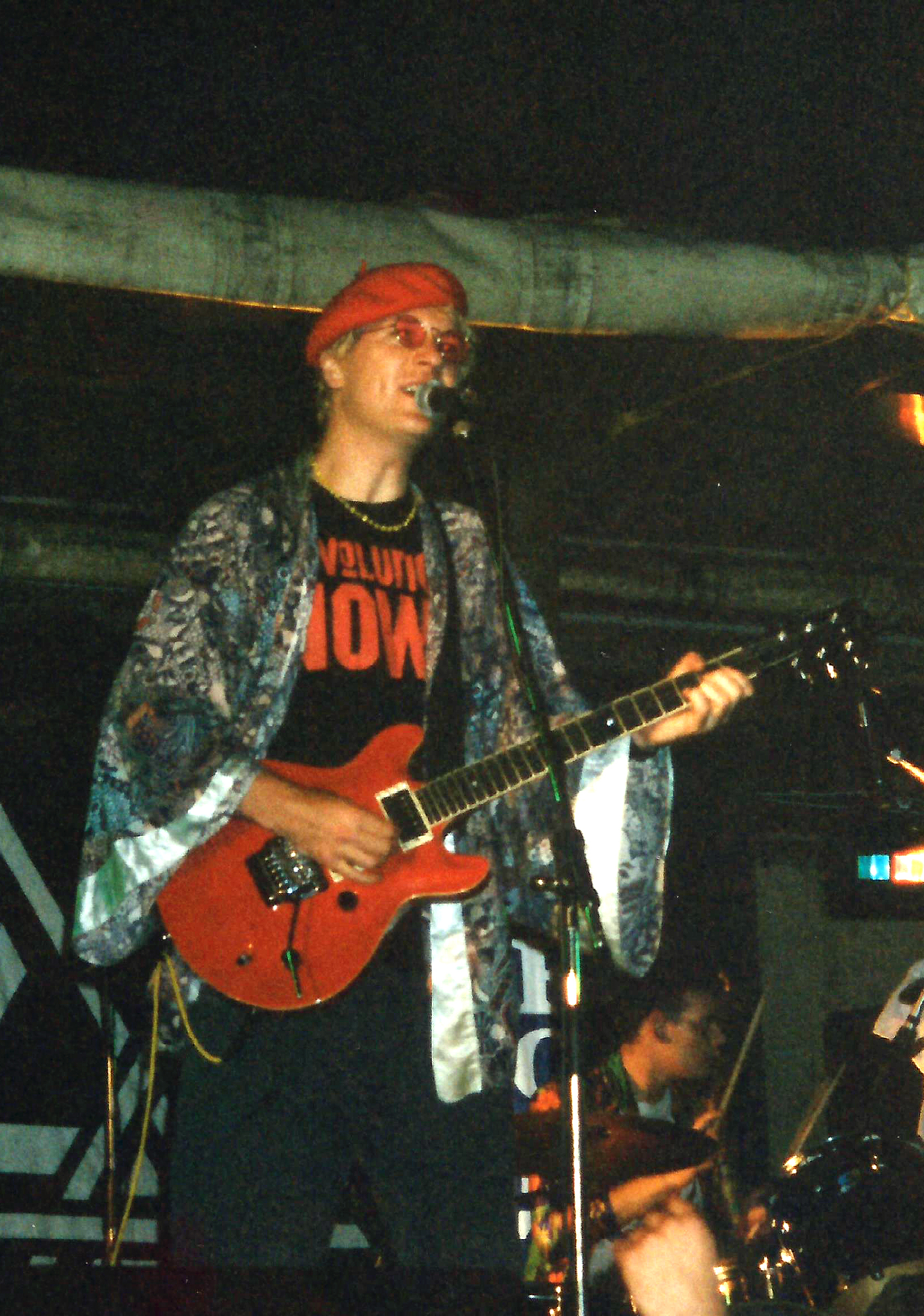
Captain Sensible, the guitarist for punk rock pioneers The Damned, scored a UK number-one hit in 1982 with his cover of the South Pacific song "Happy Talk".

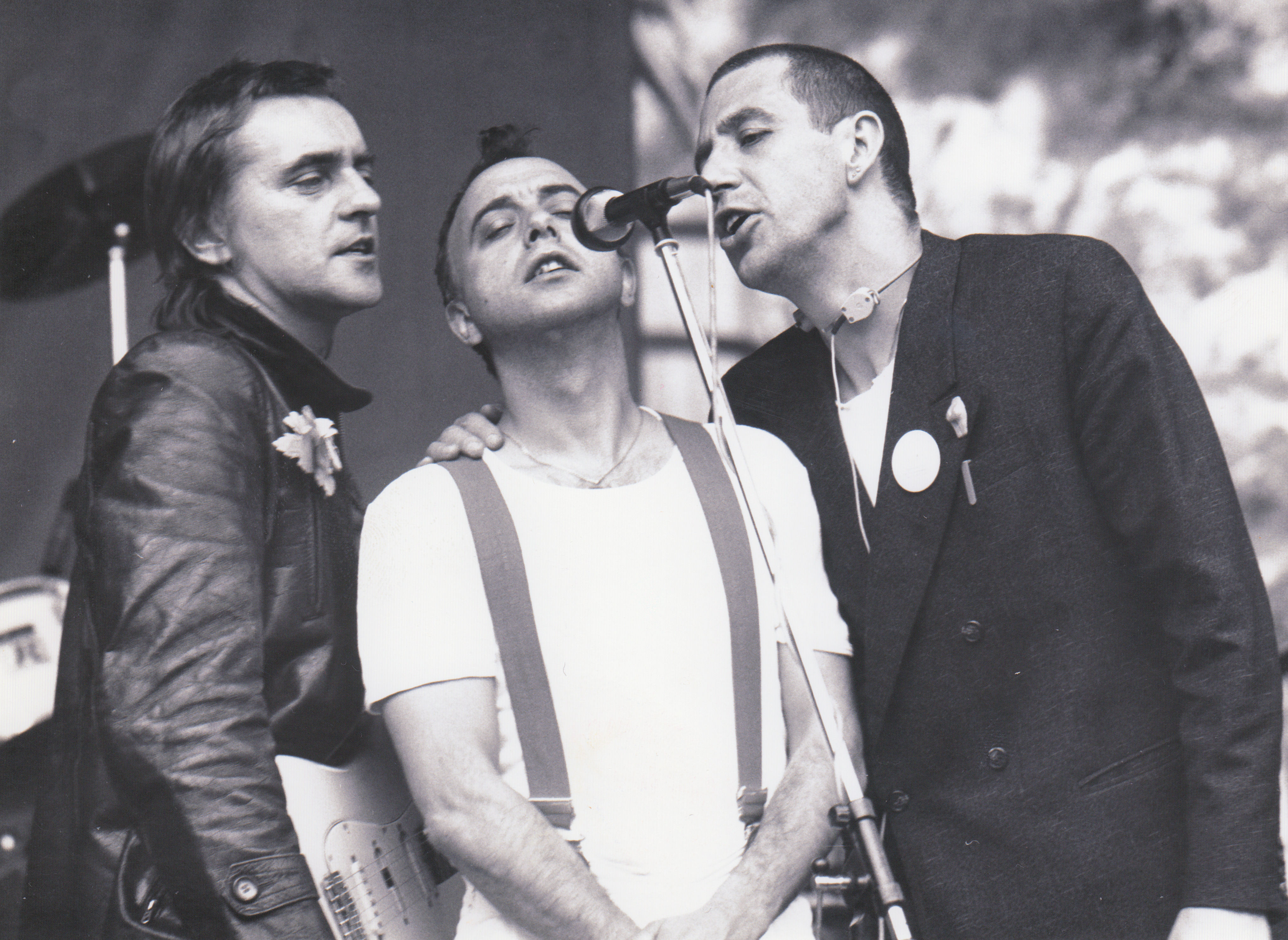
German group Trio became one-hit wonders in the UK this year with their single "Da Da Da", which reached number two in July.

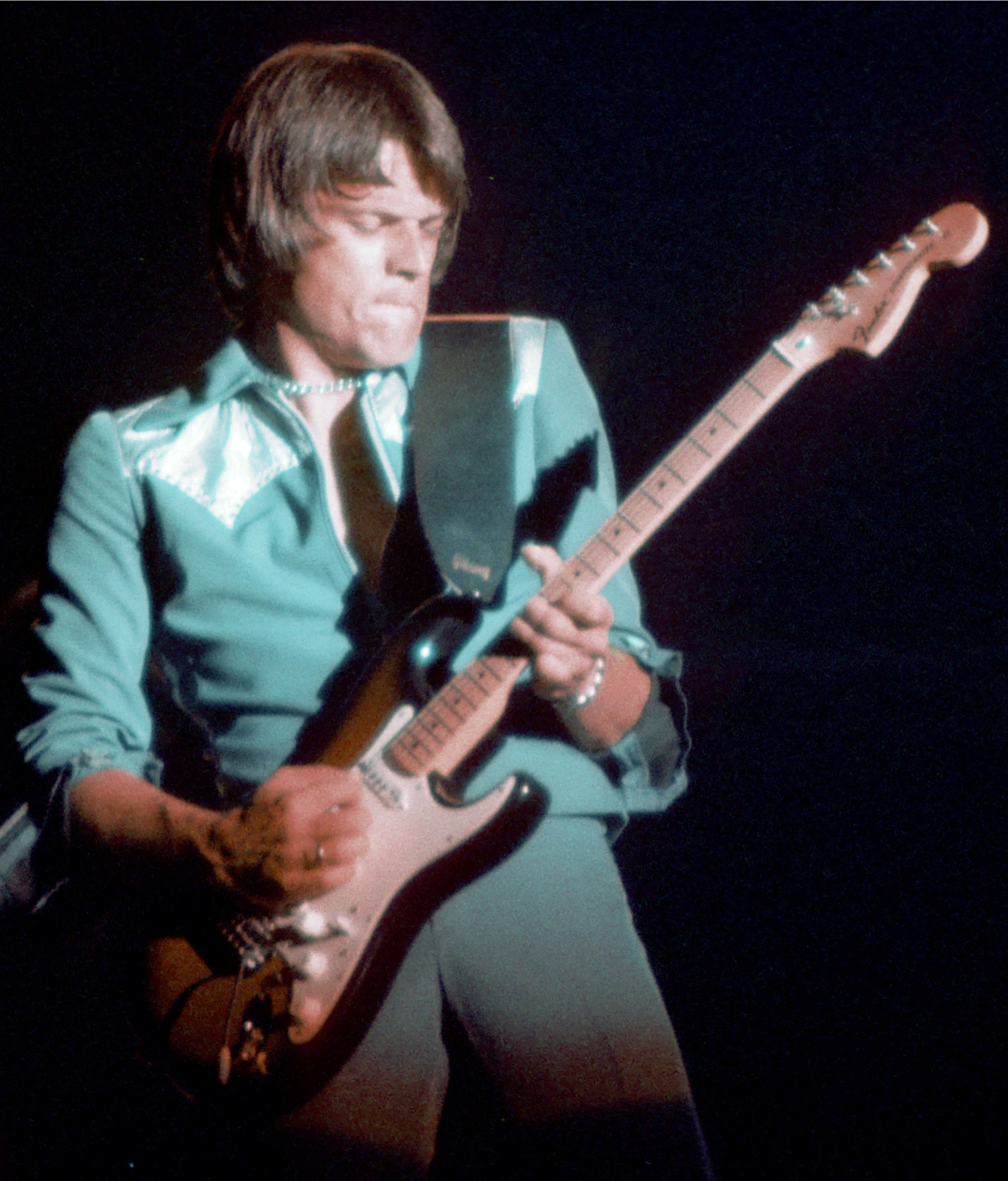
US rock group The J. Geils Band (band member J. Geils pictured) reached the UK top 10 for the only time in their career in 1982 with "Centerfold", which peaked at number three.

The following table shows artists who achieved two or more top 10 entries in 1982, including singles that reached their peak in 1981 or 1983. The figures include both main artists and featured artists, while appearances on ensemble charity records are also counted for each artist. The total number of weeks an artist spent in the top ten in 1982 is also shown.

Entries	Artist	Weeks	Singles
4	The Jam	13	"Beat Surrender", "Just Who Is the 5 O'Clock Hero?", "The Bitterest Pill (I Ever Had to Swallow)", "Town Called Malice"/"Precious"
4	Madness ^{[K]}	15	"Driving in My Car", "House of Fun", "It Must Be Love", "Our House"
4	Paul McCartney	12	"Ebony and Ivory", "Love Me Do", "The Beatles' Movie Medley", "The Girl Is Mine"
4	Shakin' Stevens	9	"I'll Be Satisfied", "Oh Julie", "Shirley", "The Shakin' Stevens EP"
3	ABC	12	"All of My Heart", "Poison Arrow", "The Look of Love"
3	Adam Ant ^{[K]}	13	"Ant Rap", "Friend or Foe", "Goody Two Shoes"
3	Bananarama	8	"It Ain't What You Do (It's the Way That You Do It)", "Really Saying Something", "Shy Boy"
3	Bucks Fizz ^{[K]}	12	"My Camera Never Lies", "Now Those Days Are Gone", "The Land of Make Believe"
3	Duran Duran	12	"Hungry Like the Wolf", "Rio", "Save a Prayer"
3	Haircut One Hundred	11	"Fantastic Day", "Love Plus One", "Nobody's Fool"
3	The Human League ^{[K]}	12	"Being Boiled", "Don't You Want Me", "Mirror Man"
3	Kid Creole and the Coconuts	9	"Annie, I'm Not Your Daddy", "I'm a Wonderful Thing, Baby", "Stool Pigeon"
3	Shalamar	12	"A Night to Remember", "I Can Make You Feel Good", "There It Is"
3	Soft Cell	10	"Say Hello, Wave Goodbye", "Torch", "What"
2	The Beatles	4	"Love Me Do", "The Beatles' Movie Medley"
2	Bow Wow Wow	3	"Go Wild in the Country", "I Want Candy"
2	Cliff Richard ^{[L]}	3	"Daddy's Home", "The Only Way Out"
2	Culture Club	11	"Do You Really Want to Hurt Me", "Time (Clock of the Heart)"
2	Dexys Midnight Runners	12	"Come on Eileen", "Jackie Wilson Said (I'm in Heaven When You Smile)"
2	Dollar ^{[K]}	8	"Give Me Back My Heart", "Mirror Mirror"
2	Fun Boy Three	7	"It Ain't What You Do (It's the Way That You Do It)", "Really Saying Something"
2	Hall & Oates	4	"I Can't Go for That (No Can Do)", "Maneater"
2	Hot Chocolate"	7	"Girl Crazy", "It Started with a Kiss"
2	Imagination	8	"Just an Illusion", "Music and Lights"
2	Japan	5	"Ghosts", "I Second That Emotion"
2	The Kids from "Fame"	10	"Hi Fidelity", "Starmaker"
2	Kool & the Gang	6	"Get Down on It", "Let's Go Dancing (Ooh La La La)"
2	Phil Collins ^{[M]}	2	"3×3 (EP)", "You Can't Hurry Love"
2	Spandau Ballet	5	"Instinction", "Lifeline"
2	Status Quo ^{[L]}	2	"Dear John", "Rock 'n' Roll"
2	Stevie Wonder	8	"Do I Do", "Ebony and Ivory"
2	The Stranglers	8	"Golden Brown", "Strange Little Girl
2	Tight Fit	13	"Fantasy Island", "The Lion Sleeps Tonight"
2	Yazoo	11	"Don't Go", "Only You"

== Notes ==
- ^{a} "Layla" originally peaked at number seven upon its initial release in 1972.
- ^{b} "One Step Further" was the United Kingdom's entry at the Eurovision Song Contest in 1982.
- ^{c} "This Time (We'll Get It Right)"/"England, We'll Fly The Flag" was recorded by the England football team as the official single supporting their 1982 FIFA World Cup campaign.
- ^{d} "A Little Peace" (German: Ein bißchen Frieden) was Germany's winning entry at the Eurovision Song Contest in 1982.
- ^{e} "We Have a Dream" was recorded by the Scotland football team as the official single supporting their 1982 FIFA World Cup campaign.
- ^{f} "Fantasy Island" spent two separate weeks at its peak of number 5, dropping to number 6 on 5 June 1982 before rising a place the following week.
- ^{g} "Just Who is the 5 O'Clock Hero?" was not officially released in the UK (only being officially issues in the Netherlands) but was able to secure its top ten placement on import demand alone - the highest placed import single in UK Singles Chart history.
- ^{h} "Love Me Do" first peaked outside the top ten at number 17 on 2 January 1963. It was reissued in 1982 and reached a new peak of number 4 on 30 October 1982.
- ^{i} "Theme from Harry's Game" was originally composed as the theme song for the Yorkshire Television series Harry's Game before its release as a single.
- ^{j} "Our House" re-entered the top 10 at number 10 on 22 January 1983 (week ending).
- ^{k} Figure includes song that first charted in 1981 but peaked in 1982.
- ^{l} Figure includes song that peaked in 1981.
- ^{m} Figure includes song that peaked in 1983.

== See also ==
- 1982 in British music
- List of number-one singles from the 1980s (UK)
