= Mari Wilson discography =

British singer

- Studio albums: 7
- EPs: 6
- Compilation albums: 5
- Singles: 22

This is the discography of British singer Mari Wilson.

== Albums ==
=== Studio albums ===
Year	Title	Details	Peak chart positions	
Year	Title	Details	UK	SWE
1983	Showpeople	Released: 18 February 1983; Label: The Compact Organisation; Formats: LP, MC; Credited with the Wilsations	24	49
1992	The Rhythm Romance	Released: 30 March 1992; Label: Dino Entertainment; Formats: CD, LP, MC	—	—
2005	Dolled Up	Released: 24 October 2005; Label: Beehive; Formats: CD, digital download	—	—
2006	Girl Talk	Released: June 2006; Label: Linn; Formats: CD, digital download; Collaboration with Barb Jungr and Claire Martin	—	—
2008	Emotional Glamour	Released: 6 October 2008; Label: Beehive; Formats: CD, digital download	—	—
2012	Cover Stories	Released: 1 April 2012; Label: Beehive; Formats: CD, digital download	—	—
2016	Pop Deluxe	Released: 13 May 2016; Label: WG; Formats: CD, LP, digital download	—	—
"—" denotes releases that did not chart or were not released in that territory.

=== Compilation albums ===
Year	Title	Details
1990	Marigold	Released: 1990; Label: Eva; Formats: CD; Japan-only release
1991	Cry Me a River	Released: 1991; Label: Mantra; Formats: CD; France-only release
1992	Beat the Beat	Released: 29 June 1992; Label: Great Expectations; Formats: CD
1992	Just What I Always Wanted	Released: 29 June 1992; Label: Great Expectations; Formats: CD
2007	The Platinum Collection	Released: 8 October 2007; Label: Rhino; Formats: CD

== EPs ==
Year	Title	Details
1983	Mari Wilson	Released: 1983; Label: London; Formats: 12"; Japan-only release
1983	Born Lucky – Live at the Pleasure Dome, 1982	Released: 1983; Label: The Compact Organization; Formats: MC; Free release with the singles "Cry Me a River" and "Wonderful"
1985	The Ready to Hear Collection	Released: 1985; Label: The Compact Organization; Formats: 12"; Limited release
1992	I'm Coming Home	Released: 1992; Label: Dino Entertainment; Formats: 10", CD
1997	Mari Wilson Revival	Released: 31 March 1997; Label: Sony; Formats: CD; Japan-only release
2012	Mari Sings Dusty – The Lost EP	Released: 2012; Label: Beehive; Formats: CD; Limited release

== Singles ==
Year	Title	Peak chart positions				Album
Year	Title	UK	AUS	IRE	NL	Album
1980	"Loveman" (with the Imaginations)	—	—	—	—	Non-album singles
1981	"Dance Card" (with the Imaginations)	—	—	—	—	Non-album singles
1982	"Beat the Beat"	59	—	—	—	Non-album singles
1982	"Baby It's True"	42	—	—	46	Non-album singles
1982	"Just What I Always Wanted"	8	76	11	— (Note: "Just What I Always Wanted" did not enter the Dutch Single Top 100, but did peak at number 4 on the Single Tip chart.)	Showpeople
1982	"(Beware) Boyfriend"	51	—	—	—	Non-album single
1983	"Cry Me a River"	27	—	28	—	Showpeople
1983	"Wonderful" (with the Wilsations)	47	—	—	—	Showpeople
1984	"Ain't That Peculiar"	78	—	—	—	Non-album singles
1984	"Let's Make This Last"	—	—	—	—	Non-album singles
1985	"Would You Dance with a Stranger"	—	—	—	—	Non-album singles
1991	"The Rhythm"	—	—	—	—	The Rhythm Romance
1991	"My Funny Valentine"	112	—	—	—	The Rhythm Romance
1992	"I'm Coming Home"	—	—	—	—	The Rhythm Romance
2005	"Storyline"	—	—	—	—	Dolled Up
2006	"Perhaps, Perhaps, Perhaps"	—	—	—	—	Emotional Glamour
2011	"O.I.C." (with Boisounds)	—	—	—	—	Non-album singles
2011	"The Love Thing"	—	—	—	—	Non-album singles
2013	"First of May"	—	—	—	—	Cover Stories
2016	"White Horses" (promo-only release)	—	—	—	—	Pop Deluxe
2016	"I Couldn't Live Without Your Love" (promo-only release)	—	—	—	—	Pop Deluxe
2017	"Moon and Back"	—	—	—	—	Non-album single
"—" denotes releases that did not chart or were not released in that territory.
