= Cre~Olé: The Best of Kid Creole & the Coconuts =

Compilation album by Kid Creole and the Coconuts
- Released: September 1984; May 1993 (re-release)
- Recorded: 1979–1983, 1993
- Genre: New wave, disco
- Length: 50:11
- Label: Island
- Producer: August Darnell, Andy Hernandez

Kid Creole and the Coconuts chronology
Doppelganger (1983)	Cre~Olé: The Best of Kid Creole & the Coconuts (1984)	In Praise of Older Women... and Other Crimes (1985)

Singles from Cre~Olé: The Best of Kid Creole and the Coconuts
- 1. "Don't Take My Coconuts" b/w "Going Places" Released: July 30, 1984; 2. "I'm a Wonderful Thing, Baby (Brothers in Rhythm Remix)" Released: March 29, 1993

Cre~Olé: The Best of Kid Creole & the Coconuts is the first compilation album released by the American musical group Kid Creole and the Coconuts. It was released on LP and Cassette in 1984 and reached number twenty-one on the UK Albums Chart. A CD edition was released in 1990. The compilation was the group's last record released by Island Records in the UK. The group's following two albums were released by Sire Records in the UK and the US. It includes the single "Don't Take My Coconuts".

In 1993, the compilation was re-released on CD and Cassette with new artwork and the additional track "I'm a Wonderful Thing, Baby (Brothers in Rhythm 7" Remix)". The song was also released as a single to promote the album.

== Track listing ==
All tracks are written by August Darnell; except where indicated.

Side one
No.	Title	Writer(s)	Album	Length
1.	"Lifeboat Party"	Darnell, Ron Rogers	Doppelganger, 1983	2:34
2.	"Stool Pigeon" (Single mix)		Tropical Gangsters/Wise Guy, 1982	3:56
3.	"Gina Gina"	Darnell, Rogers	Fresh Fruit in Foreign Places, 1981	3:46
4.	"Annie, I'm Not Your Daddy" (Single mix)		Tropical Gangsters/Wise Guy, 1982	3:47
5.	"Me No Pop I" (performed by Coati Mundi, 1980 single)	Andy Hernandez		4:21
6.	"Latin Music"		Fresh Fruit in Foreign Places, 1981	2:55
7.	"Off the Coast of Me"		Off the Coast of Me, 1980	3:55

Side two
No.	Title	Writer(s)	Album	Length
8.	"I'm a Wonderful Thing, Baby" (Single mix)	Peter Schott, Darnell	Tropical Gangsters/Wise Guy, 1982	3:51
9.	"Don't Take My Coconuts"		Don't Take My Coconuts, The Coconuts album, 1983	2:08
10.	"Imitation"		From Tropical Gangsters/Wise Guy, 1982	3:55
11.	"Maladie d'amour" (Single mix)	Darnell, Hernandez	Off the Coast Of Me, 1980	4:16
12.	"Dear Addy" (Single remix)		Fresh Fruit in Foreign Places, 1981	3:53
13.	"There's Something Wrong in Paradise"	Darnell, Mark Mazur	Doppelganger, 1983	3:20
14.	"Back in the Field Again"	Darnell, Stony Browder Jr.	Doppelganger, 1983	3:24
15.	"I'm a Wonderful Thing, Baby (Brothers in Rhythm 7" Remix)" (1993 re-release bonus track)	Schott, Darnell		3:47

== Personnel ==
- August Darnell - producer
- Andy Hernandez - co-producer ("Me No Pop I")
- Bruno Tilley - art direction, design
- Peter Ashworth - photography

== Charts ==
Chart (1984)	Peak position
UK Albums (OCC)	21
