= Feel It =

Feel It may refer to:

- Feel It (Fat Larry's Band album), 1976
- Feel It (Some Girls album), 2003
- "Feel It" (D4vd song), 2024
- "Feel It" (DJ Felli Fel song), 2009
- "Feel It" (The Tamperer featuring Maya song), 1998
- "Feel It" (Three 6 Mafia song), 2009
- "Feel It", a 1961 single by Sam Cooke
- "Feel It", a Black Eyed Peas song from the album Monkey Business
- "Feel It", a Kate Bush song from the album The Kick Inside
- "Feel It", a Neneh Cherry song from the album Man
- "Feel It", a song by Killarmy from the album Fear, Love & War
- "Feel It", a TobyMac song from the album This Is Not a Test
- "Feel It" ("Shout It Out Remix"), a theme song from The Wendy Williams Show performed by Fergie
- "I Feel It", a song by Moby from the double A-side "I Feel It/Thousand"
