= Tight Fit (album) =

Studio album by Tight Fit
- Released: August 1982
- Recorded: Battery Studios, London
- Genre: Pop; MOR
- Label: Jive
- Producer: Tim Friese-Greene

Tight Fit chronology
Back to the Sixties (1981)	Tight Fit (1982)	Together (2016)

Professional ratings
Review scores
Source	Rating
Smash Hits	3/10

Tight Fit is the second album by British pop group Tight Fit, released in 1982. The album features the No.1 single "The Lion Sleeps Tonight" as well as the top five hit "Fantasy Island". Tracks "Secret Heart" and "I'm Undecided" were also released as singles but achieved less success.

== Background ==
This was Tight Fit's second album, albeit the first with the line-up consisting of Steve Grant, Denise Gyngell and Julie Harris. They had begun recording the album in early 1982 around the time of the success of the first single. Soon after the album's release, Gyngell and Harris departed the group and were replaced by two other female singers to re-record (and promote) the "I'm Undecided" single. The album was produced by Talk Talk future producer Tim Friese-Greene. Tight Fit was one of the first albums released on the fledgling Jive Records label, which went on to be a major player in the industry for the next 30 years.

In 1986, Samantha Fox recorded the song "Baby I'm Lost for Words" for her debut album (which was released on the same label). The song "Secret Heart" was reworked into "Time Machine", a track on the 1984 Barbra Streisand album Emotion, and was also covered by The Monkees for their 1987 album Pool It!.

Tight Fit was later re-released on the Music for Pleasure label as The Lion Sleeps Tonight, with an added track, "High Wire" (a 1983 B-side).

== Chart performance ==
The album peaked at No.87 in the UK Albums Chart.

== Track listing ==
Side one

1. "The Lion Sleeps Tonight" (Albert Stanton, George David Weiss, Hugo Peretti, Luigi Creatore, Paul Campbell, Solomon Linda) – 3:18
2. "Fantasy Island" (Martin Duiser, Piet Souer) – 3:26
3. "Hearts of Stone Break Hearts of Glass" (Tony Waddington) – 3:58
4. "One Two Three" (Guy Fletcher, Jeremy Bird) – 3:09
5. "Secret Heart" (Brian Fairweather, Martin Page) – 3:44

Side two

1. "I'm Undecided" (Stevie Lange, Tim Friese-Greene) – 3:52
2. "Just a Moment Away" (Simon May) – 4:04
3. "Baby I'm Lost for Words" (Ken Gold, Michael Denne) – 3:46
4. "One Thing Leads to Another" (Edwin Howell) – 3:37
5. "Magic Eyes" (Fairweather, Page) – 3:34
