= Danger Games =

Danger Games may refer to:

- "Danger Games", a song by the English power pop band the Pinkees
- "Danger Games" (Henry Danger episode), an episode of the television series Henry Danger
- The Danger Games, a 2017 Danger Mouse mobile game
