= Shaun the Sheep Movie (soundtrack) =

Shaun the Sheep Movie (Music from the Film)

Soundtrack album by Ilan Eshkeri and various artists
- Released: 1 June 2015 (digital); 29 June 2015 (CD)
- Recorded: 2014–2015
- Venue: London
- Studios: Abbey Road Studios; British Grove Studios
- Genres: Film score; film soundtrack
- Length: 54:45
- Label: Silva Screen Records
- Producer: Steve McLaughlin

Ilan Eshkeri chronology
Black Sea (2015)	Shaun the Sheep Movie (2015)	Survivor (2015)

Shaun the Sheep Movie (Music from the Film) is the soundtrack album composed by Ilan Eshkeri for the film of the same name and released by Silva Screen Records digitally on 1 June 2015 and on CDs on 29 June 2015.

== Development ==
In November 2014, it was announced that Ilan Eshkeri would compose the music for the film. Eshkeri was a "secret grown-up fan of Shaun the Sheep" and considered a dream come true moment on scoring the film. Eshkeri described the music as a tapestry of different styles, where he used banjos, ukuleles and a 65-piece orchestra with more individual scoring sessions, more than what Eshkeri did for his previous projects.

The film first utilizes folky instrumentation as the sheep go about their day on the farm, but after they arrive in the city, it shifts to electric guitar and more aggressive riffs. Since the sheep and other characters, don't talk much Eshkeri had to aid them musically, adding "You have to put so much heart and energy into the characters to bring them to life". Eshkeri considered enjoying the scoring of Trumper, the animal catcher, using electric guitars as the character leans into heavy metal. He considered it nostalgic owing to his childhood when he got his first electric guitar, he often listened to Iron Maiden, Metallica and Megadeth, which led to be a fanatic of heavy metal music.

Besides scoring, Eshkeri also wrote the title song, "Feels Like Summer", a collaboration between Tim Wheeler of rock band Ash and former-Kaiser Chief Nick Hodgson. He considered it quite difficult in order to balance the nostalgia and emotional quotient as the film had no dialogues, and then had to re-record the song using "baas" instead of words. In that process, he did several versions of that spending hours in the studio to get the right version, so that the animators could animate and the mouths of the sheep were right. He worked on the score for over a year.

== Release ==
The soundtrack was released in the United Kingdom digitally on 1 June 2015, and on CD on 29 June 2015.

== Reception ==
Pete Simons of Synchrotones wrote "Ilan Eshkeri's score for Shaun the Sheep Movie is as colourful and eclectic as it is casual. Due to the nature of the film, it is a little too zany and too fragmented to make for a really great stand-alone listening experience [...] but it is a really well written, well-orchestrated and well-produced album. It is really flocking good fun, and houses some catchy melodies."

Guy Lodge of Variety stated "Composer Ilan Eshkeri, taking a breather from scoring the more solemn likes of Still Alice and The Invisible Woman, contributes suitably jangly accompaniment, though assorted pop contributions on the soundtrack don't quite mesh with the wordless story world at hand." Kenneth Turan of Los Angeles Times wrote "the jaunty Ilan Eshkeri score keeps everything sprightly". Kristen Page-Kirby of The Washington Post considered the score to be "incredibly well done by Ilan Eshkeri" aiding the film that did not have dialogues.

== Track listing ==
All music is composed by Ilan Eshkeri, except as noted.

No.	Title	Length
1.	"Feels Like Summer" (composed by Ilan Eshkeri, Nick Hodgson, and Tim Wheeler, and performed by Tim Wheeler)	3:00
2.	"Humdrum Day"	2:30
3.	"Shaun's Plan"	2:00
4.	"You’re Mine" (performed by Chad Hobson and Lucille Findlay)	3:40
5.	"Shaun's Farm House Party"	1:17
6.	"Runaway Caravan"	3:18
7.	"Anarchy on the Farm"	1:17
8.	"Shaun's Mission"	1:22
9.	"Doctor Bitzer"	2:09
10.	"Trumper"	1:32
11.	"Big City" (composed by Ilan Eshkeri and Nick Hodgson and performed by Eliza Doolittle)	1:40
12.	"Le Chou Brulé"	0:53
13.	"Gaol House Blues"	1:12
14.	"Beauty Parade"	1:49
15.	"Gaol Break"	2:53
16.	"Finding the Farmer"	2:40
17.	"Building a Horse"	2:04
18.	"Feels Like Summer" (performed by The Baa Baa Shop Quintet)	1:43
19.	"Trumper on the Scent"	1:00
20.	"Go to Sleep Counting Sheep"	1:43
21.	"Panto Horse Chase"	1:44
22.	"Caravan Ride Home"	1:34
23.	"Showdown at the Quarry"	4:37
24.	"Goodbye Slip"	1:00
25.	"Feels Like Summer (Instrumental)"	1:49
26.	"Life's a Treat (Shaun the Sheep Theme) (Rizzle Kicks Mix)" (composed by Mark Thomas, Jordan Stephens, Harley Alexander-Sule, and Ben Cullum and performed by Mark Thomas, Vic Reeves and Rizzle Kicks)	2:40
Total length:		54:45

== Additional music ==
The following songs that are not featured in the soundtrack, but included in the film are:

- "Rocks" by Primal Scream
- "Search for the Hero" by M People
- "Bad to the Bone" by George Thorogood and the Destroyers
- "I'm a Wonderful Thing, Baby" by Kid Creole and the Coconuts
- "Home" by Foo Fighters
- "House of Fun" by Madness

== Personnel ==
Credits adapted from liner notes:

- Music composer – Ilan Eshkeri
- Music producer, mixing and mastering – Steve McLaughlin
- Programming and arrangements – Paul Saunderson, Steve Wright
- Performers – London Metropolitan Orchestra, Shaun The Sheep Band
- Orchestrators – Jessica Dannheisser, Julian Kershaw
- Conductor – Andy Brown
- Recording – Jason Elliot, Lewis Jones, Matt Jones, Poppy Kavanagh
- Music coordinator – Pete Compton
- Production coordinator – Josine Cohen
- Assistant production coordinator – Lillie Harris, Marli Wren
- Music supervisor – Nick Angel
- Executive producer – David Stoner, Reynold D'Silva

Instruments

- Acoustic Guitar – Stuart Wilkinson
- Alto Saxophone – Jamie Talbot
- Banjo – Sagat Guirey
- Electric guitar – Tim Wheeler
- Fiddle – Jake Walker
- Harmonica, electric piano – Tim Carter
- Melodica – Ilan Eshkeri
- Percussion – Steve McLaughlin
- Trumpet – John Barclay
- Ukulele – Paul Saunderson
- Upright bass – Chris Laurence
- Upright biano – Kenny Dickenson
- Vibraphone, xylophone – Steve Wright
- Whistle – Whistlin' Steve

== Accolades ==
Award	Category	Nominee	Result
Hollywood Music in Media Awards	Original Song – Animated Film	"Feels Like Summer" – (Ilan Eshkeri, Nick Hodgson and Tim Wheeler)	Nominated
St. Louis Gateway Film Critics Association Awards	Best Original Song	"Feels Like Summer" – (Ilan Eshkeri, Nick Hodgson and Tim Wheeler)	Nominated
