= The Millionaires (band) =

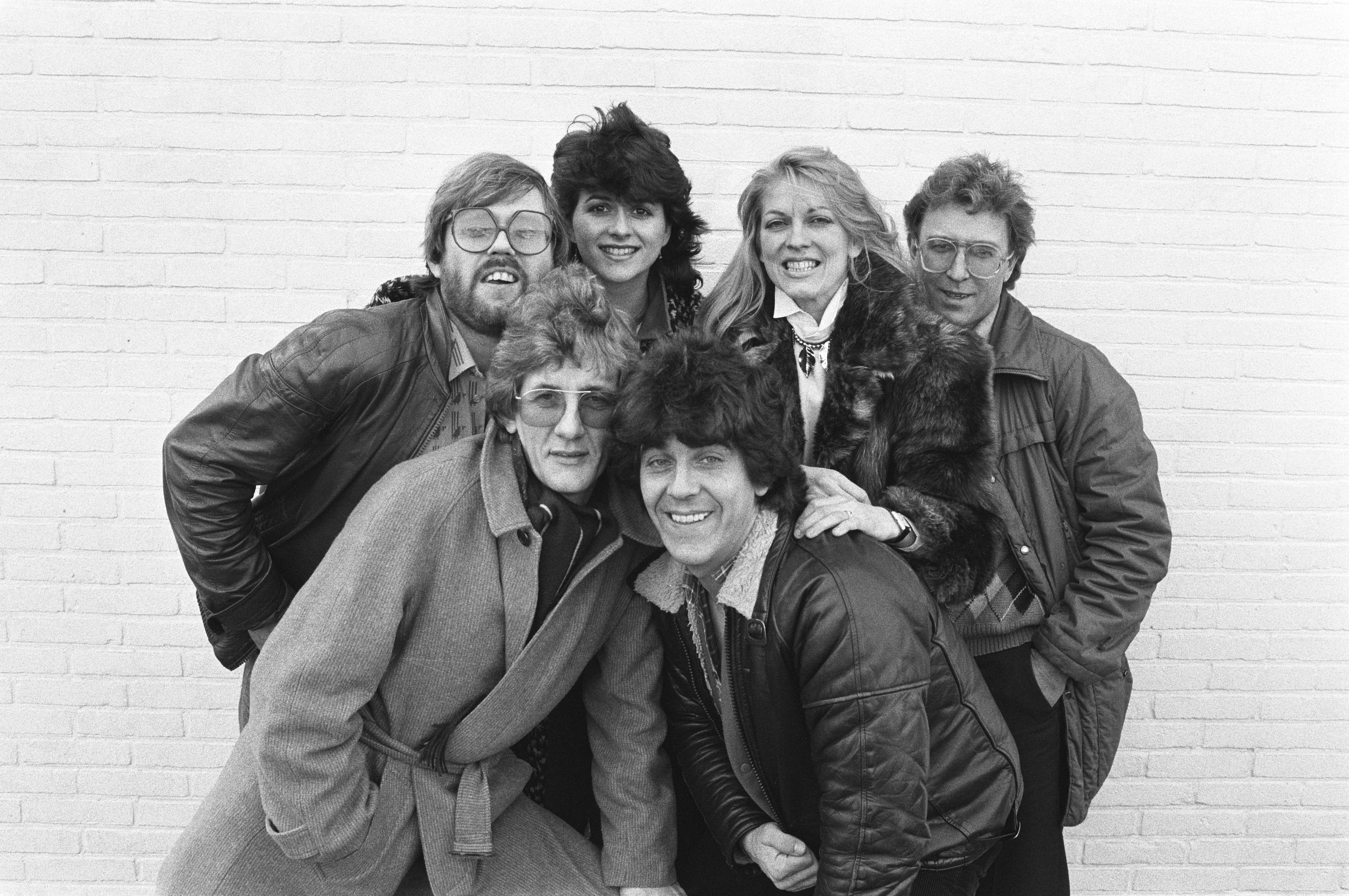
The Millionaires during rehearsals for the Dutch National Song Contest, February 1982

The Millionaires were a Dutch pop group founded 1968 best known for their song at the Nationaal Songfestival of 1982, "Fantasy Island".

Their first major success was the song for the 1980 Summer Olympics "Never Give In", written by the Italian singer Toto Cutugno. The single was released under the name of the band's original singer Jay Delmore (Jaap van der Mooren), who died the same year. After Delmore's death, the band had two female singers, Carmen Montana and Angela Irrgang. The next major success, "Fantasy Island", was written by Martin Duiser and Piet Souer, and released in both Dutch and English versions, but covered again in English by British group Tight Fit.
