= Melinda Marx =

American actress, singer, and musician (born 1946)

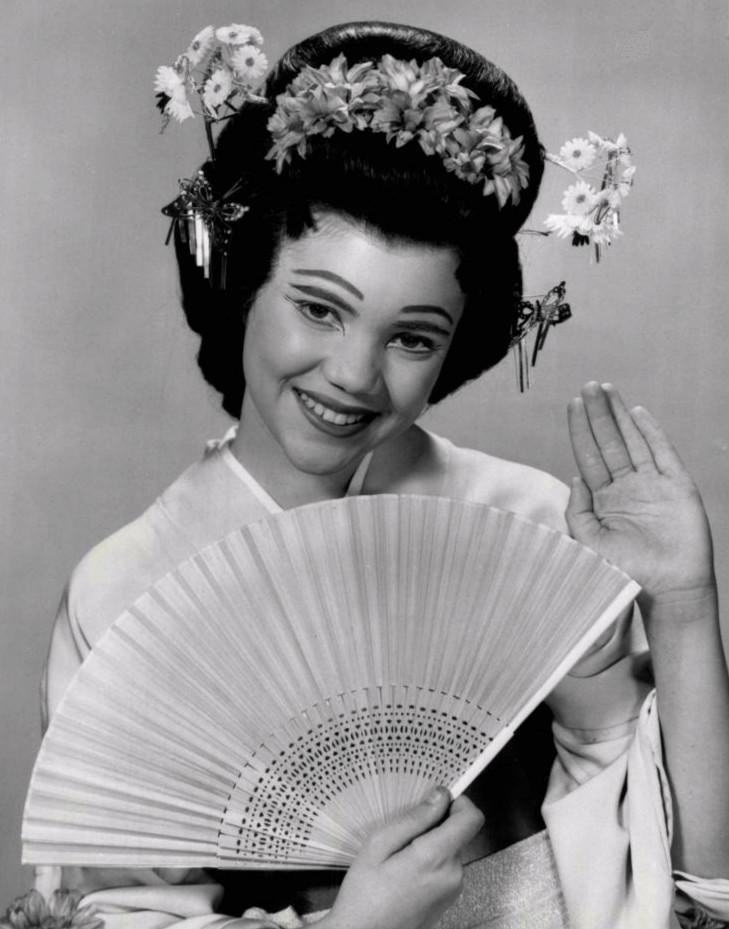
- Marx as Peep-Bo in The Mikado, 1960
- Born: Melinda Marie Marx; August 14, 1946 (age 80); United States
- Other name: Melinda Marx Leung
- Occupations: Actress, singer, musician
- Years active: 1954–1996
- Spouses: Sahn Berti; Jack Leung; Mack J. Gilbert
- Children: 2
- Parent(s): Groucho Marx; Kay Marvis Gorcey
- Relatives: Miriam Marx (half-sister); Arthur Marx (half-brother); Chico Marx (uncle); Harpo Marx (uncle); Gummo Marx (uncle); Zeppo Marx (uncle); Al Shean (great uncle)

Melinda Marie Marx (born August 14, 1946) is an American former actress, singer, and musician who had a brief movie career. She is the daughter and only living child of Groucho Marx and his second wife, Kay Marvis Gorcey.

== Life and work ==
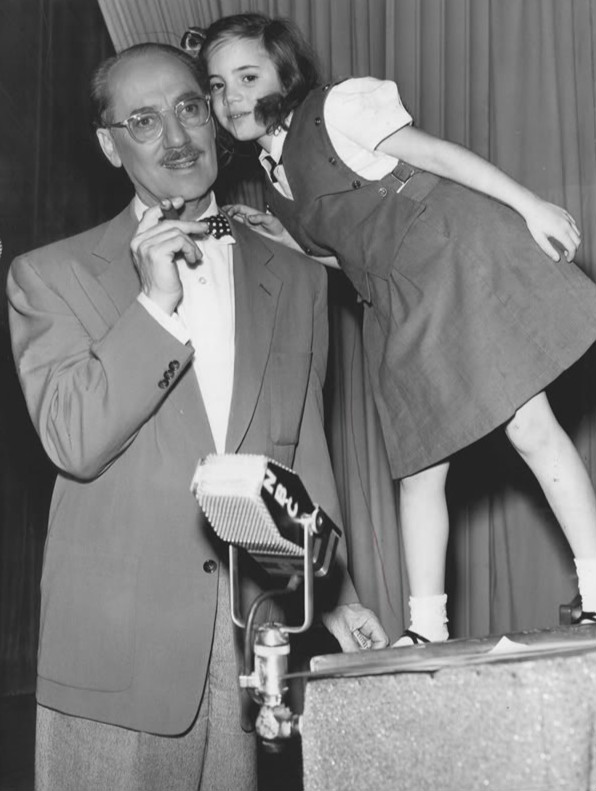
On the set of You Bet Your Life with father Groucho, 1953

Marx appeared frequently on television with her father. She was a contestant/performer on his quiz show You Bet Your Life at least five times: She first appeared at age 8 (a surprise contestant who did not play the game) with boxer Mickey Walker. On this same episode Melinda and Groucho sang "There Is Beauty in the Bellow of the Blast" from The Mikado by Gilbert and Sullivan. On a later episode, she and Groucho teamed up with Edgar Bergen and his then 11-year-old daughter Candice Bergen to win $1,000 for the Girl Scouts of the USA; Melinda and Candice also sang a duet. Melinda appeared on You Bet Your Life again on June 12 – not as a contestant, but as a surprise guest to sing "Witch Doctor".

She appeared a fourth time, on March 17, 1960, solidly acquitting herself in a tap dance routine with hoofer Gene Nelson. She appeared a fifth time in a 1961 episode with singer/actor Bobby Van as a contestant and sang and danced "Put On A Happy Face" from Bye, Bye Birdie with him on stage. They won $2000. Six years later, father and daughter shared a Father's Day installment of The Dating Game.

She acted alongside her father in a television production of The Mikado (1960) on The Bell Telephone Hour and the film The Story of Mankind (1957) in which her father and uncles Chico and Harpo also appeared.

After a few more roles in films, including an uncredited appearance in the movie Bye, Bye Birdie (1963), and The Violent Ones, Melinda retired from acting in 1972. A musician, mostly playing the mandolin, she was in a Gloriana Opera Company (Mendocino County, California) production of Bye, Bye Birdie, in 1996, alternately playing bass and guitar. She is one of their regular ensemble.

In addition to acting, Melinda had a brief career as a recording artist in 1965, appearing on shows such as Shivaree, Shindig! and The Hollywood Palace, to promote her singles "The East Side of Town" and "What".

She is divorced from Sahn Berti, with whom she has two children, including real estate agent Jade Marx-Berti, whose ex-husband Dominic Ruiz is the brother of Dina Eastwood. She married Jack Leung in 1985, and was also briefly married to Mack J. Gilbert, and also used the name Melinda Marx Leung professionally.

With the death of Gummo's son, Robert Stuart in 2023, she is the sole living biological Marx brother child (Zeppo and Harpo's children were adopted).
