= Showpeople =

Studio album by Mari Wilson
- Released: 18 February 1983
- Recorded: 1982–83
- Genre: Pop, new wave
- Label: Compact (UK); London (Europe); Polygram (US)
- Producer: Tony Mansfield; Andrew Powell

Showpeople is the debut album by UK singer Mari Wilson. It was released in 1983 and featured her breakthrough hit "Just What I Always Wanted".

== Background ==
In early 1982, Wilson had achieved minor success with two singles, "Beat the Beat" and "Baby It's True", but it was in September that she broke through to top ten success when "Just What I Always Wanted" became a No.8 hit. The song sparked media interest in Wilson due to her 1960s image (in particular her beehive hairstyle) and retro sound. She was also keen to promote her backing band, The Wilsations, who received joint credit on the album. This was followed up with the more modest hit "(Beware) Boyfriend", but a cover of "Cry Me a River" returned her to the top 30. Alongside this fifth single came the debut album, which also charted well, by reaching No.24 in the UK. One more single was released from the album afterwards, "Wonderful (To Be With)", which proved to be Wilson's final top 75 entry.

The album was released in three different versions: the UK edition, a slightly modified version in Europe and a truncated version in the US. The UK edition featured neither "(Beware) Boyfriend" or "Baby It's True", while none of them included "Beat the Beat". In the US, the album was issued in 1983 on Polygram Records and was released alongside lead single "Just What I Always Wanted", but was unsuccessful. In the UK, Showpeople remains her only hit album.

In 2007, all tracks were featured on Wilson's compilation album, The Platinum Collection. In 2022 it was released on CD with its original running order for the first time as part of Wilson's box set, Mari Wilson: The Neasden Queen of Soul.

== Track listing ==
All tracks composed by Teddy Johns, except where indicated.

=== UK edition ===
Side one

1. "Wonderful (To Be With)" (4.35)
2. "The End of the Affair" (5.16)
3. "One Day Is a Lifetime" (4.28)
4. "Dr Love" (3.30)
5. "Remember Me" (3.46)
6. "Cry Me a River" (Arthur Hamilton) (3.26)

Side two

1. "Just What I Always Wanted" (3.29)
2. "This Time Tomorrow" (Tot Taylor) (3.01)
3. "Are You There (With Another Girl)" (Burt Bacharach, Hal David) (4.40)
4. "I May Be Wrong" (3.21)
5. "Ecstasy" (3.40)
6. "This Is It?" (6.01)

=== European edition ===
Side one

1. "Just What I Always Wanted"
2. "The End of the Affair"
3. "Are You There (With Another Girl)"
4. "Dr Love"
5. "Remember Me"
6. "Cry Me a River"

Side two

1. "Wonderful (To Be With)"
2. "This Time Tomorrow"
3. "One Day Is a Lifetime"
4. "I May Be Wrong"
5. "(Beware) Boyfriend" (4.58)
6. "This Is It?"

=== US edition ===
Side one

1. "Just What I Always Wanted"
2. "The End of the Affair"
3. "One Day Is a Lifetime"
4. "Baby It's True" (4.35)
5. "Ecstacy"

Side two

1. "Wonderful (To Be With)"
2. "Dr Love"
3. "(Beware) Boyfriend"
4. "Are You There (With Another Girl)"
5. "Cry Me a River"

== Personnel ==
- Tony Mansfield - producer
- Andrew Powell - producer and arrangement on "Cry Me a River"
- Teddy Johns - string arrangements
- Tommy Masefield - programmer
- Colin Ryan - guitar, bass
- Mark Cunningham - bass
- Paul Bultitude - drums
- Keith Airey - strums and lead guitar
- Rocky Holman - piano
- Tot Taylor - backing vocals, piano, vibraphone, harp, clavichord, percussion, samples
- Stewart Curtis - saxophone
- Oscar Morse - saxophone
- Lester Moses - saxophone on "Dr. Love"
- Christopher Smith - trumpet, flugelhorn
- Anne Stephenson, Virginia Hewes - violin
- Hank B Hive, Jenny Hallet, John Cogan, Julia Fordham, Mari Wilson, Melvyn J Taub - backing vocals
