= Margaret Vinci Heldt =

American hairstylist (1918-2016)

Margaret Vinci Heldt (February 11, 1918 – June 10, 2016) was an American hairstylist, best known as the creator of the beehive hairstyle.

== Life ==
She was born Margaret Vinci on February 11, 1918 and grew up in Chicago, Illinois. She attended Calhoun Elementary School, Our Lady of Sorrows and Lucy Flowers High Schools and Columbia Beauty School where she became a licensed cosmetologist in 1937. She rose quickly in her profession, winning countless awards and accolades including the National Hairdresser of the Year Competition in 1954. She was an early female entrepreneur, founding and managing a prestigious hair salon, Margaret Vinci Coiffures, on Michigan Avenue for over two decades in the fifties and sixties. Margaret was a highly sought after instructor and mentor to others in her profession, and contributed to the success of entire generations of hairdressers in the Chicago area. She was a member of Hair America, the National Cosmetologists Association, and Cosmetologists Chicago for 78 years. She was inducted into the National Cosmetologists Hall of Renown in 2005, and in 2009 a perpetual scholarship was formed in her name to continue the tradition of helping to educate new young people in her field. When she was training at Columbia College of Hairdressing, she had to make her own practice hair by attaching her mother's hair, after a quick haircut, to a dummy. She married and became Margaret Heldt in the 1940s. "Margaret Vinci Coiffures" opened in 1950 and Heldt won the National Coiffure Championship four years later.

The editor of the magazine Modern Beauty Shop in February 1960 encouraged Heldt, who was already a hairstyling champion and owned an upscale salon, to come up with "something really different" for the new decade, and she devised what became known as the beehive hairstyle based on a small black hat. The first example was on a model who was wearing a small bee decoration in her hair and Heldt says this is how it came to be known as a beehive. The original mannequin used to create the style along with the hat and bee stickpin are on display at the Chicago History Museum. She said that the ideal ratio of hair to face was two to one. She objected to later adaptions of her design by women like Amy Winehouse.
