= England national football team discography =

Various versions of the England national football team have recorded singles over the years, some of which have been hit records.

== Singles ==
Year	Song	Chart positions						Notes
Year	Song	UK	AUS	GER	IRE	NZ	SWI	Notes
1970	"Back Home"	1	-	-	2	-	-	Recorded as by England World Cup Squad '70
1982	"This Time (We'll Get It Right)"	2	-	-	-	-	-	Recorded as by England World Cup Squad
1986	"We've Got the Whole World at Our Feet"	66	-	-	-	-	-	Recorded as by England World Cup Squad
1988	"All the Way"	64	-	-	-	-	-	Recorded as by England Football Team & the Sound of Stock, Aitken & Waterman
1990	"World in Motion"	1	21	21	7	8	27	Collaboration with New Order, recorded as by Englandneworder
2002	"World in Motion"	43	-	-	-	-	-	Re-release of the 1990 single

== See also ==
- List of England national football team songs

== Sources ==
- "England World Cup Squad". Official Charts Company.
