= Denise Gyngell =

Welsh singer, actress and model

- Born: 30 August 1961 (age 65); Porth, Rhondda, South Wales, United Kingdom
- Other name: Denise Waterman
- Occupations: Actress, singer
- Years active: 1972–present
- Spouse: Pete Waterman (m. 1991–1999) (divorced)
- Children: 2

Denise Gyngell, also known professionally as Denise Waterman, (born 30 August 1961) is a Welsh singer and actress. She is best known as a member of the early 80s pop group Tight Fit. She later married record producer Pete Waterman.

== Career ==
As a child actress, Gyngell appeared in "The Darwin Adventure" at the age of eleven with her brothers Paul and Michael, cast as Darwin's children in 1972. The following year, Gyngell appeared in the episode, "Song for Twilight," in "Play For Today" written by Noël Coward, featuring Peter Sallis. She also appeared in "The Zoo Robbery," once again joined by her brother Paul. At twenty-one, Gyngell starred on "The Benny Hill Show" as one of the Hill's Angels. Among her appearances on the show are as one of the "Remote Control Angels" in the Street Dance on the 25 March 1981. Gyngell also appeared in as a non-dancing Angel in the 10 February 1982 episode.

As part of Tight Fit, Gyngell had a No. 1 single with a cover version of "The Lion Sleeps Tonight", and a top 5 hit with "Fantasy Island" in 1982. The band re-formed in 2010 and began doing small gigs around Britain.

In 2024, Gyngell performed at a charity event for Calder Valley Radio. In 2025, Gyngell reunited with her Tight Fit bandmates, releasing a new album. In 2026, Gyngell revealed on Instagram that she was left stranded in Dubai due to the missile strikes across the Middle East.

== Personal life ==
Gyngell married producer Pete Waterman in 1991; the couple divorced in 1999. They have two children.
