= Cry Me a River (Arthur Hamilton song) =

1953 American torch song

Song
- Published: 1953
- Songwriter: Arthur Hamilton

"Cry Me a River" is an American popular song, written by Arthur Hamilton, first published in 1953 and made famous in 1955 with the version by Julie London.

In 2001, the Julie London version of "Cry Me a River" was inducted into the Grammy Hall of Fame.

== Origins and early recordings ==
Arthur Hamilton later said of the song: "I had never heard the phrase. I just liked the combination of words... Instead of 'Eat your heart out' or 'I'll get even with you,' it sounded like a good, smart retort to somebody who had hurt your feelings or broken your heart." He was initially concerned that listeners would hear a reference to the Crimea, rather than "..cry me a...", but said that "..sitting down and playing the melody and coming up with lyrics made it a nonissue."

A bluesy jazz ballad, "Cry Me a River" was originally written for Ella Fitzgerald to sing in the 1920s-set film Pete Kelly's Blues (released 1955). According to Hamilton, he and Julie London had been high school classmates, and she contacted him on behalf of her husband, Jack Webb, who was the film's director and was looking for new songs for its soundtrack. After the song was dropped from the film, Fitzgerald first released her version on Clap Hands, Here Comes Charlie! in 1961. The song was also offered to Peggy King, but Columbia Records A&R chief Mitch Miller objected to the word "plebeian" in the lyric.

The song's first release was by actress and singer Julie London on Liberty Records in 1955, backed by Barney Kessel on guitar and Ray Leatherwood on double bass. London had been urged to record the song by Bobby Troup, whom she would later marry after her divorce from Webb. A performance of the song by London in the 1956 film The Girl Can't Help It, helped to make it a bestseller (reaching no. 9 on US and no. 22 on the UK Singles Chart). It became a gold record, and in 2016, it was inducted by the Library of Congress in the National Recording Registry.

== Joe Cocker version ==
"Cry Me a River"
- US single sleeve

Single by Joe Cocker

from the album Mad Dogs & Englishmen
- B-side: "Give Peace a Chance"
- Released: September 1970
- Recorded: March 27–28, 1970
- Venue: Fillmore East, New York City
- Genre: Rock, soul
- Length: 3:50
- Label: A&M
- Songwriter: Arthur Hamilton
- Producers: Denny Cordell, Leon Russell

Joe Cocker singles chronology
"The Letter" (1970)	"Cry Me a River" (1970)	"High Time We Went" (1971)

British singer Joe Cocker recorded his version as a part of his 1970 live album Mad Dogs & Englishmen. Backed with "Give Peace a Chance," it was released as a single in September 1970, peaking at No. 11 on the Billboard Hot 100. Billboard described it as "powerful updating in the unique Cocker style loaded with sales and chart potency. It's a funky mover from start to finish … a discotheque winner." Cashbox denoted the single as a "Pick of the Week" and wrote "The words are the same as when Julie London hit with 'Cry Me a River,' but there the similarity ends. Sparkling piano, organ and brass work and Joe Cocker's unique rearrangement of the vocal end make the oldie a totally new experience." Record World praised the single as "venerable."

=== Chart performance ===
1970–1971 singles charts
Chart	Peak
Belgium (Ultratop 50 Wallonia)	18
Canada RPM Top Singles	15
Netherlands (Dutch Top 40)	16
Netherlands (Single Top 100)	13
US Billboard Hot 100	11
US Cashbox Top 100	16
US Record World Singles Chart	7

== Notable recordings ==
One site, SecondHandSongs, lists 716 recorded versions of the song (as of October 2024). Versions that charted include:

- Marie Knight (1969) number 35 on Billboard R&B
- Mari Wilson (1983) number 27 on UK Singles Chart from Showpeople
- Denise Welch (1995) number 23 on UK Singles Chart
- Michael Bublé (2009) number 34 on UK Singles Chart

== Use in jazz improvisation ==
The opening phrase, known as the "Cry Me a River Lick", is often used by jazz musicians in improvisations. It was notably explored by saxophonist Dexter Gordon in his composition "Cheese Cake".
