= The Beatles' Movie Medley =

Single by the Beatles
- B-side: "Fab Four On Film" (early copies); "I'm Happy Just to Dance with You"
- Released: 22 March 1982 (US); 24 May 1982 (UK)
- Recorded: 1964–1969 EMI, London
- Genre: Rock
- Length: 4:01
- Label: Capitol (US); Parlophone (UK)
- Songwriter: Lennon-McCartney
- Producers: George Martin, Phil Spector

The Beatles singles chronology
"Sgt. Pepper's Lonely Hearts Club Band / With a Little Help from My Friends" (1978)	"The Beatles' Movie Medley" (1982)	"Baby It's You" (1995)

"The Beatles' Movie Medley" is a compilation of snippets from various Beatles songs. The single peaked at No. 12 on the Billboard Hot 100, and No. 10 on the British charts in 1982. The songs were chosen from the Beatles' films, A Hard Day's Night, Help!, Magical Mystery Tour, Yellow Submarine and Let It Be.

== Songs ==
The songs included in the medley are "Magical Mystery Tour", "All You Need Is Love", "You've Got to Hide Your Love Away", "I Should Have Known Better", "A Hard Day's Night", "Ticket to Ride", and "Get Back". The medley was the first of two singles charting both in the US and the UK in the 1980s credited to the group (the other being a recharting of "Twist and Shout" in 1986). ("Love Me Do" reached no. 4 in the UK in 1982.)

== Issue ==
Capitol Records first issued the single in conjunction with the album Reel Music and was inspired by the success of the "Stars On 45 Medley", a recording which included numerous Beatles songs sung by a John Lennon sound-alike. The song was released in the US as Capitol B-5107 on 22 March 1982.

Parlophone Records initially refused to issue the single in the United Kingdom, regarding the medley as "tacky". But after the import demand for the US release grew, it was finally issued as Parlophone R 6055. The original flip side was an interview with the Beatles about the making of the movie A Hard Day's Night. It was later re-released with "I'm Happy Just to Dance with You" on the flip side.

To this date it remains the only Beatles single to have never been released in any digital format.

== Chart performance ==
=== Weekly charts ===
Chart (1982)	Peak position
Australian Kent Music Report	33
Belgium (Ultratop 50 Flanders)	35
Canada RPM Top Singles	16
Ireland (IRMA)	12
Netherlands (Single Top 100)	24
UK Singles (Official Charts)	10
US Billboard Hot 100	12
US Billboard Adult Contemporary	15
US Cash Box Top 100	14

=== Year-end charts ===
Chart (1982)	Rank
U.S. Cash Box Top 100	86
