= Tight Fit =

English pop group

- Origin: London, England
- Genres: Pop, dance
- Years active: 1981–1983; 2008–present
- Labels: Jive (1981–1983, 2008–2011); Epic (2011–2016); Almighty (2016–present)
- Members: Steve Grant; Denise Gyngell; Julie Harris
- Past members: Richard Scarfe; Martin Page; Brian Fairweather; Vicky Pemberton; Carol Stevens; Silvio Gigante; Alex Naylor

Tight Fit are an English pop group who had several hits in the early 1980s, including a UK No.1 for three weeks with their cover version of "The Lion Sleeps Tonight" in 1982.

== History ==
In 1981, record producer Ken Gold came up with the idea to record a single made up of a medley of 1960s songs. The medley trend was in full swing at this time, following the success of Starsound and their Stars on 45 singles. He put together a group of male and female session singers and released "Back to the 60s" under the group name Tight Fit. The medley included a voice-over by the DJ Emperor Rosko and became a hit in the summer, reaching No.4 in the UK Singles Chart. Instead of the session singers who sang on the record, actor/singers including Lowri-Ann Richards and Robert Pereno were hired to front the group when Tight Fit first appeared on BBC TV's music show Top of the Pops. A follow-up, "Back to the 60s Part 2" was released soon after, reaching No.33 in the UK Singles Chart.

Later in the year, record producer Tim Friese-Greene recorded a version of the song "The Lion Sleeps Tonight" with another group of session singers. The singer was Roy Ward, the former drummer and percussionist from the British 1970s band City Boy. A line-up was put together in late 1981 to front the single consisting of dancer, singer, and model Steve Grant along with female singers Denise Gyngell and Julie Harris. The song was released in early 1982, again under the name Tight Fit. The song gained instant attention, reaching No.1 in the UK for three weeks in March 1982, catapulting Tight Fit into sudden and largely unexpected stardom.

Satisfied this line-up could actually sing in their own right, Friese-Greene began working with them on an album and also produced their next single, "Fantasy Island" – a song by The Millionaires which had been in the Dutch Eurovision Song Contest heats. The song, in a very similar vein to the pop group ABBA, was also a success, reaching No.5 in May 1982.

The group then set about recording an album as well as rehearsing for their first tour. A third single was released in August. "Secret Heart" was not as successful as the previous two, peaking at No.41. The album was released soon after, but coincided with both Harris and Gyngell leaving the group. Both unhappy with their contract, they claimed they were not receiving any royalties from their hits and were being paid a paltry wage for their work. Two new female singers, Vicky Pemberton and Carol Stevens, were promptly employed to take their place, and the group released another single, "I'm Undecided" – a song from the album, with new vocals. The song failed to make the UK Chart, signalling the end of Tight Fit's brief pop stardom. Harris claimed the public did not take to the new line-up, and had she and Gyngell still been with the group, it would probably have been a hit.

The following year, Tight Fit released one more single – a cover of Stephen Stills' "Love the One You're With". Under the name Steve Grant with Tight Fit, the song completely missed the chart and the group duly split up.

== After Tight Fit ==
Grant, Harris and Gyngell all tried to launch music careers outside Tight Fit following their departures. Harris released two singles in 1983: "123" (not the same song as "One Two Three" which she sang on the Tight Fit album), under the name Julie and the Jems, and "Escargot a la Bongo" under the name Chopper Harris. Chopper Harris were contestants on The Freddie Starr Showcase and won their heat with that song. They were second in the final with the song "The Dolphin Dive". Gyngell teamed up with her two brothers under the name He She Him, and released a single, "Try a Little Tenderness". Grant released solo singles "Conviction" (with Earlene Bentley) and "Run for Cover", and in 1986 joined a male three-piece group, Splash!.

Signed for a two-single deal by Elton John's Rocket Records after a chance meeting with Splash!'s manager at PWL Studios, Grant and Splash! released the Stock Aitken Waterman-produced single "Qu'est-ce que c'est". A second single, "European Boy" was recorded with Steve Bronski and Larry Steinbachek from Bronski Beat.

Grant and Harris both appeared on the charity single "Doctor in Distress" by Who Cares in 1985.

Grant's background was in musical theatre, to which he returned afterwards. In the 1980s, he appeared in productions of On the Town and Best Little Whorehouse in Texas, and in the 1990s he appeared in productions of Kiss Me, Kate and Miss Saigon at the Theatre Royal, Drury Lane in London, where he was a part of the cast at various stages between 1992 and 1999, when the production closed. Since 1999, he has lived in London and southern Spain. For a number of years there was a rumour that he had died, but this is untrue. It has been suggested the rumour originated in a mix-up with Jimmy McShane, the front-man of Baltimora who died in 1995, due to the similarity of the image each portrayed in their most well-known hit.

== Reformation ==
In 2008, members Denise Gyngell and Julie Harris reformed Tight Fit as a touring band, playing in nightclubs around Britain. From 2010, they began touring in a show called "Back to the Eighties", performing many well-known songs from the 1980s as well as their own hits. Grant later appeared with them at some gigs until he returned permanently in 2010. Together, they undertook some recording work, with an updated version of "Fantasy Island" being released as a promotional single. They took part in an episode of Pineapple Dance Studios for Sky TV that was shown in 2010. On 2 June 2015, the band announced it had released a new album called Together on Almighty Records, their first together in 34 years. In 2021, the trio signed with Energise Records. In December 2021 the trio released a single called "Fallout", produced by Matt Pop, which is a preview for a new album due to be issued in 2022.

On the band's website it is stated Grant, Gyngell and Harris hold the trademark to the name Tight Fit in relation to all music and publishing.

== Members ==
Current members

- Steve Grant (born 26 February 1960) (1982–1983, 2009–present)
- Denise Gyngell (born 30 August 1961) (1982, 2008–present)
- Julie Harris (born 15 August 1958) (1982, 2008–present)

Former members

- Lowri-Ann Richards (1981)
- Robert Pereno (1981)
- Richard Scarfe (1981)
- Martin Page (1981)
- Brian Fairweather (1981)
- Vicky Pemberton (1982–1983)
- Carol Stevens (1982–1983)
- Alex Naylor (2008–2009)

== Discography ==
=== Albums ===
| Year | Title | Details | Peak chart positions |
| Year | Title | Details | UK |
|---|---|---|---|
| 1981 | Back to the 60's | Released: September 1981; Label: Jive | 38 |
| 1982 | Tight Fit | Released: August 1982; Label: Jive | 87 |
| 1994 | Greatest Hits | Released: 1994; Label: Jive / Tring International PLC; Re-release of the 1982 album Tight Fit | — |
| 1995 | The Best of Tight Fit | Released: 1995; Label: Emporio | — |
| 2016 | Together | Released: 27 May 2016; Label: Almighty | — |
"—" denotes releases that did not chart.

=== Singles ===
| Year | Single | Peak chart positions | | | | | | | | | | | | | Certifications |
| Year | Single | AUS | AUT | CAN | BE (FLA) | GER | IRE | NL | NZ | SUI | SWE | UK | US | US Dance | Certifications |
|---|---|---|---|---|---|---|---|---|---|---|---|---|---|---|---|
| 1981 | "Back to the 60's" | 71 | — | 48 | — | 50 | 6 | — | — | — | — | 4 | 89 | 63 | |
| 1981 | "Back to the 60's Part 2" | — | — | — | — | — | — | — | — | — | — | 33 | — | — | |
| 1982 | "The Lion Sleeps Tonight" | 11 | 8 | — | 1 | 3 | 1 | 1 | 3 | 8 | 17 | 1 | — | — | BPI: Gold |
| 1982 | "Fantasy Island" | 49 | — | — | — | 23 | 3 | — | 33 | — | — | 5 | — | — | BPI: Silver |
| 1982 | "Secret Heart" | — | — | — | — | — | 15 | — | — | — | — | 41 | — | — | |
| 1982 | "I'm Undecided" | — | — | — | — | — | — | — | — | — | — | — | — | — | |
| 1983 | "Love the One You're With" | — | — | — | — | — | — | — | — | — | — | — | — | — | |
| 2010 | "Fantasy Island" (Almighty Remixes) (promo) | — | — | — | — | — | — | — | — | — | — | — | — | — | |
| 2021 | "Fallout" | — | — | — | — | — | — | — | — | — | — | — | — | — | |
"—" denotes releases that did not chart or were not released in that territory.
