= Zoom (Fat Larry's Band song) =

- 1982 single

Single by Fat Larry's Band

from the album Breakin' Out
- Released: 1982
- Genre: Pop; R&B
- Length: 5:26
- Label: Virgin
- Songwriters: Len Barry; Bobby Eli
- Producer: Larry James

Fat Larry's Band singles chronology
"Traffic Stopper" (1982)	"Zoom" (1982)	"Stubborn Kind of Fellow" (1983)

Music video
- "Zoom" on YouTube

"Zoom" is a song by American band Fat Larry's Band released as the fourth single from their fifth studio album, Breakin' Out (1982).

"Zoom" was a commercial hit outside of the group's native United States, peaking within the top ten of the charts in Australia, New Zealand, and the United Kingdom. "Zoom" was especially successful in the latter country, where it peaked at number two on the UK Singles Chart. It was released in Australia on the Virgin label (Virgin VS-546). It remains one of the group's best-known songs, despite charting poorly in their homeland's R&B chart (where it peaked at #89).

== Legacy ==
Filipino singer Regine Velasquez covered the song for her 1996 Asian-released album Retro.

The song was featured in the 1982 Christmas Special episode of the British TV sitcom Only Fools and Horses, "Diamonds Are for Heather".

The song was also covered by the Boo Radleys while recording their 1993 album Giant Steps. It was included on the album's 2020 expanded edition and on the B-side of the 1994 single "Barney (...and Me)".

Scottish singer Scott Bradley covered the song in 1994. Produced by Ian Levine who had previously worked with Take That, it was released as a single and reached number 61 in the UK singles chart.

The song was covered by British pop group Scooch for their 2000 album Four Sure / Welcome to the Planet Pop.

== Charts ==
=== Weekly charts ===
Chart (1982–1983)	Peak position
Australia (Kent Music Chart)	10
New Zealand (RMNZ)	4
UK Singles Chart	2
U.S. Billboard Hot R&B/Hip-Hop Songs	89

=== Year-end charts ===
Chart (1983)	Position
Australia (Kent Music Report)	64
