= Fat Larry's Band =

American R&B and funk band (1976–1987)

- Origin: Philadelphia, Pennsylvania, U.S.
- Genres: Funk, R&B, Disco
- Years active: 1976–1987
- Labels: WMOT, Stax, Fantasy, Omni, Society Hill / EMG
- Past members: "Fat" Larry James; Art Capehart; Doug Jones; Jimmy Lee; Ted Cohen; Tony Middleton; Freddie Campbell; Terry Price; Darryl Grant; Larry La Bes; Erskine Williams; Alfonso Smith; Bryan Hudson

Fat Larry's Band was an American R&B and funk band from Philadelphia, Pennsylvania, which enjoyed some commercial success in the late 1970s and early 1980s, especially in the United Kingdom.

== Career ==
Formed by drummer and vocalist "Fat" Larry James (August 2, 1949 – December 5, 1987) in 1976, the band included trumpeter/flautist Art Capehart, guitarists Ted Cohen and Tony Middleton, vocalists Freddie Campbell (1952 – January 19, 2013) and Darryl Grant, keyboardist Terry Price, vocalist Alfonso Smith, saxophonist Doug Jones, bassist Larry La Bes, trombonist/alto saxophonist Jimmy Lee, and keyboardist Erskine Williams.

The band's biggest hits were "Act Like You Know" (which appears on the Grand Theft Auto: Vice City soundtrack) and "Zoom", which peaked within the top ten of the charts in Australia, New Zealand, and the United Kingdom. In the latter country, "Zoom" peaked at number two on the UK Singles Chart in October 1982. The notable success of "Zoom" in the United Kingdom resulted in the song being featured on the Christmas 1982 episode of the British TV sitcom Only Fools and Horses titled "Diamonds Are for Heather". Fat Larry's Band had three other hits in the UK: "Center City", "Boogie Town", and "Lookin' for Love".

On December 5, 1987, James died from a heart attack at the age of 38. As a result, the band folded.

The opening drum break from "Down on the Avenue", from the band's first album, Feel It (WMOT Records, 1976), has been sampled by many musicians, including N.W.A, Ice-T, Jungle Brothers, Depeche Mode, and Run-D.M.C.

== Discography ==
=== Albums ===
Year	Title	Peak chart positions	
Year	Title	US R&B	UK
1976	Feel It	—	—
1977	Off the Wall	—	—
1978	Spacin' Out	—	—
1979	Lookin' for Love	—	—
1980	Stand Up	72	—
1982	Breakin' Out	—	58
1983	Straight from the Heart	—	—
1986	Nice	—	—
"—" denotes releases that did not chart.

=== Compilation albums ===
- The Best of Fat Larry's Band (1994)
- Greatest Hits (1995)

=== Singles ===
Year	Title	Peak chart positions				Certifications
Year	Title	US Dance	US R&B	AUS	UK	Certifications
1976	"Center City"	—	—	―	31	
1976	"Fascination"	39	—	―	―	
1977	"Peaceful Journey"	—	94	—	—	
1978	"We Just Can't Get It Together"	―	―	―	―	
1979	"Boogie Town"	—	43	―	—	
1979	"Here Comes the Sun"	39	44	―	—	
1979	"Lookin' for Love Tonight"	27	47	—	46	
1980	"Can't Keep My Hands to Myself"	―	—	—	―	
1980	"How Good Is Love"	―	78	―	―	
1982	"Act Like You Know"	24	67	―	—	
1982	"Be My Lady"	―	―	―	—	
1982	"Traffic Stopper"	―	―	―	—	
1982	"Zoom"	―	89	10	2	BPI: Silver
1983	"Stubborn Kind of Fellow"	―	―	―	83	
1983	"Straight from the Heart"	―	―	―	88	
1983	"Don't Let It Go to Your Head"	―	―	―	93	
1986	"Nice"	―	―	―	—	
1986	"Sunrise Sunset"	―	―	―	—	
1986	"Teach Me (There Is Something About Love)"	―	―	―	—	
"—" denotes releases that did not chart or were not released in that territory.

== See also ==
- List of disco artists (F-K)
- Post-disco
- Ultimate Breaks and Beats
