= Fantasy Island (The Millionaires song) =

1982 single by The Millionaires

Single by The Millionaires
- B-side: "Fantasy Island" (English version)
- Released: March 1982
- Studio: Wisseloord Studios, Hilversum, Netherlands
- Genre: Pop; disco
- Length: 2:56
- Label: Utopia Music
- Songwriters: Piet Souer; Martin Duiser; J. van Asperen (Dutch language version only)
- Producer: Piet Souer

The Millionaires singles chronology
"Boys from the Radio" (1981)	"Fantasy Island" (1982)	"Mickey's Monkey" (1983)

Music video
- "Fantasy Island" on YouTube

"Fantasy Island" is a song by Dutch pop group the Millionaires, released as a single in March 1982. It was a top-40 hit in the Netherlands; however, the song is better known for the version released a month later by English group Tight Fit.

== Background ==
The Millionaires participated with "Fantasy Island" (in Dutch "Fantasie eiland") at the 1982 Nationaal Songfestival, which decided who was going to represent the Netherlands at the Eurovision Song Contest. The song came second in the festival, with the winner being "Jij en ik", performed by Bill van Dijk.

== Charts ==
Chart (1982)	Peak position
Netherlands (Dutch Top 40)	31
Netherlands (Single Top 100)	32

== Tight Fit version ==
"Fantasy Island"

Single by Tight Fit

from the album Tight Fit
- B-side: "Saturday Heartbreak"
- Released: April 1982
- Recorded: 1982
- Studio: Battery Studios, London
- Genre: New pop
- Length: 3:23
- Label: Jive
- Songwriters: Piet Souer; Martin Duiser
- Producer: Tim Friese-Greene

Tight Fit singles chronology
"The Lion Sleeps Tonight" (1982)	"Fantasy Island" (1982)	"Secret Heart" (1982)

English pop band Tight Fit released their cover as the second single from their album Tight Fit. It peaked at number 5 on the UK Singles Chart.

=== Reception ===
Reviewing the song in Record Mirror, Sunie Fletcher described the song as an "Abba impersonation that serves only to show 'Wimoweh' in a relatively good light. Reviewing for Smash Hits, Martin Fry of ABC described it as "diluted Abba, but undoubtedly a hit" and that "the song goes around and around and beats you into submission".

=== Track listings ===
7": Jive / JIVE 13 (UK)

1. "Fantasy Island" – 3:23
2. "Saturday Heartbreak" – 3:10

7": Jive / 6.13 463 (Germany)

1. "Fantasy Island" – 3:23
2. "Like Wildlife" – 3:31

12": Jive / JIVE T13 (UK)

1. "Fantasy Island"
2. "Saturday Heartbreak"

12": Jive / 6.20 149 (Germany)

1. "Fantasy Island" – 5:09
2. "Like Wildlife" – 3:31

=== Charts ===
Chart (1982)	Peak position
Australia (Kent Music Report)	49
Germany (GfK)	23
Ireland (IRMA)	3
New Zealand (Recorded Music NZ)	33
UK Singles (OCC)	5
