= List of England national football team songs =

This article details a list of songs released with the approval of the Football Association to coincide with the England national football team's participation in the finals of the FIFA World Cup and/or the UEFA European Championship, with the exception of the tournaments (3 FIFA World Cups and 5 UEFA European Championships) they failed to qualify. (1964, 1972, 1974, 1976, 1978, 1984, 1994 and 2008)

The tradition of World Cup and Euro Cup songs began in 1970 although it had dawned in 1966. Some of the later official songs were eclipsed by unofficial songs released around the same time since 1998; at least 15 World Cup-themed singles were released for the 2002 finals, and 30 for 2006.

The FA announced in January 2010 there would be no official England song for the 2010 World Cup, similar to how there was no official England song for Euro 1968, Euro 1980, Euro 1992 or Euro 2000. Likewise, no official song was commissioned for Euro 2016, the 2018 tournament, the 2022 tournament, or even Euro 2024. The 2026 tournament has marked exactly 20 years since the England national football team last had an official World Cup anthem, with only "Wonderwall" by Oasis having chart success, in being adopted as an anthem by fans.

Tournament	Year	Song	Chart	Writers	Performers	Notes
World Cup	1970	"Back Home"	1	Bill Martin, Phil Coulter	England squad	While not an official song for the England team until becoming a number 1 hit, "World Cup Willie" by Lonnie Donegan was the official song for the 1966 World Cup, and can be seen as the birth of the link between football and pop music in the UK.
Euro	1980	Not applicable				
World Cup	1982	"This Time (We'll Get It Right)" / "England We'll Fly The Flag"	2	Chris Norman, Pete Spencer	England squad	Norman & Spencer, of Smokie, had written "Head Over Heels in Love" for Kevin Keegan in 1979. "England We'll Fly The Flag" was the B-side of the record in the same tournament.
World Cup	1986	"We've Got the Whole World at Our Feet"	66	Tony Hiller, Stan James, Bobby James	England squad	To the tune of "He's Got the Whole World in His Hands"; modified from Nottingham Forest's anthem for the 1980 European Cup Final. The same team co-wrote Scotland's World Cup song, "Big Trip to Mexico". As the official anthem for England at that time, it charted outside the top 40.
Euro	1988	"All The Way"	64	Stock, Aitken and Waterman	England squad	Released as an official football team song for England, before finishing bottom of the Group stage in Euro 1988. Also the first and only official song by the England team within the UEFA European Championships. The official anthem for England at that time charted outside the top 40, similar to how "We've Got the Whole World at Our Feet" did in the 1986 World Cup.
World Cup	1990	"World in Motion..."	1	New Order and Keith Allen	Englandneworder (England squad and New Order)	Featuring a solo rap performed by England winger John Barnes. Commentator Kenneth Wolstenholme re-recorded his famous "They think it's all over" quote from the 1966 FIFA World Cup for the song, which was released to major chart success.
Euro	1992	Not applicable				
Euro	1996	"Three Lions"	1	Ian Broudie, David Baddiel, Frank Skinner	The Lightning Seeds/Baddiel & Skinner	Re-released for the 1998 World Cup, where it topped the No. 1 spot again. Despite this, "We're In This Together" by Simply Red was the official song for the tournament, alongside "Three Lions" as the official FA-sanctioned England anthem, for a tournament which England hosted.
World Cup	1998	"(How Does it Feel to Be) on Top of the World?"	9	Ian McCulloch	England United (Echo and the Bunnymen, Space, Spice Girls, Simon Fowler)	Overshadowed by the unofficial anthems "Three Lions '98" at #1 and "Vindaloo" at #2.
Euro	2000	Not applicable				
World Cup	2002	"We're On The Ball"	3	Ant & Dec, Harold Spiro	Anthony McPartlin, Declan Donnelly	Reached #3 in the UK singles chart, with minimal unofficial competition, aside for a reissue of "World in Motion" at #22.
Euro	2004	"All Together Now 2004"	5	Peter Hooton, Steve Grimes	The Farm featuring the SFX Boys' Choir, Liverpool	Originally released during World Cup 1990, the Euro 2004 version was edited by DJ Spoony. The anthem originally released alongside "World in Motion", and charted at #5 in the UK singles chart.
World Cup	2006	"World at Your Feet"	3	Embrace		Embrace's official song for England reached #3 in the UK singles chart, making it the second England team song to become a No. 3 hit. The first to have done so was "We're On the Ball" in 2002.
World Cup	2010	"Shout (Shout for England song)"	1	Roland Orzabal et al.	Dizzee Rascal (ft. James Corden)	Not an official song alongside "Three Lions 2010", though permission was given for the England football team's logo, and footage of England matches and players was used in the video. Royalties of the single went to Great Ormond Street Hospital. The unofficial anthem was also a No. 1 hit in the charts, making it the first time an unofficial England Football team song went to #1 since "Three Lions '98" did so in the 1998 World Cup.
Euro	2012	"Sing 4 England"	DNC	Paul Baker, B. Routledge	Chris 'Kammy' Kamara (ft. Joe Public Utd)	A charity single not commissioned by the FA but subsequently endorsed by it. The anthem did not even enter the charts either.
World Cup	2014	"Sport Relief's Greatest Day"	7	Take That	Gary Barlow, Eliza Doolittle, Katy B and Spice Girls Melanie C and Emma Bunton with former footballers such as Gary Lineker, Michael Owen, Peter Shilton, Glenn Hoddle and Geoff Hurst	A re-recorded version of the Take That song featuring vocals from Barlow and other pop singers. It was announced as the official song for the England football team at the 2014 World Cup in Brazil, with the video being presented on YouTube, but it was never released as a single. Following his death shortly before the tournament, Rik Mayall's England song "Noble England" reached #7 in the UK charts.
Euro	2016	Not applicable				
World Cup	2018	Not applicable				
Euro	2020	"Olé (We Are England '21)"	51	Krept & Konan feat. S1lva, M1llionz & Morrisson		Released during the tournament, on 26 June 2021. Released in 2021 as Euro 2020 was entirely postponed due to the COVID-19 pandemic.
World Cup	2022	"Three Lions 2022 (It's Coming Home For Christmas)"	47	Ian Broudie, David Baddiel, Frank Skinner	The Lightning Seeds/Baddiel & Skinner	The Christmas version of an England National Football Team song that is not officially endorsed by the FA, but reminiscing on how the Women's Football Team hosted and won the 2022 Women's Euro Cup.
Euro	2024	Not applicable				
World Cup	2026	"Wonderwall '26"	2	Noel Gallagher	Oasis	Reissue of the Oasis chart-topping track "Wonderwall", adopted by the England supporters during their 2026 World Cup run to the semi-finals.

== See also ==
- England national football team discography
- Jerusalem – unofficial national anthem of England
- God Save the King – national anthem of the United Kingdom
