= Beehive (hairstyle) =

Hairstyle

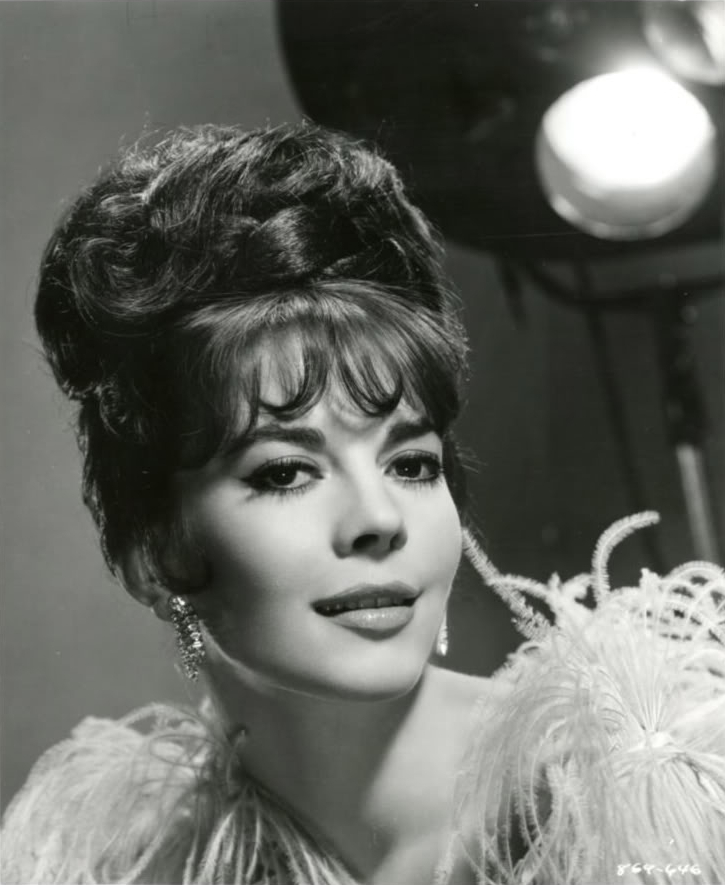
American actress Natalie Wood with a beehive in a 1962 promotional photo for the movie Gypsy

The beehive is a hairstyle in which long hair is piled up in a conical shape on the top of the head and slightly backward pointing, giving some resemblance to the shape of a traditional beehive. It is also known as the B-52 due to a resemblance to the distinctive nose of the Boeing B-52 Strategic Bomber. The 1980s band The B-52's took their name from the hairstyle, which was worn by members Cindy Wilson and Kate Pierson.

== Origin ==
It originated as one of a variety of elaborately teased and lacquered versions of "big hair" that developed from earlier pageboy and bouffant styles. It was developed in 1960 by Margaret Vinci Heldt of Elmhurst, Illinois, owner of the Margaret Vinci Coiffures in downtown Chicago, who won the National Coiffure Championship in 1954, and who had been asked by the editors of Modern Beauty Salon magazine to design a new hairstyle that would reflect the coming decade. She originally modeled it on a fez-like hat that she owned. In recognition of her achievement, Cosmetologists Chicago, a trade association with 60,000 members, created a scholarship in Heldt's name for creativity in hairdressing. The beehive style was popular throughout the 1960s, particularly in the United States and other Western countries, and remains an enduring symbol of 1960s kitsch.

Despite inventing the hairstyle, Heldt did not name it: for the final touch in her original design she added a bee-shaped hat pin and from that a reporter for the magazine Modern Beauty Shop (now Modern Salon) "it looks just like a beehive! Do you mind if we call it the beehive?"

Heldt died on 10 June 2016, at a senior living community near Chicago.

== Technique ==
The beehive is constructed by backcombing or teasing the hair with a comb, creating a tangled pile which is lightly combed over to make a smooth outer surface. The longer the hair, the higher the beehive. Beehive styles of the early 1960s sometimes overlapped with bouffant styles, which also employed teasing to create hair volume; but generally speaking, the beehive effect was a rounded cone piled upwards from the top of the head, while the simple bouffant was a wider, puffier shape covering the ears at the sides. Both of these can be distinguished from the pompadour style, the basic type of which is swept upwards from the forehead.

== Notable examples ==
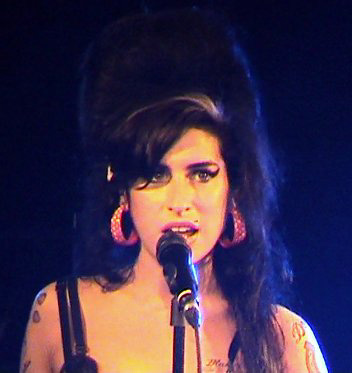
Amy Winehouse revived the beehive hairstyle in the 2000s

- Celebrities such as Audrey Hepburn and Brigitte Bardot, among others, helped popularize the hairstyle. Audrey Hepburn was one of the first to embrace it, famously wearing the style in her role as Holly Golightly in the 1961 film Breakfast at Tiffany’s.
- The popular girl group The Ronettes also helped popularize the hairdo. "We came from Spanish Harlem", recalls the group's veteran lead singer, Veronica "Ronnie" Spector, in a Village Voice interview. "'We had high hair anyway.' So the Ronettes made their hair still higher—'We used a lot of Aqua Net'".
- The B-52's, a new wave rock band took their name from the hairstyle which was worn by members Cindy Wilson and Kate Pierson.
- Coronation Street character Bet Lynch wore a platinum blonde beehive since the 1970s. The Manchester Evening News dubbed this the "worst haircut in soap history" even while acknowledging that it made her one of the series' most memorable characters.
- Marge Simpson from The Simpsons is a well known fictional character with the hairdo.
- The character Flo, a waitress in the 1974 film Alice Doesn't Live Here Anymore, as well as the subsequent TV series wore her hair in a beehive.
- Sheila Broflovski from South Park wears her hair in a beehive.
- Mari Wilson, British singer probably best known for her hit "Just What I Always Wanted" in the 1980s, was well known for her beehive hairstyle throughout that decade.
- Amy Winehouse's beehive was inspired by Ronnie Spector's from the 1960s group the Ronettes. "Ronnie Spector—who, it could be argued, all but invented Winehouse's style in the first place when she took the stage at the Brooklyn Fox Theater with her fellow Ronettes more than 40 years ago—was so taken aback at a picture of Winehouse in the New York Post that she exclaimed, "I don't know her, I never met her, and when I saw that pic, I thought, 'That's me!' But then I found out, no, it's Amy! I didn't have on my glasses."
- Former Arizona governor Rose Mofford was known for her signature beehive hairdo.
- In regard to the beehive of Janice Rand from Star Trek: The Original Series, Tor.com stated, "When you think of the '60s and science fiction hairstyles, the first image is probably Rand’s beehive hair".
- Patsy Stone from Absolutely Fabulous always wore her blonde hair in a beehive with a fringe; a signature trait of the character.
- Lana Del Rey frequently wore beehive hairstyles between 2011 and 2013. Dazed described her updos as tributes to Amy Winehouse and 1960s icons, while Tatler Asia discussed her Priscilla Presley-inspired beehive as part of her vintage Americana aesthetic.

== See also ==
- Bouffant
- List of hairstyles
