= What (song) =

1965 song performed by Melinda Marx

Single by Melinda Marx
- B-side: "It Happens in the Same Old Way"
- Released: June 1965
- Genre: Soul; pop
- Label: Vee-Jay
- Songwriter: H. B. Barnum
- Producer: Norman B. Ratner

Melinda Marx singles chronology
"The East Side of Town" (1965)	"What" (1965)

"What" is a song and single written by H. B. Barnum, performed by Melinda Marx and released in 1965. Marx, daughter of Groucho Marx was a reluctant pop singer and the high notes on "What" found her straining. She recorded only one further single before leaving musical performing which had been foist upon her by her father.

== Judy Street cover ==
In 1968 in Hollywood, California, Judy Street recorded "What", on the Strider label, as a B-side of "You Turn Me On". The record was exported to England and it was picked up by DJs at Wigan Casino, a major nightclub in the northern soul music scene. However, "What" became the track most played, going on to be a hit on the northern soul nightclub circuit and be ranked 23 of 500 northern soul singles. Following a resurgence of popularity for northern soul music in England in 1977, the song was re-released, and again in 1982 with a B-side by Hi-Fly. Street was unaware of the popularity of the song and did not tour the UK and from 1970 until 1990 she toured with her own bands, including The Swinging Society, in the US, singing and drumming. Finally, in 2005 the popularity of "What" was acknowledged when Street did several interviews for radio, magazines and books.

== Soft Cell cover ==
"What"

Single by Soft Cell

from the album Non Stop Ecstatic Dancing
- B-side: "....So"
- Released: 11 August 1982
- Recorded: 1982
- Genre: Synth-pop; new wave
- Length: 2:52 (7" version); 6:11 (12" version); 4:33 (album version)
- Label: Some Bizzare
- Songwriter: H. B. Barnum
- Producer: Mike Thorne

Soft Cell singles chronology
"Torch" (1982)	"What" (1982)	"Where the Heart Is" (1982)

Music video
- "What" on YouTube

English synth-pop duo Soft Cell released a cover of the song in August 1982 as the only single from their remix album Non Stop Ecstatic Dancing. It became their fifth UK top five chart hit, peaking at number 3 on the UK Singles Chart.

=== Track listings ===
7"

1. "What!" – 2:52
2. "....So" – 3:45

7" (US)

1. "What!" – 2:52
2. "Memorabilia" – 5:22

7" (Canada)

1. "What!" – 2:52
2. "A Man Could Get Lost" – 4:05

12"

1. "What!" – 6:15
2. "....So" – 8:45

=== Personnel ===
- Marc Almond – vocals
- Dave Ball – backing vocals, synthesizers, producer ( only "....So")
- Don Wershba – engineering (on "What!")
- Harvey Goldberg – mixing (on "What!")
- Bill Clarke – engineering (on "....So")
- Mike Thorne – producer (only "What!")
- Huw Feather – sleeve design and hand colouring
- Eugene Adebari – cover photography
- "What" recorded at The Camden Cell, London
- "....So" recorded in The Box, West Yorkshire

=== Charts ===
Chart (1982)	Peak position
Belgium (Ultratop 50 Flanders)	32
Germany (GfK)	64
Ireland (IRMA)	6
Israel (IBA)	10
UK Singles (OCC)	3
US Bubbling Under Hot 100 (Billboard)	1
