= Feel It (Fat Larry's Band album) =

Album by Fat Larry's Band

Studio album by Fat Larry's Band
- Released: 1976
- Recorded: 1976
- Studio: Sigma Sound, Philadelphia, Pennsylvania
- Genre: Soul, funk
- Label: WMOT Records
- Producer: Vincent Montana, Jr.

Fat Larry's Band chronology
Feel It (1976)	Off the Wall (1977)

Feel It is the debut album by Philadelphia-based Fat Larry's Band.

Professional ratings
Review scores
Source	Rating
Allmusic	2/5 stars

== Track listing ==
1. "Feel It" - (Larry James, Ronnie Walker, Vincent Montana, Jr.) 5:14
2. "Nighttime Boogie" - (Erskine Williams, Larry James, Larry M. LaBes, Ted Cohen) 5:17
3. "Down on the Avenue" - (Charles Kelly, Larry James, Larry M. LaBes) 5:18
4. "Music Maker" - (Larry James, Larry M. LaBes, Ted Cohen, William Kimes) 3:43
5. "Center City" - (Doris Hall, Larry James, Ronnie Walker, Vincent Montana, Jr.) 3:38
6. "Fascination" - (David Bowie, Luther Vandross) 6:55
7. "Life of an Entertainer" - (Charles Kelly, Erskine Williams, Larry James) 4:41
8. "We Just Want to Play for You" - (C. Gunner, Larry James, Larry M. LaBes) 5:15

== Personnel ==
- Larry James - Drums, Vocals
- Larry LaBes - Bass, Vocals
- Erskine Williams - Keyboards, Vocals
- Ted Cohen - Guitar, Vocals
- Dennis Locantore - Bass
- Ronnie James, Ronnie Walker - Guitar
- Dennis Henderson - Timbales
- James Walker - Congas, Timbales
- Darryl Grant - Percussion, Vocals
- Greg Moore - Congas
- John Bonnie - Alto Saxophone
- Doug Khalif Jones - Alto, Soprano, Tenor Saxophone, Vocals
- Jimmy Lee - Trombone, Alto Saxophone, Vocals
- Art Capehart - Trumpet, Flute, Vocals
- Chestine Murph, Joan Hanson, Mharlyn Merrit - Backing Vocals arranged by Doris Hall
