= The Pinkees =

UK musical group

The Pinkees were an English power pop band from Basildon, Essex, England, active in the early 1980s.

== History ==
The band members were Paul Egholm (vocals, guitar), Andy Price (vocals, guitar), Max Reinsch (guitar, keyboards), Nevil Kiddier (bass) and Paul Reynolds (drums); Price and Kiddier had previously been in Glyder, which had appeared on Top of the Pops in 1976. Piano and additional vocals, when recording, were supplied by their producer Keith Bonsoir.

They released four singles and an album on Creole Records from 1982 to 1983. Their second single, "Danger Games", reached No. 8 on the UK Singles Chart, and gained them appearances on BBC TV programmes such as Top of the Pops and Pebble Mill at One. However, the single's chart run – seemingly stalling at 27, before suddenly leaping into the top ten – led to suspicions of chart-hyping, and the single was formally named as one of two at the time which had been the beneficiary of chart-rigging, which led to the British Market Research Bureau (which compiled the charts) to suspend a member of staff for misconduct; the BMRB lost the chart compilation contract to Gallup soon afterwards.

The eponymously titled album was released on vinyl and cassette but it has never been issued in CD format.

Paul Egholm died in April 2017, after complications following a subarachnoid brain haemorrhage.

== Discography ==
=== Albums ===
- 1982: The Pinkees (Creole)

=== Singles ===
- 1982: "Gonna Be Lonely Again" / "I'm Feeling Lonely" (Creole)
- 1982: "Danger Games" / "Keep on Loving You" (Creole) – UK No. 8
- 1982: "Holding Me Tight" / "Girl in a Million" (Creole)
- 1983: "I'll Be There" / "Rocking with the Band" (Creole) – UK No. 87
