= Stool Pigeon (song) =

Single by Kid Creole & The Coconuts

from the album Tropical Gangsters
- B-side: "In the Jungle (Remixed Version)"
- Released: July 9, 1982
- Recorded: 1981–1982
- Studio: Blank Tapes and Electric Lady Studios, New York City
- Genre: Pop, Latin pop
- Length: 5:00 (album version), 3:25 (7"), 6:20 (12")
- Label: ZE Records, Island Records, Sire Records
- Songwriter: August Darnell
- Producer: August Darnell

Kid Creole & The Coconuts singles chronology
"I'm a Wonderful Thing, Baby" (1982)	"Stool Pigeon" (1982)	"Annie, I'm Not Your Daddy" (1982)

"Stool Pigeon" is a 1982 song by Kid Creole & The Coconuts. It was the second single to be released from the group's third studio album Tropical Gangsters. It reached a peak of #7 on the UK Singles Chart and #25 on the US US Club Play Chart. August Darnell, the lead singer of Kid Creole & The Coconuts, was a great fan of the 1940s' dress style, which for gangsters was double-breasted pinstriped suits and hats. "Stool Pigeon", which Darnell wrote, was a tribute to this whole genre.

The 12" remix of "Stool Pigeon" features a guitar solo by Chic guitarist Nile Rodgers.

== Track listing ==
UK 7" single
No.	Title	Writer(s)	Length
1.	"Stool Pigeon (Remixed Version)"	August Darnell	3:25
2.	"In The Jungle (Remixed Version)"	August Darnell	4:27

US 7" single
No.	Title	Writer(s)	Length
1.	"Stool Pigeon (Remixed Version)" (remixed by August Darnell, Julian McBrowne, Michael Frondelli)	August Darnell	3:45
2.	"The Love We Have"	August Darnell	5:12

UK 2x7" limited edition single
No.	Title	Writer(s)	Length
1.	"Stool Pigeon (Remixed Version)"	August Darnell	3:25
2.	"In The Jungle (Remixed Version)"	August Darnell	4:27
3.	"There But For The Grace Of God Go I (Live Version)"	August Darnell, Kevin Nance	4:49
4.	"He's Not Such A Bad Guy (After All) (Live Version)"	August Darnell	6:10

UK 12" single
No.	Title	Writer(s)	Length
1.	"Stool Pigeon (Remix)" (remixed by August Darnell, Julian McBrowne, Michael Frondelli)	August Darnell	6:20
2.	"Double On Back"	August Darnell	4:28

US 12" single
No.	Title	Writer(s)	Length
1.	"Stool Pigeon (Remix)" (remixed by August Darnell, Julian McBrowne, Michael Frondelli)	August Darnell	6:20
2.	"Annie, I'm Not Your Daddy"	August Darnell	6:27
3.	"I'm Corrupt"	Andy Hernandez	4:11

== Charts ==
Chart (1982)	Peak Position
Ireland (Irish Singles Chart)	15
Netherlands (Dutch Top 40)	19
New Zealand (Official New Zealand Music Chart)	8
UK (UK Singles Chart)	7
US (Billboard Club Play chart)	25
