= Mari Wilson =

British singer (born 1954)

- Also known as: Miss Beehive, Neasden Queen of Soul
- Born: Mari Macmillan Ramsay Wilson; 29 September 1954 (age 72)
- Origin: Neasden, London, England
- Genres: Pop; jazz
- Years active: 1980–present
- Labels: Compact; Beehive
- Website: mariwilson.co.uk

Mari Macmillan Ramsay Wilson (born 29 September 1954, Neasden, London) is a British pop and jazz singer. She is best known for her 1982 UK top-10 hit single "Just What I Always Wanted". She had a further UK top-40 hit in 1983 with a cover of "Cry Me a River".

== Career ==
Recording on Compact Records with her backing band The Wilsations, Wilson scored six UK hit singles between 1982 and 1984. Her biggest hit, "Just What I Always Wanted" peaked at No. 8 in the UK Singles Chart in 1982.

In 1983, she released a cover of "Cry Me a River" (UK No. 27) along with her debut album, Showpeople (UK No. 24). After this, further commercial success eluded her, though in 1985 she recorded the song "Would You Dance with a Stranger" (theme for the film Dance with a Stranger) and turned her career towards live performances. Previously known for her beehive hairstyle, she subsequently distanced herself from her beehive days, but started touring with her old songs again in 2007.

In 1992, her album The Rhythm Romance, which combined jazz standards with 1960s songs and original material, failed to return her to the charts. She continued performing with jazz bands, and she sang the theme song to the sitcom Coupling ("Perhaps, Perhaps, Perhaps").

In 2005, she returned to recording with the album Dolled Up. This was followed by a compilation of her hits, The Platinum Collection, to celebrate her 25th anniversary in the music industry. Apart from pursuing her solo career, she toured with Barb Jungr and Claire Martin as the cabaret act Girl Talk (though Claire Martin has now been replaced by Gwyneth Herbert).

Wilson has also performed in musicals such as Dusty – The Musical, and has been featured on a BBC Television series about celebrities and their health (she has Type 1 Diabetes).

Her band was known as The Imaginations for their first two singles before becoming The Wilsations, and her backing vocalists were called The Marionettes. Occasional featured artists included Michelle Collins and Julia Fordham.

Wilson's fourth studio album, Emotional Glamour, was released on her own Beehive label in October 2008. She has also written and starred in a one-woman musical, The Love Thing.

In 2012, an album of covers called Cover Stories was released, funded by public subscription. She also writes a regular blog about her life and music.

On 30 September 2018, she appeared with Soft Cell, as an unannounced special guest to sing a duet with Marc Almond, as part of their final live concert 'Say Hello and Wave Goodbye, One Last Time' at The O2 Arena in London.

== Personal life ==
Wilson is a longtime resident of Crouch End, north London and is married to TV producer Mal Young. Her parents are from Scotland.

== Discography ==
- Showpeople (1983)
- Rhythm Romance (1991)
- Dolled Up (2005)
- Girl Talk (2006)
- Emotional Glamour (2008)
- Cover Stories (2012)
- Pop Deluxe (2016)
- Girl About Town (2026)
