= Just What I Always Wanted =

Single by Mari Wilson

from the album Showpeople
- Released: 1982
- Genre: Pop; new wave
- Length: 3:22
- Label: The Compact Organization, London Records
- Songwriter: Teddy Johns
- Producer: Tony Mansfield

Mari Wilson singles chronology
"Baby It's True" (1982)	"Just What I Always Wanted" (1982)	"(Beware) Boyfriend" (1982)

"Just What I Always Wanted" is a song by English singer Mari Wilson, released in 1982 as the lead single from her 1983 debut album Showpeople.

As Wilson's fifth single release, "Just What I Always Wanted" was her first UK top 40 hit, reaching No. 8 in October 1982.

Robin Denselow of The Guardian said of the song: "With 'Just What I Always Wanted', Mari Wilson found the perfect song to fit her image – emotional, slightly camp & sounding as if it might have been a pop hit back in the early 60s. It was tongue-in-cheek but performed with deadpan panache, treated the same way Mari treats her stage uniform with her long gloves, jewellery & enormous beehive hairdo."

The song's lyrics mention three people while listing things that the singer wants: artist Pablo Picasso ("not one Picasso, he'll give me a pair"), the song's writer Teddy Johns ("a tune from Teddy"), and the song's artwork photographer Peter Ashworth ("an Ashworth snap").

== Track listing ==
- A. "Just What I Always Wanted" (Teddy Johns)
- B1. "Are You There (With Another Girl)" (Bacharach and David)
- B2. "Woe, Woe, Woe" (Teddy Johns)

== Charts ==
Chart (1982/83)	Peak position
Australia (Kent Music Report)	76
Ireland (Irish Recorded Music Association)	11
United Kingdom (Official Charts Company)	8
