= I'm a Wonderful Thing, Baby =

Single by Kid Creole & The Coconuts

from the album Tropical Gangsters
- B-side: Table Manners" "No Fish Today
- Released: April 30, 1982; April 1993 (re-release)
- Recorded: 1981–1982
- Studio: Blank Tapes and Electric Lady Studios, New York City
- Genre: Pop, Latin pop
- Length: 5:16 (album version); 3:45 (7"); 6:12 (12")
- Label: ZE Records, Sire Records, Island Records
- Songwriter(s): August Darnell, Peter Schott
- Producer(s): August Darnell

Kid Creole & The Coconuts singles chronology
"Don't Take My Coconuts" (1981)	"I'm a Wonderful Thing, Baby" (1982)	"Stool Pigeon" (1982)

"I'm a Wonderful Thing, Baby" is a 1982 song by Kid Creole and the Coconuts from their album Tropical Gangsters. It was the first single released from Tropical Gangsters and their first major hit reaching a peak of no. 4 in the UK Singles Chart. It also reached no. 18 on the US Club Play chart.

In 1993, the single was remixed by Brothers in Rhythm and released as a single to promote the compilation album Cre~Olé: The Best of Kid Creole & the Coconuts.

== Track listing ==
All tracks are written by August Darnell and Peter Schott; except where indicated

7" single (Island/ZE)
No.	Title	Writer(s)	Length
1.	"I'm a Wonderful Thing, Baby"		3:45
2.	"Table Manners"	August Darnell	4:01

US 7" single (Sire/ZE)
No.	Title	Writer(s)	Length
1.	"I'm a Wonderful Thing, Baby"		3:45
2.	"No Fish Today"	August Darnell	4:56

12" single (Island/ZE)
No.	Title	Writer(s)	Length
1.	"I'm a Wonderful Thing, Baby"		6:12
2.	"Table Manners (Remix Version)"	August Darnell	5:02

=== 1993 re-release ===
All tracks are written by August Darnell and Peter Schott

7" single (Island)
No.	Title	Length
1.	"I'm a Wonderful Thing, Baby (Brothers in Rhythm 7" Remix)"	3:48
2.	"I'm a Wonderful Thing, Baby (Brothers in Rhythm 7" Instrumental)"	3:48

12" single (Island)
No.	Title	Length
1.	"I'm a Wonderful Thing, Baby (Brothers in Rhythm 12" Remix)"	7:02
2.	"I'm a Wonderful Thing, Baby (Original 12")"	6:10
3.	"I'm a Wonderful Thing, Baby (Brothers in Rhythm 7" Instrumental)"	3:48

CD single (Island)
No.	Title	Length
1.	"I'm a Wonderful Thing, Baby (Brothers in Rhythm 7" Remix)"	3:48
2.	"I'm a Wonderful Thing, Baby (Brothers in Rhythm 12" Remix)"	7:02
3.	"I'm a Wonderful Thing, Baby (Original 12")"	6:10
4.	"I'm a Wonderful Thing, Baby (Brothers in Rhythm 7" Instrumental)"	3:48

== Charts ==
Chart (1982)	Peak Position
Australia (Kent Music Report)	82
Belgium (Ultratop 50 Flanders)	17
Netherlands (Dutch Top 40)	21
New Zealand (Official New Zealand Music Chart)	49
UK (UK Singles Chart)	4
US (Billboard Club Play chart)	18
US (Billboard Hot Black Singles chart)	44 ^{[A]}

- A "I'm a Wonderful Thing, Baby", "I'm Corrupt" and "Annie, I'm Not Your Daddy" charted together on the Billboard Hot Dance Club Play chart.

Chart (1993)	Peak Position
UK (UK Singles Chart)	60
