= Annie, I'm Not Your Daddy =

Single by Kid Creole & The Coconuts

from the album Tropical Gangsters
- B-side: "You Had No Intention" "Imitation"
- Released: September 24, 1982; February 1983 (US)
- Recorded: 1981–1982
- Studio: Blank Tapes and Electric Lady Studios, New York City
- Genre: Pop, calypso
- Length: 6:16 (album version); 3:52 (7"); 6:26 (12")
- Label: ZE Records, Island Records
- Songwriter: August Darnell
- Producer: August Darnell

Kid Creole & The Coconuts singles chronology
"Stool Pigeon" (1982)	"Annie, I'm Not Your Daddy" (1982)	"Dear Addy" (1982)

"Annie, I'm Not Your Daddy" is a song written by August Darnell and first recorded by his band Kid Creole and the Coconuts. It was released in 1982 as the third and final single from their album Tropical Gangsters. It is Kid Creole and the Coconuts' highest-charting single on the UK Singles Chart, reaching a peak of no. 2. It also reached no. 18 on the U.S. Club Play Chart.

In a 2011 interview, Darnell stated that the royalty income from this song alone would be enough for him to live on.

== Track listing ==
7" single (Island/ZE)
No.	Title	Writer(s)	Length
1.	"Annie, I'm Not Your Daddy"	August Darnell	3:45
2.	"You Had No Intention"	August Darnell	4:50

- Also released as a picture-disc.

US 7" single (Sire/ZE)
No.	Title	Writer(s)	Length
1.	"Annie, I'm Not Your Daddy"	August Darnell	3:45
2.	"Imitation"	August Darnell	4:11

12" single (Island/ZE)
No.	Title	Writer(s)	Length
1.	"Annie, I'm Not Your Daddy (Special Remixed Version)"	August Darnell	6:26
2.	"You Had No Intention"	August Darnell	4:50

- Also released as a picture-disc.

US 12" single
No.	Title	Writer(s)	Length
1.	"Stool Pigeon (Remix)" (remixed by August Darnell, Julian McBrowne, Michael Frondelli)	August Darnell	6:20
2.	"Annie, I'm Not Your Daddy"	August Darnell	6:27
3.	"I'm Corrupt"	Andy Hernandez	4:11

== Charts ==
=== Weekly charts ===
Chart (1982)	Peak position
Australia (Kent Music Report)	89
Belgium (Ultratop 50 Flanders)	4
Ireland (Irish Singles Chart)	4
Netherlands (Dutch Top 40)	3
Netherlands (Single Top 100)	4
New Zealand (Recorded Music NZ)	13
UK Singles (Official Charts)	2
US Dance Club Songs (Billboard)	18
West Germany (GfK)	45

=== Year-end charts ===
Chart (1982)	Position
Belgium (Ultratop Flanders)	55
Netherlands (Dutch Top 40)	37
Netherlands (Single Top 100)	33

- A"I'm a Wonderful Thing, Baby", "I'm Corrupt" and "Annie, I'm Not Your Daddy" charted together on the Billboard Hot Dance Club Play chart.
