= The Voice of Christmas =

The Voice of Christmas: The Complete Decca Christmas Songbook

Compilation album by Bing Crosby
- Released: October 6, 1998
- Recorded: 1935–1956
- Genre: Christmas
- Label: Decca

The Voice of Christmas: The Complete Decca Christmas Songbook is a two-disc collection of Christmas music recorded by Bing Crosby for the Decca label between 1935 and 1956, released by Universal Music Group on October 6, 1998. Crosby was the first popular singer to record Christmas songs, and his 1942 recording of "White Christmas" for the movie Holiday Inn is the best-selling single of all time. The most prolific period for his Christmas recordings was between 1942 and 1955, including his Christmas songs recorded with The Andrews Sisters. Crosby continued to record Christmas titles for other labels later in his career.

== Content ==
Most of the tracks included were originally issued on 78 RPM records. This collection contains all of Crosby's Decca label Christmas recordings, including some duplications of titles recorded at different times. The 1947 recording of "White Christmas" is the most played and considered the "standard" version; this re-recording was made due to the acetate of the 1942 version, and its flip side "Silent Night," becoming too degraded in quality to reproduce further copies.

Tracks are presented in loose chronological order, with collaborations appearing in chronological order on disc two from tracks nine through twenty. Two tracks are previously unreleased songs: an alternate version of his original May 29, 1942, recording of "White Christmas"; and a February 21, 1935, recording of "Silent Night." The 1935 version of "Silent Night" was not released due to Crosby's feelings that a popular entertainer should not profit on such a religion-based song; however, once the proceeds were arranged to be donated to charity, a second recording of the song was released as a single in 1935 and was later packaged as part of a 1940 album.

== Track listing ==
Disc one

No.	Title	Writer(s)	Length
1.	"Happy Holiday" (recorded June 1, 1942)	Irving Berlin	2:27
2.	"Silent Night" (previously unreleased; first version recorded February 21, 1935)	Josef Mohr, Franz Gruber	2:40
3.	"Adeste Fideles" (recorded November 12, 1935)	John Francis Wade, Frederick Oakeley	3:19
4.	"Silent Night" (recorded November 13, 1935)	Josef Mohr, Franz Gruber	3:02
5.	"White Christmas" (recorded May 29, 1942)	Irving Berlin	3:02
6.	"Adeste Fideles" (recorded June 8, 1942)	John Francis Wade, Frederick Oakeley	3:12
7.	"Silent Night" (recorded June 8, 1942)	Josef Mohr, Franz Gruber	2:42
8.	"God Rest Ye Merry Gentlemen" (recorded June 8, 1942)	traditional	2:19
9.	"I'll Be Home for Christmas" (recorded October 1, 1943)	Kim Gannon, Walter Kent	2:56
10.	"Ave Maria" (recorded July 30, 1945)	Franz Schubert	2:59
11.	"White Christmas" (recorded March 19, 1947)	Irving Berlin	3:04
12.	"Silent Night" (recorded March 19, 1947)	Josef Mohr, Franz Gruber	2:37
13.	"The Christmas Song" (recorded March 19, 1947)	Mel Tormé, Robert Wells	2:54
14.	"O Fir Tree Dark" (recorded March 28, 1947)	Ken Darby, N.F.S. Grundtvig, Carl Christian Nicolaj Balle	3:04
15.	"The First Noel" (recorded May 11, 1949)	traditional	2:35
16.	"You're All I Want for Christmas" (recorded May 11, 1949)	Glen Moore, Seger Ellis	3:13
17.	"Deck the Halls"/"Away in a Manger"/"I Saw Three Ships" (recorded May 31, 1949)	traditional	3:27
18.	"Good King Wenceslas"/"We Three Kings of Orient Are"/"Angels We Have Heard on High" (recorded May 31, 1949)	John Mason Neale, Thomas Helmore/John Henry Hopkins Jr./traditional	3:19
19.	"Rudolph the Red-Nosed Reindeer" (recorded June 22, 1950)	Johnny Marks	2:16
20.	"That Christmas Feeling" (recorded September 6, 1950)	Johnny Burke, Jimmy Van Heusen	3:02
21.	"Looks Like a Cold Cold Winter" (recorded September 8, 1950)	Jack Fulton, Al Goering, Caesar Petrillo	3:05
22.	"A Marshmallow World" (recorded September 8, 1950)	Carl Sigman, Peter DeRose	2:40

Disc two

No.	Title	Writer(s)	Length
1.	"Christmas in Killarney" (recorded October 1, 1951)	John Redmond, James Cavanaugh, Frank Weldon	2:44
2.	"It's Beginning to Look a Lot Like Christmas" (recorded October 1, 1951)	Meredith Willson	2:47
3.	"Sleigh Ride" (recorded November 17, 1952)	Mitchell Parish, Leroy Anderson	2:44
4.	"Sleigh Bell Serenade" (recorded November 12, 1952)	Paul Francis Webster, Sonny Burke	2:52
5.	"Christmas Is a-Comin'" (recorded November 22, 1955)	traditional, adapted by Frank Luther	2:41
6.	"The First Snowfall" (recorded November 22, 1955)	Paul Francis Webster, Sonny Burke	3:08
7.	"Is Christmas Only a Tree" (recorded November 23, 1955)	Mark Rebek	2:14
8.	"I Heard the Bells on Christmas Day" (recorded October 3, 1956)	Henry Wadsworth Longfellow, Johnny Marks	2:46
9.	"Jingle Bells" (with The Andrews Sisters; recorded September 27, 1943)	James Pierpont	2:35
10.	"Santa Claus Is Coming to Town" (with The Andrews Sisters; recorded September 27, 1943)	J. Frederick Coots, Haven Gillespie	2:41
11.	"The Twelve Days of Christmas" (with The Andrews Sisters; recorded May 10, 1949)	traditional, arranged by Frederic Austin	3:23
12.	"Here Comes Santa Claus" (with The Andrews Sisters; recorded May 10, 1949)	Gene Autry, Oakley Haldeman	3:03
13.	"That Christmas Feeling"/"I'd Like to Hitch a Ride with Santa Claus" (with Gary, Phillip, Dennis, and Lindsay Crosby; recorded September 5, 1950)	Johnny Burke, Jimmy Van Heusen	2:57
14.	"The Snowman"/"That Christmas Feeling"/"I'd Like to Hitch a Ride with Santa Claus" (with Gary, Phillip, Dennis, and Lindsay Crosby; recorded September 5, 1950)	Johnny Burke, Jimmy Van Heusen	3:23
15.	"Poppa Santa Claus" (with The Andrews Sisters; recorded September 7, 1950)	Johnny Burke, Jimmy Van Heusen	2:15
16.	"Mele Kalikimaka" (with The Andrews Sisters; recorded September 7, 1950)	R. Alex Anderson	2:54
17.	"Silver Bells" (with Carol Richards; recorded September 8, 1950)	Jay Livingston, Ray Evans	3:05
18.	"Little Jack Frost, Get Lost" (with Peggy Lee; recorded November 17, 1952)	Al Stillman, Seger Ellis	1:51
19.	"White Christmas" (with Danny Kaye, Peggy Lee, and Trudy Stevens; recorded April 10, 1954)	Irving Berlin	3:19
20.	"Snow" (with Danny Kaye, Peggy Lee, and Trudy Stevens; recorded April 10, 1954)	Irving Berlin	2:41
21.	"White Christmas" (previously unreleased; alternate take recorded May 29, 1942)	Irving Berlin	3:01
22.	"Let's Start the New Year Right" (recorded May 25, 1942)	Irving Berlin	2:33

== Certifications ==
Region	Certification	Certified units/sales
United Kingdom (BPI)	Silver	60,000^{‡}
^{‡} Sales+streaming figures based on certification alone.

== See also ==
- Holiday Inn (film)
- White Christmas (soundtrack)
- White Christmas (film)
- The Andrews Sisters
