= Frank Sinatra & the Tommy Dorsey Orchestra =

Compilation album by Frank Sinatra
- Released: September 29, 1998
- Recorded: February 26, 1940 – July 2, 1942
- Genre: Jazz; traditional pop
- Length: 190:25
- Label: RCA Victor

Frank Sinatra chronology
The Best of the Columbia Years: 1943–1952 (1998)	Frank Sinatra & the Tommy Dorsey Orchestra (1998)	The Capitol Years (1998)

Professional ratings
Review scores
Source	Rating
Allmusic	3.5/5 stars

Frank Sinatra & the Tommy Dorsey Orchestra is a 1998 compilation album by the American singer Frank Sinatra.

The three-compact disc set contains recordings from Sinatra's performances with Tommy Dorsey and his orchestra at the beginning of his five-decade singing career. Many of the songs had never been available on CD prior to the set, as Sinatra did not record them for his studio albums when he was alive. They had, however, been available as transfers from 78 rpm on vinyl in the six-LP box set The Dorsey/Sinatra Sessions, compiled by Alan Dell for RCA Victor records, set SD 1000, issued in 1982, accompanied by a leaflet including full discography. The track listing of that set differs from below, being in numerical order by original matrix number, and is more extensive, comprising 83 tracks.

== Track listing ==
=== Disc one ===
1. "Polka Dots and Moonbeams" (Johnny Burke, Jimmy Van Heusen) – 3:18
2. "Say It" (Frank Loesser, Jimmy McHugh) – 3:22
3. "Imagination" (Burke, Van Heusen) – 3:13
4. "I'll Never Smile Again" (Ruth Lowe) – 3:09
5. "All This and Heaven Too" (Eddie DeLange, Van Heusen) – 3:36
6. "Fools Rush In" (Rube Bloom, Johnny Mercer) – 3:10
7. "The One I Love (Belongs to Somebody Else)" (Jones, Kahn) – 3:30
8. "The Call of the Canyon" (Billy Hill) – 3:08
9. "Love Lies" (Ralph Freed, Joseph Meyer, Carl Sigman) – 3:20
10. "Trade Winds" (Cliff Friend, Charlie Tobias) – 2:59
11. "I Could Make You Care" (Sammy Cahn, Saul Chaplin) – 3:06
12. "Our Love Affair" (Roger Edens, Arthur Freed) – 2:59
13. "We Three (My Echo, My Shadow and Me)" (Nelson Cogane, Sammy Mysels, Dick Robertson) – 3:01
14. "Stardust" (Hoagy Carmichael, Mitchell Parish) – 3:10
15. "Oh! Look at Me Now" (Joe Bushkin, John DeVries) – 3:13
16. "You Might Have Belonged to Another" (Lucille Harmon, Pat West) – 2:45
17. "Dolores" (Louis Alter, Frank Loesser) – 2:55
18. "I Tried" (Carl Nutter, Paul Hand, Clark Dennis) – 3:15
19. "Do I Worry?" (Stanley Cowan, Bobby Worth) – 3:14
20. "Everything Happens to Me" (Tom Adair, Matt Dennis) – 3:10

=== Disc two ===
1. "This Love of Mine" (Sol Parker, Hank Sanicola, Frank Sinatra) – 3:39
2. "You and I" (Meredith Willson) – 2:44
3. "I Guess I'll Have to Dream the Rest (Martin Block, Bud Green, Mickey Stoner) – 3:30
4. "Two in Love" (Willson) – 2:53
5. "A Sinner Kissed an Angel" (Mack David, Larry Shayne) – 2:52
6. "How About You?" (Ralph Freed, Burton Lane) – 2:52
7. "I Think of You" (Jack Elliott, Don Marcotte) – 2:53
8. "The Last Call for Love" (Marcus Cummings, E.Y. Harburg, Burton Lane) – 2:29
9. "Just as Though You Were Here" (John Benson Brooks, Eddie DeLange) – 3:12
10. "Street of Dreams" (Sam M. Lewis, Victor Young) – 2:39
11. "Take Me" (Rube Bloom, David) – 2:59
12. "Be Careful, It's My Heart" (Irving Berlin) – 2:41
13. "I'll Take Tallulah" (Harburg, Lane) – 3:12
14. "Light a Candle in the Chapel" (Harry Pease, Ed G. Nelson, Duke Leonard) – 3:02
15. "Daybreak" (Harold Adamson, Ferde Grofe) – 3:10
16. "There Are Such Things" (Stanley Adams, George W. Meyer, Abel Baer) – 2:42
17. "It Started All over Again" (Bill Carey, Carl T. Fischer) – 2:25
18. "Let's Get Away from It All" (Adair, Matt Dennis) – 4:57
19. "In the Blue of Evening" (Adair, Alfred D'Artega) – 2:54
20. "It's Always You" (Burke, Van Heusen) – 3:14
21. "I'll Be Seeing You" (Sammy Fain, Irving Kahal) – 3:00

=== Disc three ===
1. "The Sky Fell Down" (Alter, Heyman) – 3:13
2. "Too Romantic" (Burke, James V. Monaco) – 3:09
3. "This Is the Beginning of the End" (Gordon) – 3:12
4. "Devil May Care" (Burke, Warren) – 3:05
5. "April Played the Fiddle" (Burke, Monaco) – 3:05
6. "East of the Sun (And West of the Moon)" (Brooks Bowman) – 3:19
7. "Whispering" (Richard Coburn, Vincent Rose, John Schoenberger) – 2:57
8. "Looking for Yesterday" (DeLange, Van Heusen) – 3:10
9. "Tell Me at Midnight" (Clay A. Boland, Bickley Reichner) – 2:50
10. "Shadows on the Sand" (Adams, Will Grosz) – 2:57
11. "You're Breaking My Heart All Over Again" (James Cavanaugh, John Redmond, Arthur Altman) – 3:03
12. "You Lucky People, You" (Burke, Van Heusen) – 2:37
13. "Without a Song" (Vincent Youmans, Edward Eliscu, Billy Rose) – 4:26
14. "Blue Skies" (Berlin) – 3:17
15. "Violets for Your Furs" (Adair, Dennis) – 3:05
16. "Poor You" (Harburg, Lane) – 2:47
17. "The Night We Called It a Day" (Adair, Dennis) – 3:22
18. "The Lamplighter's Serenade" (Hoagy Carmichael, Paul Francis Webster) – 2:54
19. "The Song Is You" (Oscar Hammerstein II, Jerome Kern) – 3:23
20. "Night and Day" (Cole Porter) – 3:02

== Additional titles in the RCA LP (vinyl) set ==
Most of the above titles are included in the LP set, with the following additions:

1. "Shake Down The Stars" (February 26, 1940)
2. "Moments In The Moonlight" (February 26, 1940)
3. "The Fable Of The Rose" (March 12, 1940)
4. "Hear My Song Violetta" (March 29, 1940) (unpublished take - variant from issued version)
5. "I Haven't Time To Be A Millionaire" (April 10, 1940)
6. "Yours Is My Heart Alone" (April 10, 1940) (remake of title first recorded under same number on March 21, 1940)
7. "You're Lonely And I'm Lonely" (April 23, 1940)
8. "Head On My Pillow" (April 23, 1940)
9. "It's A Lovely Day Tomorrow" (April 23, 1940)
10. "Where Do You Keep Your Heart?" (April 23, 1940)
11. "The World Is In My Arms" (July 17, 1940)
12. "When You Awake" (September 9, 1940)
13. "Anything" (September 9, 1940)
14. "I'd Know You Anywhere" (September 17, 1940)
15. "Do You Know Why?" (October 16, 1940)
16. "Not So Long Ago" (November 11, 1940)
17. "I'll Never Let A Day Pass By" (May 28, 1941)
18. "Love Me As I Am" (May 28, 1941)
19. "Neiani" (June 27, 1941) (unreleased first take)
20. "Free For All" (remake of May 28 version which was not released) (June 27, 1941)
21. "Pale Moon" (August 19, 1941)
22. "How Do You Do Without Me?" (September 18, 1941)
23. "The Sunshine of Your Smile" (Take 3, September 26, 1941)
24. "Snootie Little Cutie" (February 19, 1942)
25. "Somewhere a Voice is Calling" (March 9, 1942)
26. "Dig Down Deep" (June 17, 1942)

== Personnel ==
- Frank Sinatra - Vocals
- Tommy Dorsey and His Orchestra
