= The Song Is You (Frank Sinatra album) =

Box set by Frank Sinatra
- Released: August 30, 1994
- Recorded: February 1, 1940– July 2, 1942
- Genres: Jazz; traditional pop
- Length: 382:55
- Label: RCA

Frank Sinatra chronology
Sinatra & Sextet: Live in Paris (1994)	The Song Is You (1994)	Duets II (1994)

Professional ratings
Review scores
Source	Rating
AllMusic	5/5 stars

The Song Is You is a 1994 box set by American singer Frank Sinatra. A five-disc box set, this release contains every studio recording Frank Sinatra performed with Tommy Dorsey and his orchestra, a few tracks of alternate recording takes, and a full disc of mostly-unreleased radio broadcasts. It is considered a definitive look at the first years of Sinatra's half-a-century long career.

== Track listing ==
=== Disc one ===
1. "The Sky Fell Down" (Edward Heyman, Louis Alter) - 3:14
2. "Too Romantic" (Johnny Burke, James Monaco) - 3:11
  Recorded on February 1, 1940
3. "Shake Down the Stars" (Ed DeLange, Jimmy Van Heusen)
4. "Moments in the Moonlight" (Richard Himber, Irving Gordon, Alvin Kaufman)
5. "I'll Be Seeing You" (Sammy Fain, Irving Kahal)
  Recorded on February 26, 1940
6. "Say It" (Frank Loesser, Jimmy McHugh)
7. "Polka Dots and Moonbeams" (Burke, Van Heusen)
  Recorded on March 4, 1940
8. "The Fable of the Rose" (Bickley Reichner, Josef Myrow)
9. "This Is the Beginning of the End" (Mack Gordon)
  Recorded on March 12, 1940
10. "Hear My Song Violetta" (Buddy Bernier, Robert Emmerich, Othmar Klase, Rudolph Inkesch)
11. "Fools Rush In (Where Angels Fear to Tread)" (Rube Bloom, Johnny Mercer)
12. "Devil May Care" (Burke, Harry Warren)
  Recorded on March 29, 1940
13. "April Played the Fiddle" (Burke, Monaco)
14. "I Haven't the Time to Be a Millionaire" (Burke, Monaco)
15. "Imagination" (Burke, Van Heusen)
  Recorded on April 10, 1940
16. "Yours Is My Heart Alone" (Franz Lehár, Ludwig Herzer, Fritz Löhner-Beda)
  Recorded on March 25, 1940
17. "You're Lonely and I'm Lonely" (Irving Berlin)
18. "East of the Sun (and West of the Moon)" (Brooks Bowman)
19. "Head On My Pillow" (Bissel Palmer, Pierre Connor)
20. "It's a Lovely Day Tomorrow" (Berlin)
  Recorded on April 23, 1940
21. "I'll Never Smile Again" (Ruth Lowe)
22. "All This and Heaven Too" (DeLange, Van Heusen)
23. "Where Do You Keep Your Heart?" (Al Stillman, Fred Ahlert)
  Recorded on May 23, 1940

=== Disc two ===
1. "Whispering" (Vincent Rose, Richard Coburn, John Schonberger)
  Recorded on June 13, 1940
2. "Trade Winds" (Cliff Friend, Charles Tobias)
3. "The One I Love (Belongs to Somebody Else)" (Isham Jones, Gus Kahn)
  Recorded on June 27, 1940
4. "The Call of the Canyon" (Billy Hill)
5. "Love Lies" (Carl Sigman, Ralph Freed, Joseph Meyer)
6. "I Could Make You Care" (Sammy Cahn, Saul Chaplin)
7. "The World Is in My Arms" (Yip Harburg, Burton Lane)
  Recorded on July 17, 1940
8. "Our Love Affair" (Freed, Roger Edens)
9. "Looking for Yesterday" (DeLange, Van Heusen)
10. "Tell Me at Midnight" (Clay A. Boland, Bickley Reichner)
11. "We Three (My Echo, My Shadow and Me)" (Dick Robertson, Nelson Cogane, Sammy Mysels)
  Recorded on August 29, 1940
12. "When You Awake" (Henry Nemo)
13. "Anything" (DeLange, Frank Signorelli, P. Napoleon)
  Recorded on September 9, 1940
14. "Shadows on the Sand" (Stanley Adams, Will Grosz)
15. "You're Breaking My Heart All Over Again" (James Cavanaugh, John Redmond, Arthur Altman)
16. "I'd Know You Anywhere" (Mercer, Jimmy McHugh)
  Recorded on September 17, 1940
17. "Do You Know Why?" (Burke, Van Heusen)
  Recorded on October 16, 1940
18. "Not So Long Ago" (Reichner, Boland)
19. "Stardust" (Hoagy Carmichael, Mitchell Parish)
  Recorded on November 11, 1940
20. "Oh! Look at Me Now" (Joe Bushkin, John DeVries)
21. "You Might Have Belonged to Another" (P. West, L. Harmon)
  Recorded on January 6, 1941
22. "You Lucky People, You" (Burke, Van Heusen)
23. "It's Always You" (Burke, Van Heusen)
  Recorded on January 15, 1941
24. "I Tried" (Carl Nutter, Paul Hand, Clark Dennis)
  Recorded on January 20, 1941

=== Disc three ===
1. "Dolores" (Loesser, Alter)
2. "Without a Song" (Vincent Youmans, Edward Eliscu, Billy Rose)
  Recorded on January 20, 1941
3. "Do I Worry?" (Bobby Worth, Stanley Cowan)
4. "Everything Happens to Me" (Matt Dennis, Tom Adair)
  Recorded on February 7, 1941
5. "Let's Get Away from It All" (Dennis, Adair)
  Recorded on February 17, 1941
6. "I'll Never Let a Day Pass By" (Loesser, Victor Schertzinger)
7. "Love Me As I Am" (Loesser, Alter)
8. "This Love of Mine" (Sol Parker, Hank Sanicola, Frank Sinatra)
  Recorded on May 28, 1941
9. "I Guess I'll Have to Dream the Rest" (Mickey Stoner, Bud Green, Martin Block)
10. "You & I" (Meredith Willson)
11. "Neiani" (Axel Stordahl, Sy Oliver)
12. "Free for All" (Tom Adair, Matt Dennis)
  Recorded on June 27, 1941
13. "Blue Skies" (Berlin)
  Recorded on July 15, 1941
14. "Two In Love" (Meredith Willson)
15. "Pale Moon (An Indian Love Song)" (Jesse Glick, Frederick Logan)
  Recorded on August 19, 1941
16. "I Think of You" (J. Elliot, Don Marcotte)
17. "How Do You Do Without Me?" (Bushkin, DeVries)
18. "A Sinner Kissed An Angel" (Mack David, Larry Shayne)
  Recorded on September 18, 1941
19. "Violets for Your Furs" (Dennis, Adair)
20. "The Sunshine of Your Smile" (Leonard Cooke, Lillian Ray)
  Recorded on September 26, 1941
21. "How About You?" (Lane, Ralph Freed)
  Recorded on December 22, 1941
22. "Snootie Little Cutie" (Bobby Troup)
  Recorded on February 19, 1942

=== Disc four ===
1. "Poor You" (Harburg, Lane)
2. "I'll Take Tallulah" (Harburg, Lane)
3. "The Last Call for Love" (Harburg, Lane, M. Cummings)
  Recorded on February 19, 1942
4. "Somewhere a Voice Is Calling" (Eileen Newton, Arthur Tate)
  Recorded on March 9, 1942
5. "Just As Though You Were Here" (DeLange, John Benson Brooks)
6. "Street of Dreams" (Victor Young, Sam M. Lewis)
  Recorded on May 18, 1942
7. "Take Me" (Bloom, David)
8. "Be Careful, It's My Heart" (Berlin)
  Recorded on June 9, 1942
9. "In the Blue of Evening" (Adair, Alfred D'Artega)
10. "Dig Down Deep" (Walter Hirsch, Gerald Marks, S. Marco)
  Recorded on June 17, 1942
11. "There Are Such Things" (Stanley Adams, George W. Meyer, Abel Baer)
12. "Daybreak" (Harold Adamson, Ferde Grofe)
13. "It Started All Over Again" (Bill Carey, Carl T. Fischer)
  Recorded on July 1, 1942
14. "Light a Candle In the Chapel" (Harry Pease, Ed G. Nelson, Duke Leonard)
  Recorded on July 2, 1942
15. "Too Romantic" [Take 2]
  Recorded on February 1, 1940
16. "Shake Down the Stars" [Take 2]
  Recorded on February 26, 1940
17. "Hear My Song Violetta" (Take 2)
  Recorded on March 29, 1940
18. "You're Lonely and I'm Lonely" [Take 3]
  Recorded on April 23, 1940
19. "Our Love Affair" [Take 2]
  Recorded on August 29, 1940
20. "Violets for Your Furs" [Take 2]
  Recorded on August 19, 1941
21. "The Night We Called It a Day" (Dennis, Adair)
22. "The Lamplighter's Serenade" (Carmichael, Paul Francis Webster)
23. "The Song Is You" (Jerome Kern, Oscar Hammerstein II)
24. "Night and Day" (Cole Porter)
  Recorded on January 19, 1942

=== Disc Five (Radio Broadcasts) ===
1. Theme: "I'm Getting Sentimental Over You" (George Bassman, Ned Washington)
2. "Who?" (Kern, Otto Harbach, Hammerstein II)
3. "I Hear a Rhapsody" (George Fragos, Jack Baker, Dick Gasparre)
4. "I'll Never Smile Again"
5. "Half-Way Down the Street" (Fred Waring)
6. "Some of Your Sweetness (Got Into My Heart)" (J. Clayborn, G. Clayborn)
7. "Once in a While"
8. "A Little In Love"
9. "It Came to Me"
10. "Only Forever"
11. "Marie"
12. "Yearning"
13. "How Am I to Know"
14. "You're Part of My Heart"
15. Announcements
16. "You're Stepping On My Toes"
17. "You Got the Best of Me"
18. "That's How It Goes"
19. "When Daylight Dawns"
20. "When Sleepy Stars Begin to Fall"
21. "Goodbye Lover, Goodbye"
22. "One Red Rose"
23. "The Things I Love"
24. "In the Blue of Evening"
25. "Just As Though You Were Here"
26. Frank Sinatra's Farewell to the Tommy Dorsey Orchestra
27. "The Song Is You"

== Personnel ==
- Frank Sinatra – vocals
- Tommy Dorsey and his Orchestra
