= April Stevens =

American singer (1929–2023)

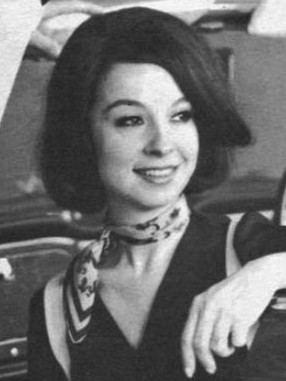
- Stevens in 1965

Background information
- Born: Caroline Vincinette LoTempio; April 29, 1929; Niagara Falls, New York, US
- Died: April 17, 2023 (aged 93) Scottsdale, Arizona, US
- Genres: Pop rock
- Occupation: Singer
- Years active: 1951–1990
- Labels: RCA Victor; Imperial; King; Atco
- Formerly of: Nino Tempo & April Stevens
- Website: ninoandapril.com

Caroline Vincinette LoTempio (April 29, 1929 – April 17, 2023), known professionally as April Stevens, was an American Grammy Award-winning singer of traditional pop, best known for her collaborations with her younger brother, Nino Tempo, as Nino Tempo & April Stevens. Stevens was an inductee in the Niagara Falls Music Hall of Fame

== Biography ==
=== Early life ===
Stevens was born in Niagara Falls, New York, as Caroline Vincinette LoTempio, to Samuel and Anna Lo Tempio, both descended from Italian immigrants from Sicily.

=== Music career ===
Stevens began her recording career in 1951, aged twenty-two. Her most popular solo recording was her RCA Victor rendition of "I'm in Love Again", written by Cole Porter. Accompanied by an orchestra arranged and conducted by Henri René, the song peaked at number 6 on the pop charts in 1951. Her follow-up, "Gimme a Little Kiss, Will Ya, Huh?", made it to number 10 later that year, and her next release, "And So to Sleep Again", hit #27.

Stevens returned to the US charts in 1959 with the song "Teach Me Tiger", which caused a minor uproar for its sexual suggestiveness and consequently did not receive airplay on many radio stations. The song peaked at No. 86 on the Billboard Hot 100.

Stevens was best known for her 1963 Atco recording of "Deep Purple" (music originally composed for piano by Peter DeRose and lyrics by Mitchell Parish) with her brother Antonino LoTempio (singing under the stage name Nino Tempo). A standard that Larry Clinton and his orchestra and band vocalist Bea Wain had popularized in 1939 and Bing Crosby also had a hit recording with, the Stevens and Tempo version reached no. 1 on the Hot 100 on November 16, 1963, and number 17 on the British chart. It featured an appearance by Glen Campbell, who played as a session musician. The song won the 1963 Grammy Award for Best Rock and Roll Recording. It sold over one million copies and was certified Gold. Nino and April never attained another number 1, as their style of jazz-influenced pop gave way to the British Invasion, especially the Beatles.

The duo enjoyed a 1964 follow-up hit in the US with the standard "Whispering" (music by Vincent Rose and lyrics by Richard Coburn and John Schonberger). The recording, which had an arrangement similar to their version of "Deep Purple", reached number 11 on the Hot 100 singles chart. They also had chart success with "All Strung Out", which reached number 26 on the American Hot 100 in 1966. Later that year, the single "The Coldest Night of the Year" was released on in the UK. In December 1967, Stevens issued a double-sided single of "Wanting You" with "Falling in Love Again". "Wanting You" became a Northern soul classic.

In the Netherlands, the duo enjoyed a No. 5 hit in early 1973 with their version of "(Where Do I Begin?) Love Story".

=== Autobiography ===
In her 2013 autobiography, Teach Me Tiger, Stevens said she was born in 1929. She admitted to taking years off her age, and her brother, Nino, going along with it. This was supposedly due to their competition with younger performers who already dominated the record charts in the 1960s.

=== Death ===
Stevens died in Scottsdale, Arizona on April 17, 2023, at the age of 93.

== Grammy Award ==
- 1963 — Nino Tempo & April Stevens' rendition of "Deep Purple" received a Grammy Award for Best Rock & Roll Recording.

== Discography ==
=== Albums ===
- Teach Me Tiger (1960)
- Alone (1985)
- A Very Special Time (1989)
- Carousel Dreams (1990)

=== Singles ===
Singles and chart positions
| Year | Titles (A-side, B-side) Both sides from same album except where indicated | US | Album |
|---|---|---|---|
| 1951 | "The Sweetest Day" b/w "Don't Do It" | | Non-album tracks |
| 1951 | "Dreamy Melody" b/w "Gimme a Little Kiss, Will Ya Huh?" | | A Nino Tempo-April Stevens Program |
| 1951 | "And So to Sleep Again" b/w "Aw, C'mon" | | Non-album tracks |
| 1951 | "Put Me in Your Pocket" b/w "The Tricks of the Trade" | | A Nino Tempo-April Stevens Program |
| 1952 | "That Naughty Waltz" b/w "I Like to Talk to Myself" | | Non-album tracks |
| 1953 | "Treat Me Nice" b/w "Hot Tamale" | | Non-album tracks |
| 1959 | "Teach Me Tiger" b/w "That Warm Afternoon" (Non-album track) | 86 | Teach Me Tiger |
| 1960 | "In Other Words" b/w "Jonny" (Non-album track) | | Teach Me Tiger |
| 1961 | "Love Kitten" b/w "You and Only You" | | Non-album tracks |
| 1962 | "That's My Name" b/w "Fly Me to the Moon" (Non-album track) | | Teach Me Tiger |
| 1963 | "Deep Purple" b/w "I've Been Carrying a Torch for You So Long (That I Burned a Great Big Hole in My Heart)" | 1 | Deep Purple |
| 1964 | "Whispering" b/w "Tweedlee Dee" | 11 | Nino and April Sing the Great Old Songs |
| 1965 | "Teach Me Tiger-1965" b/w "Morning Til' Midnight" | | Non-album tracks |
| 1965 | "No Hair Sam" b/w "Lovin' Valentine" | | Non-album tracks |
| 1966 | "All Strung Out" b/w "I Can't Go On Living Baby Without You" | 26 | Non-album tracks |
| 1967 | "Falling in Love Again" b/w "Wanting You" | | Non-album tracks |
| 1974 | "Wake Up and Love Me" b/w "Gotta Leave You Baby" | 93 | Non-album tracks |
| 1974 | "Won't You Marry Me Again" b/w "Gotta Leave You Baby" | | Non-album tracks |
