= Merry Christmas (Bing Crosby album) =

1945 compilation album by Bing Crosby

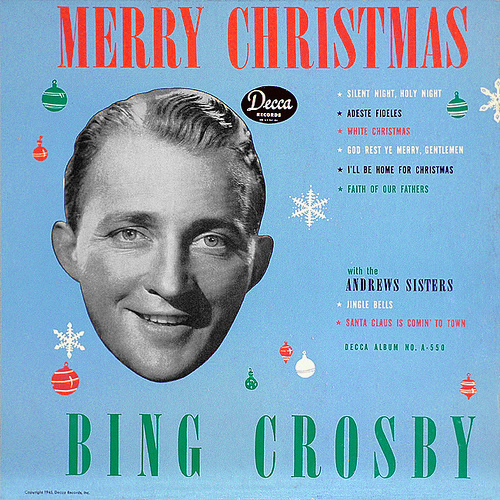

Compilation album by Bing Crosby
- Released: 1945 (original 78-rpm album); 1947 (re-release 78-rpm album); 1949 (original LP album); 1955 (re-designed LP album)
- Recorded: 1942, 1943, 1945, 1947, 1950, 1951
- Genre: Christmas
- Length: 27:24 (original 78-rpm album); 21:37 (re-release 78-rpm album); 32:57 (original LP album)
- Label: Decca

Bing Crosby chronology
Song Hits from Holiday Inn (w/ Fred Astaire) (1942)	Merry Christmas (1945)	Selections from Going My Way (1945)

White Christmas

Compilation album by Bing Crosby
- Released: Current reissue: 2014
- Label: Geffen, Universal

Professional ratings
Review scores
Source	Rating
AllMusic	4.5/5 stars

Merry Christmas is a Christmas-themed compilation album by Bing Crosby that was released in 1945 on Decca Records. It has remained in print through the vinyl, CD, and downloadable file eras, currently as the disc and digital album White Christmas on MCA Records, a part of the Universal Music Group, (reissued in June 1995) and currently on vinyl as Merry Christmas on Geffen Records (re-issued in September 2014). It includes Crosby's signature song "White Christmas", the best-selling single of all time with estimated sales of over 50 million copies worldwide. The album was certified 4× Platinum by RIAA for selling over 4 million copies in United States. The original 1945 release and subsequent re-releases and re-packages spent a total of 39 weeks at no. 1 on the Billboard pop albums chart.

== Content ==
The original album consisted of ten songs on five 78 records, all of which had been previously released. Each one had a holiday theme with the exception of "Danny Boy", paired with "I'll Be Home for Christmas" on its original record. Prior to the long-playing album era, such assemblies were not uncommon for popular music, Merry Christmas instigated by the enormous popularity of the "White Christmas" record. The 78 rpm album quickly reached the top of the Billboard Best-selling popular record albums chart in 1945 and remained there for several weeks.

Decca issued a second edition in this format in 1947, catalogue Decca A-550, consisting of four 78s, omitting recordings of "Danny Boy" and "Let's Start the New Year Right" from the previous release, and including new recordings of "White Christmas" and "Silent Night" from March 19, 1947. This recording of "White Christmas", heard on every subsequent pressing, is actually a re-recording of the song as, in an unprecedented occurrence, the 1942 master had actually worn out and was no longer usable. Decca and Crosby undertook the remake with the same orchestra and chorus, in an attempt to re-create the original May 1942 recording as closely as possible. The original recording of "White Christmas" to this date, has never been stamped on LP records or 45 rpm singles, but has appeared in a few holiday compilation albums on CD.

The 1955 vinyl LP configuration is the one extant to date, consisting of the entirety of Decca A-550 plus four additional tracks. The Andrews Sisters, often Crosby's recording partners in the 1940s, are featured on the tracks "Jingle Bells", "Mele Kalikimaka", and "Santa Claus Is Coming to Town". After the original cast recording to Oklahoma!, also from Decca Records, released in 1943, the 1955 album configuration has been continually in-print longer than any other album in the history of the United States.

== Release history ==
After the introduction of the LP by Columbia Records in 1948, its competitors in the music industry began switching over to the new format. Decca reissued the eight song Merry Christmas album in the form of a 10-inch LP in 1949, catalogue Decca DL-5019 with its standard brown label. The original 78 rpm album cover (seen above) had a light blue background and showed a large black and white photograph of Crosby's head. This was the same cover design that had been used on all issues of the 78 rpm album. Copies released after 1951 featured a newly designed red and green cover.

Merry Christmas was also issued as a 45 rpm box set in 1950, catalogue Decca 9-65. It had the same basic cover with a new yellow background and the same four singles as the 78 rpm album A-550, and the individual records had the same catalog numbers, in this case preceded by the "9-" prefix. In 1952, the 45 rpm box was discontinued, replaced by a 2-EP set, catalogue Decca ED 547. This had the same cover as the second version of the 10-inch LP; each 7-inch single had two songs per side, and the sides were numbered 91123 and 91124, respectively.

When Decca (and the rest of the industry) abandoned the 10-inch LP format in 1955, it created a 12-inch LP version of Merry Christmas, catalogue Decca DL-8128, with four additional songs and the now-familiar cover with Crosby in his Santa Claus stocking cap as pictured above. The new songs were "Silver Bells" and "Mele Kalikimaka", both recorded in September 1950, and "It's Beginning to Look a Lot Like Christmas" and "Christmas in Killarney", both recorded on October 1, 1951. The album's track listing was also adjusted slightly, with "Faith of Our Fathers" now preceding "I'll Be Home for Christmas". This issue has remained unchanged to present; first pressings of the album were released on Decca's all-black label with the catalog number in the top left corner of the front cover. This album was exactly duplicated for the 2014 re-issue by Geffen Records.

In 1963, the album was made available in electronically re-channeled stereo (with Decca's moniker, "Enhanced for Stereo" added on the upper right corner of the cover), Decca DL-78128. Mono copies made after the introduction of stereo have "DL-8128" in the bottom left corner of the front cover. All copies from the 1960s feature the Decca rainbow label. The mono version was temporarily deleted in 1968. The re-channeled stereo mixes are considered by many to be inferior due to the addition of artificial reverb, giving the once intimate-sounding "dry" original masters a "concert-hall" sound. The reverb is particularly intrusive on tracks such as "Adeste Fideles", "White Christmas", and "Silver Bells".

In 1973, after MCA merged all their labels (Decca, Uni, Kapp) to one corporate name, MCA Records, the album received a new catalogue number, MCA 167. This version was only available for a short time. Eventually, MCA chose to create a new numbering series for its reissued Christmas albums, and Merry Christmas was assigned MCA 15024. This exists on the black with rainbow, tan, and blue with rainbow labels. Cassette releases (MCAC 15024) at this time had the tracks on each side stay on their correct side, but reordered, so “White Christmas” came after “Silent Night” while “Adeste Fideles” was moved to the 5th position above “I’ll Be Home For Christmas” (Faith and God Rest Ye just flipped their respective order, with Faith moving up to follow “White Christmas”). On Side 2, “Christmas In Killarney” followed “Jingle Bells”, “Santa Claus Is Coming To Town” moved to the 5th spot above “Mele Kalikimaka” (surprisingly, “Silver Bells” and “It’s Beginning…” stayed in their 1955 order). While the initial MCA pressings were in re-channeled stereo (as on the post-1963 Decca issues), the original "dry" mono mixes were restored to several of the later MCA pressings – most notably on the blue with rainbow labels.

In 1986, Merry Christmas was transferred to compact disc, MCAD-31143 and included these same twelve songs in their original mono mixes. Universal Music Group (successor to MCA Records) changed the name of the album to White Christmas, keeping the contents and the catalogue number unchanged. A new mono re-master was made in 1992 and reissued in 1995. It was further reissued in 1998, now with catalogue number B0017220-02. This is the one available at present. Note that it still says MCAD 31143 on the disc.

Notes regarding European versions: In 1970, the re-channeled stereo version of Merry Christmas was released on vinyl as White Christmas on the Coral label with catalogue number COPS 1011. In 1987, this version was transferred to compact disc on the MCA label with catalogue number 255 199-2. In 1991, it was reissued (possibly remastered) with catalogue number MCD30195, and later on with catalogue number MCD 18226.

The entire album over time, minus the songs "Faith of Our Fathers" and "Danny Boy" (which was only on the 1945 original album) can be found on the 1998 double-disc Bing Crosby: The Voice of Christmas, a compendium of all of Crosby's Christmas recordings for Decca from 1935 to 1956. The original 1942 recording of "White Christmas", and a previously unreleased alternate take of said recording, are also found on the compilation.

On August 29, 2008, the "White Christmas" album was re-issued as a "Collector's Edition" by Madacy Special Products. This issue featured the original album's 12 tracks in a slightly different order and added two additional tracks ("Rudolph the Red-Nosed Reindeer" and "Here Comes Santa Claus"). The album was packaged in a collectible tin along with the Special Edition DVD of the 1942 film Holiday Inn. This version of the album, unfortunately, has noticeably inferior sound quality as opposed to the 12-track MCA CD release of the same name – possibly because Madacy used the rechanneled stereo mixes for many of the tracks instead of the more contained, and intimate sounding mono originals.

On September 30, 2014, the album was reissued on a newly remastered LP by Geffen Records and Universal Music Enterprises. This limited edition mono reissue faithfully reproduces the newly designed 1955 LP, right down to the album jacket artwork (which restores the original "Merry Christmas" title) and the period-appropriate black Decca label on the vinyl record.

A white vinyl version of the above album released in 2014 was re-mastered and re-released in a Walmart-exclusive limited edition format in time for the 2019 Christmas season. It sold out quickly to flippers and now commands two-to-four times its $17.99 list price in the online marketplaces.

== Track list ==
=== Original 78 rpm album (1945) ===
The 1945 album issue Decca A-403 consisted of these previously issued 78 rpm records:

Side / Title	Writer(s)	Recording date	Performed with	Time
Disc 1 (18510):
A. "Silent Night"	Joseph Mohr, Franz Xaver Gruber	June 8, 1942	John Scott Trotter and His Orchestra and Max Terr's Mixed Chorus	2:40
B. "Adeste Fideles"	Frederick Oakeley, John Francis Wade	June 8, 1942	John Scott Trotter and His Orchestra and Max Terr's Mixed Chorus	3:08
Disc 2 (18429):
A. "White Christmas"	Irving Berlin	May 29, 1942	Ken Darby Singers and John Scott Trotter and His Orchestra	2:58
B. "Let's Start the New Year Right"	Irving Berlin	May 25, 1942	Bob Crosby and His Orchestra	2:33
Disc 3 (18570):
A. "I'll Be Home for Christmas"	Buck Ram, James Kimble Gannon, Walter Kent	October 1, 1943	John Scott Trotter and His Orchestra	2:34
B. "Danny Boy"	Frederic Weatherly	July 5, 1941	John Scott Trotter and His Orchestra	3:11
Disc 4 (18511):
A. "Faith of Our Fathers"	Frederick William Faber	June 8, 1942	John Scott Trotter and His Orchestra and Max Terr's Mixed Chorus	2:52
B. "God Rest Ye Merry Gentlemen"	Traditional	June 8, 1942	John Scott Trotter and His Orchestra and Max Terr's Mixed Chorus	2:16
Disc 5 (23281):
A. "Jingle Bells"	James Lord Pierpont	September 27, 1943	The Andrews Sisters and Vic Schoen and His Orchestra	2:33
B. "Santa Claus Is Coming to Town"	J. Fred Coots, Haven Gillespie	September 27, 1943	The Andrews Sisters and Vic Schoen and His Orchestra	2:39

=== Reissued 78 rpm album (1947) ===
The 1947 album issue Decca A-550, the top picture, consisted of these 78 rpm records, and with the exception of the two remakes, all were reissues of the earlier recordings.

Side / Title	Writer(s)	Recording date	Performed with	Time
Disc 1 (23777):
A. "Silent Night"	Joseph Mohr, Franz Xaver Gruber	March 19, 1947	John Scott Trotter and His Orchestra and the Ken Darby Singers	2:34
B. "Adeste Fideles"	Frederick Oakeley, John Francis Wade	June 8, 1942	John Scott Trotter and His Orchestra and Max Terr's Mixed Chorus	3:08
Disc 2 (23778):
A. "White Christmas"	Irving Berlin	March 19, 1947	John Scott Trotter and His Orchestra and the Ken Darby Singers	3:01
B. "God Rest Ye Merry Gentlemen"	Traditional	June 8, 1942	John Scott Trotter and His Orchestra and Max Terr's Mixed Chorus	2:16
Disc 3 (23779):
A. "I'll Be Home for Christmas"	Buck Ram, James Kimble Gannon, Walter Kent	October 1, 1943	John Scott Trotter and His Orchestra	2:34
B. "Faith of Our Fathers"	Frederick William Faber	June 8, 1942	John Scott Trotter and His Orchestra and Max Terr's Mixed Chorus	2:52
Disc 4 (23281):
A. "Jingle Bells"	James Lord Pierpont	September 27, 1943	The Andrews Sisters and Vic Schoen and His Orchestra	2:33
B. "Santa Claus Is Coming to Town"	J. Fred Coots, Haven Gillespie	September 27, 1943	The Andrews Sisters and Vic Schoen and His Orchestra	2:39

The additional tracks were issued as 78 rpm and 45 rpm singles in 1950 and 1951 respectively:

- "Mele Kalikimaka" (Decca 27228) (Decca L-5830)
- "Silver Bells" (Decca 27229) (Decca L-5832)
- "Christmas in Killarney" / "It's Beginning to Look a Lot Like Christmas" (Decca 27831) (Decca L-6462 and L-6463)

=== 33 rpm LP (1955) ===
Recording dates follow song titles. This track listing is used to this day on digital releases.

Side one
No.	Title	Writer(s)	Performed with	Length
1.	"Silent Night" (March 19, 1947)	Joseph Mohr, Franz Xaver Gruber	John Scott Trotter and His Orchestra and the Ken Darby Singers	2:34
2.	"Adeste Fideles" (June 8, 1942)	Frederick Oakeley, John Francis Wade	John Scott Trotter and His Orchestra and Max Terr's Mixed Chorus	3:08
3.	"White Christmas" (March 19, 1947)	Irving Berlin	John Scott Trotter and His Orchestra and the Ken Darby Singers	3:01
4.	"God Rest Ye Merry Gentlemen" (June 8, 1942)	Traditional	John Scott Trotter and His Orchestra and Max Terr's Mixed Chorus	2:16
5.	"Faith of Our Fathers" (June 8, 1942)	Frederick William Faber	John Scott Trotter and His Orchestra and Max Terr's Mixed Chorus	2:52
6.	"I'll Be Home for Christmas" (October 1, 1943)	Buck Ram, James Kimble Gannon, Walter Kent	John Scott Trotter and His Orchestra	2:34

Side two
No.	Title	Writer(s)	Performed with	Length
1.	"Jingle Bells" (September 27, 1943)	James Lord Pierpont	The Andrews Sisters and Vic Schoen and His Orchestra	2:33
2.	"Santa Claus Is Coming to Town" (September 27, 1943)	J. Fred Coots, Haven Gillespie	The Andrews Sisters and Vic Schoen and His Orchestra	2:39
3.	"Silver Bells" (September 8, 1950)	Jay Livingston, Ray Evans	Carol Richards and John Scott Trotter and His Orchestra	3:02
4.	"It's Beginning to Look a Lot Like Christmas" (October 1, 1951)	Meredith Willson	John Scott Trotter and His Orchestra and with Jud Conlon's Rhythmaires	2:44
5.	"Christmas in Killarney" (October 1, 1951)	John Redmond, James Cavanaugh and Frank Weldon	John Scott Trotter and His Orchestra and Jud Conlon's Rhythmaires	2:42
6.	"Mele Kalikimaka" (September 7, 1950)	Robert Alexander Anderson	The Andrews Sisters and Vic Schoen and His Orchestra	2:52

=== Delta's White Christmas CD (1992) ===
Delta Music also released an album in 1992 on the LaserLight label titled White Christmas often confused with the newer Decca imprint.

1. "The Christmas Song"
2. "Jingle Bells"
3. "Silent Night, Holy Night"
4. "God Rest Ye Merry Gentlemen" (with Max Terr's Mixed Chorus and John Scott Trotter and His Orchestra)
5. "Let It Snow, Let It Snow, Let It Snow"
6. "I'll Be Home for Christmas"
7. "Adeste Fideles" (with Max Terr's Mixed Chorus and John Scott Trotter and His Orchestra)
8. "White Christmas"
9. "Joy to the World"
10. "The First Noel"
11. "Good King Wenceslas"
12. "Away in a Manger" (with Paul Weston's Orchestra and Norman Luboff Choir)
13. "Deck the Halls"
14. "O Little Town of Bethlehem"
15. "Silver Bells" (with Carol Richards, the Lee Gordon Singers and John Scott Trotter and His Orchestra)

== Charts ==
Chart performance for Merry Christmas/White Christmas
Chart (1977–2026)	Peak position
Austrian Albums (Ö3 Austria)	42
Belgian Albums (Ultratop Flanders)	72
Belgian Albums (Ultratop Wallonia)	167
Canadian Albums (Billboard)	4
Danish Albums (Hitlisten)	21
Dutch Albums (Album Top 100)	18
Finnish Albums (Suomen virallinen lista)	36
German Albums (Offizielle Top 100)	39
Hungarian Albums (MAHASZ)	22
Latvian Albums (LaIPA)	19
Lithuanian Albums (AGATA)	13
Norwegian Albums (VG-lista)	20
Portuguese Albums (AFP)	65
Swedish Albums (Sverigetopplistan)	10
Swiss Albums (Schweizer Hitparade)	32
US Billboard 200	27

== Certifications ==
Certifications for Merry Christmas
Region	Certification	Certified units/sales
Netherlands (NVPI) White Christmas	Gold	50,000^{^}
United Kingdom (BPI) White Christmas	Silver	60,000^{^}
United States (RIAA) Merry Christmas	Gold	500,000^{^}
United States (RIAA) White Christmas	4× Platinum	4,000,000^{^}
^{^} Shipments figures based on certification alone.

== See also ==
- Christmas Greetings (album)
- White Christmas (soundtrack)
- I Wish You a Merry Christmas
