= Pale Moon (disambiguation) =

Pale Moon is an open-source web browser.

Pale Moon or Palemoon may also refer to:

- "Pale Moon" (song), a popular 1920 song composed by Frederic Knight Logan with lyrics by Jesse G. M. Glick recorded by many singers
- Pale Moon (film), a 2014 Japanese film
- Pale Moon, an activist who inspired legislation for Native American Indian Heritage Month
- Pale Moon, a seasonal pale ale by Blue Moon brewery, later renamed to Rounder
- Hannah Palemoon, a fictional character in the Left Behind series
- Pale Moon (TV series), a 2023 South Korean television series

== See also ==
- Pale Moon Ebony (Diospyros malabarica), a species of flowering tree native to the Indian Subcontinent and South East Asia
