= Crosstown (Glenn Miller song) =

1940 RCA Bluebird 78 single, B-10832-A, by Glenn Miller and His Orchestra.

"Crosstown" is a 1940 song recorded by Glenn Miller and His Orchestra. The song was written by James Cavanaugh, John Redmond, and Nat Simon.

== Background ==
"Crosstown" was released as an RCA Bluebird 78 single in 1940 by Glenn Miller and His Orchestra featuring Jack Lathrop on vocals. The single reached no. 9 on the Billboard pop singles chart in a single-week chart appearance. The B side was "What's Your Story, Morning Glory?"

== Album Appearances ==
The recording appeared on the 2005 Avid Entertainment collection Glenn Miller: The Glenn Miller Story, Vols. 9-10 and the 1991 RCA Bluebird compilation box set The Complete Glenn Miller and His Orchestra (1938-1942).

== Sources ==
- Flower, John (1972). Moonlight Serenade: a bio-discography of the Glenn Miller Civilian Band. New Rochelle, NY: Arlington House. ISBN 0-87000-161-2.
- Miller, Glenn (1943). Glenn Miller's Method for Orchestral Arranging. New York: Mutual Music Society. ASIN: B0007DMEDQ
- Simon, George Thomas (1980). Glenn Miller and His Orchestra. New York: Da Capo paperback. ISBN 0-306-80129-9.
- Simon, George Thomas (1971). Simon Says. New York: Galahad. ISBN 0-88365-001-0.
- Schuller, Gunther (1991). Volume 2 of The Swing Era:the Development of Jazz, 1930–1945 /. New York: Oxford University Press. ISBN 0-19-507140-9.
