= Groovin' High =

1945 jazz standard by Dizzy Gillespie

Song by Dizzy Gillespie

from the album Dizzy Gillespie and His All-Stars
- Released: March 1947
- Recorded: February 9, 1945
- Genre: Jazz; bebop
- Length: 2:38
- Label: Musicraft
- Songwriter: Dizzy Gillespie

"Groovin' High" is a 1945 jazz song by trumpeter and composer Dizzy Gillespie. The song was a bebop mainstay that became a jazz standard, one of Gillespie's best known hits, and according to Bebop: The Music and Its Players author Thomas Owens, it was "the first famous bebop recording".

It is a complex musical arrangement based on the chord structure of a 1920 standard originally recorded by Paul Whiteman, "Whispering", composed by Vincent Rose with lyrics by John Schonberger and Richard Coburn. The biography Dizzy characterizes the song as "a pleasant medium-tempo tune" that "demonstrates ... [Gillespie's] skill in fashioning interesting textures using only six instruments".

It has been used to title many compilation albums and also the 2001 biography Groovin' High: The Life of Dizzy Gillespie.

== Impact ==
The song appeared on the debut 1947 album, Dizzy Gillespie and His All Stars and is one of eight tracks on that album that, according to jazz critic Scott Yanow, "shocked" Gillespie's contemporaries, contributing to the album "permanently [changing] ... jazz and (indirectly) the entire music world". In Jazz: A Regional Exploration, Yanow explained that at the time, such songs "were unprecedented ... displaying a radically different language" from contemporary swing. Although fans and fellow musicians found the material "very strange and difficult", The Sax & Brass Book notes that they were quickly adopted as classics. According to Yanow, "[Charlie] Parker and Gillespie's solos seemed to have little relation to the melody, but they were connected. It was a giant step forward for jazz."

Thomas Owens highlighted the innovative use of source material, pointing out that while it was not uncommon for jazz musicians to utilize existing chord structures in their compositions in 1945, Gillespie's "melodic contrafact was the most complex jazz melody superimposed on a pre-existing chordal scheme" and "atypically elaborate".

== Performance history ==
First performed on February 9, 1945, Gillespie reworked the arrangement for a February 28 performance to allow an improvisation by guitarist Remo Palmier, and it is this reworking that became so well known.

In the book Yardbird Suite, music historian Lawrence O. Koch sets forth in detail the structure of the song as performed on December 29, 1945, and preserved by Armed Forces Radio Service, from the two-bar unison figure by Gillespie and Charlie Parker that opens the song to the Gillespie coda at the end. Not having to conform to 78 rpm technology, Gillespie and his band were able to add several minutes to the song during that performance. Koch praised the "lovely, logical, melodic construction" of Parker's 16-bar solo as well as singling out performances by Gillespie, Slam Stewart, and Palmieri, as commendable. Noting that the coda "has become a jazz cliché, both in its melody and the chord pattern from which the melody was derived", he also drew attention to Gillespie's "prima donna breath control" on the final E-flat, with only a "slight loss in intonation" in spite of the difficulty of the phrase. The book Charlie Parker: His Music and Life describes this performance, along with the three other songs played in that session, as capturing "much of the vitality of the early Gillespie-Parker partnership".

Other notable performances of the song took place on September 29, 1947, when Parker and Gillespie reunited in concert at Carnegie Hall and during a 1956 tour sponsored by the US State Department. Owens describes the 1947 recording as among the finest of Parker's career. During the 1956 tour, Gillespie simultaneously performed "Groovin' High" and "Whispering" to demonstrate the way jazz musicians build on the bones of earlier compositions.

== Inspiration ==
According to the book Visions of Jazz: The First Century by critic Gary Giddins, Gillespie once recounted that he believed the song had been inspired by a film serial he saw at a matinée as a child that used the song "Whispering" as its theme. Gillespie offered no details about the serial, except that he believed it might have starred stuntman and rodeo rider Yakima Canutt.

== Albums named for the song ==
There are at least 11 different albums in the Gillespie discography alone named Groovin' High, compilations that include the song along with other notable tracks that Gillespie performed. In addition, several compilations have been released under this title in Parker's name.

=== Gillespie albums ===
- Groovin' High (Bandstand): "Although not essential, there are some very interesting performances on this boppish CD." – Scott Yanow.
- Groovin' High (Collectables): "It all makes for a rather mixed bag and doesn't make a particularly good introduction to Gillespie, although it does jarringly show some of the extremes in the Diz legacy." – Steve Leggett.
- Groovin' High (Drive, 1994): Re-issue of the Collectables releases.
- Groovin' High (Drive, 1999)
- Groovin' High (Eclipse): "As it's a discount album..., it's a wonderful addition to the collection of any Gillespie fan."
- Groovin' High (High Definition Classics)
- Groovin' High (Indigo): "Fans of this style of jazz likely already have all of this classic material, but as a stocking stuffer or birthday present for a fledgling young jazz fan, this would work well." – Michael G. Nastos.
- Groovin' High (Jazz Hour)
- Groovin' High (Living End): "It serves as a fine introduction to one of jazz's great innovators." – Thom Jurek.
- Groovin' High (Naxos): "This Naxos historical jazz collection fulfills a crying need, succinctly summing up a critical slice of time where bebop is concerned." – Richard S. Ginell.
- Groovin' High (Prism Records 205) ASIN B0000259BG, 25 tracks, 74 minutes
- Groovin' High (Savoy): "Certainly filled with classic music, but this is a so-so, lightweight reissue...because there are only 13 selections..., the liner notes are dated and breezy, and the complete sessions are not included." – Scott Yanow.

=== Charlie Parker albums ===
- Groovin' High (BCI)
- Groovin' High (Fabulous)
- Groovin' High (Jazz Time)
- Groovin' High (K-Tel)
- Groovin' High (Total Recording)

=== Other albums ===
- Dancing Mood, Groovin' High (Sonopress)
- Booker Ervin, Groovin' High (Prestige, 1966)

== See also ==
- List of jazz contrafacts
