= Cherchez La Femme =

1976 single by Dr. Buzzard's Original Savannah Band

"Whispering/Cherchez La Femme/Se Si Bon"

Single by Dr. Buzzard's Original Savannah Band

from the album Dr. Buzzard's Original Savannah Band
- A-side: "Whispering/Cherchez La Femme/Se Si Bon"
- B-side: "Sunshower (U.S.)"
- Released: 1976
- Recorded: House of Music, West Orange, New Jersey, 1976
- Genre: Disco, pop, big band
- Length: 5:46 (album version); 3:33 (7" single)
- Label: RCA Records
- Songwriters: Stony Browder Jr. (Music); August Darnell (Lyrics), John Schonberger, Richard Coburn, Vincent Rose
- Producer: Sandy Linzer

Dr. Buzzard's Original Savannah Band singles chronology
"I'll Play the Fool" (1976)	"Whispering/Cherchez La Femme/Se Si Bon" (1976)	"Sour and Sweet" (1976)

"Cherchez La Femme" (French for Seek the woman) is a song that was written and performed by Dr. Buzzard's Original Savannah Band with lead vocals by Cory Daye in 1976. The music was written by band-leader and pianist Stony Browder Jr. and John Schonberger, Richard Coburn (né Frank Reginald DeLong; 1886–1952), and Vincent Rose; with lyrics by Browder Jr.'s brother and bassist August Darnell. The song's full title is "Whispering"/"Cherchez La Femme"/"Se Si Bon" [sic]. "Cherchez La Femme" became the group's biggest hit.

The song's opening lyric refers to record executive Tommy Mottola, who was instrumental in giving the act their major label deal. Along with the tracks "Sour and Sweet" and "I'll Play the Fool", "Cherchez La Femme" went to #1 on the disco chart. "Cherchez La Femme" also charted on the pop, R&B, and Adult Contemporary charts.

== Track listing ==
7" Single

1. "Whispering" / "Cherchez La Femme" / "Se Si Bon" - 3:33
2. "Sunshower" - 4:02

== Charts ==
=== Weekly charts ===
Chart (1976–1977)	Peak position
Australia	49
Belgium (Ultratop 50 Flanders)	2
Canada Top Singles (RPM)	23
Canada Adult Contemporary (RPM)	18
Netherlands (Dutch Top 40)	3
Netherlands (Single Top 100)	2
US Billboard Hot 100	27
US Disco Action Top 30 (Billboard)	1
US Easy Listening (Billboard)	22
US Hot Soul Singles (Billboard)	31

=== Year-end charts ===
Chart (1977)	Position
Belgium (Ultratop Flanders)	75
Canada (RPM)	168
Netherlands (Dutch Top 40)	12
Netherlands (Single Top 100)	20
U.S. Billboard Hot 100	91

== Gloria Estefan version ==
"Cherchez La Femme"

Single by Gloria Estefan

from the album Hold Me, Thrill Me, Kiss Me
- Released: May 1995 (USA); June 1995 (Europe)
- Recorded: 1993–1994
- Genre: Dance-pop
- Length: 4:58
- Label: Epic
- Songwriters: Stony Browder Jr. August Darnell
- Producers: Emilio Estefan Jr. Lawrence Dermer

Gloria Estefan singles chronology
"It's Too Late" (1995)	"Cherchez La Femme" (1995)	"Abriendo Puertas" (1995)

"Cherchez La Femme" was covered by Cuban American singer-songwriter Gloria Estefan on her fourth studio album, Hold Me, Thrill Me, Kiss Me. It was released as the fifth single from the album in the US, Australia and Benelux.

=== Critical reception ===
Pan-European magazine Music & Media commented, "In 1977, romantic couples took the floor every time Dr. Buzzard's Original Savannah Band was played. Now another "femme" is singing the nostalgic swing band song with equal joy." Phil Shanklin of ReviewsRevues wrote in his review of the Hold Me, Thrill Me, Kiss Me album, that it is "a brave move" to cover the song. He added, "Gloria’ s vocal lacks the playful coquettishness of Cory Daye’s but it is great to hear it again amongst her selections of songs."

=== Track listings ===
U.S. Promo 12" Vinyl Single #1 (EAS 7084) [May 1995]
No.	Title	Writer(s)	Length
1.	"Cherchez La Femme" (Ballroom Vocal Mix)	August Darnell, Stony Browder Jr.	7:29
2.	"Cherchez La Femme" ("Femme Fatale" Club Mix)	August Darnell, Stony Browder Jr.	8:24
3.	"Cherchez La Femme" (Doom Dub)	August Darnell, Stony Browder Jr.	8:16
4.	"Cherchez La Femme" (Piano Mix)	August Darnell, Stony Browder Jr.	6:39

U.S. Promo 12" Vinyl Single #2 (AED 7219) [May 1995]
No.	Title	Writer(s)	Length
1.	"Cherchez La Femme" (THE GStyle And DJ WT MIX)	August Darnell, Stony Browder Jr.	8:16
2.	"Cherchez La Femme" (THE Gary Q MIX)	August Darnell, Stony Browder Jr.	7:00
3.	"Cherchez La Femme" (THE Danny C. And Giuseppe D. MIX)	August Darnell, Stony Browder Jr.	6:30
4.	"Cherchez La Femme" (THE Marc "DJ Stew" Pirrone DUB)	August Darnell, Stony Browder Jr.	6:10
5.	"Cherchez La Femme" (THE Charley Casanova MIX)	August Darnell, Stony Browder Jr.	5:38

Europe CD Single (EPC 662039 1) [June 1995]
No.	Title	Writer(s)	Length
1.	"Cherchez La Femme" (Album Version)	August Darnell, Stony Browder Jr.	4:58
2.	"Cherchez La Femme" (Piano Mix)	August Darnell, Stony Browder Jr.	6:39

Europe CD-Maxi Single (EPC 662039 2) [June 1995]
No.	Title	Writer(s)	Length
1.	"Cherchez La Femme" (Album Version)	August Darnell, Stony Browder Jr.	4:58
2.	"Cherchez La Femme" (Ballroom Vocal Mix)	August Darnell, Stony Browder Jr.	7:29
3.	"Cherchez La Femme" ("Femme Fatale" Club Mix)	August Darnell, Stony Browder Jr.	8:24
4.	"Cherchez La Femme" (Radio Club Mix)	August Darnell, Stony Browder Jr.	4:55
5.	"Cherchez La Femme" (Alternate Radio Club Mix)	August Darnell, Stony Browder Jr.	3:54

U.K. CD-Maxi Single (It's Too Late / Cherchez La Femme) [Cancelled / Unreleased] {662044 2} (June 12, 1995)
No.	Title	Writer(s)	Length
1.	"It's Too Late" (Radio Mix)	Carole King, Toni Stern	3:19
2.	"It's Too Late" (Piano Mix)	Carole King, Toni Stern	3:58
3.	"Cherchez La Femme" (Radio Club Mix)	August Darnell, Stony Browder Jr.	3:54
4.	"Cherchez La Femme" (Album Version)	August Darnell, Stony Browder Jr.	4:58

U.K. Promo 12" Vinyl Single (XPR 2178) [June 1995]
No.	Title	Writer(s)	Length
1.	"Cherchez La Femme" (Ballroom Vocal Mix)	August Darnell, Stony Browder Jr.	7:29
2.	"Cherchez La Femme" (Piano Mix)	August Darnell, Stony Browder Jr.	6:39
3.	"Cherchez La Femme" (Doom Dub)	August Darnell, Stony Browder Jr.	8:16
4.	"Cherchez La Femme" ("Femme Fatale" Club Mix)	August Darnell, Stony Browder Jr.	8:24

Australia CD-Maxi Single (It's Too Late / Cherchez La Femme) [662020 2] {June 1995}
No.	Title	Writer(s)	Length
1.	"It's Too Late" (Radio Mix)	Carole King, Toni Stern	3:19
2.	"It's Too Late" (Album Version)	Carole King, Toni Stern	3:57
3.	"It's Too Late" (Piano Mix)	Carole King, Toni Stern	3:58
4.	"Cherchez La Femme" (Doom Dub)	August Darnell, Stony Browder Jr.	8:17
5.	"Cherchez La Femme" (Piano Mix)	August Darnell, Stony Browder Jr.	6:41

=== Official versions ===
Original Versions

1. Album Version — (4:58)

Pablo Flores & Jose "Pepe" Ojeda Remixes

1. Radio Club Mix — (4:55)
2. Alternative Radio Club Mix — (3:54)
3. "Femme Fatale" Club Mix — (8:24)

Ronnie Ventura Remixes

1. Piano Mix — (6:39)
2. Doom Dub — (8:16)
3. Ballroom Vocal Mix — (7:29)

Remixes

1. The GStyle & DJ WT Mix — (8:16)
2. The Gary Q Mix — (7:00)
3. The Danny C. & Giuseppe G. Mix — (6:30)
4. The Marc "DJ Stew" Pirrone Dub — (5:10)
5. The Charley Casanova Mix — (5:38)

=== Charts ===
Chart (1995)	Peak position
Australia (ARIA)	124
US Hot Dance Music/Club Play (Billboard)	19

== See also ==
- Cherchez la femme (saying)
