= Dr. Buzzard's Original Savannah Band Goes to Washington =

Studio album by Dr. Buzzard's Original Savannah Band
- Released: 1979
- Genre: Disco, big band, soul
- Length: 32:00
- Label: Elektra
- Producer: Stony Browder Jr., Gary Klein, David Wolfert

Dr. Buzzard's Original Savannah Band chronology
Dr. Buzzard's Original Savannah Band Meets King Penett (1978)	Dr. Buzzard's Original Savannah Band Goes to Washington (1979)	Calling All Beatniks! (1984)

Dr. Buzzard's Original Savannah Band Goes to Washington is the third studio album by Dr. Buzzard's Original Savannah Band. It was the last album recorded by the original line-up. The album was a commercial failure, not making the top 100 on either the Pop or the R&B chart.

The album's full title is James Monroe H.S. Presents Dr. Buzzard's Original Savannah Band Goes to Washington.

== Critical reception ==
Professional ratings
Review scores
Source	Rating
AllMusic	3/5 stars
Bay State Banner	A
Christgau's Record Guide	A−
The Rolling Stone Album Guide	3.5/5 stars
Spin Alternative Record Guide	7/10

The Washington Post wrote: "Stony Browder captures the cosmopolitan richness of a big city on the record as he mixes black, white and Latin musics from the '40s, '60s and '70s. 'Call Me' makes the unlikely ingredients of Beach Boys harmonies, Latin rhumba, synthesizer effects and dixieland clarinet blend seamlessly. Browder composes so imaginatively that the 'chinka-chinka' beat that underlies almost every cut is relegated to the subconscious. One can dance to these songs with the brain going numb."

The Rolling Stone Album Guide wrote that the album "recaptures the insouciant buzz of the debut—and adds a dose of social reality."

== Track listing ==
All lyrics are written by August Darnell; all music is composed by Stony Browder Jr.

Side one
No.	Title	Length
1.	"Didn't I Love You Girl?"	5:18
2.	"Call Me"	3:44
3.	"New York at Dawn"	4:26
4.	"R.S.V.P. (Réspondez S'Il Vous Plait)"	3:11

Side two
No.	Title	Length
1.	"The Seven Year Itch"	4:41
2.	"Once There Was a Coloured Girl..."	4:26
3.	"Italiano"	6:05

== Personnel ==
- Cory Daye – vocals
- Stony Browder Jr. – guitar, piano, vocals, producer
- August Darnell – bass, vocals
- "Sugar Coated" Andy Hernandez – vibes, marimba
- Mickey Sevilla – drums, percussion
- David Wolfert – producer
- Gary Klein – producer
- John Arrias – engineer
- Charles Koppelman – executive producer
