= Dr. Buzzard's Original Savannah Band (album) =

Studio album by Dr. Buzzard's Original Savannah Band
- Released: 1976
- Recorded: February 2, 1976 – March 4, 1976
- Genres: Disco, big band, soul
- Length: 34:08
- Label: RCA
- Producer: Sandy Linzer

Dr. Buzzard's Original Savannah Band chronology
Dr. Buzzard's Original Savannah Band (1976)	Dr. Buzzard's Original Savannah Band Meets King Penett (1978)

Singles from Dr. Buzzard's Original Savannah Band
- 1. "Cherchez La Femme" Released: October 23, 1976

Professional ratings
Review scores
Source	Rating
AllMusic	4.5/5 stars
Christgau's Record Guide	A
The Rolling Stone Album Guide	4/5 stars
Spin Alternative Record Guide	9/10

Dr. Buzzard's Original Savannah Band is the debut studio album by Dr. Buzzard's Original Savannah Band. It was released in 1976 by RCA. It peaked at number 22 on the Billboard 200 chart and number 31 on the Top R&B Albums chart.

In his book Turn the Beat Around: The Secret History of Disco, music writer Peter Shapiro described the album as "one of the most fully realized, dazzling artifacts from the black bohemian intelligentsia".

== Track listing ==
All tracks are written by August Darnell and Stony Browder Jr., except "Night and Day" written by Cole Porter.

Side one
No.	Title	Length
1.	"I'll Play the Fool"	4:47
2.	"Hard Times"	4:09
3.	"Whispering/Cherchez La Femme/Se Si Bon"	5:46
4.	"Sunshower"	4:02

Side two
No.	Title	Length
1.	"We Got It Made/Night and Day"	3:45
2.	"You've Got Something/Betcha' the Love Bug Bitcha'"	5:38
3.	"Sour and Sweet/Lemon in the Honey"	6:01

== Personnel ==
- Cory Daye – vocals
- Don Armando Bonilla – percussion
- Stony Browder – guitar, keyboards, vocals
- August Darnell – bass, vocals
- Andy "Coati Mundi" Hernandez – percussion
- Mickey Sevilla – drums

== Charts ==
Chart performance for Dr. Buzzard's Original Savannah Band
Chart (1976–1977)	Peak position
Australian Albums (Kent Music Report)	39
Canada Top Albums/CDs (RPM)	87
Dutch Albums (Album Top 100)	13
US Billboard 200	22
US Top R&B Albums (Billboard)	31
