= I'd Do It All Over Again =

"I'd Do It All Over Again" is a hit 1945 song by Dick Robertson, Frank Weldon and James Cavanaugh. It was recorded by the orchestras of Hal McIntyre and again by Frankie Carle.
