= Deep Purple (song) =

1933 song by Peter DeRose

Composition by Peter DeRose
- Published: 1933 by Robbins Music
- Composer: Peter DeRose
- Lyricist: Mitchell Parish (added 1938)

"Deep Purple" is a song and the biggest hit written by pianist Peter DeRose, who broadcast between 1923 and 1939 with May Singhi as "The Sweethearts of the Air" on the NBC radio network, in 1933. The British rock band Deep Purple named themselves after the song.

Paul Whiteman recorded and released the original version of the song in 1934 as an instrumental.

== Origin ==
"Deep Purple" was published in 1933 as a piano composition. The following year, Paul Whiteman had it scored for his suave "big band" orchestra that was "making a lady out of jazz" in Whiteman's phrase. "Deep Purple" became so popular in sheet music sales that Mitchell Parish added lyrics in 1938.

== 1938–39 recordings ==
- Larry Clinton and His Orchestra recorded one of the most popular versions of the song on 23 December 1938. Featuring vocalist Bea Wain, the Clinton version was a huge hit. Released in January 1939 on Victor Records, the Clinton recording was number one on the U.S. popular music charts for nine consecutive weeks in 1939.
- The next most popular version was made by Jimmy Dorsey which reached the No. 2 spot
- Guy Lombardo (No. 9)
- Bing Crosby (recorded March 22, 1939 with Matty Malneck and His Orchestra) (No. 14)
- Artie Shaw (No. 17) (with vocalist Helen Forrest) also charted in 1939. The song is a sentimental ballad.
- Adelaide Hall introduced the song to Britain and recorded it for Decca. Her version was released on 15 May 1939.

== Nino Tempo & April Stevens ==
"Deep Purple"
- The cover of the album of the same name

Single by Nino Tempo & April Stevens

from the album Deep Purple
- B-side: "I've Been Carrying a Torch for You So Long That It Burned a Great Big Hole in My Heart"
- Released: September 1963
- Genre: Pop; rockabilly
- Length: 2:40
- Label: Atco
- Songwriters: Peter DeRose, Mitchell Parish

Nino Tempo & April Stevens singles chronology
"Baby Weemus" (1963)	"Deep Purple" (1963)	"Whispering" (1963)

The second-most popular version, which hit number one on the U.S. pop charts (the 100th song to do so) in November 1963 and also won that year's Grammy Award for Best Rock and Roll Record, was recorded by brother-sister act Nino Tempo & April Stevens. It remained in the Top 40 for twelve weeks and was number one on the Hot 100 in November 1963. This version of the song is notable for its second half, in which April Stevens speaks the lyrics in a low and sweet voice while Nino Tempo sings. According to the Billboard Book of Number One Hits by Fred Bronson, when the duo first recorded the song as a demo, Tempo forgot the words, and Stevens spoke the lyrics to the song to remind him. The record's producers thought Stevens' spoken interludes were "cute" and should be included on the finished product, but according to Stevens, Tempo "didn't want anyone talking while he was singing!"

=== Charts ===
==== Weekly charts ====
Chart (1963)	Peak position
Canada (CHUM Hit Parade)	3
US Billboard Hot 100	1
US Billboard R&B	4

==== Year-end charts ====
Chart (1963)	Rank
US Billboard Hot 100	19

The Tempo/Stevens version was intended as the B-side of a song called "I've Been Carrying a Torch for You So Long That It Burned a Great Big Hole in My Heart". However, radio stations preferred "Deep Purple". "I've Been Carrying a Torch..." held the distinction of having the longest title, at 67 letters, of a flipside of a Billboard number-one record. The B-side of Prince's 1984 number-one hit "When Doves Cry", titled "17 Days (the rain will come down, then U will have 2 choose, if U believe, look 2 the dawn and U shall never lose)", is now the longest such flipside title, with 85 letters and numbers.

== Donny & Marie Osmond version ==
"Deep Purple"

Single by Donny & Marie Osmond
- B-side: "Take Me Back Again"
- Released: December 1975
- Genre: Pop
- Label: MGM
- Songwriters: Peter DeRose, Mitchell Parish
- Producer: Mike Curb

Donny & Marie Osmond singles chronology
"Make the World Go Away" (1975)	"Deep Purple" (1975)	"Ain't Nothing Like the Real Thing" (1976)

Another brother-and-sister team, Donny and Marie Osmond, revived "Deep Purple" with a note-for-note cover version of Tempo and Stevens's recording in 1975 and took it into the Top 20 on the U.S. and Canadian pop charts. It peaked at number 14 in March 1976 on the Billboard Hot 100, with Marie Osmond speaking the lyrics as Stevens had done in the version with Tempo. The song that succeeded the Tempo/Stevens version of "Deep Purple" at number one on the Billboard chart, "I'm Leaving It Up to You" by Dale & Grace, had also been a hit over a decade later in a cover version by Donny & Marie in 1974.

Donny and Marie Osmond's "Deep Purple" was an even greater Adult Contemporary hit. It peaked at number eight on both the U.S. and Canadian charts. The song spent 23 weeks on the pop chart, far longer than did any other song by the Osmond family. "Deep Purple" is ranked as the 42nd-biggest U.S. hit of 1976.

Donny and Marie performed "Deep Purple" on Bob Hope's Christmas Party on December 14, 1975.

=== Charts ===
==== Weekly charts ====
Chart (1975–1976)	Peak position
Australia KMR	39
Canada RPM Top Singles	15
Canada RPM Adult Contemporary	8
New Zealand (RIANZ)	8
UK	25
US Billboard Hot 100	14
US Billboard Adult Contemporary	8
US Cash Box Top 100	20

==== Year-end charts ====
Chart (1976)	Rank
Australia	187
Canada RPM Top Singles	134
US Billboard Hot 100	42

== Later versions ==
The song remained a favorite interpreted by many genres:

- Harry James recorded a version in 1951 on the album Your Dance Date With Harry James And His Orchestra (Columbia CL 6138).
- Saxophone player Earl Bostic had an instrumental hit with "Deep Purple" 1953, along with his biggest hit "Flamingo" (both on his 1963 LP The Best Of Earl Bostic).
- Joe Loss and His Orchestra recorded it on October 15, 1956. It was released on the 78 rpm record His Master's Voice POP 107.
- Pop and jazz recording artist Joni James also covered "Deep Purple" for her 1956 album In the Still of the Night.
- Avant-garde jazz keyboardist Sun Ra recorded the song in 1953 with Swing violinist Stuff Smith for their Deep Purple album.
- In 1957 as a doo wop classic by The Dominoes with vocals by Eugene Mumford.
- Screamin' Jay Hawkins (best remembered for his song "I Put A Spell On You") also released his version of "Deep Purple" on his 1958 album, At Home with Screamin' Jay.
- The song was released in 1959 by Ralph Marterie on the Wing album Marvelous Marterie.
- Ray Conniff recorded the song in 1959 on the album Say It with Music (A Touch of Latin).
- Singer Carol Sloane recorded two versions: one on her 1962 debut album Out of the Blue, accompanied by an octet performing Bill Finegan's arrangement, and another on her 2001 album I Never Went Away, accompanied by pianist Norman Simmons.
- Al Hirt released a version on his 1965 album They're Playing Our Song.
- An instrumental version of "Deep Purple" was recorded by The Shadows for their 1965 album The Sound of The Shadows.
- In 1975, Ray Stevens recorded a version for his album Misty and was the B-side to his single "Young Love".
- In 1977, the Beach Boys recorded a version for their (still unreleased) album Adult/Child. This recording, along with the rest of the album, circulated amongst collectors until it was eventually released on February 13th, 2026 on We Gotta Groove
- Eileen Brennan and Peter Falk sing it in duet in the film The Cheap Detective (1978).
- A recording by Vic Damone featured in the film Donnie Brasco (1997).
- Ingrid Lucia sang the song on the album titled Almost Blue (2004).

== Popular culture ==
- The tune was a favorite of Babe Ruth, and Peter DeRose performed the song at Ruth's birthday parties for about a decade.

=== The rock band Deep Purple ===
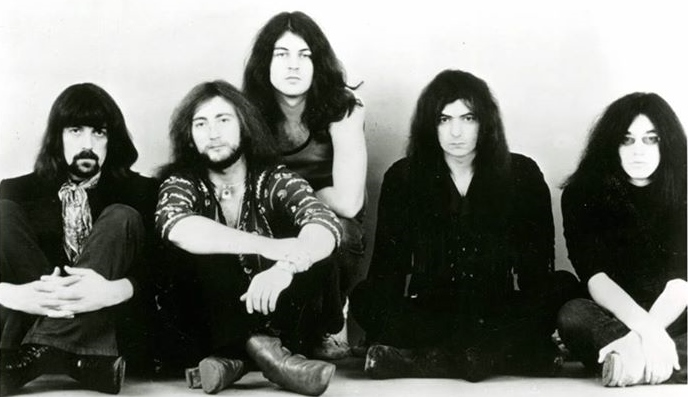
The British rock band Deep Purple (classic "Mark II" lineup pictured) is named after the song.

The British rock band Deep Purple took their name from Pete DeRose's hit, as it was the favourite song of original guitarist Ritchie Blackmore's grandmother; she would also play the song on piano. However, the band has never recorded or performed the song.
