= Dick Robertson (songwriter) =

American singer and songwriter (1900-1979)

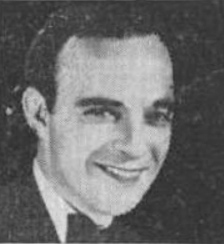
- Robertson in a 1945 advertisement

Background information
- Born: Richard Joseph Richardson; July 3, 1900; Brooklyn, New York, U.S.
- Died: ??July 12, 1979 (aged 79) ??Long Island, New York, U.S.
- Genres: Big band
- Occupation: Songwriter
- Instrument: Vocalist
- Label: Banner Records

Richard Joseph Robertson (July 3, 1900 – July 12, 1979) was an American popular big band singer and songwriter of the 1930s and 1940s. He sang for many bandleaders such as Duke Ellington, Benny Goodman, Leo Reisman, Andy Kirk, and Roger Wolfe Kahn and His Orchestra, and was on the artist roster at Banner Records.

== Early life ==
Robertson was raised in Brooklyn where his father owned a construction business. After high school, he worked for his father as a construction foremen but during the winter season, when business was slow and his parents were vacationing in warmer climes, he moonlighted first as a taxi driver and then later as a singer in a local band. The latter employment led to him accepting work as a vocalist for a New York music publishing company and eventually work in various radio station which at that time, often featured live performances.

== Career ==
While not a star in his own right, Robertson was one of the most prolific New York based vocalists (along with Irving Kaufman, Chick Bullock, Scrappy Lambert, Elmer Feldkamp, Paul Small and Smith Ballew) on scores of records from late 1928 through the mid 1930s. A series of records issued on Melotone/Perfect/Banner/Oriole/Romeo, Crown, Bluebird from 1930-1934 were issued under his name or as being under his nominal leadership. He also used the pseudonym "Bob Richardson" for some recordings on Mayfair Records and “Bob Dickson”, and “Bobby Dix” for some of his studio work.

Robertson frequently performed in front of live audiences, either as part of a larger vaudeville act, or as a vocalist with supporting musicians. While often credited as "Dick Robertson and His Orchestra" on record labels, Robertson never led an orchestra in public.

As a songwriter his biggest hit was "We Three (My Echo, My Shadow and Me)" in 1940. Frank Sinatra covered the song on The Song Is You (album) and again on Frank Sinatra & the Tommy Dorsey Orchestra. Ella Fitzgerald covered the song as well, released on Jukebox Ella: The Complete Verve Singles, Vol. 1.

Robertson's last recording session was in 1949 on the Coral Records label, a subsidiary of Decca Records, with country music producer Owen Bradley.

As late as 1954, Robertson was advertised as a nightclub singer in Syracuse, New York.

== As songwriter ==
- "A Little on the Lonely Side", co-written in 1945 with Frank Weldon and James Cavanaugh. As performed by Frankie Carle and his orchestra, the song reached #4 on Billboard.
- "I'd Do It All Over Again", 1945, co-written with Frank Weldon and James Cavanaugh.
- "Under the Mistletoe", 1941, co-written with Sammy Mysels and James Cavanaugh.
- "We Three (My Echo, My Shadow and Me)" in 1940

== As singer ==
- "Singin' in the Bathtub", 1929
- "Lazy Day", 1932
- "Lovable", 1932
- "If I Ever Get a Job Again", 1933 with Gene Kardos and His Orchestra
- "All I Do Is Dream of You", 1934
- "Blue Moon", 1934
- "The Merry-Go-Round Broke Down", 1937 with Jimmie Lunceford and his orchestra
- "She Had to Go and Lose It at the Astor", 1940 - banned by the BBC
- "Any Bonds Today?", 1940
- "Ferryboat Serenade", 1941 - Number 1 in Australia
- "My Dreams Are Getting Better All the Time", 1945
