= Dr. Buzzard's Original Savannah Band =

American disco band

- Origin: New York City, U.S.
- Genres: Disco, big band, soul
- Years active: 1976–1979, 1984
- Label: RCA
- Past members: Cory Daye; Stony Browder; Mickey Sevilla; Andy Hernandez; August Darnell

Dr. Buzzard's Original Savannah Band was a big band- and swing-influenced disco band that was formed in the Bronx, New York. The band is best known for its number-one US dance hit "Cherchez La Femme/C'est si bon", from its self-titled debut album. It also peaked at #27 on the Billboard Hot 100.

== History ==
The band was conceived by brothers Stony Browder Jr. (February 7, 1949 – October 6, 2001) and Thomas Browder (also known as August Darnell, born August 12, 1950), with the former writing music and the latter lyrics. They started the band in 1974 with singer Cory Daye (born April 25, 1952), drummer Mickey Sevilla, and percussionist Andy Hernandez (Coati Mundi). They released three albums between 1976 and 1979. Their music blended disco beats with rhythms from genres including calypso, rhumba, cha-cha-chá, and compas. The Browders, who were both multiracial, wrote songs embracing multiculturalism over stories about tragic mulattoes. A smaller lineup known as Dr. Buzzard's Savannah Band (omitting the word "original") also released a fourth album in 1984. They were frequent performers at Studio 54. Darnell and Hernandez went on to form Kid Creole and the Coconuts and Elbow Bones and the Racketeers.

Cory Daye also pursued a successful solo career. In 1979, she released the album Cory and Me. The album produced a single, "Pow Wow" b/w Green Light", which peaked on the U.S. Billboard Hot 100 at #76 and on the disco chart at #8 later that year.The track "Wiggle and Giggle All Night" became a Top 20 hit in the Netherlands.

Stony Browder Jr. died in 2001.

== Copyright lawsuit ==
In 2022, songwriters L. Russell Brown and Sandy Linzer filed a copyright lawsuit against Dua Lipa claiming that her song "Levitating" infringed on their 1979 song "Wiggle and Giggle All Night".

== Members ==
- Stony Browder Jr. – music, guitar, piano, vocals (1976–1979, 1984)
- August Darnell – lyrics, bass, vocals (1976–1979)
- Cory Daye – vocals (1976–1979, 1984)
- Mickey Sevilla – drums (1976–1979, 1984)
- Andy Hernandez – percussion (1976–1979)

== Discography ==
=== Studio albums ===
Year	Title	Peak chart positions					Certifications	Record label
Year	Title	US	US R&B	AUS	CAN	NLD	Certifications	Record label
1976	Dr. Buzzard's Original Savannah Band	22	31	39	87	13	RIAA: Gold	RCA
1978	Dr. Buzzard's Original Savannah Band Meets King Penett	36	23	—	29	—		RCA
1979	Dr. Buzzard's Original Savannah Band Goes to Washington	—	—	—	—	—		Elektra
1984	Calling All Beatniks!	—	—	—	—	—		Passport
"—" denotes a recording that did not chart or was not released in that territory.

=== Compilation albums ===
- The Very Best of Dr. Buzzard's Original Savannah Band (1996, RCA)
- The Disco Kids (2005, Sony BMG)

=== Singles ===
Year	Title	Peak chart positions					
Year	Title	US	US R&B	US Dan	AUS	CAN	NLD
1976	"I'll Play the Fool"	80	92	1	—	100	19
1976	"Cherchez La Femme"	27	31	1	49	23	2
1976	"Sour and Sweet"	—	72	1	—	—	—
1978	"Mister Love"	—	—	22	—	—	—
1978	"Organ Grinder"	—	—	22	—	—	—
1978	"Auf Wiedersehen, Darrio"	—	—	22	—	—	—
1978	"Transistor Madness"	—	—	22	—	—	—
1979	"Didn't I Love You Girl"	—	—	—	—	—	
"—" denotes a recording that did not chart or was not released in that territory.

== See also ==
- List of number-one dance hits (United States)
- List of artists who reached number one on the US Dance chart
- Kid Creole and the Coconuts

== Notes ==
- Shapiro, Peter (2005). The Secret History of Disco: Turn the Beat Around. New York: Faber and Faber. ISBN 978-0-571-21923-0.
