= Dr. Buzzard's Original Savannah Band Meets King Penett =

Studio album by Dr. Buzzard's Original Savannah Band
- Released: 1978
- Recorded: April 1977
- Genre: Disco, big band
- Length: 32:53
- Label: RCA
- Producer: Stony Browder Jr.

Dr. Buzzard's Original Savannah Band chronology
Dr. Buzzard's Original Savannah Band (1976)	Dr. Buzzard's Original Savannah Band Meets King Penett (1978)	Dr. Buzzard's Original Savannah Band Goes to Washington (1979)

Dr. Buzzard's Original Savannah Band Meets King Penett is the second studio album by Dr. Buzzard's Original Savannah Band. It was released in 1978 by RCA Records. It peaked at number 36 on the Billboard 200 chart and number 23 on the Top R&B Albums chart.

== Critical reception ==
Professional ratings
Review scores
Source	Rating
AllMusic	2/5 stars
Christgau's Record Guide	B
The Rolling Stone Album Guide	2.5/5 stars

The New York Times called the album "a sometimes obscure but still evocative historical collage, full of verbal and musical references to America, France and Germany in the 1940's." The Boston Globe noted the "Latin rhythms and black boogie woogie do wah's." Newsday determined that "their musical combination has parts of Duke Ellington, the Pointer Sisters and Lambert, Hendricks and Ross updated for today's well-dressed disco-goer."

== Track listing ==
All tracks are written by August Darnell and Stony Browder Jr.

Side one
No.	Title	Length
1.	"Mister Love"	4:28
2.	"Nocturnal Interludes"	3:26
3.	"The Gigolo and I"	4:31
4.	"I'll Always Have a Smile for You"	2:47

Side two
No.	Title	Length
1.	"Transistor Madness/Future D.J."	4:27
2.	"An Organ Grinder's Tale"	4:28
3.	"Soraya/March of the Nignies"	4:40
4.	"Auf Wiedersehen, Darrio"	4:06

== Personnel ==
- Cory Daye – vocals
- Stony Browder – guitar, keyboards, vocals
- Paulinho da Costa – percussion
- August Darnell – bass, vocals
- Andy "Coati Mundi" Hernandez – percussion
- Susandra Minsky – vocals
- Mickey Sevilla – drums

== Charts ==
Chart performance for Dr. Buzzard's Original Savannah Band Meets King Penett
Chart	Peak position
US Billboard 200	36
US Top R&B Albums (Billboard)	23
