= Grammy Award for Best Contemporary Song =

Music award, 1959 to 1971

The Grammy Award for Best Contemporary Song was awarded between 1959 and 1971. The award had several minor name changes:

- In 1959 the award was known as Best Performance by a "Top 40" Artist
- In 1961 it was awarded as Best Performance by a Pop Single Artist
- From 1962 to 1965 it was awarded as Best Rock & Roll Recording
- In 1966 it was awarded as Contemporary (R&R) Single
- In 1967 it was awarded as Best Contemporary (R&R) Recording
- In 1968 it was awarded as Best Contemporary Single
- From 1970 to 1971 it was awarded as Best Contemporary Song

Years reflect the year in which the Grammy Awards were presented, for works released in the previous year.

Awards from 1959 to 1968
| Year | Musician | Contemporary Song | Ref |
|---|---|---|---|
| 1959 | Nat King Cole | "Midnight Flyer" | |
| 1959 | Elvis Presley | "A Big Hunk o' Love" | |
| 1959 | The Coasters | "Charlie Brown" | |
| 1959 | Floyd Robinson | "Makin' Love" | |
| 1959 | Neil Sedaka | "The Diary" | |
| 1961 | Ray Charles | "Georgia on My Mind" | |
| 1961 | Ella Fitzgerald | "Mack the Knife" | |
| 1961 | Elvis Presley | "Are You Lonesome Tonight?" | |
| 1961 | Frank Sinatra | "Nice 'N' Easy" | |
| 1961 | Peggy Lee | "Heart" | |
| 1962 | Chubby Checker | "Let's Twist Again" | |
| 1962 | Chris Kenner | "I Like It Like That" | |
| 1962 | Ike & Tina Turner | "It's Gonna Work Out Fine" | |
| 1962 | James Darren | "Goodbye Cruel World" | |
| 1962 | The Tokens | "The Lion Sleeps Tonight" | |
| 1963 | Bent Fabric | "Alley Cat" | |
| 1963 | Mary Wells | "You Beat Me to the Punch" | |
| 1963 | Neil Sedaka | "Breaking Up Is Hard to Do" | |
| 1963 | Sam Cooke | "Twistin' the Night Away" | |
| 1963 | The Drifters | "Up on the Roof" | |
| 1963 | The Four Seasons | "Big Girls Don't Cry" | |
| 1964 | April Stevens & Nino Tempo | "Deep Purple" | |
| 1964 | Chet Atkins | "Teen Scene" | |
| 1964 | Lesley Gore | "It's My Party" | |
| 1964 | Peggy March | "I Will Follow Him" | |
| 1964 | Ruby & the Romantics | "Our Day Will Come" | |
| 1965 | Petula Clark | "Downtown" | |
| 1965 | Bobby Vinton | "Mr. Lonely" | |
| 1965 | Roy Orbison | "Oh, Pretty Woman" | |
| 1965 | The Beatles | "A Hard Day's Night" | |
| 1965 | The Righteous Brothers | "You've Lost That Lovin' Feelin'" | |
| 1966 | Roger Miller | "King of the Road" | |
| 1966 | Glenn Yarbrough | "Baby the Rain Must Fall" | |
| 1966 | Jackie DeShannon | "What the World Needs Now Is Love" | |
| 1966 | The Beatles | "Yesterday" | |
| 1966 | Tom Jones | "It's Not Unusual" | |
| 1967 | New Vaudeville Band | "Winchester Cathedral" | |
| 1967 | The Association | "Cherish" | |
| 1967 | The Beach Boys | "Good Vibrations" | |
| 1967 | The Beatles | "Eleanor Rigby" | |
| 1967 | The Mamas & the Papas | "Monday, Monday" | |
| 1967 | The Monkees | "Last Train to Clarksville" | |
| 1968 | The 5th Dimension, Johnny Rivers and Marc Gordon (producers) | "Up, Up and Away" | |
| 1968 | Bobbie Gentry and Kelly Gordon (producers) | "Ode to Billie Joe" | |
| 1968 | Glen Campbell and Al De Lory (producers) | "By the Time I Get to Phoenix" | |
| 1968 | Petula Clark and Tony Hatch (producers) | "Don't Sleep in the Subway" | |
| 1968 | Ray Charles and Joe Adams (producers) | "Yesterday" | |

Awards in 1970 and 1971
| Year | Songwriter | Performer | Contemporary Song | Ref |
|---|---|---|---|---|
| 1970 | Joe South | Joe South | "Games People Play" | |
| 1970 | David Clayton-Thomas | Blood, Sweat & Tears | "Spinning Wheel" | |
| 1970 | Hal David and Burt Bacharach | B. J. Thomas | "Raindrops Keep Fallin' on My Head" | |
| 1970 | Mac Davis | Elvis Presley | "In the Ghetto" | |
| 1970 | Rod McKuen | Oliver | "Jean" | |
| 1971 | Paul Simon | Simon & Garfunkel | "Bridge over Troubled Water" | |
| 1971 | James Taylor | James Taylor | "Fire and Rain" | |
| 1971 | John Lennon and Paul McCartney | The Beatles | "Let It Be" | |
| 1971 | Paul Williams and Roger Nichols | The Carpenters | "We've Only Just Begun" | |
| 1971 | Ray Stevens | Ray Stevens | "Everything Is Beautiful" | |
