= Nino Tempo =

American musician, singer and actor (1935–2025)

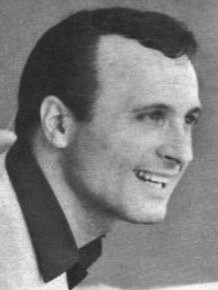
- Tempo in a photo with his sister, April Stevens (not seen in this cropped version) in the KRLA Beat, December 1965
- Born: Antonino LoTempio; January 6, 1935; Niagara Falls, New York, U.S.
- Died: April 10, 2025 (aged 90); West Hollywood, California
- Occupations: Musician; singer; actor
- Family: April Stevens (sister)

Antonino LoTempio (January 6, 1935 – April 10, 2025) was an American musician, singer, and actor. He was a duet partner with his older sister April Stevens as well as the frontman for a 1970s funk band, 5th Ave. Sax.

== Biography ==
=== Early life ===
Antonino LoTempio was born in Niagara Falls, New York. A musical prodigy, he learned to play the clarinet and the tenor saxophone as a child. He won a talent show at four years of age and appeared on television with Benny Goodman at age seven. When his family moved to California, he was featured on the Horace Heidt radio show, performing a Benny Goodman clarinet solo.

=== Film ===
A child actor, he appeared in The Red Pony and in The Glenn Miller Story featuring James Stewart.

=== Music career ===
Tempo was a sought-after session musician, working as a member of the famous session band the Wrecking Crew, performing with Elkie Brooks, and recording with Maynard Ferguson (Live at the Peacock, 1956). Via a Bobby Darin recording session, Tempo made connections with Atlantic Records and signed with its subsidiary Atco Records.

However, Nino Tempo was known best for his 1963 duet "Deep Purple" on Atco with his sister Carol (singing under the stage name April Stevens), which was No.1 on the Billboard Hot 100. The song won the 1964 Grammy Award for Best Rock And Roll Recording, selling more than one million copies and earning a gold disc.

During late 1973, a little less than ten years after "Deep Purple" had topped the Hot 100, Tempo formed Nino Tempo and 5th Ave. Sax, which had the hit "Sister James," reaching #53 on the Hot 100 on October 27. Recorded at A&M Records studio with the backing, writing, producing, and arranging of Jeff Barry, "Sister James" became one of the first instrumental disco records to score the national charts. "Sister James" is often classified as an example of Northern Soul.

During 1975, Tempo played saxophone on John Lennon's album Rock 'n' Roll, and was a featured soloist on The Kenny Rankin Album (1976).

=== Voice work ===
In the 1980s he was a voice actor for multiple Garfield TV specials.

== Death ==
Tempo died at his home in West Hollywood, California, on April 10, 2025 at the age of 90.

== Discography ==
=== Singles ===
Year	Titles (A-side, B-side)	Chart positions			Album
Year	Titles (A-side, B-side)	US	US AC	US R&B	Album
1958	"Loonie 'Bout Junie" b/w "15 Girl Friends"				Non-album tracks
1959	"Ding-A-Ling" b/w "When You Were Sweet Sixteen"				Non-album tracks
1960	"Jack The Ripper" (with Pete Rugolo & His Orchestra); B-side by Pete Rugolo, His Orchestra and Chorus: "Main Theme From 'Jack The Ripper'"				Non-album tracks
1960	"Lipstick On Your Lips" b/w "What Is Love To A Teenager"				Non-album tracks
1967	"Boys Town (Where My Broken Hearted Buddies Go)" b/w Instrumental "Sing Along" version of A-side				Non-album tracks
1973	"Sister James" b/w "Clair De Lune (In Jazz)" (Non-album track); Nino Tempo & 5th Ave. Sax	53	18	78	Come See Me 'Round Midnight
1974	"Roll It" b/w "Hawkeye" (Non-album track); Nino Tempo & 5th Ave. Sax				Come See Me 'Round Midnight
1974	"Come See Me Round Midnight" b/w "High On The Music"; Nino Tempo & 5th Ave. Sax				Come See Me 'Round Midnight
1974	"Don't Stop Now" b/w "Gettin' Off"; Nino Tempo & 5th Ave. Sax				Come See Me 'Round Midnight
1980	"I Know Where You're Goin'"; A-side by Tommy Dee: "Here Is My Love"				Non-album tracks

=== As sideman ===
With Maynard Ferguson

- Dimensions (EmArcy, 1955)

With the Modern Jazz Quartet

- MJQ & Friends: A 40th Anniversary Celebration (Atlantic, 1994)

== See also ==
- Nino Tempo & April Stevens
