= Leo Reisman =

American violinist and bandleader (1897–1961)

Background information
- Born: Leo F. Reisman; October 11, 1897; Boston, Massachusetts, U.S.
- Died: December 18, 1961 (aged 64) New York City, U.S.
- Genre: Swing
- Occupations: Musician; bandleader
- Instrument: Violin
- Years active: 1920s–1930s
- Labels: Columbia; RCA Victor; Brunswick

Leo F. Reisman (October 11, 1897 – December 18, 1961) was an American violinist and bandleader in the 1920s and 1930s. Inspired by the Russian-American violinist Jascha Heifetz, Reisman studied violin as a young man. After being rejected by the Boston Symphony Orchestra, he formed his own band in 1919. He became famous for having over 80 hits on the popular charts during his career. Jerome Kern called Reisman's orchestra "The String Quartet of Dance Bands".

== Biography ==
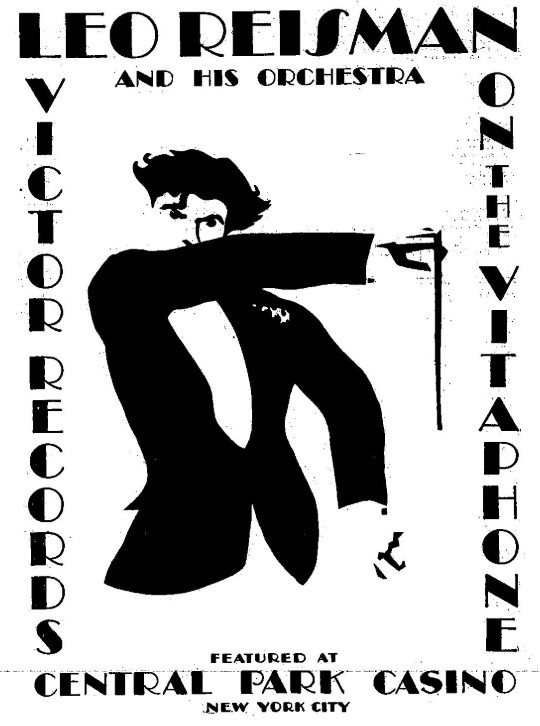
Advertisement from the June 1929 issue of Variety magazine

Leo Reisman was born in Boston, Massachusetts, United States. His first recording was on a 10-inch 78 rpm record for Columbia Records, recorded on January 10, 1921, the two titles being "Love Bird" (Columbia A-3366, mx.79634) and the other title being "Bright Eyes" (Columbia A-3366, mx.79635).

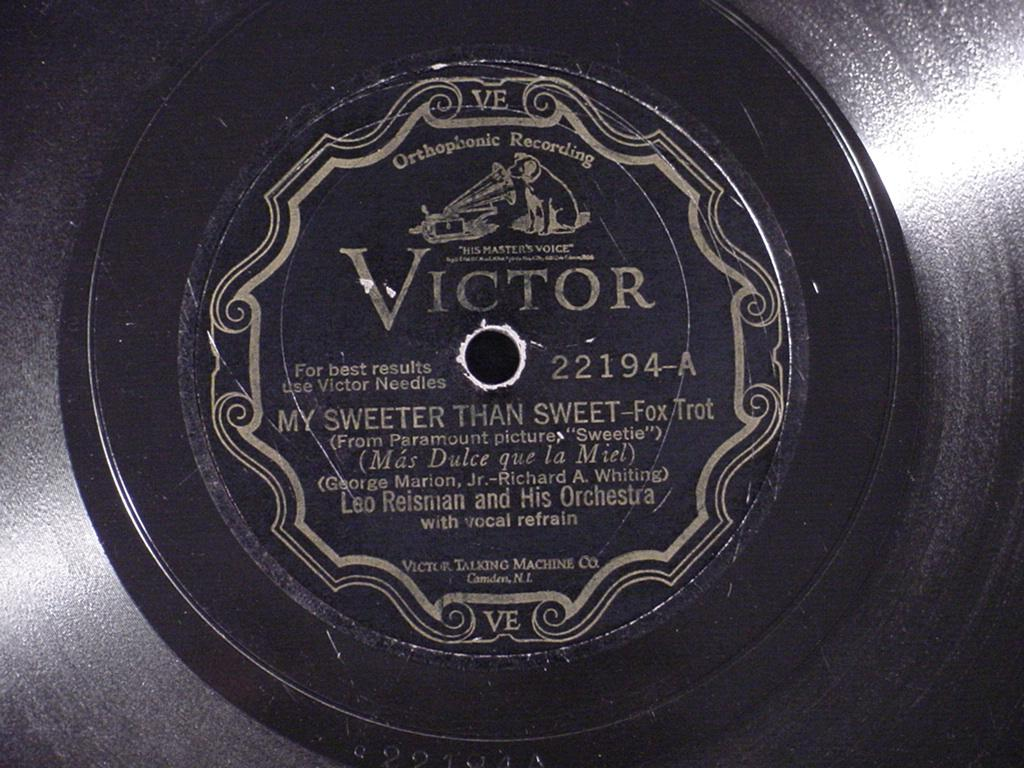
Leo Reisman and His Orchestra, "My Sweeter Than Sweet", by George Marion Jr. and Richard A. Whiting (Victor 22194-A)

Reisman recorded for Columbia exclusively from July 1923 through March 11, 1929, when he signed with Victor, whom he stayed with until October 1933. He then signed with Brunswick and stayed until 1937 when he re-signed with Victor. During his 1929–1933 Victor period, Reisman recorded many lesser-known period Broadway songs, some of which were recorded by no other band. Due to his popularity, he was always one of the prominent bands during his time at Columbia, Victor, and Brunswick, and he recorded prolifically.

Reisman also had the habit of featuring composers and Broadway performers as band vocalists, including Harold Arlen, Fred Astaire, Clifton Webb, and Arthur Schwartz. He also featured Lee Wiley in 1931–32 for her first three recordings. More often than not, his vocalists were Frank Luther, Dick Robertson, and later, Sally Singer and George Beuler. A notable recording from this era was "Happy Days Are Here Again" in November 1929, with vocals by Lou Levin.

Among his more popular hits were his recordings of Cole Porter's "Night and Day" (1932) and Con Conrad's "The Continental" (1934), plus Astaire's recording of Irving Berlin's "Cheek to Cheek" (1935).

Reisman's was primarily a dance orchestra; he was not a fan of jazz music, though some of his early 1930s 78 rpm recordings were considered a bit "hot". (However, Reisman employed the legendary trumpet player Bubber Miley in 1930–31, who had been a featured member of Duke Ellington's orchestra.) Reisman worked with Sam Donahue between 1946 and 1951.

Eddy Duchin was a member of Leo Reisman's orchestra; it was Reisman who gave Duchin his big break. The bandleader and TV personality Mitch Miller was also a member of Reisman's orchestra.

Reisman's work on radio included having the Nine o'Clock Revue, a 30-minute weekly program on the Mutual Broadcasting System in 1937.

Reisman died in New York City on December 18, 1961, at the age of 64.

== Charting singles ==
- 1940: "Down Argentina Way" (U.S. No. 7)
- 1940: "Ferry-Boat Serenade" (U.S. No. 19)
