= Nino Tempo & April Stevens =

American pop duo

- Origin: Niagara Falls, New York, US
- Genres: Pop rock
- Years active: 1961–2005
- Labels: Atco; White Whale; A&M
- Past members: Nino Tempo; April Stevens
- Website: http://www.ninoandapril.com/

Nino Tempo & April Stevens (Antonino and Carol Vincinette LoTempio) were a brother and sister singing act from Niagara Falls, New York. Formed in the early 1960s when Nino Tempo and April Stevens signed as a duo with Atco Records, they had a string of Billboard hits and earned a Grammy Award as "best rock & roll record of the year" for the single "Deep Purple".

== "Deep Purple" ==
"Deep Purple" (1963) is notable for April Stevens speaking the lyrics in a low, sweet voice during the second half of the song while her brother sings. When the duo first recorded the song as a demo, Tempo forgot the words, and Stevens spoke the lyrics to remind him. The producers thought the spoken interlude was "cute" and wanted to include it but, according to Stevens, her brother was not as easily convinced: "He didn't want anyone talking while he was singing!" However, Nino must have come around, since the duo would employ this tactic again on "Whispering."

Producer Ahmet Ertegün had originally intended "Deep Purple" to be the B-side of a song called "I've Been Carrying A Torch For You So Long That It Burned A Great Big Hole In My Heart". He did not share Tempo's belief that it would be a hit, calling it "the most embarrassing thing" the duo had ever recorded. When radio stations preferred "Deep Purple," Ertegun relented, and so "I've Been Carrying A Torch ..." was the longest title of a flipside of a Billboard number one record, until Prince's "When Doves Cry" in 1984 had "17 Days ..." on its flipside.

Despite being considered "rock and roll," "Deep Purple" also reached number one on Billboard's Adult Contemporary singles chart. The record had been preceded in 1962 by a single in a similar style, "Sweet and Lovely," and was followed by a series of singles of more oldies similarly arranged, including "Whispering", "Stardust", and "Tea for Two".

== Later career ==
Music journalist Richie Unterberger has described the later disc All Strung Out as Nino Tempo & April Stevens' "greatest triumph", declaring it "one of the greatest Phil Spector-inspired productions of all time". For years following their charting singles, the duo continued recording, but failed to achieve continued sales success.

However, in February 1973 the duo scored a number 5 hit in the Netherlands with "Love Story" on A&M Records, two years after Andy Williams took that same song to number 13 in what was then the Veronica Top 40.

== Select discography ==
=== Albums ===
- Nino Tempo's Rock 'N Roll Beach Party (1956) Liberty Records LRP3023
- A Nino Tempo - April Stevens Program Nino Tempo (Side One) & April Stevens (Side Two) RCA Camden CAS 824
- Deep Purple (1963) Atco 33-156 (Mono) and Atco SD 33-156 (Stereo)
- Nino And April Sing the Great Songs (1964) Atco 33-162 (Mono) and Atco SD 33-162 (Stereo)
- Hey Baby! (1966) Atco 33-180 (Mono) and Atco SD 33-180 (Stereo)
- All Strung Out (1966) White Whale WW-113 (Mono) and White Whale WW-7113 (Stereo)
- Come See Me 'Round Midnight (Nino Tempo & 5th Avenue Sax) A&M SP3629
- Love Story and Their Hits of Yesterday, Today And Tomorrow Nino Tempo & April Stevens (Shown as Nino & April, New A&M Singles, plus five early hits. Re-recorded and released only in Europe) A&M 87 980 IT
- Sweet And Lovely - The Best Of (the best of compilation plus two new songs: "I'm Fallin' For You" (previously unreleased recording from 1985) and "Why Don't You Do Right?" (new 1996 recording)) (1996) Varese Sarabande Records VSD-5592

=== Singles ===
Year	Titles (A-side, B-side)	Chart positions					Album
Year	Titles (A-side, B-side)	US	US AC	US R&B	UK	CAN (CHUM) (RPM)	Album
1960	"High School Sweetheart" b/w "Ooeah! (That's What You Do to Me)"						Non-album tracks
1961	"A Letter on a Train" b/w "Big John"; Shown as by Carol and Anthony						Non-album tracks
1962	"Sweet and Lovely" b/w "True Love (Means More Than Anything)"	77					Deep Purple
1963	"Paradise" b/w "Indian Love Call"	126					Deep Purple
1963	"Baby Weemus" b/w "(We'll Always Be) Together"						Deep Purple
1963	"Deep Purple" b/w "I've Been Carrying a Torch for You So Long That; I Burned a Great Big Hole in My Heart"	1	1	4	17	3	Deep Purple
1963	"Whispering" b/w "Tweedlee Dee" (Non-album track)	11	4		20	17	Nino and April Sing the Great Songs
1964	"Stardust" b/w "I-45" (Non-album track)	32	10			27	Nino and April Sing the Great Songs
1964	"Tea for Two" /	56					Nino and April Sing the Great Songs
1964	"I'm Confessin' (That I Love You)"	99					Nino and April Sing the Great Songs
1964	"Who" b/w "I Surrender Dear"						Nino and April Sing the Great Songs
1964	"Ooh La La" b/w "Melancholy Baby" (Non-album track)	113					Hey Baby!
1964	"Our Love" b/w "Honeysuckle Rose" (from Nino and April Sing the Great Songs)						Non-album track
1965	"These Arms of Mine" b/w "The Coldest Night of the Year"						Hey Baby!
1965	"Swing Me" b/w "Tomorrow Is Soon a Memory"	127					Hey Baby!
1965	"Think of You" b/w "I'm Sweet on You" (Non-album track)						Hey Baby!
1965	"I Love How You Love Me" b/w "Tears of Sorrow" (Non-album track)						Hey Baby!
1965	"Poison of Your Kiss" b/w "Hey Baby"						Hey Baby!
1966	"Bye Bye Blues"; B-side by Nino Tempo Orchestra: "King Kong"						All Strung Out
1966	"All Strung Out" b/w "I Can't Go on Living Baby Without You"	26				8	All Strung Out
1966	"You'll Be Needing Me Baby" b/w "The Habit of Lovin' You Baby"	133					All Strung Out
1967	"My Old Flame" b/w "Wings of Love" (from All Strung Out)	101					Non-album track
1967	"I Can't Go on Livin' Without You, Baby" b/w "Little Child"	86					All Strung Out
1968	"Let It Be Me" b/w "Wings of Love" (from All Strung Out)	127					Non-album tracks
1968	"Ooh Poo Pa Doo" b/w "The Habit of Lovin' You" (from All Strung Out)						Non-album tracks
1969	"Yesterday I Heard the Rain" b/w "Did I or Didn't I"						Non-album tracks
1969	"Sea Of Love--The Dock of the Bay" b/w "Twilight Time"						Non-album tracks
1971	"How About Me (It's Over)" b/w "Makin' Love To Rainbow Colors"					9	
1972	"Love Story" b/w "Hoochy Coochy-Wing Dang Doo" (Non-album track)	113					Love Story
1972	"Darling You Were All That I Had" b/w "You're Losing Me"						Non-album tracks
1972	"She's My Baby" b/w "Tomorrow Is Soon a Memory" (from Hey Baby!)						Non-album tracks
1973	"Put It Where You Want It" b/w "I Can't Get Over You Baby"	122					Love Story
1975	"You Turn Me On" b/w "Never Had a Lover"		38			38	Non-album tracks
1976	"What Kind of Fool Am I" b/w "You and Only You"						Non-album tracks
1980	"I Wonder Who's Kissing Her Now" b/w "I Never Loved Anyone Like I Love You"						Non-album tracks
