= Frank Weldon =

Frank Weldon (Lawrence, Massachusetts, c. 1900-1970) was an American songwriter. He wrote, or co-wrote, many popular songs of the 1930s and 1940s.

== Songs ==
- 1939 "The Man with the Mandolin" James Cavanaugh, Frank Weldon & John Redmond; recorded by The Glenn Miller Orchestra, Wayne King and His Orchestra
- 1944 "Good Night, Wherever You Are" Dick Robertson, Al Hoffman & Frank Weldon; recorded by Vera Lynn, Rosemary Clooney, Kate Smith and Doris Day
- 1945 "I'd Do It All Over Again"
- 1945 "A Little on the Lonely Side" Dick Robertson, Frank Weldon & James Cavanaugh; recorded by Frankie Carle and His Orchestra, Guy Lombardo and His Royal Canadians and the Phil Moore Four
- 1950 "Christmas in Killarney" John Redmond, James Cavanaugh & Frank Weldon; recorded by Percy Faith and His Orchestra, Dennis Day
- 1955 "What Do You See in Her", music by Frank Weldon; words by Hal David; Recorded by Dakota Staton and Nancy Wilson.
- 1956 "Second Fiddle" John Redmond, Frank Weldon, James Cavanaugh & Irving Taylor; recorded by Kay Starr
