= Christmas in Killarney =

Song performed by Bing Crosby

"Christmas in Killarney" is an Irish-American Christmas song written by John Redmond, James Cavanaugh and Frank Weldon, copyright 1950. It had that copyright renewed in 1977. (Note: Under R676371)

This song has been performed by many artists. Two recordings made the Billboard retail chart in 1950: Dennis Day's version peaked at #10, while Percy Faith's reached #28. Most notably Bing Crosby, recorded it on 1 October 1951, and later included it on the 12-inch LP Merry Christmas. Other recording artists include Ruby Murray (1962), Bobby Vinton (1964), Joan Morrissey (1974), Anne Murray (1988), the Irish Rovers (2002), Neil Diamond on his Acoustic Christmas album (2016), and Rend Collective (2020), and The Outside Track (2022). It has also been performed by the Barra MacNeils, Marc Gunn and The Four Ramblers.

The song featured prominently in the Rankin/Bass 1981 Christmas TV special, The Leprechauns' Christmas Gold.
