= Whispering (song) =

1920 song by Paul Whiteman

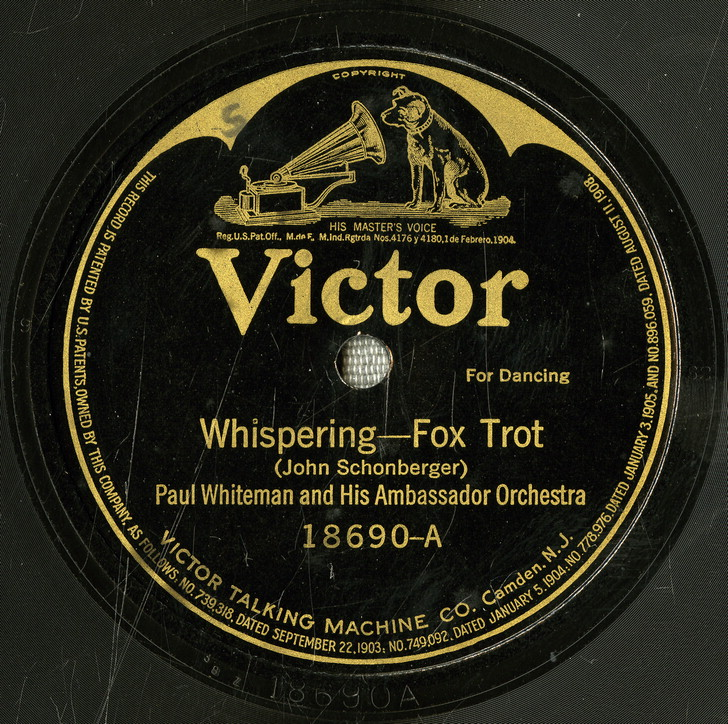

Single by Paul Whiteman and His Ambassador Orchestra
- B-side: "The Japanese Sandman"
- Published: 1920 Sherman, Clay & Co.
- Released: September 1920
- Recorded: August 23, 1920 take 9
- Studio: Victor Studios, Camden, New Jersey
- Genre: Jazz
- Label: Victor 18690
- Composer: John Schonberger
- Lyricists: Richard Coburn, Vincent Rose
- Producer: arranger Ferde Grofe

Paul Whiteman and His Ambassador Orchestra singles chronology
"Whispering" (1920)	"Wang Wang Blues" (1920)

Audio sample
- file; help

"Whispering" is a popular song published in 1920 by Sherman, Clay & Co. of San Francisco. The 1920 copyright attributes the lyrics to Malvin Schonberger and the music to John Schonberger. Sheet music credits Richard Coburn and Vincent Rose as the lyricists.

The song was first released by Paul Whiteman in September 1920 on Victor Records.

== Initial and enduring popularity ==
"Whispering" was recorded by Paul Whiteman and his Ambassador Orchestra on August 23, 1920, for the Victor Talking Machine Company at their studios in Camden, New Jersey. Ferde Grofé arranged the composition and played piano on the recording. Whiteman's version was an eleven-week No. 1 hit in the United States, which stayed 20 weeks in the charts, and sold in excess of two million copies. In 2020, Whiteman's rendition was selected by the Library of Congress for preservation in the National Recording Registry for being "culturally, historically, or aesthetically significant".

The song charted twice in the 1960s. In 1963, Irish singers the Bachelors had a hit with their version which went to the Top 20 in the UK. In 1964, after recording their hit "Deep Purple", American brother-and-sister vocal duo Nino Tempo & April Stevens had a new hit with "Whispering". This version went to number eleven on the Hot 100, number four on the Easy Listening chart, and number 17 in Canada.

According to Allmusic, there have been over 700 versions of the song. As of 2010, on the online music site www.lala.com, there were 161 listed albums or singles containing the song "Whispering". As of 2014, TJD Online, the online version of The Jazz Discography, listed 225 recording sessions, beginning with Ray Miller and his Black and White Melody Boys, who recorded it on about July 16, 1920, Okeh 4167-A. Also, as of 2014, TJD Online listed 281 recording sessions of Dizzy Gillespie's composition, "Groovin' High", a contrafact variation of "Whispering".

== Compositional structure ==
"Whispering", originally scored in E ♭ major, is in 4/4 time. It has a 12-bar intro, the last 4 of which is an optional vamp — then a 16-bar A-theme is followed by a 32-bar repeated chorus. The 32 bars is essentially a 16-bar B-theme played twice — or 4 times with the repeat.

Dizzy Gillespie's 1945 composition, "Groovin' High", is a contrafact of "Whispering". Following a standard practice in jazz, Gillespie front-ran the static V^{7} chords with ii^{7} chords (a "static chord" is a chord that doesn't change), setting up a series of ii^{7}–V^{7} progressions, which creates more structure for improvising. The ii^{7} chord has similar properties to a iv chord (as in the iv–V progression of church harmony). Because "Groovin' High" was a contrafact, performers, publishers, and record companies did not have to pay royalties to the original composers.

== Selected discography ==
Illustration by Wesley Raymond De Lappe (1887–1952).

- George Gershwin (piano roll), Mel-O-Dee 4007

Recorded September 1919
Gershwin arranged this as a set of variations for piano

- Paul Whiteman and His Ambassador Orchestra, Victor 18690-A (1920); OCLC 53866810, 5225741 [Vocalist: John Steel]

Recorded August 23, 1920, in Camden, New Jersey (audio)

- Comedian Harmonists (1934)

Recorded in 1934 in Berlin
"Whispering", arranged by Bernhard Christensen
Male vocal quintet with piano
Ari Leschnikoff (de) (1897–1978) (tenor), Erich A. Collin (de) (1899–1961) (tenor), Harry Frommermann (de) (1906–1975) (tenor), Roman Cycowski (de) (1901–1998) (baritone), Robert Biberti (de) (1902–1985) (bass), Erwin Bootz (de) (1907–1982) (piano)
Re-release: ASV Records CDAJA 5204, Living Era (imprint); OCLC 476559281 (audio)

- The Dorsey Brothers, Associated Broadcasting Company transcription disc (released to radio only)

Recorded February 1, 1935, in New York City
"Whispering" (part of a medley)

- Benny Goodman Quartet, Victor 25481 (1936); OCLC 27247433

Benny Goodman (clarinet), Lionel Hampton (vibes), Teddy Wilson (piano), Gene Krupa (drums)
Recorded December 2, 1936, in New York City
03515-1 (matrix) – "Whispering"
Goodman went on to record it 8 more times, twice in 1938, 1953, 1958, twice in 1959, 1967, and 1980

- Tommy Dorsey And His Sentimentalists with Frank Sinatra and The Pied Pipers, Bluebird B-10771 (1940); OCLC 52815399

Recorded June 13, 1940, in New York City
Bunny Berigan, Jimmy Blake (trumpets); Tommy Dorsey (trombone, leader); Johnny Mince (clarinet); Fred Stulce, Hymie Schertzer (alto saxes); Don Lodice, Paul Mason (tenor saxes); Joe Bushkin (piano); Sid Weiss (bass); Buddy Rich (drums); Frank Sinatra, Pied Pipers (vocals); Sy Oliver (arranger)
051279-1 (matrix) "Whispering"
Tommy Dorsey recorded it 8 other times, once in 1933 while playing with Red McKenzie's band, 5 times in 1940, and twice in 1944

- Boris Vian (French author and jazz-trompettist) records his version "Ah, si j'avais un franc cinquante" ("Oh, if I only had 1,5 dollar") with lyrics, this recording is published as a single (which only sells 500 copies) but in the following years becomes a classic.
- Harry Belafonte with Pete Rugolo And His Orchestra Capitol 856; OCLC 82131926

Recorded from March 24 to April 3, 1949, Hollywood, California
4322-4D-1 (matrix) – "Whispering"
Belafonte recorded this song during the first year of his recording career

- The Miles Davis Sextet, Prestige 742 (1951); OCLC 31875098 (original release)

Miles Davis (trumpet), Bennie Green (trombone), Sonny Rollins (tenor sax), John Lewis (piano), Percy Heath (bass), Roy Haynes (drums)
Recorded January 17, 1951, in New York City
131-A (matrix) – "Whispering"
Miles recorded it again in 1961; he recorded "Groovin' High" 5 times in 1948

- Les Paul and Mary Ford, The Hit Makers!, Capitol, C. 1748 (Netherlands), CL. 13596 (Italy), F1748 (USA), CP-199 (1951); OCLC 477090584

7864 (matrix) – "Whispering"

- Oscar Peterson (1951) (transcription disc, CBC Transcription Service

Recorded March 8, 1951
Oscar Peterson (piano), Austin Roberts (bass)
Many re-issues; OCLC 53481796 (re-issue)

- Bing Crosby for his album Bing with a Beat (1957)
- Pasadena Roof Orchestra, Review, Transatlantic (E)TRA335 (1976)

Recorded in London in 1976
"Whispering" (cover version)
Selections from this album have been released on dozens of other albums

- Benny Carter Meets Oscar Peterson, Pablo 2310-926 (1987); OCLC 18170774

Benny Carter (alto sax), Oscar Peterson (piano), Joe Pass (guitar), Dave Young (bass), Martin Drew (drums)
Recorded November 14, 1986, in Hollywood, California

- Al Jarreau, Accentuate the Positive, Verve B0001634-02 (2004); OCLC 56123014

Recorded at Capitol Recording Studios, Hollywood, California
"Groovin' High" + "Whispering"

== Selected filmography ==
- 1939: Poison Pen
- 1941: Ziegfeld Girl, sung by a male trio
- 1944: Greenwich Village, starring Don Ameche, sung by Vivian Blaine
- 1945: The Clock, sung by a chorus
- 1952: Belles on Their Toes
- 1956: The Eddy Duchin Story, performed by Carmen Cavallaro
- 2016: The Matchbreaker, performed by Christina Grimmie

== Accolades ==
- 1972: Music Hall of Fame inducted "Whispering" as one of the 10 historic songs.
- 1998 Grammy Hall of Fame inductee.

== See also ==
- Frank Sinatra & the Tommy Dorsey Orchestra (album), recorded 1940 (audio)

The Song Is You (album), recorded 1940

- The Complete RCA Victor Small Group Recordings (album), recorded 1935–1939
- Benny Carter Meets Oscar Peterson (album), recorded 1986
- Chet Atkins' Workshop (album), recorded 1960
- Not Necessarily Acoustic (album), recorded 1994
- Pop + Jazz = Swing (album), recorded 1962
- Accentuate the Positive (album), recorded 2004
- "Cherchez La Femme", song variation of "Whispering"
- West Coast Live, Chet Baker & Stan Getz, recorded 1953
- "Groovin' High", jazz standard based on the chord changes of "Whispering" (audio)
- The Bachelors and 16 Great Songs, recorded 1964
