= Mele Kalikimaka =

1949 Hawaiian-themed Christmas song

Single
- Released: 1949
- Genre: Christmas
- Songwriter: Robert Alex Anderson

"Mele Kalikimaka" (pronounced [ˈmɛlɛ kəˌlitiˈmɐkə]) is a Hawaiian-themed Christmas song written in 1949 by R. Alex Anderson. It takes its title from the Hawaiian transliteration of "Merry Christmas", Mele Kalikimaka. One of the earliest recordings of the song was by Bing Crosby and the Andrews Sisters in 1950 on Decca. It has been covered by many artists and used in several films (including L.A. Confidential, Catch Me If You Can, and National Lampoon's Christmas Vacation).

== History of the song ==
R. Alex Anderson recalled the inspiration for writing the song in 1949 while working at Vonn Hamm-Young:

Well, I'll tell ya, a stenographer in our office, this was just before Christmas, and we are all leaving (5 o'clock), and she was next to me and she said, "Mr. Anderson, how come there's no Hawaiian Christmas songs?" She said, "they take all the hymns and they put Hawaiian words to the hymns, but there's no original melody." Well, that spurred me right away – I thought, "what a good idea!" I thought this over, and over a period of a few days this came into my head, put it down on paper, and I've been singing it ever since.

Bing Crosby was a frequent visitor and golf partner of Anderson. Anderson played the song for Crosby, who liked it so much that he surprised Anderson with the 1950 recording. In 1955, the song became part of the reissue of Crosby's famous compilation album Merry Christmas. According to Anderson's daughter Pam, the family still receives revenues from all over the world every year from his songs including "Mele Kalikimaka".

== Origin of the phrase ==
The expression Mele Kalikimaka is a loan phrase from English, but since the Hawaiian language has a different phonological system from English, it is not possible to render a pronunciation that is especially close to Merry Christmas. Standard Hawaiian does not have the /r/ or /s/ sounds of English and its phonotactic constraints do not allow consonants at the end of syllables or consonant clusters. Thus, the closest approximation to Merry Christmas is Mele Kalikimaka. The earliest record of the greeting, Mele Kalikimaka, in print is from 1904, in the Hawaiian language newspaper Ka Nupepa Kuokoa, published between 1861 and 1927.

The phrase is derived from English as follows:

Merry Christmas
↓ Every consonant must be followed by a vowel in Hawaiian. The T is removed, since it is already silent in English.
Mery Carisimasa
↓ The sound C makes is represented by K in Hawaiian.
Mery Karisimasa
↓ R is not a sound in Hawaiian; it is closest to L. Y is replaced by E, the sound it already denotes in English.
Mele Kalisimasa
↓ S is not a sound in Hawaiian; the closest phonetic equivalent is K.
Mele Kalikimaka

== Charts ==
Bing Crosby and the Andrews Sisters version

Chart performance for "Mele Kalikimaka"
Chart (2018–2026)	Peak position
Australia (ARIA)	63
Canada Hot 100 (Billboard)	38
Global 200 (Billboard)	52
Greece International (IFPI)	56
Latvia (DigiTop100)	94
Lithuania (AGATA)	70
Portugal (AFP)	147
Sweden Heatseeker (Sverigetopplistan)	18
Switzerland (Schweizer Hitparade)	63
UK Singles (Official Charts)	71
US Billboard Hot 100	36
US Holiday 100 (Billboard)	25
US Rolling Stone Top 100	32
