= Robert Alexander Anderson (composer) =

American composer (1894–1995

- Born: June 6, 1894; Honolulu, Hawaii
- Died: May 30, 1995 (aged 100) Honolulu, Hawaii, U.S.
- Genre: Hapa haole
- Occupation: Composer

Robert Alexander Anderson (often given as R. Alex Anderson; June 6, 1894 – May 30, 1995) was an American composer who was born and lived most of his life in Hawaii, writing many popular Hawaiian songs within the hapa haole genre including "Lovely Hula Hands" (1940) and "Mele Kalikimaka" (1949), the latter the best known Hawaiian Christmas song.

== Background ==
Anderson was called "Andy" by his close friends.

Anderson was born in Honolulu, Hawaii, and attended Punahou School, where he wrote the school's football song as a junior and the school song as a senior. Anderson graduated from Cornell University in 1916, where he studied electrical and mechanical engineering and was a member of the Cornell University Glee Club. Despite lacking formal training as a composer, Anderson wrote many songs as a student there, including "When Twilight Falls on Blue Cayuga". In 1927, he wrote his first hit song, "Haole Hula". Another well-known song of his was "Punahou" (1966).

Anderson's exploits during World War I involved flying combat missions in France. After being shot down and taken as a prisoner of war by the Germans, he conceived of a daring and ultimately successful escape. This was later turned into the initial treatment for The Dawn Patrol, which retained the title despite the final product bearing little resemblance after incorporating other sources.

Although he had a very active business career, Anderson turned his love of songwriting into a very successful avocation. While Anderson never studied theory or harmony and played a piano mostly by ear, many of his over 100 island songs have become standards. Anderson usually composed away from an instrument, although he sometimes used a piano or ukulele to work out a melody. In 1939, as a result of a chance remark, Anderson was inspired to write his most popular song, "Lovely Hula Hands". After watching a hula dancer at a party, he heard someone say, "Aren't her hands lovely?" After it was performed by Harry Owens and his band on a Honolulu radio station, it became an instant hit. It has been recorded by dozens of artists, including Bing Crosby and Alfred Apaka.

Several of Anderson's songs had movie star associations. "Mele Kalikimaka" was first recorded by his friend Bing Crosby. "Cockeyed Mayor of Kaunakakai" was written in the 1930s for a party honoring the actor Warner Baxter. "White Ginger Blossoms" was written at the suggestion of film star Mary Pickford.

Anderson was considered the "most Hawaiian" of the hapa haole composers, following in the footsteps of songwriters like Charles E. King, using traditional Hawaiian musical qualities and themes.

Anderson died on May 30, 1995, a week before his 101st birthday.
