= Pale Moon (song) =

- Sheet music, 1920

Song
- Written: 1920
- Genre: Popular music
- Composer: Frederic Knight Logan
- Lyricist: Jesse G. M. Glick

Audio sample
- Recording of Pale Moon (An Indian Love Song), performed by Lucy Isabelle Marsh (1921): file; help

"Pale Moon" (An Indian Love Song) is a popular song composed by Frederic Knight Logan with lyrics by Jesse G. M. Glick. The song was written in 1920.

== Notable recordings ==
One of the earliest recordings of the song was likely performed by Lucy Isabelle Marsh.

Paul Whiteman's version - recorded April 8, 1924 (Victor 19345) was very popular in 1924.

Bing Crosby and The Merry Macs recorded the song on December 23, 1940 with Bob Crosby's Bob Cats.

Frank Sinatra recorded a version with the Tommy Dorsey Orchestra on August 19, 1941.

Jimmy Wakely (1952) and Tex Williams also recorded popular Western and Western Swing versions.

Betty Cody (1953) recorded another Western Swing version of the song

== Lyrics ==
The lyrics as published:

Out of my lodge at eventide,
'Mong the sobbing pine,
Footsteps echo by my side,
A spirit face, a sign.
Twilight skies are all alight
Across the deep lagoon.
A face is breaking through the night,
My Indian (maid) (brave), Pale Moon.

Speak to thy love forsaken,
Thy spirit mantle throw.
'Ere thou the great white dawn awaken
And to the sea thou swingest low,
Then to the west,
I'll follow across the deep lagoon,
Swift as a flying arrow,
To thy abode, Pale Moon.

== Bibliography ==
- Glick, Jesse G.M. (w.); Logan, Frederic Knight (m.). "Pale Moon (An Indian Love Song)." Chicago: Forster Music Publisher, Inc. (1920).
