= Richard Coburn =

American songwriter

- Born: June 8, 1886; Ipswich, Massachusetts
- Died: October 27, 1952 (aged 65–66); Phelan, California
- Occupation: Songwriter
- Children: 1

Richard Coburn, born Frank Reginald DeLong (June 8, 1886 – October 27, 1952) was an American songwriter.

== Early life ==
Coburn was born in Ipswich, Massachusetts.

== Career ==
Coburn's biggest hit was "Whispering," used by bandleader Paul Whiteman in 1920 or 1921; it brought popularity to both Whiteman and Coburn. It had a revival in the late 1940s. Frank Sinatra eventually covered it. Coburn also composed "Tell Me Why", "Oriental", "Mummy Mine", "Nightingale", "Behind a Silken Veil", "I'll Keep Loving You", "Day By Day", "Patsy", and "Day Dreaming". He created the lyrics for Carter DeHaven's Fancies.

== Personal life ==
Coburn was married to Ina De Long and had one son, Richard P. De Long. He was a member of the American Society of Composers, Authors and Publishers.

== Death ==
After an eight-month illness, Coburn died in Phelan, California.
