= James Cavanaugh (songwriter) =

American songwriter (1892–1967)

James Anthony Cavanaugh (New York City, 29 October 1892 - New York City, 18 August 1967) was an American songwriter. Among his best known songs were "Mississippi Mud" (1927, made popular by Bing Crosby), "Crosstown" (1940, co-written with John Redmond), and "The Gaucho Serenade" (title track of the soundtrack to the Gene Autry 1940 movie Gaucho Serenade).

== Biography ==
=== Marriage, work as chauffeur and military service during WWI ===
Born in 1892 in New York City, in 1917 Cavanaugh was living in Manhattan, at 511 W 130th St., was married to "Martha V. Conroy", and was working as a private chauffeur for a businessman at 43 West 55th St. also in Manhattan. In October of 1918, he was drafted despite this, but luckily the armistice was signed 11/11/18 and Cavanaugh was discharged honorably in mid-December in the general demobilization.

=== From chauffeur to professional songwriter, through a house moving and military service during WWII ===
James and Martha Cavanaugh would go on to raise six children. In the 1930 Census he still listed himself as a chauffeur, still living in Manhattan. In the 1940 US census, the family had moved to 316 East 184th Street in the Bronx, but Cavanaugh, despite having written successful songs for seven years by that time, still listed his occupation as "chauffeur". Finally, by 1942, when he registered for the "Old Man Draft" at the age of 50, he listed his employer as ASCAP, 30 Rockefeller Center, NYC, and he was already living in the Bronx (where he will live until his death in 1967): he had made the transition to become a professional songwriter.

== Songs ==
(Note: listing is incomplete)

- 1933 "I Like Mountain Music" Lyrics: James Cavanaugh, Music: Frank Weldon
- 1934 "Breakin' the Ice" Joseph McCarthy, James Cavanaugh and Weldon Thomas
- 1939 "Long Time No See" Arthur Altman and James Cavanaugh - recorded by the Andrews Sisters
- 1939 "Goody Goodbye" James Cavanaugh (lyrics) Nat Simon (music)
- 1940 "You're Breaking My Heart All Over Again" James Cavanaugh, Athur Altman and John Redmond - recorded by Vera Lynn
- 1944 "You're Nobody till Somebody Loves You" co-written with Russ Morgan and Larry Stock
- 1944 "I'm a Little on the Lonely Side" John Redmond, James Cavanaugh and Frank Weldon
- 1945 "I'd Do It All Over Again" Frank Weldon, James Cavanaugh and Dick Robertson
- 1945 "Dearest Darling" Dick Robertson, James Cavanaugh and Frank Weldon
- 1945 "Did You Ever Get That Feeling in the Moonlight?" James Cavanaugh, Larry Stock and Ira Schuster
- 1948 "The Little Old Lady of Threadneedle Street" co-written with Larry Stock and Guy Wood
- 1950 "Christmas in Killarney" again co-written with John Redmond and Frank Weldon
- 1951 "32 Feet and 8 Little Tails" John Redmond, James Cavanaugh and Frank Weldon
