= John Redmond (songwriter) =

American musician

John Redmond (February 25, 1906 – August 26, 1982) was an American songwriter. He was born John Redmond Lynskey and grew up in Clinton, Massachusetts. Among his better known songs was "Christmas in Killarney" (copyrighted 1950), co-written with James Cavanaugh and Frank Weldon.

In 1955, Redmond spearheaded the organization of the Religious Music Guild, along with Father Timothy Flynn, then director of radio and television for the Roman Catholic Archdiocese of New York. He subsequently devoted most of his remaining career as a songwriter to creating music for Catholic children. His Religious Music Guild produced two albums of these songs: Seven Songs on the Seven Sacraments and Twelve Songs on the Apostles' Creed. For Christmas 2016 the St. Augustine Academy Press came out with the first ever compilation of the sheet music for the Religious Music Guild songs. They also issued a remastered CD from the original vinyl, including a few Religious Music Guild songs originally on 45 r.p.m. records not included on the original LPs.
