= 1979 in music =

This is a list of notable events in music that took place in the year 1979.

== Specific locations ==
- 1979 in British music
- 1979 in Japanese music
- 1979 in Norwegian music
- 1979 in Scandinavian music

== Specific genres ==
- 1979 in country music
- 1979 in heavy metal music
- 1979 in hip-hop music
- 1979 in jazz
- 1979 in progressive rock

== Events ==
=== January–February ===
- January 1
  - Bill Graham closes San Francisco's Winterland Ballroom following a New Year's Eve performance by the Blues Brothers and the Grateful Dead.
  - During a New Year's Eve concert in Cleveland, Ohio, Bruce Springsteen is injured when a firecracker is thrown onstage from the audience.
- January 4 – The Star-Club in Hamburg, Germany, known for its connections to the early days of the Beatles, reopened.
- January 6 – ABC's American Bandstand featured the debut of the "Y.M.C.A. dance" using the hand gestures forming the letters YMCA during a broadcast with the Village People.
- January 9 – The Music for UNICEF Concert in held in New York City at the United Nations, starring the Bee Gees. Highlights are aired the following evening on NBC.
- January 13 – Singer Donny Hathaway dies after falling 15 stories from his hotel room in New York City. According to Hathaway's record company, Atlantic, the singer had been having some psychological problems.
- January 15 – MCA Records purchases ABC Records for a reported $20 million.
- February 2 – Sex Pistols bassist Sid Vicious is found dead from an overdose, a day after being released on bail from Rikers Island prison.
- February 7
  - The Clash kicked off their first concert of their first American tour at the Berkeley Community Theatre outside San Francisco. Bo Diddley opened the show.
  - Stephen Stills becomes the first major rock artist to record digitally, laying down four songs at The Record Plant in Los Angeles. None of the songs are released, and Ry Cooder becomes the first major rock artist to release a digitally recorded record.
- February 10 – Rod Stewart's "Do Ya Think I'm Sexy" hit No. 1 on the Billboard magazine charts, and stayed there for 4 weeks.
- February 11 – 43 million viewers watch "Elvis!" on ABC, a made-for-TV movie starring Kurt Russell as Elvis.
- February 14 – Following her 1972 sex reassignment surgery, musician Wendy Carlos legally changes her name from Walter. She reveals this information in an interview in the May 1979 issue of Playboy magazine.
- February 15
  - Minnie Riperton appears on the Grammys as a presenter with Stephen Bishop.
  - The 21st Annual Grammy Awards are presented in Los Angeles, hosted by John Denver. The Bee Gees collect 4 Grammys for the Saturday Night Fever soundtrack, including Album of the Year, while Billy Joel's "Just the Way You Are" wins both Record of the Year and Song of the Year. A Taste of Honey win Best New Artist.
- February 23 – Dire Straits begin their first U.S. tour in Boston.
- February 24
  - Friedrich Cerha's completion of Alban Berg's opera Lulu is premiered at the Opera Garnier in Paris.
  - Singer Johnnie Wilder, Jr. of Heatwave is paralyzed from the neck down in a car accident in his hometown of Dayton, Ohio.
- February 26 – B.B. King becomes the first blues artist to tour the Soviet Union, kicking off a one-month tour there.

=== March–April ===
- March 2–4 – Weather Report, The CBS Jazz All-Stars, the Trio of Doom, Fania All-Stars, Stephen Stills, Billy Swan, Bonnie Bramlett, Mike Finnegan, Kris Kristofferson, Rita Coolidge and Billy Joel, plus Cuban acts Irakere, Pacho Alonso, Elena Burke, Los Papines, Tata Güines and Orquesta Aragón play at the historic three-day Havana Jam festival at the Karl Marx Theater, in Havana, Cuba.
- March 5 – MCA Records dissolves ABC Records.
- March 10 – James Brown performs at the Grand Ole Opry.
- March 15 – Elvis Costello gets into a heated argument with members of Stephen Stills' touring entourage at a Holiday Inn in Columbus, Ohio, United States. After Costello makes disparaging and racist remarks, he is punched by Bonnie Bramlett. Costello suffers a wave of negative press coverage after the incident is made public.
- March 27 –
  - Eric Clapton marries Patti Boyd, ex-wife of Clapton's friend George Harrison.
  - Simple Minds make their first television appearance, performing the songs "Chelsea Girl" and "Life in a Day" on BBC's The Old Grey Whistle Test.
- March 31 – The Eurovision Song Contest, the biggest music festival in the world, takes place for the first time in a country outside Europe – Israel. The show is broadcast live from Jerusalem to Europe and a few countries in Asia. The big winner of this night is Israel for the second time in a row. The winning song is "Hallelujah" sung by the group Milk and Honey, including Gali Atari. A few months after winning the song had been translated into more than 82 languages, and broke a new record by entering the Guinness Book of Records as the most translated song in the world.
- April 2 – Kate Bush begins her first, and for 35 years, only tour. She becomes the first artist to use a wireless microphone, enabling her to sing and dance at the same time.
- April 6 – Rod Stewart marries Alana Hamilton.
- April 7 – 110,000 people attend the California Music Festival at the L.A. Memorial Coliseum. Performers include Aerosmith, The Boomtown Rats, Cheap Trick, Ted Nugent and Van Halen.
- April 12 – Mickey Thomas replaces Marty Balin as the lead singer of Jefferson Starship.
- April 13 – During a concert by Van Halen in Spokane, Washington, David Lee Roth collapses from exhaustion. A local doctor treats him for a stomach virus and advises him to "calm down".
- April 22 – The New Barbarians and The Rolling Stones perform two concerts in Oshawa, Ontario, Canada, to benefit the CNIB, as part of Keith Richards' 1978 sentence for heroin possession.
- April 27 – Ozzy Osbourne is fired as lead singer of Black Sabbath. He is replaced in May by Ronnie James Dio.

=== May–August ===
- May 1 – Elton John becomes one of the first Western pop musicians to perform in Israel.
- May 2 – The Who play their first concert following the death of drummer Keith Moon. The band performs with new drummer Kenney Jones at London's Rainbow Theatre.
- May 4 – Release as a single of Gary Numan's "Are "Friends" Electric?" with Tubeway Army; it becomes the first synth-pop single to reach number one on the UK Singles Chart.
- May 8 – Iron Maiden, Samson, and Angel Witch share a bill at the Music Machine in Camden, London. Critic Geoff Barton coins the term "New Wave of British Heavy Metal" in a review of the show for Sounds magazine.
- May 12 – Disco music occupies eight of the top ten spots of the Billboard Hot 100 chart, for two weeks. The charts are led by Peaches and Herb's R&B ballad single "Reunited".
- May 14 – Kate Bush plays the final date at the Hammersmith Odeon on her first-ever tour, which also turned out to be her last tour.
- May 19 – Three of the four ex-Beatles perform on the same stage, as Paul McCartney, George Harrison and Ringo Starr jam with Eric Clapton, Ginger Baker, Mick Jagger and others at a wedding reception for Clapton at his Surrey home.
- May 21
  - Elton John plays the first of eight concerts in the Soviet Union, making him the first western solo pop artist to tour there.
  - Orchestral Manoeuvres in the Dark release their debut single, "Electricity", which becomes integral to the rise of the UK's synth-pop movement.
- June 1 – The Alternative Tentacles record label is established by Dead Kennedys frontman Jello Biafra.
- June 8 – Marianne Faithfull marries Ben Brierly of The Vibrators.
- June 9 – The Bee Gees equal Bing Crosby, Elvis Presley, and The Beatles, with a record six consecutive number-one singles in the U.S. in less than a single calendar year with "Love You Inside Out".
- June 16 – Donna Summer becomes the first female to have the #1 single "Hot Stuff" and album Bad Girls for a second time.
- June 28 – Bill Haley makes his final studio recordings at Muscle Shoals, Alabama.
- June 30
  - Donna Summer becomes the first female artist to have 2 of the top 3 songs, Hot Stuff at #1 & Bad Girls at #3, on the Billboard Hot 100 chart. They will stay in the top 3 together for 4 weeks. In fact, all of the top 5 songs that week are entirely by women, both in Billboard and in Cashbox.
  - Tubeway Army reach number 1 on the UK Singles Chart with "Are 'Friends' Electric?" and become the first British act to have a synth pop hit single. The song will remain at number 1 for four consecutive weeks.
- July
  - EMI's first non-classical digital recording, of UK jazz-funk duo Morrissey–Mullen covering the Rose Royce hit "Love Don't Live Here Anymore", is recorded at Abbey Road Studios and later released as a limited edition vinyl EP.
  - George Martin's Associated Independent Recording opens its AIR Montserrat recording studio on the Caribbean island of Montserrat; the first album recorded here is Climax Blues Band's Real to Reel.
- July 1 – The Sony Walkman goes on sale in Japan.
- July 7 – The Bee Gees play to a sold-out crowd at Los Angeles' Dodger Stadium as part of their Spirits Having Flown tour.
- July 10 – Chuck Berry is sentenced to four months in prison for tax evasion by a Los Angeles judge.
- July 12 – "Disco Demolition Night", an anti-disco promotional event held by a Chicago rock station at Comiskey Park involving exploding disco records with a bomb, causes a near-riot between games during a baseball major league doubleheader, forcing the cancellation of the second game.
- July 14 – Donna Summer, for a third time in an eight-month period, scores a #1 single with "Bad Girls", (staying atop the charts for five weeks); and #1 album of the same name, which also tops the Billboard 200 for six weeks.
- July 21
  - With Bad Girls (both single and album), Donna Summer's success continues as she becomes the first female artist to sit on top of 3 major Billboard charts: the Billboard Hot 100, the Hot Soul Singles chart, and the Billboard 200. Disco dominates the Billboard Hot 100 chart, with the first six spots (beginning with Donna Summer's "Bad Girls"), and seven of the chart's top ten songs ending that week.
  - Tubeway Army reach number 1 on the UK Albums Chart with "Replicas".
- July 28 – Aerosmith and Ted Nugent headline the World Series of Rock at Municipal Stadium in Cleveland, Ohio. Also on the bill are Journey, Thin Lizzy, AC/DC and the Scorpions. Following the concert, Aerosmith guitarist Joe Perry quits the group after an argument with bandmates.
- July 31 – 250,000 turn out in Central Park for a free concert by James Taylor in a campaign to restore Sheep Meadow.
- August – Elton John and lyricist Bernie Taupin, having reunited after a three-year break, eventually record their first compositions since then, to be released a year later as 21 at 33.
- August 6 – Bauhaus releases debut single "Bela Lugosi's Dead", considered to be the first Gothic Rock release.
- August 10 – Michael Jackson releases his fifth studio album, Off the Wall, which would eventually become his first breakthrough album.
- August 18 – Nick Lowe and Carlene Carter are married at Carter's Los Angeles home.
- August 24 – Prince's first hit single "I Wanna Be Your Lover" is released in the US, reaching number one on the RnB and number 11 on the Hot 100, selling more than one million copies in the US.
- August 25 – "My Sharona" by The Knack hits #1 on the Billboard charts. This is the first time in over a year that a song hits #1 that is not either a disco song or a ballad, signalling the potential resurgence of rock.

=== September–December ===
- September 1 – INXS perform in public for the first time, at the Oceanview Hotel in Umina, New South Wales.
- September 2 – U2 enters the studio for the first time to record a locally released single.
- September 13 – ABBA begins ABBA: The Tour in Edmonton, Alberta, leading off a month of dates in North America.
- September 16 – The Sugarhill Gang release Rapper's Delight in the United States, the first rap single to become a Top 40 hit on the Billboard Hot 100.
- September 17 – Ontario Court of Appeals rejects a government appeal against the previous year's sentencing of Keith Richards, which allowed him to avoid jail time for his 1977 arrest in Toronto for heroin possession.
- September 19–23 – Musicians United for Safe Energy (MUSE) stages a series of five No Nukes concerts at Madison Square Garden. Jackson Browne, Crosby, Stills & Nash, Bruce Springsteen and the E Street Band, Bonnie Raitt, Tom Petty, James Taylor and Carly Simon are among the participants.
- September 22
  - Gary Numan hits number 1 on the UK Albums Chart with The Pleasure Principle, only two months after his Tubeway Army album Replicas had topped the chart.
  - The NewMusic, a Canadian weekly music and culture program, makes its début on Citytv.
- September 27 – Elton John collapses on stage at the Universal Amphitheatre in Los Angeles County, California while performing "Better Off Dead". He refuses to stop the show and resumes playing fifteen minutes later.
- October 10 – Joe Perry officially leaves Aerosmith.
- November 3 – Donna Summer becomes the first female artist to have 5 top 10 hits in the same year.
- November 16 – Infinity Records is shut down and absorbed into parent company MCA.
- November 17 – Donna Summer, for a second time, has two songs ("Dim All the Lights", #2, & "No More Tears (Enough is Enough)" with Barbra Streisand, #3) in the Top 3 of the Billboard Hot 100, and the first female to have 5 top 5 hits in the same year.
- November 24 – With "No More Tears (Enough is Enough)" hitting the top spot, Donna Summer becomes the first female artist to score 3 #1 singles in a calendar year on the Billboard Hot 100 charts.
- November 26 – Bill Haley & His Comets perform at the Theatre Royal, Drury Lane, London, in a command performance for Queen Elizabeth II. This was Haley's final recorded performance of "Rock Around the Clock".
- November 30 – Pink Floyd releases The Wall. It is one of rock's most well-known concept albums and one of the best-selling albums of all time. It is also the last album recorded with the line up of David Gilmour, Roger Waters, Nick Mason and Richard Wright.
- December – Iron Maiden is signed by EMI. They hire Dennis Stratton as a second guitarist.
- December 3 – In Cincinnati, a stampede for seats at Riverfront Coliseum during a Who concert kills 11 fans and injures 26 others. Band members were not informed of the deaths until after the show.
- December 8 – The 8th OTI Festival, held at the Theatre of the Military Academy in Caracas, Venezuela, is won by the song "Cuenta conmigo", written by Chico Novarro and Raúl Parentella, and performed by Daniel Riolobos representing Argentina.
- December 26 – Iron Maiden drummer Doug Sampson is replaced by ex-Samson drummer Clive Burr.
- December 26-29 – The Concerts for the People of Kampuchea are held over four nights at the Hammersmith Odeon in London to raise funds for victims of war in Cambodia. Queen, The Who, The Clash, Wings, Elvis Costello and members of Led Zeppelin all take part.
- December 31 – The eighth annual New Year's Rockin' Eve special airs on ABC, with appearances by The Oak Ridge Boys, Village People, Chic, Blondie and Barry Manilow.

=== Also in 1979 ===
- The Welsh Philharmonia becomes the Orchestra of Welsh National Opera.
- Michael Schenker leaves Scorpions during their tour in France and is replaced by Matthias Jabs.
- Stevie Wonder uses digital audio recording technology in recording his album Journey through the Secret Life of Plants.
- Disco reigns supreme this year, with several number-one hits from The Bee Gees and Donna Summer. Several artists who were not regarded as disco acts, scored major successes by releasing disco-oriented singles or albums, including new wave band Blondie with their first US number-one single "Heart of Glass", Rod Stewart with "Do Ya Think I'm Sexy?", and symphonic rock band Electric Light Orchestra with their UK No. 1 LP Discovery.

== Bands formed ==
See Musical groups established in 1979

== Bands disbanded ==
See Musical groups disestablished in 1979

== Bands reformed ==
The Chipmunks

== Albums released ==
=== January ===
Day	Album	Artist	Notes
5	Armed Forces	Elvis Costello & The Attractions	
15	Lovedrive	Scorpions	
16	Accept	Accept	
19	Sleep Dirt	Frank Zappa	
22	We Are Family	Sister Sledge	
25	Take Me Home	Cher	
26	Bustin' Out of L Seven	Rick James	
26	Valley of the Dolls	Generation X	
-	Strangers in the Night	UFO	Live
-	The Def Leppard E.P.	Def Leppard	Debut EP
-	Nervous Breakdown	Black Flag	Debut EP
-	Sinful	Angel	
-	Head First	The Babys	
-	Look Sharp!	Joe Jackson	
-	John Denver	John Denver	
-	Life for the Taking	Eddie Money	
-	Living Without Your Love	Dusty Springfield	
-	Madam Butterfly	Tavares	
-	Muddy "Mississippi" Waters – Live	Muddy Waters	Live
-	New Kind of Feeling	Anne Murray	
-	No Mean City	Nazareth	

=== February ===
Day	Album	Artist	Notes
2	Inflammable Material	Stiff Little Fingers	
5	Spirits Having Flown	Bee Gees	
19	Frenzy	Split Enz	
20	George Harrison	George Harrison	
23	Live (X Cert)	The Stranglers	Live
23	Scared to Dance	Skids	
23	The Great Rock 'n' Roll Swindle	Sex Pistols	Soundtrack
28	Rickie Lee Jones	Rickie Lee Jones	
N/A	Ambient 1: Music for Airports	Brian Eno	
N/A	Feets, Don't Fail Me Now	Herbie Hancock	
N/A	Breakfast at Sweethearts	Cold Chisel	
N/A	Don't Throw Stones	The Sports	
N/A	Enlightened Rogues	The Allman Brothers Band	
N/A	The Feeding of the 5000	Crass	
N/A	Force Majeure	Tangerine Dream	
N/A	Hard Times for Lovers	Judy Collins	
N/A	Under Heaven Over Hell	Streetheart	

=== March ===
Day	Album	Artist	Notes
1	No. 1 in Heaven	Sparks	
2	It's Alright with Me	Patti LaBelle	
5	A Million Vacations	Max Webster	
7	Strikes	Blackfoot	
7	Feel No Fret	Average White Band	
9	Angel Station	Manfred Mann's Earth Band	
9	Even Serpents Shine	The Only Ones	
9	Thriller	Eddie and the Hot Rods	
12	'Bout Love	Bill Withers	
13	Aux armes et cætera	Serge Gainsbourg	
15	Fate for Breakfast	Art Garfunkel	
15	Half Machine Lip Moves	Chrome	
16	Breakfast in America	Supertramp	
16	Danger Money	U.K.	
16	Overkill	Motörhead	
16	Manifesto	Roxy Music	
16	Bitanga i princeza	Bijelo dugme	
16	Live at the Witch Trials	The Fall	Debut
19	L.A.	The Beach Boys	
20	Evolution	Journey	
23	Van Halen II	Van Halen	
26	Go West	Village People	
27	You're Never Alone with a Schizophrenic	Ian Hunter	
29	Teenage Head	Teenage Head	
30	Just a Game	Triumph	
30	Secondhand Daylight	Magazine	
N/A	Desolation Angels	Bad Company	
N/A	Sheik Yerbouti	Frank Zappa	
N/A	Airwaves	Badfinger	
N/A	I Love You So	Natalie Cole	
N/A	Remote Control	The Tubes	
N/A	Rock n' Roll Nights	Bachman–Turner Overdrive	
N/A	Squeezing Out Sparks	Graham Parker and The Rumour	

=== April ===
Day	Album	Artist	Notes
6	Replicas	Tubeway Army	
6	Cool for Cats	Squeeze	
6	Euroman Cometh	Jean-Jacques Burnel	
10	I Love to Sing the Songs I Sing	Barry White	
13	Black Rose: A Rock Legend	Thin Lizzy	
13	Blue Kentucky Girl	Emmylou Harris	
20	Life in a Day	Simple Minds	
20	Gimme Some Neck	Ron Wood	
20	Million Mile Reflections	The Charlie Daniels Band	
20	My Father's Eyes	Amy Grant	
20	Y	The Pop Group	
23	Bob Dylan at Budokan	Bob Dylan	Live
23	Voulez-Vous	ABBA	
25	Bad Girls	Donna Summer	
27	New Values	Iggy Pop	UK
N/A	Exposure	Robert Fripp	Solo Debut
N/A	It's Alive	Ramones	Live
N/A	Mission Accomplished But the Beat Goes On	The Rezillos	Live
N/A	New Chautauqua	Pat Metheny	
N/A	New England	New England	

=== May ===
Day	Album	Artist	Notes
4	Orchestral Favorites	Frank Zappa	
11	Three Imaginary Boys	The Cure	Debut
17	Wave	Patti Smith Group	
18	Night Owl	Gerry Rafferty	
18	Do It Yourself	Ian Dury & The Blockheads	
18	Shades in Bed	The Records	Debut
22	Where There's Smoke...	Smokey Robinson	
23	The Boss	Diana Ross	
23	Dynasty	Kiss	
24	Great Balls of Fire	Dolly Parton	
25	Lodger	David Bowie	
30	Where I Should Be	Peter Frampton	
N/A	Saxon	Saxon	Debut
N/A	The Bells	Lou Reed	
N/A	Monolith	Kansas	
N/A	Rhapsodies	Rick Wakeman	
N/A	Spectral Mornings	Steve Hackett	
N/A	State of Shock	Ted Nugent	
N/A	Narita	Riot	Japan
N/A	Rock 'n' Roll High School	Various Artists	Soundtrack
N/A	Images at Twilight	Saga	
N/A	Flag	James Taylor	
N/A	In the Skies	Peter Green	
N/A	The Undertones	The Undertones	
N/A	Infinite Rider on the Big Dogma	Michael Nesmith	
N/A	Let Me Be Good to You	Lou Rawls	
N/A	Shot Through the Heart	Jennifer Warnes	

=== June ===
Day	Album	Artist	Notes
1	Discovery	Electric Light Orchestra	
1	This Boot Is Made for Fonk-N	Bootsy's Rubber Band	
5	Communiqué	Dire Straits	
5	I Am	Earth, Wind & Fire	
5	Best of The J. Geils Band	The J. Geils Band	
8	Back to the Egg	Wings	
8	The Kids Are Alright	The Who	Soundtrack
8	Labour of Lust	Nick Lowe	
8	Repeat When Necessary	Dave Edmunds	
11	Get the Knack	The Knack	
13	Candy-O	The Cars	
13	Mingus	Joni Mitchell	
15	Unknown Pleasures	Joy Division	Debut
15	Secrets	Robert Palmer	
15	PXR5	Hawkwind	
15	Silent Letter	America	
19	Mirrors	Blue Öyster Cult	
22	Live Killers	Queen	Live
22	Mick Taylor	Mick Taylor	
25	Secret Omen	Cameo	
N/A	Survivors	Samson	Debut
N/A	Spy	Carly Simon	
N/A	Another Taste	A Taste of Honey	
N/A	Armageddon	Prism	
N/A	Door, Door	The Boys Next Door	
N/A	Life and Love	Leon Russell	
N/A	One for the Road	Willie Nelson and Leon Russell	
N/A	No Exit	The Angels	
N/A	Si todo hiciera Crack	Crack	
N/A	Touch the Sky	Carole King	
N/A	Underdog	Atlanta Rhythm Section	

=== July ===
Day	Album	Artist	Notes
2	Rust Never Sleeps	Neil Young and Crazy Horse	
6	The B-52's	The B-52's	
10	Low Budget	The Kinks	US
16	Oh What a Feeling	Mavis Staples	
16	Screaming Targets	Jo Jo Zep & The Falcons	
19	The Records	The Records	US Version of Shades in Bed
20	Nine Lives	REO Speedwagon	
27	Highway to Hell	AC/DC	
27	Exposed	Mike Oldfield	Live
27	John Cougar	John Cougar	
30	Risqué	Chic	
N/A	Bop till You Drop	Ry Cooder	
N/A	Can	Can	
N/A	Circles & Seasons	Pete Seeger	
N/A	First Under the Wire	Little River Band	
N/A	Fool Around	Rachel Sweet	US version
N/A	Gamma 1	Gamma	
N/A	Honest Lullaby	Joan Baez	
N/A	Midnight Magic	Commodores	
N/A	No Promises...No Debts	Golden Earring	
N/A	The Original Disco Man	James Brown	
N/A	Shake Hands with the Devil	Kris Kristofferson	

=== August ===
Day	Album	Artist	Notes
1	String of Hits	The Shadows	
1	Volcano	Jimmy Buffett	
3	Down to Earth	Rainbow	
3	Fear of Music	Talking Heads	
3	Some Product: Carri on Sex Pistols	Sex Pistols	Interview collage
10	Ghostown	The Radiators	
10	Off the Wall	Michael Jackson	
13	Chicago 13	Chicago	
17	Drums and Wires	XTC	
17	Rose Royce IV: Rainbow Connection	Rose Royce	
17	Slow Train Coming	Bob Dylan	
22	In Through the Out Door	Led Zeppelin	
22	The Rose	Bette Midler	Soundtrack to 1979 film
27	In the Heat of the Night	Pat Benatar	
30	Big Fun	Shalamar	
N/A	5	J.J. Cale	
N/A	Born Again	Randy Newman	
N/A	Children of the Sun	Billy Thorpe	
N/A	Into the Music	Van Morrison	

=== September ===
Day	Album	Artist	Notes
4	Flying Colors	Trooper	
6	La Diva	Aretha Franklin	
6	Ladies' Night	Kool & the Gang	
7	The Pleasure Principle	Gary Numan	Solo Debut
7	Night After Night	U.K.	Live
7	Join Hands	Siouxsie and the Banshees	
7	Rock 'n' Roll Juvenile	Cliff Richard	
7	Cut	The Slits	
11	Head Games	Foreigner	
11	Kost u grlu	Riblja Čorba	
14	Stormwatch	Jethro Tull	
17	Joe's Garage Act I	Frank Zappa	
19	New Picnic Time	Pere Ubu	
21	Boogie Motel	Foghat	
21	A Different Kind of Tension	Buzzcocks	
21	Dream Police	Cheap Trick	
21	Here	Leo Sayer	
21	Lovehunter	Whitesnake	
21	Oceans of Fantasy	Boney M.	
21	The Raven	The Stranglers	
21	Uncle Jam Wants You	Funkadelic	
21	Unleashed in the East	Judas Priest	Live
24	The Long Run	Eagles	
26	Three	U2	Debut/EP
25	Entertainment!	Gang of Four	
25	One Voice	Barry Manilow	
25	Singles Going Steady	Buzzcocks	Compilation
25	Solid State Survivor	Yellow Magic Orchestra	
27	Recent Songs	Leonard Cohen	
28	Eat to the Beat	Blondie	
N/A	154	Wire	
N/A	The Adventures of the Hersham Boys	Sham 69	
N/A	Eve	The Alan Parsons Project	
N/A	The Glow	Bonnie Raitt	
N/A	Kenny	Kenny Rogers	
N/A	Legends of the Lost and Found	Harry Chapin	Live
N/A	Live and Sleazy	Village People	Double LP; one disc live, one disc studio
N/A	Marathon	Santana	
N/A	Night Rains	Janis Ian	
N/A	Out of a Dream	Reba McEntire	
N/A	Power Play	Dragon	
N/A	Quadrophenia	The Who	Soundtrack
N/A	Satisfied	Rita Coolidge	
N/A	Street Machine	Sammy Hagar	
N/A	This Heat	This Heat	
N/A	Top Priority	Rory Gallagher	
N/A	Western Culture	Henry Cow	

=== October ===
Day	Album	Artist	Notes
1	Return to Base	Slade	
2	Survival	Bob Marley & The Wailers	
5	Reggatta de Blanc	The Police	
5	The Fine Art of Surfacing	The Boomtown Rats	
5	I'm the Man	Joe Jackson	
5	A Curious Feeling	Tony Banks	Solo Debut
5	Reproduction	The Human League	Debut
5	Partners in Crime	Rupert Holmes	
12	Tusk	Fleetwood Mac	US
12	Bomber	Motörhead	
12	Mr. Universe	Gillan	
12	Whatever You Want	Status Quo	
12	Victim of Love	Elton John	
12	Greatest Hits, Vol. 1	Rod Stewart	Compilation
12	Days in Europa	The Skids	
15	On the Radio: Greatest Hits Volumes I & II	Donna Summer	Compilation
16	Fire It Up	Rick James	
16	The Message Is Love	Barry White	
19	Prince	Prince	
19	Damn the Torpedoes	Tom Petty & the Heartbreakers	
19	One Step Beyond...	Madness	
19	The Specials	The Specials	
22	Prisoner	Cher	
23	You Know How to Love Me	Phyllis Hyman	
23	Mix-Up	Cabaret Voltaire	
26	Hydra	Toto	
26	Dragnet	The Fall	
29	Greatest Hits Volume 2	ABBA	Compilation
30	Stevie Wonder's Journey Through "The Secret Life of Plants"	Stevie Wonder	
N/A	Cornerstone	Styx	
N/A	Bee Gees Greatest	Bee Gees	Compilation
N/A	Cut Above the Rest	Sweet	UK
N/A	Flirtin' with Disaster	Molly Hatchet	
N/A	Harder ... Faster	April Wine	
N/A	Head Injuries	Midnight Oil	
N/A	I'll Always Love You	Anne Murray	
N/A	Keep the Fire	Kenny Loggins	
N/A	Magnum II	Magnum	
N/A	Primal Park	Mondo Rock	
N/A	Reality Effect	The Tourists	
N/A	Rockin' into the Night	38 Special	
N/A	Thighs and Whispers	Bette Midler	
N/A	Wet	Barbra Streisand	
N/A	(GI)	Germs	

=== November ===
Day	Album	Artist	Notes
1	Freedom at Point Zero	Jefferson Starship	
2	On Parole	Motörhead	Recorded in 1976
2	Broken English	Marianne Faithfull	
6	Pretty Paper	Willie Nelson	Christmas
9	The Soundhouse Tapes	Iron Maiden	Debut/EP
9	Machine Gun Etiquette	The Damned	
14	Live Rust	Neil Young & Crazy Horse	Live
14	Down on the Farm	Little Feat	
16	Emerson, Lake and Palmer in Concert	Emerson, Lake & Palmer	Live
16	Night in the Ruts	Aerosmith	
16	Setting Sons	The Jam	
19	Joe's Garage Acts II & III	Frank Zappa	
23	Real to Real Cacophony	Simple Minds	
23	Platinum	Mike Oldfield	
23	ELO's Greatest Hits	Electric Light Orchestra	Compilation
23	Metal Box	Public Image Ltd.	
23	The Raincoats	The Raincoats	Debut
23	Live! Coast to Coast	Teddy Pendergrass	Live
28	Gloryhallastoopid	Parliament	
30	The Wall	Pink Floyd	
30	New York–London–Paris–Munich	M	
30	Dirk Wears White Sox	Adam and the Ants	
N/A	Brass Construction 5	Brass Construction	
N/A	Degüello	ZZ Top	
N/A	English Garden	Bruce Woolley and the Camera Club	
N/A	Get Wet	Mental As Anything	
N/A	Masterjam	Rufus	
N/A	No Nukes: The Muse Concerts for a Non-Nuclear Future	Various Artists	Triple Live LP
N/A	Not Like Everybody Else!	Jimmy and the Boys	
N/A	Phoenix	Dan Fogelberg	
N/A	The Reels	The Reels	
N/A	Sometimes You Win	Dr. Hook	
N/A	We're the Best of Friends	Natalie Cole & Peabo Bryson	

=== December ===
Day	Album	Artist	Notes
7	Quiet Life	Japan	International
14	London Calling	The Clash	
20	Christopher Cross	Christopher Cross	Warner Bros.
27	Adventures in Utopia	Utopia	
31	Score	Carol Lloyd	
N/A	20 Jazz Funk Greats	Throbbing Gristle	
N/A	Sid Sings	Sid Vicious	
N/A	September Morn	Neil Diamond	
N/A	Les Plus Grands Succès De Chic: Chic's Greatest Hits	Chic	
N/A	Sabotage/Live	John Cale	Live

=== Release date unknown ===
- 3D – The Three Degrees
- An American Dream - The Nitty Gritty Dirt Band
- Art of the Acoustic Steel String Guitar 6 & 12 – Robbie Basho
- The Beat – The Beat
- The Beatles Concerto – John Rutter
- Breaking Loose – Helix
- Buona domenica – Antonello Venditti
- Buy – James Chance & the Contortions
- California – Gianna Nannini
- The Candidate – Steve Harley
- Casino Classics: Chapter One – Various artists
- Chance Meeting on a Dissecting Table of a Sewing Machine and an Umbrella – Nurse With Wound
- A Classy Pair – Ella Fitzgerald and Count Basie
- The Crack – The Ruts
- Deltics – Chris Rea
- Demo EP – Oingo Boingo
- Disco Nights – GQ
- Digital III at Montreux – Ella Fitzgerald, Count Basie and Joe Pass
- Divine Love – Leo Smith
- Don't Fight It – Red Rider
- Earthquake – Electric Sun
- Fine and Mellow – Ella Fitzgerald
- French Skyline – Earthstar
- Future Now – Pleasure
- Grosses Wasser – Cluster
- Hair – Various Artists – Soundtrack
- Identify Yourself – The O'Jays
- I Wanna Play For You - Stanley Clarke
- The Innes Book of Records – Neil Innes
- Invasion of the Booty Snatchers – Parlet
- Is There More to Life Than Dancing? – Noël
- Jardin Au Fou – Hans-Joachim Roedelius
- John Fahey Visits Washington D.C. – John Fahey
- The Kenny Rogers Singles Album – Kenny Rogers
- Lenox Avenue Breakdown – Arthur Blythe
- Let's Drip Awhile – Jo Jo Zep & The Falcons - Live
- Live & Direct - Taj Mahal - Live
- Live! Go for What You Know – Pat Travers Band
- Living Dub Vol. 1 - Burning Spear
- Loleatta Holloway - Loleatta Holloway
- The London Concert – Oscar Peterson
- Looking for Saint Tropez – Telex
- Lots of Luv' – Luv'
- Lubbock (On Everything) – Terry Allen
- Making a Name for Myself - Roger Miller
- Morning Dance – Spyro Gyra
- A Night at Studio 54 – Various artists
- Nuba – Andrew Cyrille, Jeanne Lee, Jimmy Lyons
- On the Road Again – Roy Wood
- A Perfect Match – Ella Fitzgerald and Count Basie
- Press Color - Lizzy Mercier Descloux
- Push Pull - Jimmy Lyons
- Rainbow's End – Resurrection Band
- Rise – Herb Alpert
- Rockit – Chuck Berry
- Rock On – Raydio
- The Roches – The Roches
- Silent Cries and Mighty Echoes – Eloy
- Sky – Sky
- A Slice of the Top – Hank Mobley with Lee Morgan
- Slumberin' on the Cumberland - John Hartford
- Songs of Love – Anita Ward
- Star Trek: The Motion Picture – Jerry Goldsmith – Soundtrack
- Stations of the Crass – Crass
- Street Life – The Crusaders
- Stone Crazy! – Buddy Guy
- Take It Home – B.B. King
- Tango Palace - Dr. John
- Teenage Warning – Angelic Upstarts
- Thanks, I'll Eat It Here – Lowell George
- Tiger in the Rain – Michael Franks
- Together Again – The Dubliners
- True Luv' – Luv'
- The Very Best of Leo Sayer – Leo Sayer
- Walking on Sunshine – Eddy Grant
- Washes Whiter Than – Petra

== Biggest hit singles ==
The following songs achieved the highest chart positions in the charts of 1979.

#	Artist	Title	Year	Country	Chart entries
1	Blondie	Heart of Glass	1979	(United States)	UK 1 – Jan 1979, US BB 1 – Mar 1979, Canada 1 – Mar 1979, Austria 1 – Mar 1979, Switzerland 1 – Feb 1979, Germany 1 – Feb 1979, Australia 1 for 5 weeks Jan 1980, Sweden (alt) 3 – Mar 1979, France 3 – Feb 1979, Australia 3 of 1979, Netherlands 5 – Feb 1979, Norway 5 – Mar 1979, RYM 8 of 1979, US CashBox 11 of 1979, US BB 1 of 1979, POP 13 of 1979, South Africa 15 of 1979, Italy 29 of 1979, Virgin 29, OzNet 30, Scrobulate 46 of 80s, Germany 54 of the 1970s, RIAA 217, Acclaimed 241, Rolling Stone 255
2	Chic	Le Freak	1978	(United States)	US Billboard 1 - Oct 1978 (24 weeks), US CashBox 1 of 1979, Record World 1 - 1978, US Radio 1 of 1978 (peak 1 16 weeks), Canada RPM 1 for 2 weeks - Jan 1979, New Zealand 1 for 4 weeks - Jan 1979, RIANZ 1 - Dec 1978 (19 weeks), Australia 1 for 5 weeks - Feb 1979, Springbok 1 - Feb 1979 (14 weeks), Grammy Hall of Fame in 2015 (1978), Library of Congress artifact added 2017 (1978), Holland 2 - Dec 1978 (20 weeks), France (SNEP) 2 - Feb 1979 (4 months), Switzerland 2 - Jan 1979 (14 weeks), Belgium 2 - Dec 1978 (14 weeks), US Platinum (certified by RIAA in Dec 1978), US BB 3 of 1979, Canada 3 - Dec 1978 (20 weeks), France 3 - Feb 1979 (3 weeks), Brazil 4 of 1979, UK Gold (certified by BPI in Apr 1979), Germany 5 - Jan 1979 (5 months), ODK Germany 5 - Jan 1979 (22 weeks) (9 weeks in top 10), Sweden (alt) 6 - Dec 1978 (18 weeks), Austria 6 - Feb 1979 (4 months), UK 7 - Nov 1978 (16 weeks), Australia 8 of 1979, South Africa 8 of 1979, Norway 9 - Apr 1979 (3 weeks), Italy 12 of 1979, WABC NY 13 of 1979, Scrobulate 13 of disco, Switzerland 17 of 1979, Billboard 50th song 19, 55th Billboard 100 21 (1978), Billboard100 22, POP 26 of 1978, Canada 42 of 1979, France (InfoDisc) 51 of the 1970s (peak 2, 30 weeks, 700k sales estimated, 1978), nuTsie 80 of 1970s, Germany 270 of the 1970s (peak 5 15 weeks), Acclaimed 365 (1978), OzNet 761, RYM 55 of 1978, Guardian Dance 4, Global 33 (5 M sold) - 1979, one of the Rock and Roll Hall of Fame 500
3	Gloria Gaynor	I Will Survive	1978	(United States)	UK 1 – Feb 1979, US BB 1 – Jan 1979, US BB 1 of 1979, Canada 1 – Mar 1979, Republic of Ireland 1 – Mar 1979, POP 2 of 1979, Sweden (alt) 3 – Apr 1979, Netherlands 4 – Mar 1979, Norway 4 – May 1979, Switzerland 7 – Apr 1979, Scrobulate 8 of disco, Germany 9 – Mar 1979, US CashBox 10 of 1979, France 10 – Mar 1979, South Africa 16 of 1979, Austria 17 – May 1979, Party 24 of 1999, Australia 25 of 1979, Italy 38 of 1979, Europe 66 of the 1970s, RYM 67 of 1978, RIAA 89, OzNet 155, Acclaimed 416, Rolling Stone 489
4	Patrick Hernandez	Born to Be Alive	1979	(France)	Sweden (alt) 1 – Jul 1979 (20 weeks), France (SNEP) 1 – Feb 1979 (5 months), France 1 – Mar 1979 (5 weeks), Austria 1 – Apr 1979 (6 weeks), Norway 1 – Jul 1979 (17 weeks), Belgium 1 – Jan 1979 (18 weeks), Germany 1 – Mar 1979 (6 months), Canada RPM 1 for 2 weeks – Aug 1979, New Zealand 1 for 2 weeks – Oct 1979, RIANZ 1 – Sep 1979 (14 weeks), Australia 1 for 5 weeks – Oct 1979, France 1 for 15 weeks – Mar 1979, Germany 1 for 5 weeks – May 1979, France (InfoDisc) 4 of the 1970s (peak 1, 30 weeks, 1,412k sales estimated, 1979), US Gold (certified by RIAA in Nov 1979), Germany Gold (certified by BMieV in 1979), Netherlands 5 – Feb 1979 (18 weeks), Switzerland 5 – Feb 1979 (13 weeks), Australia 5 of 1979, Springbok 6 – Aug 1979 (11 weeks), Italy 7 of 1979, UK 10 – Jun 1979 (14 weeks), POP 11 of 1979, Canada 12 – Jul 1979 (6 weeks), US BB 15 of 1979, US Billboard 16 – Jun 1979 (19 weeks), Record World 19 – 1979, Germany 20 of the 1970s (peak 1 25 weeks), Brazil 32 of 1979, Scrobulate 68 of disco, US Radio 108 of 1979 (peak 16 5 weeks), RYM 200 of 1979, UK Silver (certified by BPI in Sep 1979), Global 7 (10 M sold) – 1979
5	Bee Gees	Tragedy	1979	(United Kingdom)	UK 1 - Feb 1979 (10 weeks), US Billboard 1 - Feb 1979 (20 weeks), Record World 1 - 1979, Canada 1 - Feb 1979 (16 weeks), France 1 - Mar 1979 (4 weeks), Italy 1 for 7 weeks - Mar 1979, Eire 1 for 2 weeks - Feb 1979, Canada RPM 1 for 4 weeks - Mar 1979, New Zealand 1 for 6 weeks - Mar 1979, RIANZ 1 - Mar 1979 (13 weeks), Europe 1 for 5 weeks - Mar 1979, France 1 for 4 weeks - Feb 1979, Austria 2 - Apr 1979 (4 months), Switzerland 2 - Mar 1979 (10 weeks), Belgium 2 - Feb 1979 (11 weeks), ODK Germany 2 - Feb 1979 (20 weeks) (10 weeks in top 10), Springbok 2 - Apr 1979 (9 weeks), US Platinum (certified by RIAA in May 1979), France (SNEP) 3 - Mar 1979 (4 months), Holland 4 - Feb 1979 (10 weeks), Norway 4 - Mar 1979 (7 weeks), Italy 4 of 1979, Germany 4 - Mar 1979 (3 months), UK Gold (certified by BPI in Feb 1979), Sweden (alt) 6 - Mar 1979 (12 weeks), Brazil 8 of 1979, Canada 12 of 1979, France (InfoDisc) 14 of the 1970s (peak 1, 26 weeks, 821k sales estimated, 1979), South Africa 14 of 1979, US BB 16 of 1979, US Radio 17 of 1979 (peak 1 11 weeks), US CashBox 19 of 1979, WABC NY 23 of 1979, Scrobulate 79 of disco, OzNet 106, Germany 227 of the 1970s (peak 2 13 weeks), RYM 136 of 1979

== Chronological list of US and UK and Japan number-one hit singles ==
US number-one singles and artist
(weeks at No. 1)

- "Babe" – Styx (2)
- "Bad Girls" – Donna Summer (5)
- "Da Ya Think I'm Sexy?" – Rod Stewart (4)
- "Don't Stop 'Til You Get Enough" – Michael Jackson (1)
- "Escape (The Piña Colada Song)" – Rupert Holmes (2 weeks in 1979 + 1 week in 1980)
- "Good Times" – Chic (1)
- "Heart of Glass" – Blondie (1)
- "Heartache Tonight" – The Eagles (1)
- "Hot Stuff" – Donna Summer (3)
- "I Will Survive" – Gloria Gaynor (3)
- "Knock on Wood" – Amii Stewart (1)
- "Le Freak" – Chic (3 weeks in 1978 + 3 weeks in 1979)
- "Love You Inside Out" – Bee Gees (1)
- "My Sharona" – The Knack (6)
- "No More Tears (Enough is Enough)" – Barbra Streisand & Donna Summer (2)
- "Pop Muzik" – M (1)
- "Reunited" – Peaches & Herb (4)
- "Ring My Bell" – Anita Ward (2)
- "Rise" – Herb Alpert (2)
- "Sad Eyes" – Robert John (1)
- "Still" – Commodores (1)
- "Too Much Heaven" – Bee Gees (2)
- "Tragedy" – Bee Gees (2)
- "What a Fool Believes" – The Doobie Brothers (1)
- Also see: Hot 100 No. 1 Hits of 1979

UK number-one singles and artist
(weeks at No. 1)

- "Another Brick in the Wall, Part II" – Pink Floyd (3 weeks in 1979 + 2 weeks in 1980)
- "Are 'Friends' Electric?" – Tubeway Army (4)
- "Bright Eyes" – Art Garfunkel (6)
- "Cars" – Gary Numan (1)
- "Heart of Glass" – Blondie (4)
- "Hit Me With Your Rhythm Stick" – Ian Dury and The Blockheads (1)
- "I Don't Like Mondays" – The Boomtown Rats (4)
- "I Will Survive" – Gloria Gaynor (4)
- "Message in a Bottle" – The Police (3)
- "One Day at a Time" – Lena Martell (3)
- "Ring My Bell" – Anita Ward (2)
- "Sunday Girl" – Blondie (3)
- "Tragedy" – Bee Gees (2)
- "Video Killed the Radio Star" – The Buggles (1)
- "Walking on the Moon" – The Police (1)
- "We Don't Talk Anymore" – Cliff Richard (4)
- "When You're in Love with a Beautiful Woman" – Dr. Hook (3)
- "Y.M.C.A." – Village People (3)

Japanese Oricon number-one singles and artist
(weeks at No. 1)

- Chameleon Army – Pink Lady (4 weeks in 1979 + 2 weeks in 1978)
- "Champion" – Alice (4)
- "Hero (Hero ni Naru Toki, Sore wa Ima)" – Kai Band (2)
- Young Man (Y.M.C.A.) – Hideki Saijo (5)
- "Miserarete" – Judy Ongg (9)
- "Kimi no Asa" – Satoshi Kishida (5)
- "Omoide-zake" – Sachiko Kobayashi (1)
- "Kanpaku Sengen" – Masashi Sada (10)
- "Sexual Violet No. 1" – Masahiro Kuwana (3)
- "Oyaji no Ichiban Nagai Hi" – Masashi Sada (6)
- "Ihojin" – Saki Kubota (4 weeks in 1979 + 3 weeks in 1980)

== Top 40 Chart hit singles ==
Song title	Artist(s)	Release date(s)	US	UK	Highest chart position	Other Chart Performance(s)
"99"	Toto	December 1979	26	n/a	26 (US)	17 (Canada) - 97 (Australia)
"Accidents Will Happen"	Elvis Costello and the Attractions	May 1979	101	28	28 (UK)	n/a
"After the Love Has Gone"	Earth, Wind & Fire	July 1979	2	4	2 (US)	See chart performance entry
"Ain't No Stoppin' Us Now"	McFadden & Whitehead	April 1979	13	5	1 (U.S. Billboard Hot R&B)	See chart performance entry
"Angel Eyes"	Roxy Music	August 1979	n/a	4	4 (UK, Belgium)	See chart performance entry
"Angeleyes"	ABBA	July 1979	64	3	3 (UK)	37 (US Adult Contemporary [Billboard]) - 76 (US Cashbox Top 100 Singles)
"Baby I'm Burning"	Dolly Parton	January 1979	25	n/a	1 (Canada Country Singles)	See chart performance entry
"Baby It's You"	Promises	February 1979	n/a	n/a	1 (New Zealand)	2 (Australia) - 4 (West Germany) - 12 (Belgium)
"Bad Case of Loving You (Doctor, Doctor)"	Robert Palmer	July 1979	14	61	1 (Canada)	See chart performance entry
"The Ballad of Lucy Jordan"	Marianne Faithfull	October 1979	n/a	48	2 (Austria)	See chart performance entry
"Better Love Next Time"	Dr. Hook	October 1979	12	8	7 (Ireland)	See chart performance entry
"Big Shot"	Billy Joel	January 1979	14	n/a	13 (Canada)	13 (U.S. Cash Box Top 100) - 36 (New Zealand) - 91 (Australia)
"Boogie Wonderland"	Earth, Wind & Fire with the Emotions	May 1979	6	4	2 (France, Norway, US Hot Soul Singles)	See chart performance entry
"Born to Be Alive"	Patrick Hernandez	January 1979	16	10	1 (13 Countries)	See chart performance entry
"Boys Keep Swinging"	David Bowie	April 1979	n/a	7	7 (UK)	16 (Netherlands) - 18 (Belgium) - 19 (Ireland) - 51 (Spain) - 85 (Australia)
"Breakfast in America"	Supertramp	June 1979	62	9	6 (Ireland)	See chart performance entry
"Broken Hearted Me"	Anne Murray	September 1979	12	n/a	15 (Canada)	1 (Canada Country Tracks) - 1 (Canada Adult Contemporary) - 1 (US Hot Country Singles [Billboard]) - 1 (US Adult Contemporary [Billboard])
"Can't Stand Losing You"	The Police	June 1979	n/a	2	2 (United Kingdom)	See chart performance entry
"Casanova"	Luv'	April 1979	n/a	n/a	2 (Austria, Denmark, Europe, Netherlands)	See chart performance entry
"Chuck E.'s In Love"	Rickie Lee Jones	April 1979	4	18	4 (United States)	See chart performance entry
"Computer Games"	Mi-Sex	September 1979	n/a	n/a	1 (Australia)	2 (Canada) - 5 (New Zealand) - 16 (Austria) - 44 (Netherlands) - 61 (US Hot Dance Club Songs)
"Cool For Cats"	Squeeze	March 1979	n/a	2	2 (United Kingdom)	5 (Australia) - 11 (New Zealand) - 33 (Netherlands (Single Top 100)) - 39 (Netherlands (Dutch Top 40))
"Crazy Little Thing Called Love"	Queen	October 1979	1	2	1 (4 countries)	See chart performance entry
"Chiquitita"	ABBA	January 1979	29	2	1 (5 countries)	See chart performance entry
"The Cost of Living"	The Clash	May 1979	n/a	22	22 (United Kingdom)	24 (Ireland)
"Crazy Love"	Poco	January 1979	17	n/a	17 (United States)	1 (US Billboard Adult Contemporary) - 7 (US Radio & Records chart) - 15 (Canada RPM Top Singles) - 73 (Australia)
"Cruel to Be Kind"	Nick Lowe	August 1979	12	12	12 (Australia, United Kingdom, United States)	12 (Canada RPM Top Singles, U.S. Cash Box Top 100) - 34 (New Zealand)
"Dance Away"	Roxy Music	April 1979	44	2	1 (Ireland)	8 (Netherlands) - 10 (New Zealand) - 12 (Belgium) - 20 (Sweden) - 30 (West Germany) - 75 (Canada) - 92 (Australia)
"Dance the Night Away"	Van Halen	April 1979	15	n/a	15 (United States)	28 (Canada)
"Dancin' Shoes"	Nigel Olsson	January 1979	18	n/a	18 (United States)	62 (Australia)
"The Devil Went Down to Georgia"	Charlie Daniels Band	May 1979	3	14	3 (United States)	1 (Canada Country Tracks, US Billboard Hot Country Songs) - 4 (US Cash Box Top 100) - 5 (Canada) - 13 (New Zealand) - 14 (Australia, Ireland, United Kingdom) - 25 (Netherlands Dutch Top 20) - 30 (US Billboard Adult Contemporary)
"The Diary of Horace Wimp"	Electric Light Orchestra	July 1979	n/a	8	8 (United Kingdom)	10 (Ireland) - 48 (Australia) - 52 (West Germany)
"Dim All the Lights"	Donna Summer	August 1979	2	29	2 (United States)	See chart entry performance
"Disco Nights (Rock-Freak)"	GQ	February 1979	12	42	12 (United States)	1 (US Billboard Hot Soul Singles) - 3 (US Billboard Dance Club Songs) - 97 (Australia)
"Do Anything You Want To"	Thin Lizzy	June 1979	81	14	14 (United Kingdom)	25 (Ireland)
"Do That to Me One More Time"	Captain & Tennille	October 1979	1	7	1 (Belgium, Netherlands, South Africa, United States)	See chart performance entry
"Does Your Mother Know"	ABBA	April 1979	19	4	1 (Belgium, Europe)	See chart performance entry
"Don't Bring Me Down"	Electric Light Orchestra	August 1979	4	3	1 (Canada)	See chart entry performance
"Don't Cry Out Loud"	Melissa Manchester	January 1979	10	n/a	9 (Canada)	2 (Canada RPM Adult Contemporary) - 9 (US Billboard Adult Contemporary) - 10 (US Cash Box Top 100) - 57 (Australia) [Released in October 1978 and continued charting in 1979]
"Don't Do Me Like That"	Tom Petty and the Heartbreakers	November 1979	10	n/a	3 (Canada)	7 (U.S. Cash Box Top 100) - 17 (New Zealand)
"Don't Stop Til You Get Enough"	Michael Jackson	July 1979	1	3	1 (8 countries)	See chart performance entry
"Dream Police"	Cheap Trick	September 1979	26	n/a	5 (Australia)	7 (New Zealand) - 9 (Canada) - 37 (Netherlands Dutch Top 40) - 79 (Japan)
"Dreaming"	Blondie	September 1979	27	2	2 (United Kingdom)	See chart entry performance
Driver's Seat"	Sniff 'n' the Tears	May 1979	15	42	1 (Netherlands [Dutch Top 40]/[Single Top 100]	See chart entry performance
"Dschinghis Khan"	Dschinghis Khan	March 1979	n/a	n/a	1 (West Germany)	3 (Norway, Switzerland) - 5 (Finland) - 8 (Austria) - 20 (Belgium)
"Every Day Hurts"	Sad Café	August 1979	n/a	3	3 (United Kingdom)	78 (Australia)
"Fire"	The Pointer Sisters	March 1979	2*	34	1 (4 countries)	See chart entry performance *1978 in US
"Get Used to It"	Roger Voudouris	March 1979	22	n/a	4 (Australia)	18 (US Billboard Adult Contemporary) - 22 (US Cash Box Top 100) - 20 (New Zealand) - 45 (Canada)
"Gimme! Gimme! Gimme! (A Man After Midnight)"	ABBA	October 1979	n/a	3	1 (6 countries)	See chart entry performances
"Girls Talk"	Dave Edmunds	May 1979	65	4	4 (United Kingdom)	9 (Australia) - 11 (Ireland) - 18 (Canada) - 65 (US Cash Box Top 100)
"Go West"	Village People	June 1979	45	15	12 (Belgium)	13 (Canada) - 14 (US Billboard Dance Club Songs) - 15 (Ireland, United Kingdom) - 29 (Netherlands [Single Top 100]) - 31 (Netherlands [Dutch Top 40)] - 41 (Canada)
"Gold"	John Stewart	May 1979	5	43	4 (Canada)	5 (Australia) - 6 (US Cash Box Top 100) - 13 (New Zealand) - 42 (US Billboard Adult Contemporary)
"Good Times"	Chic	June 1979	1	5	1 (Canada, United States)	See chart entry performance
"Goodbye Stranger"	Supertramp	March 1979	15	57	6 (Canada)	See chart entry performance
"Goodnight Tonight"	Wings	June 1979	5	5	1 (Canada)	See chart entry
"Half The Way"	Crystal Gayle	September 1979	15	n/a	1 (Canada)	2 (Canadian Adult Contemporary Tracks) - 2 (US Billboard Hot Country Songs) - 4 (South Africa) - 9 (US Billboard Adult Contemporary) - 56 (Canada)
"Halfway Hotel"	Voyager	April 1979	n/a	33	33 (United Kingdom)	15 (Australia)
"Hallelujah"	Milk and Honey, including Gali Atari	April 1979	n/a	5	1 (Finland, Ireland, Israel, Norway, Sweden)	See chart performance entry
"He's the Greatest Dancer"	Sister Sledge	February 1979	9	6	6 (Canada, United Kingdom)	See chart performance entry
"Heaven Knows"	Donna Summer w/Brooklyn Dreams	January 1979	4	34	3 (Canada)	See chart performance entry
"Highway to Hell"	AC/DC	July 1979	47	56	14 (Belgian)	See chart performance entry
"Honesty"	Billy Joel	May 1979	24	n/a	1 (France)	See chart performance entry
"I Have a Dream"	ABBA	December 1979	n/a	2	1 (Austria, Belgium, Netherlands [Dutch Top 40)/[Single Top 100), Switzerland)	2 (Ireland) - 3 (South Africa) - 64 (Australia)
"I Know a Heartache When I See One"	Jennifer Warnes	June 1979	19	n/a	19 (United States)	10 (U.S. Billboard Hot Country Songs) - 12 (Canada RPM Country) - 14 (U.S. Billboard Adult Contemporary) - 21 (U.S. Cash Box Top 100) - 46 (Canada RPM Top Singles)
"I Just Fall in Love Again"	Anne Murray	January 1979	12	58	1 (Canada)	1 (Canadian RPM Country Tracks, Canadian RPM Adult Contemporary, U.S. Billboard Hot Country Songs, U.S. Billboard Hot Adult Contemporary Tracks) - 46 (Australia)
"I Want You To Want Me (live)"	Cheap Trick	April 1979	7	29	1 (Belgium, Japan, Netherlands [Dutch Top 40])	2 (Canada) - 3 (U.S. Cash Box top 100) - 15 (Austria) - 18 (West Germany) - 23 (New Zealand)
"I Was Made For Lovin' You"	Kiss	May 1979	11	50	1 (Belgium, Canada, France, Netherlands [Dutch Top 40]/[Single Top 100], New Zealand)	See chart performance entry
"I Will Survive"	Gloria Gaynor	October 1979	1	1	1 (Ireland, United Kingdom, United States)	See chart performance entry
"If I Said You Had a Beautiful Body Would You Hold It Against Me"	The Bellamy Brothers	March 1979	39	3	3 (United Kingdom)	1 (U.S. Billboard Hot Country Songs) - 11 (Netherlands [Dutch Top 40]) - 17 (New Zealand) - 24 (Canadian RPM Country Tracks)
"(If Loving You Is Wrong) I Don't Want to Be Right"	Barbara Mandrell	February 1979	31	n/a	31 (United States)	1 (U.S. Billboard Hot Country Songs) - 6 (U.S. Billboard Adult Contemporary)
"In the Navy"	Village People	March 1979	3	n/a	1 (Belgium, Canada, Netherlands [Dutch Top 40]/[Single Top 100])	See chart performance entry
"Is She Really Going Out with Him?"	Joe Jackson	April 1979	21	13	8 (Ireland)	9 (Canada) - 15 (Australia) - 18 (New Zealand) - 46 (Netherlands [Single Top 100)]
"Lucky Number"	Lene Lovich	January 1979	n/a	3	2 (Australia)	See chart performance entry
"This Is It"	Kenny Loggins	October 1979	11	n/a	9 (Canada)	See chart performance entry
"Tusk"	Fleetwood Mac	September 1979	8	6	3 (Australia)	See chart performance entry
"Video Killed the Radio Star"	The Buggles	September 1979	40	1	1 (11 countries)	See chart performance entry
"We Don't Talk Anymore"	Cliff Richard	July 1979	7	1	1 (11 countries)	See chart performance entry
"Weekend"	Earth and Fire	November 1979	n/a	n/a	1 (7 countries)	See chart performance entry
"Who Listens to the Radio"	The Sports	November 1979	45	n/a	35 (Australia)	An original 45 version charted in Australia in November 1978. The Album version charted in the US a year later
"You Decorated My Life"	Kenny Rogers	September 1979	7	n/a	7 (United Kingdom)	See chart performance entry
"You're Only Lonely"	JD Souther	September 1979	7	n/a	7 (United States)	1 (U.S. Billboard Adult Contemporary) - 2 (Canadian RPM Adult Contemporary) - 12 (Canadian RPM Country Tracks) - 17 (Australia) - 18 (Canadian RPM Top Singles) - 60 (U.S. Billboard Hot Country Singles)
"You've Lost That Loving Feeling"	Long John Baldry and Kathi McDonald	June 1979	89	n/a	2 (Australia)	37 (New Zealand) - 45 (Canada)

== Number One hit singles ==
Song title	Artist(s)	Release date(s)	Date reached number one	Weeks at number one	Country(s)
"(You Gotta Walk And) Don't Look Back"	Peter Tosh & Mick Jagger	October 1978	January 1979	2 weeks	The Netherlands
"Another Brick in the Wall (Part 2)"	Pink Floyd	November 1979	December 1979	5 weeks	15 countries
"Are 'Friends' Electric?"	Tubeway Army	May 1979	June 1979	4 weeks	United Kingdom
"Babe"	Styx	September 1979	December 1979	2 weeks	Canada, South Africa, United States
"Baby It's You"	Promises	February 1979	April 1979	1 week	New Zealand
"Bad Girls"	Donna Summer	May 1979	July 1979	5 weeks	Canada, United States
"Born to Be Alive"	Patrick Hernandez	November 1978	April 1979	4 weeks	15 countries
"Bright Eyes"	Art Garfunkel	January 1979	April 1979	6 weeks	Belgium, The Netherlands, United Kingdom
"C'mon Aussie C'mon"	The Mojo Singers	December 1978	February 1979	2 weeks	Australia
"Ça plane pour moi"	Plastic Bertrand	December 1977	February 1979	1 week	France, Switzerland
"Chiquitita"	ABBA	January 1979	February 1979	4 weeks	10 countries
"Computer Games"	Mi-Sex	October 1979	November 1979	1 week	Australia
"Da Ya Think I'm Sexy?"	Rod Stewart	November 1978	February 1979	4 weeks	6 countries
"Darlin'"	Frankie Miller	October 1978	January 1979	1 week	Norway
" Do You Want Your Old Lobby Washed Down, Con Shine"	Brendan Shine	April 1979	June 1979	6 weeks	Ireland
"Don't Stop 'Til You Get Enough"	Michael Jackson	July 1979	October 1979	6 weeks	6 countries
"Dschinghis Khan"	Dschinghis Khan	March 1979	June 1979	4 weeks	West Germany
"Escape (The Piña Colada Song)"	Rupert Holmes	September 1979	December 1979	3 weeks	Canada, United States
"Fire"	Pointer Sisters	October 1978	February 1979	2 weeks	5 countries
"Gimme! Gimme! Gimme! (A Man After Midnight)"	ABBA	October 1979	October 1979	1 week	7 countries
"Good Times"	Chic	July 1979	August 1979	1 week	United States
"Gotta Go Home" / "El Lute"	Boney M.	July 1979	August 1979	8 weeks	Europe, West Germany
"Green Fields Of France"	The Fureys and Davey Arthur	March 1979	June 1979	1 weeks	Ireland
"Hallelujah"	Milk and Honey	April 1979	May 1979	1 week	5 countries
"Heart of Glass"	Blondie	January 1979	February 1979	4 weeks	8 countries
"Heartache Tonight"	Eagles	October 1979	November 1979	1 week	Canada, United States
"Hit Me with Your Rhythm Stick"	Ian Dury and the Blockheads	November 1978	January 1979	1 week	United Kingdom
"Hot Stuff"	Donna Summer	April 1979	June 1979	3 weeks	6 countries
"I Don't Like Mondays"	The Boomtown Rats	July 1979	July 1979	4 weeks	4 countries
"I Was Made for Lovin' You"	KISS	May 1979	June 1979	4 weeks	5 countries
"I Will Survive"	Gloria Gaynor	October 1978	March 1979	3 weeks	Ireland, United Kingdom, United States
"In the Navy"	Village People	March 1979	April 1979	6 weeks	Belgium, Canada, The Netherlands
"Jezebel"	Jon Stevens	October 1979	November 1979	5 weeks	New Zealand
"Knock on Wood"	Amii Stewart	January 1979	April 1979	1 week	Canada, Italy, United States
"Lay Your Love on Me"	Racey	November 1978	March 1979	2 weeks	Australia, The Netherlands, New Zealand
"Le Freak"	Chic	September 1978	January 1979	6 weeks	5 countries
"Love You Inside Out"	Bee Gees	April 1979	June 1979	1 week	Canada, United States
"MacArthur Park"	Donna Summer	September 1978	January 1979	1 week	Canada, United States
"Mary's Boy Child – Oh My Lord"	Boney M.	November 1978	January 1979	3 weeks	5 countries
"Message in a Bottle"	The Police	September 1979	September 1979	3 weeks	Ireland, Spain, United Kingdom
"Michael Row the Boat Ashore"	Richard Jon Smith	April 1979	June 1979	2 weeks	South Africa
"Moskau"	Dschinghis Khan	May 1979	August 1979	6 week	Australia; September 1980 in Australia
"My Sharona"	The Knack	June 1979	August 1979	6 weeks	4 countries
"No More Tears (Enough Is Enough)"	Barbra Streisand and Donna Summer	October 1979	November 1979	2 weeks	Sweden, United States
"One Day at a Time"	Lena Martell	September 1979	October 1979	3 weeks	United Kingdom
"Paradise by the Dashboard Light"	Meat Loaf	August 1977	January 1979	3 weeks	The Netherlands
"Please Don't Go"	KC & The Sunshine Band	July 1979	December 1979	1 week	4 countries
"Pop Muzik"	M	March 1979	May 1979	3 weeks	9 countries
"Reunited"	Peaches & Herb	March 1979	May 1979	4 weeks	Canada, Spain, United States
"Ring My Bell"	Anita Ward	May 1979	June 1979	2 weeks	6 countries
"Rise"	Herb Alpert	July 1979	October 1979	2 weeks	United States
"Rock with You"	Michael Jackson	November 1979	December 1979	1 week	United States
"Sad Eyes"	Robert John	April 1979	October 1979	1 week	United States
"Six Ribbons"	Jon English and Mario Millo	November 1978	January 1979	2 weeks	Norway
"So bist du"	Peter Maffay	August 1979	October 1979	3 weeks	West Germany
"Some Girls"	Racey	March 1979	May 1979	2 weeks	Australia, New Zealand
"Still"	Commodores	September 1979	November 1979	1 week	United States
"Sunday Girl"	Blondie	May 1979	May 1979	3 weeks	Ireland, United Kingdom
"The Logical Song"	Supertramp	March 1979	June 1979	2 weeks	Canada
"Three Times a Lady"	Commodores	June 1978	January 1979	3 weeks	5 countries
"Too Much Heaven"	Bee Gees	November 1978	January 1979	2 weeks	12 countries
"Tragedy"	Bee Gees	February 1979	March 1979	2 weeks	9 countries

=== Other Chart hit singles ===
- "Banana Splits (Tra La La Song)" – The Dickies (# 7 UK)
- "Bat Out of Hell" – Meat Loaf (# 8 UK)
- "Beautiful People" – Australian Crawl (# 22 Australia)
- "Bright Side of the Road" – Van Morrison (# 63 UK, # 48 Netherlands)
- "C'mon Aussie C'mon" – The Mojo Singers (# 1 Australia - originally released in 1978)
- "Choirgirl" – Cold Chisel (# 14 Australia)
- "Dancing Barefoot" – Patti Smith Group (# 39 Netherlands)
- "Death Disco" – Public Image Ltd. (# 20 United Kingdom)
- "D.I.S.C.O." – Ottawan (# 1 Netherlands, # 2 United Kingdom)
- "The Eton Rifles" – The Jam (# 3 United Kingdom, # 50 Australia)
- "Freedom's Prisoner" – Steve Harley (# 58 UK)
- "Good Times Roll" - The Cars (# 41 United States, # 60 US Cash Box Top 100 Singles, # 74 Canada)
- "Here Comes the Summer" – The Undertones (# 34 UK)
- "Hersham Boys" – Sham 69 (# 6 UK)
- "Hit and Run" – Jo Jo Zep & The Falcons (# 12 Australia)
- "I'm Not Like Everybody Else" - Jimmy and the Boys (# 57 Australia)
- "I Do Love You" – GQ (# 20 US, # 5 US R&B charts)
- "I Just Can't Be Happy Today" – The Damned (# 46 UK)
- "I Wanna Be Sedated" – Ramones
- "Into the Valley" – The Skids (# 10 UK)
- "Jezebel – Jon Stevens (# 1 New Zealand)
- "Jimmy Jimmy" – The Undertones (# 16 UK)
- "Just the Way You Are" – Barry White
- "Just What I Needed" – The Cars
- "Just When I Needed You Most" – Randy VanWarmer
- "Lay Your Love on Me" – Racey
- "Lead Me On" – Maxine Nightingale
- "Let's Go" – The Cars
- "Life During Wartime" – Talking Heads
- "Little Bit of Soap" – Nigel Olsson
- "The Logical Song" – Supertramp
- "London Calling" – The Clash
- "Lonesome Loser" – Little River Band
- "The Long Run" – Eagles
- "Lotta Love" – Nicolette Larson
- "Love Song" – The Damned
- "Lucky Number" – Lene Lovich
- "The Main Event/Fight" – Barbra Streisand
- "Make My Dreams a Reality" – GQ
- "Making Plans for Nigel" – XTC
- "Mama Can't Buy You Love" – Elton John
- "A Message to You, Rudy/Nite Klub" – The Specials
- "Message in a Bottle" – The Police
- "Milk and Alcohol" – Dr. Feelgood
- "Morning Dance" – Spyro Gyra
- "Moskau" – Dschinghis Khan
- "Music Box Dancer" – Frank Mills
- "My Forbidden Lover" – Chic
- "My Girl" – Madness
- "My Life" – Billy Joel
- "Nami Nori Pirates" – Pink Lady (band)
- "Old Time Rock and Roll" – Bob Seger
- "Oliver's Army" – Elvis Costello and the Attractions
- "On My Radio" – The Selecter
- "One Step Beyond" – Madness
- "One Way or Another" – Blondie
- "One Way Ticket" – Eruption
- "Ooh Baby Baby" – Linda Ronstadt
- "Ooh, Yes I Do" – Luv'
- "Parisienne Walkways" – Gary Moore
- "Playground Twist" – Siouxsie and the Banshees
- "Please Don't Go" – KC & The Sunshine Band
- "The Prince" – Madness
- "Queen of Hearts" – Dave Edmunds
- "Questions and Answers" – Sham 69
- "Rapper's Delight" – The Sugarhill Gang (#36 US: first rap song to hit Billboard's Top 40)
- "Reasons to Be Cheerful (Part 3)" – Ian Dury & the Blockheads
- "Refugee" – Tom Petty & the Heartbreakers
- "Rock with You" – Michael Jackson
- "Rodrigo's Guitar Concerto" – The Shadows
- "Roxanne" – The Police (released in 1978)
- "Run Like Hell" – Pink Floyd
- "Sad Eyes" – Robert John
- "Sail On" – Commodores
- "Shadows in the Moonlight" – Anne Murray
- "Shake Your Body (Down to the Ground)" – The Jacksons
- "Shape I'm In" – Jo Jo Zep & The Falcons
- "She Believes In Me" – Kenny Rogers
- "Shine a Little Love" – Electric Light Orchestra
- "Ships" – Barry Manilow
- "Shivers" - The Boys Next Door
- "Since You Been Gone" – Rainbow
- "Slap and Tickle" – Squeeze
- "Smash It Up" – The Damned
- "Some Girls" – Racey
- "Somethin' Else"/"Friggin' in the Riggin'" – Sex Pistols
- "Somewhere in the Night" – Barry Manilow
- "Song on the Radio" – Al Stewart
- "Spiral Scratch" – Buzzcocks
- "The Staircase (Mystery)" – Siouxsie and the Banshees
- "Strange Town" – The Jam
- "Street Life" – The Crusaders w/Randy Crawford
- "Stumblin' In" – Suzi Quatro & Chris Norman
- "Sultans of Swing" – Dire Straits (released in 1978)
- "Take Me Home – Cher
- "Take On The World" – Judas Priest
- "Take The Long Way Home – Supertramp
- "Talking In Your Sleep" – Crystal Gayle
- "Tears of a Clown"/"Ranking Full Stop" – The Beat
- "Theme from the Deerhunter (Cavatina)" – The Shadows
- "Transmission" – Joy Division
- "Union City Blue" – Blondie
- "Up the Junction" – Squeeze
- "Up There Cazaly" – The Two Man Band
- "Video Killed The Radio Star" – The Buggles
- "Voulez-Vous" – ABBA
- "Waiting for an Alibi" – Thin Lizzy
- "We Are Family" – Sister Sledge
- "We Don't Talk Anymore" – Cliff Richard
- "What I Like About You" - The Romantics (Began charting in 1980)
- "Whatever You Want" – Status Quo
- "When I Think of You" – Leif Garrett
- "When You're Young" – The Jam
- "Who Listens to the Radio" (Album version) - The Sports (# 35 Australia- original 45) - (# 45 United States - Album version)
- "Wonderful Christmastime" – Paul McCartney
- "Y.M.C.A" – Village People
- "You Decorated My Life" – Kenny Rogers
- "You Needed Me" – Anne Murray (in the UK; hit #1 in the US in 1978)
- "You Take My Breath Away" – Rex Smith
- "You're a Better Man Than I" – Sham 69
- "You've Got My Number (Why Don't You Use It?)" – The Undertones

== Notable singles ==
Song title	Artist(s)	Release date(s)	Other Chart Performance(s)
"Bela Lugosi's Dead"	Bauhaus	August 1979	n/a
"Boys Don't Cry"	The Cure	July 1979	99 (Australia)
"California über alles"	Dead Kennedys	June 1979	4 (UK Indie Chart)
"Death Disco"	Public Image Ltd	June 1979	20 (UK Singles Chart)
"Jumping Someone Else's Train"	The Cure	November 1979	n/a
"Life During Wartime"	Talking Heads	September 1979	80 (US Billboard Hot 100)
"Mania de você"	Rita Lee	August 1979	n/a
"Mittageisen"	Siouxsie and the Banshees	September 1979	47 (UK Singles Chart)
"Playground Twist"	Siouxsie and the Banshees	June 1979	28 (UK Singles Chart)
"Rapper's Delight"	The Sugarhill Gang	September 1979	(#36 US: first rap song to hit Billboard's Top 40)
"Shivers"	The Boys Next Door	May 1979	n/a
"The Staircase (Mystery)"	Siouxsie and the Banshees	March 1979	24 (UK Singles Chart)
"They Don't Know"	Kirsty MacColl	June 1979	n/a
"Transmission"	Joy Division	October 1979	n/a
"Typical Girls" / "I Heard It Through the Grapevine"	The Slits	September 1979	60 (UK singles Chart)

=== Other notable singles ===
- "Baby Doll" - Teenage Jesus and the Jerks
- "Fa Cé La" - The Feelies
- "Gidget Goes to Hell" - Suburban Lawns
- "Orphans" - Teenage Jesus and the Jerks
- "Rowche Rumble" - The Fall
- "Run by Night" - Midnight Oil

== Published popular music ==
- "Don't Cry Out Loud" w. Carole Bayer Sager m. Peter Allen
- "The Facts of Life" w.m. Alan Thicke, Gloria Loring, and Al Burton, from the TV series of the same name
- "I'd Rather Leave While I'm In Love" w.m. Carole Bayer Sager & Peter Allen
- "Knots Landing theme" m. Jerrold Immel
- "The Rainbow Connection" w.m. Kenny Ascher & Paul Williams, from the film The Muppet Movie
- "Sultans of Swing" w.m. Mark Knopfler

== Classical music ==
- Arno Babadjanian – Third String Quartet
- Milton Babbitt
  - An Elizabethan Sextette, for six female voices
  - Images, for saxophone and tape
  - Paraphrases, for ten instruments
- Osvaldas Balakauskas – Symphony No. 2
- Pascal Bentoiu – Symphony No. 5, Op. 26
- Luciano Berio – Scena
- Harrison Birtwistle – ... agm ..., for sixteen voices and three instrumental ensembles
- John Cage
  - Hymns and Variations, for twelve amplified voices
  - Roaratorio for tape
- George Crumb
  - Apparition for soprano and amplified piano
  - Celestial Mechanics (Makrokosmos IV) for amplified piano (four hands)
  - Star-Child (1977, revised 1979) for soprano, antiphonal children's voices, male speaking choir, bell ringers, and large orchestra
- Mario Davidovsky – Pennplay for sixteen players
- Peter Maxwell Davies
  - Black Pentecost, for mezzo-soprano, baritone, and orchestra, Op. 82
  - Kirkwall Shopping Songs, for young voices and instruments, Op. 85
  - Nocturne, for alto flute solo, Op. 84
  - Quiet Memory of Bob Jennings, for violin, viola, and cello, WoO 135
  - Salome, concert suite from the ballet, Op. 80b
  - Solstice of Light, cantata for tenor, SATB chorus, and organ, Op. 83
- Morton Feldman
  - String Quartet No. 1
  - Violin and Orchestra
- Hugh Flynn – Birds
- Philip Glass
  - Dance (Dances 1, 3 and 5, with Lucinda Childs and Sol LeWitt), for ensemble
  - Mad Rush, for piano or electric organ
- Alexander Goehr
  - Babylon the Great Is Fallen, cantata, Op. 40
  - Chaconne for organ, Op. 34a
  - Das Gesetz der Quadrille, Op. 41
  - Sinfonia, Op. 42
- Cristóbal Halffter
  - Officium defunctuorum, for orchestra and chorus
  - Violin Concerto No. 1
- Jacques Hétu – Bassoon Concerto
- Vagn Holmboe
  - Violin Concerto No. 2
  - Notater for 3 trombones (alto, tenor, baritone) and tuba
  - Konstateringer for choir
  - Guitar Sonata No. 1
  - Guitar Sonata No. 2
  - Accordion Sonata No. 1
  - Bogtrykkemaskinen for violin and piano
- Miloslav Kabelac – Metamorphoses II, for piano and orchestra, Op. 58
- Wojciech Kilar –
  - Fanfare for mixed choir and orchestra
  - Hoary Fog (Siwa mgła), for baritone and orchestra
- Witold Lutosławski – Novelette for orchestra
- William Lloyd Webber – Missa Sanctae Mariae Magdalenae
- Tomás Marco
  - Aria de la batalla, for organ
  - Tartessos, for four percussionists
- Richard Meale – Viridian, for orchestra
- Paul Moravec
  - Ave Verum Corpus, for SATB chorus
  - Missa Miserere, for SATB chorus and orchestra
  - Pater Noster, for SATB chorus
- Ștefan Niculescu – Sincronie for flute, oboe and bassoon
- Allan Pettersson – Viola Concerto
- Steve Reich
  - Octet
  - Variations for Winds, Strings and Keyboards
- R. Murray Schafer
  - Beauty and the Beast, from Patria 3, for alto with masks and string quartet
  - Felix's Girls, from Patria 3, for SATB quartet or choir
  - Gamelan, from Patria 3, for SATB, SASA, or TBTB solo quartet or choir
  - Hear Me Out from Patria 3, for four speaking voices
  - Music for Wilderness Lake, for twelve trombones and small rural lake
  - Ontario Variations on a theme by Jack Behrens (one variation), for piano, contribution to collective work by Ontario composers
- Peter Sculthorpe
  - Four Little Pieces, for piano duet
  - Mangrove, for orchestra
  - Requiem, for cello alone
- Denis Smalley – The Pulses of Time, electronic music
- Roger Smalley – String Quartet
- Michael Tippett – Triple Concerto for violin, viola, and cello
- Anatol Vieru
  - Concerto for violin, cello, and orchestra
  - Iosif si fratii sai, for eleven instruments and tape
- Malcolm Williamson – Fanfarade, for orchestra
- Charles Wuorinen
  - Fortune, for clarinet, violin, cello, and piano
  - Joan's, for flute, clarinet, violin, cello, and piano
  - The Magic Art, instrumental masque, for chamber orchestra
  - Percussion Duo, for mallet instruments and piano
  - Psalm 39, for baritone and guitar
  - String Quartet No. 2
  - Three Songs, for tenor and piano
- Iannis Xenakis
  - Anémoessa, for SATB chorus of 42 or 84 voices and orchestra
  - Dikhthas, for violin and piano
  - Palimpsest, for cor anglais, bass clarinet, bassoon, horn, percussion, piano, and string quintet

== Opera ==
- Peter Maxwell Davies
  - Cinderella, Op. 87
  - The Lighthouse, Op. 86
- Hossein Dehlavi – Mana and Mani
- Libby Larsen – The Silver Fox
- Roger Smalley – William Derrincourt (Perth, 31 August)

== Musical theatre ==
- Ain't Misbehavin' (Music: Fats Waller, Lyrics: Various Book: Murray Horwitz & Richard Maltby, Jr.). London production opened at Her Majesty's Theatre on March 22.
- Carmelina (Book: Alan Jay Lerner & Joseph Stein Lyrics: Alan Jay Lerner Music: Burton Lane) Broadway production opened at the St. James Theatre on April 8 and ran for 17 performances. Starring Georgia Brown and Cesare Siepi
- Evita (Music: Andrew Lloyd Webber, Lyrics and Book: Tim Rice). Broadway production opened at the Broadway Theatre on September 25 and ran for 1567 performances
- The King and I London revival opened at the Palladium on June 12 and ran for 538 performances
- My Old Friends (Music, Lyrics and Book: Mel Mandel and Norman Sachs). Off-Broadway production opened at the Orpheum Theatre on January 12 and transferred to the 22 Steps Theatre on Broadway on April 12 for a total run of 154 performances.
- Oklahoma! (Music: Richard Rodgers, Lyrics and Book: Oscar Hammerstein II) – Broadway revival opened at the Palace Theatre on December 13 and ran for 310 performances
- Peter Pan (Music: Mark Charlap, Lyrics and Book: Carolyn Leigh with additional songs, Music: Jule Styne and Lyrics: Betty Comden & Adolph Green). Broadway revival opened at the Lunt-Fontanne Theatre on September 6 and ran for 551 performances.
- Saravá (Music: Mitch Leigh, Lyrics and Book: N. Richard Nash). Broadway production opened at the Mark Hellinger Theatre on February 23 and ran for 140 performances
- Sugar Babies Broadway revue opened at the Mark Hellinger Theatre on October 8 and ran for 1208 performances.
- Sweeney Todd (Music and Lyrics: Stephen Sondheim, Book: Hugh Wheeler) – Broadway production opened at the Uris Theatre on March 1 and ran for 557 performances
- They're Playing Our Song (Music: Marvin Hamlisch, Lyrics: Carole Bayer Sager, Book: Neil Simon). Broadway production opened at the Imperial Theatre on February 11 and ran for 1082 performances
- Tommy London production opened at Queen's Theatre on February 6 and ran for 118 performances
- The Venetian Twins (Music: Terence Clarke, Lyrics and Book: Nick Enright). Opened at the Sydney Opera House Drama Theatre on October 26.
- Whoopee (Music: Walter Donaldson, Lyrics: Gus Kahn, Book: William Anthony McGuire). Broadway revival opened at the ANTA Theatre on February 14 and ran for 212 performances.

== Musical films ==
- All That Jazz
- Balada pro banditu
- Hair
- Metamorphoses
- The Muppet Movie
- The Music Machine
- Ochen sinjaja boroda (animation)
- Oolkatal
- Radio On
- Rock 'n' Roll High School
- Roller Boogie
- The Rose
- Schlager
- Skatetown, U.S.A.

== Births ==
- January 1
  - Brody Dalle, Australian singer-songwriter and guitarist
  - Koichi Domoto, Japanese singer-songwriter and actor
- January 3 – Koit Toome, Estonian actor and singer
- January 5 – Kathleen Edwards, Canadian singer/musician
- January 7 – Aloe Blacc, American musician, singer, songwriter, record producer, actor, businessman, and philanthropist
- January 8 – David Civera, Spanish singer
- January 10 – Christopher Smith, singer-songwriter (Kris Kross)
- January 11 – Siti Nurhaliza, Malaysian singer
- January 15 – Young Dro, American rapper
- January 16 – Aaliyah Haughton, American singer, actress, and model (d. 2001)
- January 20
  - Rob Bourdon (Linkin Park)
  - Will Young, British singer
  - Joel Pott, English musician, producer and songwriter (Shura, George Ezra)
- January 24 – Tatyana Ali, American actress and singer
- January 30 – Nam Hyun-joon, South Korean dancer, rapper and singer
- January 31 – Kim E-Z, South Korean singer (Baby Vox)
- February 1
  - Valentín Elizalde, Regional Mexican singer
  - Jason Isbell, American singer-songwriter and guitarist (Drive-By Truckers)
  - Julie Roberts, American country singer-songwriter
  - February 5 – Nima Varasteh, Iranian musician
- February 6 – Dan Balan, Moldovan singer (O-Zone)
- February 7 – Karin Hills, Brazilian actress, singer and songwriter (Rouge)
- February 10
  - Daryl Palumbo, American musician who fronted bands such as Glassjaw
  - Don Omar, Puerto Rican rapper, singer, songwriter, record producer and actor
- February 11 – Brandy Norwood, American singer, songwriter, record producer, and actress
- February 12 – Jade Jones, British singer and chef, Emma Bunton's partner
- February 14 – Tsakane Valentine Maswanganyi, South African operatic and concert soprano
- February 15
  - Adam Granduciel, American musician
  - Fantine Thó, Brazilian and Dutch singer (Rouge)
- February 16 – Eric Mun, South Korean rapper (Shinhwa)
- February 17 – Matt Wertz, American singer-songwriter
- February 21 – Jennifer Love Hewitt, American actress, television producer, director, singer-songwriter, and author\
- February 22 – Jessica Kiper (a.k.a. "Sugar"), American actress, singer, reality TV star and actress
- February 26 – Corinne Bailey Rae, British singer, songwriter, record producer, and guitarist
- March 4
  - Merrill Garbus, multi-instrumentalist, singer-songwriter, activist, art-pop musician (Tune-Yards)
  - Jon Fratelli, Scottish singer-songwriter, lead vocalist and guitarist (The Fratellis)
- March 7 – Amanda Somerville, American singer-songwriter and vocal coach
- March 8 – Tom Chaplin, British singer (Keane)
- March 8 – Zena McNally, English former presenter and singer (Mis-Teeq)
- March 9 – Oscar Isaac, Guatemalan-American actor and musician (Sucker Punch, The Blinking Underdogs, Inside Llewyn Davis)
- March 11
  - Benji Madden, American lead guitar for Good Charlotte
  - Joel Madden, American lead vocals for Good Charlotte
- March 14 – Jacques Brautbar (Phantom Planet)
- March 18 – Adam Levine, American singer, songwriter, multi-instrumentalist, actor, and record producer (Maroon 5)
- March 20 – Sean Garrett, American musical producer, musician, songwriter (Britney Spears, Beyoncé, Ciara)
- March 23 – Ariel Rechtshaid, American record producer, audio engineer, mixing engineer, multi-instrumentalist, and songwriter
- March 27 – Lee Ji-hoon, South Korean singer (S)
- March 28 – Shakib Khan, Bangladeshi film actor, producer, singer, film organiser, and media personality
- March 30 – Norah Jones, American singer-songwriter, pianist
- April 1 – Mikko Franck, Finnish violinist and conductor
- April 2 – Jesse Carmichael, American instrumentalist
- April 3 – DJ Encore, Danish songwriter and producer
- April 6
  - Richard Jones, British music producer, songwriter, bass guitar player and founding member of the rock band The Feeling
  - H-Eugene, South Korean rapper and singer
- April 7 – Nicole Fiorentino, American bass guitarist (Veruca Salt, The Smashing Pumpkins)
- April 8 – Alexi Laiho, Finnish guitarist, composer, and vocalist (d. 2020)
- April 10
  - Sophie Ellis-Bextor, British singer-songwriter and dancer
  - Jessie Farrell, Canadian country music singer
- April 11
  - Danielle de Niese, Australian-American lyric soprano
  - Chris Gaylor, drummer (The All-American Rejects)
  - Sebastien Grainger (Death from Above 1979)
- April 13 – Tony Lundon (Liberty X)
- April 19 – Kate Hudson, American actress and singer
- April 20 – Quinn Weng, Taiwanese-Canadian mezzo-soprano singer (Seraphim)
- April 21 – Anwar Robinson, American singer
- April 22 – Daniel Johns, Australian musician, singer, and songwriter (Silverchair)
- April 28 – Sofia Vitória, Portuguese singer
- April 29
  - Jo O'Meara, English singer and actress (S Club 7)
  - Matt Tong, drummer (Bloc Party)
- May 3
  - Danny Foster, English group (Hear'Say)
  - Lexy, South Korean singer and rapper
  - Hell Rell, American rapper (The Diplomats)
- May 4 – Lance Bass, American singer, dancer, actor, film, and television producer, and author ('N Sync)
- May 9
  - Ara Mina, Filipino actress and singer
  - Andrew W.K., American singer-songwriter, multi-instrumentalist, and music producer
  - Pierre Bouvier, Canadian singer and musician best known for being the lead vocalist and studio bassist of the rock band Simple Plan.
  - Matt Morris, American singer, producer, actor, and songwriter
- May 10 – Lee Hyori, South Korean singer (Fin.K.L)
- May 12 – Aaron Yoo, American actor
- May 13 – Mickey Madden, American bassist
- May 14 – Dan Auerbach, American musician, singer-songwriter, and record producer (The Black Keys, Patrick Carney)
- May 16 – Lee Hee-jin, South Korean singer (Baby Vox)
- May 17 – Ayda Field, American actress (Married to Robbie Williams, Worked with Gary Barlow)
- May 19 – Shooter Jennings, American singer-songwriter and musician
- May 23 – Brian Campbell, Canadian ice hockey
- May 29 – Scribe, New Zealand hip-hop rapper and recording artist of Samoan descent
- June 5 – Pete Wentz, American musician, multi-instrumentalist, writer, mental health advocate, and songwriter (Fall Out Boy)
- June 7 – Julie Berthelsen, Danish pop singer
- June 8 – Derek Trucks, guitarist, songwriter
- June 12 – Robyn, Swedish singer, songwriter, and record producer
- June 17 – Young Maylay, American rapper, producer, and voice actor
- June 18 – Ivana Wong, Hong Kong singer-songwriter and actress
- June 19 – Robby De Sá, South African musician, music producer, and instrumentalist
- June 20 – Charlotte Hatherley, Irish singer, guitarist, and songwriter (Ash)
- June 26 – Ryan Tedder, American singer, songwriter, multi-instrumentalist, and record producer (OneRepublic, Hilary Duff, Taylor Swift, Selena Gomez, Jennifer Lopez)
- June 28 – Tim McCord, American bassist (Evanescence)
- June 29 – Abz Love, singer (5ive)
- July 4 – Dumas, Canadian singer-songwriter and guitarist
- July 5 – Shane Filan, Irish singer and songwriter (Westlife)
- July 6 – Matthew Barnson, American viola player and composer
- July 9 – Ella Koon, Hong Kong singer and actress
- July 13
  - Ladyhawke, New Zealand born singer, songwriter, and multi-instrumentalist
  - Lee Jai-jin, South Korean singer (Sechs Kies)
- July 15 – Laura Benanti, American actress and singer
- July 16 – Ivan Tásler
- July 17 – Solé, American rapper
- July 19 – Michelle Heaton, English singer (Liberty X)
- July 23 – Michelle Williams, American singer and actress (Destiny's Child)
- July 25 – Amy Adams, singer
- July 26 – Tamyra Gray, singer
- July 28
  - Lee Min-woo, South Korean singer (Shinhwa)
  - Birgitta Haukdal, Icelandic singer
- August 7
  - Gangsta Boo, American rapper (d. 2023)
  - Kim Jae-duck, South Korean singer (Sechs Kies)
  - Dominique Fidanza, Belgian-Italian singer (Lollipop)
- August 12 – Cheri Dennis, American R&B singer
- August 13 – Amiel Daemion, American-Australian pop singer, songwriter, and actress
- August 15 – Jon Hopkins, an English musician and producer who writes and performs electronic music. H
- August 16 – Brian Ormond, Irish singer
- August 20 – Jamie Cullum, English jazz-pop singer-songwriter, pianist
- August 21 – Kelis, American singer-songwriter and chef
- August 23 – Ritchie Neville, singer (5ive)
- August 27 – Jon Siebels, guitarist (Eve 6)
- August 31 – Yuvan Shankar Raja, film composer and singer
- September 3 – Jason McCaslin, bass guitarist (Sum 41)
- September 4 – MC Mong, South Korean rapper
- September 6 – Mike Arnaoutis, Greek boxer
- September 8 – Slim Thug, American rapper
- September 8 – Pink, American singer-songwriter, dancer, musician, and activist
- September 10 – MayBee, South Korean singer
- September 16
  - Flo Rida, American rapper and singer
  - Fanny, French singer
- September 17 – Chuck Comeau, Canadian musician (Simple Plan)
- September 18 – Clinton Sparks, American DJ and record producer
- September 21
  - Maija Kovaļevska, Latvian soprano opera singer
  - Jericho Rosales, Filipino entertainer
- September 22 – Emilie Autumn, American violinist, singer, poet, mental health advocate, and songwriter
- September 24 – Julia Clarete, Filipina singer, actress, performer, television personality, and former host of Eat Bulaga!
- September 24 – Kim Jong-min, South Korean singer, dancer, and television personality (Koyote)
- September 27
  - Barbara Kanam, Congolese singer
  - Nathan Foley, Australian singer-songwriter and television personality (Hi-5)
- September 30 – Indira Weis, German actress and singer (Bro'Sis)
- October 3 – Josh Klinghoffer, guitarist, (Red Hot Chili Peppers)
- October 9 – Alex Greenwald, vocals, rhythm guitar for Phantom Planet
- October 10 – Mýa, American recording artist, songwriter, and actress
- October 10 – Kangta, South Korean singer (H.O.T.)
- October 11 – Gabe Saporta, American musician (Midtown)
- October 12 – Jordan Pundik, lead vocals for New Found Glory
- October 13 – Ryan Malcolm, Canadian singer
- October 15
  - Jaci Velasquez, Latin pop singer
  - Yoav, singer-songwriter of Israeli-Romanian descent, raised in South Africa
- October 18 – Ne-Yo, American singer, songwriter, record producer, dancer, television host/judge, and actor (Jennifer Lopez, Rihanna, World Of Dance)
- October 23 – Vanessa Petruo, German singer, songwriter and actress (No Angels)
- October 24 – Ben Gillies, Australian drummer (Silverchair)
- October 25 – Bat for Lashes, English singer, songwriter, and multi-instrumentalist
- November 2 – Skull, South Korean reggae singer
- November 7 – Jon Peter Lewis, American singer
- November 9 – Nicolas Koeckert, German violinist
- November 10 – Chris Joannou, Australian musician, bass guitar for Silverchair
- November 21 – Kim Dong-wan, South Korean singer (Shinhwa)
- November 22 – Scott Robinson, singer (5ive)
- November 27
  - Hilary Hahn, American violinist
  - Shin Hye-sung, South Korean singer and songwriter
- November 28 – Chamillionaire, American rapper
- November 28 – Daniel Henney, American actor
- November 28 – Dane Bowers, English singer and songwriter (Another Level)
- November 29 – The Game, American rapper
- November 30
  - Smitty, American rapper, songwriter and entertainer
  - Dale Stewart, South African bass guitarist (Seether)
- December 3 – Daniel Bedingfield, English-New Zealand singer, songwriter, and record producer
- December 5 – RyanDan, Canadian musical duo (B4-4)
- December 7 – Sara Bareilles, American singer-songwriter, actress, and author.
- December 13 – Matthew Stiff, English opera singer (G4)
- December 14 – Sophie Monk, Australian singer, songwriter, actress, model, and radio personality
- December 15
  - Alex Solowitz, American actor, composer, singer, dancer, and producer (2gether)
  - Adam Brody, American actor, writer, musician, and producer (Leighton Meester, Big Japan)
  - Edele Lynch, Irish singer (B*Witched)
  - Keavy Lynch, Irish singer (B*Witched)
- December 17 – 40 Cal., American rapper (The Diplomats)
- December 18 – Murphy Lee, American rapper
- December 26 – Chris Daughtry, American singer, songwriter, musician, and actor
- December 28
  - Zach Hill, American multi-instrumentalist and visual artist, (Death Grips, The I.L.Y's, Hella)
  - Senna Gammour, German singer (Monrose)
- December 30 – Yelawolf, American rapper, singer-songwriter, musician, and producer
- December 31 – Bob Bryar, American retired musician, drummer (My Chemical Romance)
- Unknown
  - Ingrid Michaelson, American singer-songwriter, actress, and activist
  - Ms. Jade, American rapper

== Deaths ==
- January 5 – Charles Mingus, jazz musician, 56
- January 13
  - Donny Hathaway, singer, 33 (injuries from fall)
  - Marjorie Lawrence, operatic soprano, 71
- January 31 – Olga Olgina, Polish opera singer and teacher, 74.
- February 2 – Sid Vicious, punk rocker, 21
- March 4 – Mike Patto, rock singer, 36 (cancer)
- March 5 – Alan Crofoot, operatic tenor and host of Mr Piper, 49 (suicide)
- March 13 – Harrison Keller, US violinist and music teacher, 90
- March 22 – Walter Legge, record producer, 72
- March 23 – Antonio Brosa, violinist, 84
- April 3 – Ernst Glaser, Norwegian violinist, conductor and music teacher, 75
- April 10 – Nino Rota, composer, 67 (coronary thrombosis)
- April 16 – Maria Caniglia, operatic soprano, 73
- April 29 – Julia Perry, composer and conductor, 55
- May 1 – Bronislav Gimpel, violinist, 68
- May 9 – Zoltán Kelemen, operatic bass-baritone, 53
- May 11 – Lester Flatt, bluegrass musician, 64
- May 21 – Blue Mitchell, trumpeter, 49
- May 26 - Stefano Ballarini, baritone, 76
- June 5 – Jack Haley, actor, singer (Wizard of Oz) 80
- June 21 – Angus MacLise, American drummer and songwriter (Velvet Underground and Theatre of Eternal Music), 41 (hypoglycemia and pulmonary tuberculosis)
- June 29 – Lowell George, singer, songwriter and guitarist, founder of Little Feat, 34 (heart attack)
- July 3 – Louis Durey, composer, 91
- July 6 – Van McCoy, singer, 39 (heart attack)
- July 12 – Minnie Riperton, singer, 31 (breast cancer)
- July 14 – Pedro Flores, composer, 85
- July 16 – Alfred Deller, countertenor, 67
- August 19 – Dorsey Burnette, Rockabilly singer, 46 (heart attack)
- August 25 – Stan Kenton, bandleader, 67
- September 2 – Jacques Février, pianist, 79
- September 6 – Guy Bolton, English librettist, 94
- September 22 – Richard Nibley, violinist, 66
- September 27
  - Gracie Fields, actress and singer, 81
  - Jimmy McCulloch, guitarist (Wings), 26
- October 1 – Roy Harris, composer, 81
- October 13 – Rebecca Helferich Clarke, viola player and composer, 93
- October 22 – Nadia Boulanger, French composer, conductor, and music teacher, 92
- October 27 – Germaine Lubin, operatic soprano, 89
- November 11 – Dimitri Tiomkin, film composer and conductor, 85
- November 13 – Freda Betti, French mezzo-soprano opera singer, 55
- November 17 – John Glascock, rock bassist, 28
- November 23 – Judee Sill, singer-songwriter, 35
- November 30 – Joyce Grenfell, actress and singer-songwriter, 69
- December 21 – Nansi Richards, harpist, 91
- December 30 – Richard Rodgers, composer and songwriter, 77

== Awards ==
- Grammy Awards of 1979
- 1979 Country Music Association Awards
- Eurovision Song Contest 1979
- Japan Music Awards
- 21st Japan Record Awards

== See also ==
- Record labels established in 1979
- 1979 in music (UK)
