= Billboard Year-End Hot Soul Singles of 1979 =

American music chart

This is a list of Billboard magazine's Top Hot Soul Singles of 1979.

No.	Title	Artist(s)
1	"Good Times"	Chic
2	"Ring My Bell"	Anita Ward
3	"Don't Stop 'Til You Get Enough"	Michael Jackson
4	"Bustin' Loose"	Chuck Brown and the Soul Searchers
5	"Le Freak"	Chic
6	"Aqua Boogie"	Parliament
7	"Reunited"	Peaches & Herb
8	"I Got My Mind Made Up"	Instant Funk
9	"I'm Every Woman"	Chaka Khan
10	"Disco Nights (Rock-Freak)"	GQ
11	"One Nation Under a Groove"	Funkadelic
12	"Shake Your Body (Down to the Ground)"	The Jacksons
13	"Ain't No Stoppin' Us Now"	McFadden & Whitehead
14	"Turn Off the Lights"	Teddy Pendergrass
15	"Got to Be Real"	Cheryl Lynn
16	"Bad Girls"	Donna Summer
17	"What Cha Gonna Do with My Lovin'"	Stephanie Mills
18	"Why Leave Us Alone"	Five Special
19	"Do You Wanna Go Party"	KC and the Sunshine Band
20	"You Gonna Make Me Love Somebody Else"	The Jones Girls
21	"I Don't Know if it's Right"	Evelyn "Champagne" King
22	"Chase"	Con Funk Shun
23	"I'm a Sucker for Your Love"	Teena Marie
24	"What You Won't Do for Love"	Bobby Caldwell
25	"Get Down"	Gene Chandler
26	"Shake Your Groove Thing"	Peaches & Herb
27	"It's All the Way Live"	Lakeside
28	"Livin' It Up (Friday Night)"	Bell and James
29	"Never Had a Love Like This Before"	Tavares
30	"The Boss"	Diana Ross
31	"I Wanna Be with You"	The Isley Brothers
32	"Hot Number"	Foxy
33	"September"	Earth, Wind & Fire
34	"In the Mood"	Tyrone Davis
35	"I'll Never Love This Way Again"	Dionne Warwick
36	"Feel That You're Feelin'"	Maze
37	"I Don't Want Nobody Else (To Dance with You)"	Narada Michael Walden
38	"It Must Be Love"	Alton McClain and Destiny
39	"I Just Want to Be"	Cameo
40	"Firecracker"	Mass Production
41	"After the Love Has Gone"	Earth, Wind & Fire
42	"Memory Lane"	Minnie Riperton
43	"Oh Honey"	Delegation
44	"I'm So into You"	Peabo Bryson
45	"He's the Greatest Dancer"	Sister Sledge
46	"You Can't Change That"	Raydio
47	"Love Ballad"	George Benson
48	"Shake"	The Gap Band
49	"Found a Cure"	Ashford & Simpson
50	"Now That We Found Love"	Third World

== See also ==
- 1979 in music
- Billboard Year-End Hot 100 singles of 1979
- List of Hot Soul Singles number ones of 1979
