= Billboard Year-End Hot 100 singles of 1979 =

Ranking of recorded music

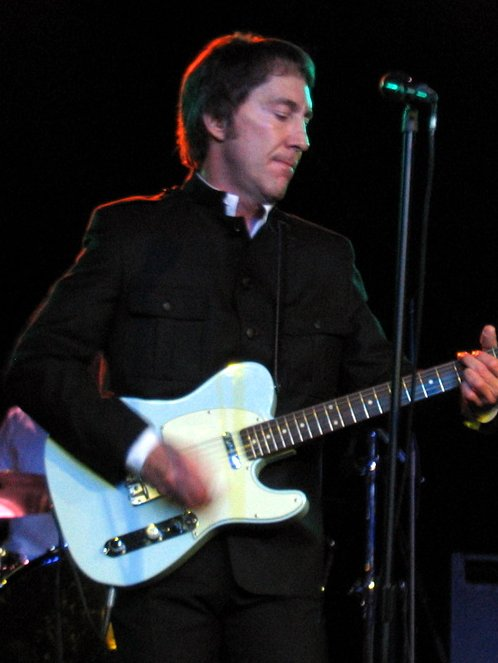
"My Sharona" by the Knack, led by singer Doug Fieger (pictured in 2005) was the number-one song of 1979.

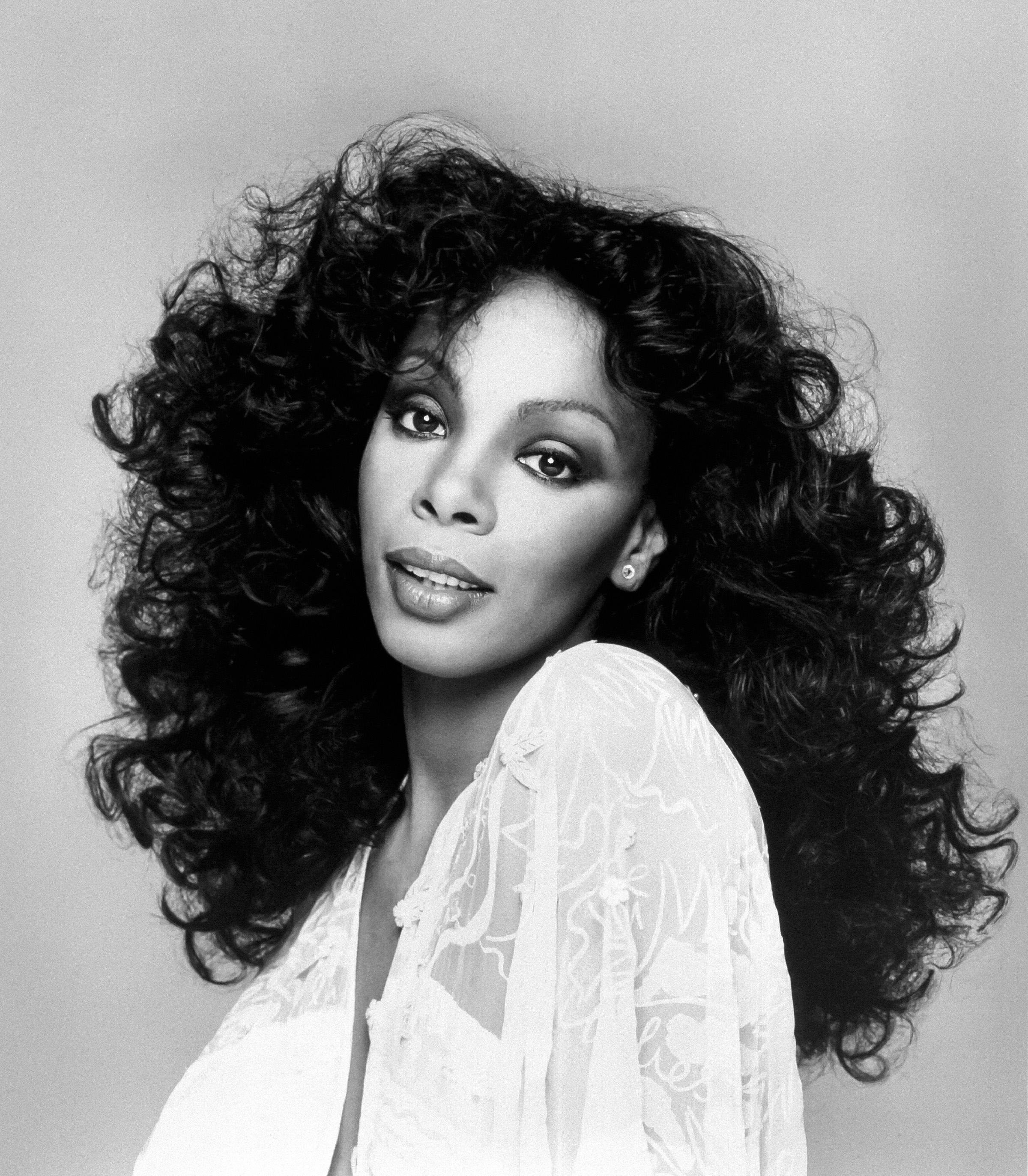
Donna Summer (pictured) had four songs on the year-end chart of 1979, the most of any artist that year: "Bad Girls" at number two, "Hot Stuff" at number seven, "MacArthur Park" at number 12, and "Heaven Knows" at number 39.

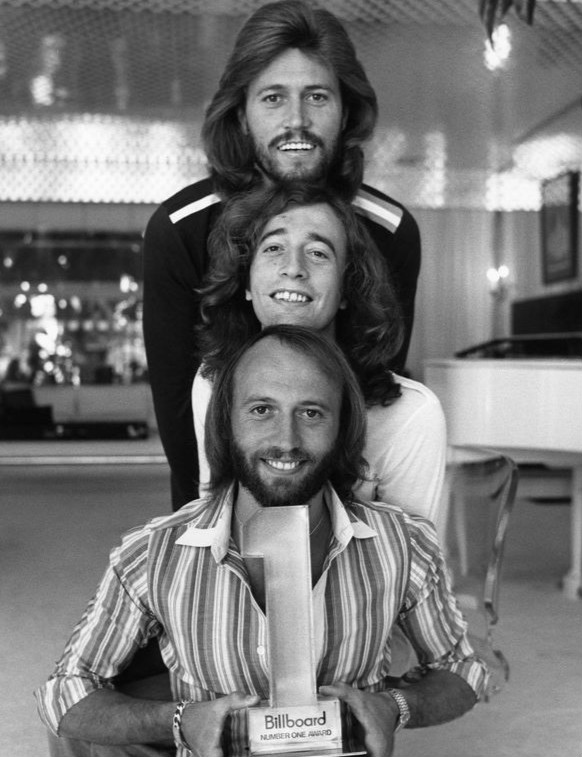
The Bee Gees had three songs within the top-40 of 1979's year-end chart: "Too Much Heaven" at number 11, "Tragedy" at number 16, and "Love You Inside Out" at number 33.

This is a list of Billboard magazine's Top Hot 100 songs of 1979. The Top 100, as revealed in the year-end edition of Billboard dated December 22, 1979.

No.	Title	Artist(s)
1	"My Sharona"	The Knack
2	"Bad Girls"	Donna Summer
3	"Le Freak"	Chic
4	"Da Ya Think I'm Sexy?"	Rod Stewart
5	"Reunited"	Peaches & Herb
6	"I Will Survive"	Gloria Gaynor
7	"Hot Stuff"	Donna Summer
8	"Y.M.C.A."	Village People
9	"Ring My Bell"	Anita Ward
10	"Sad Eyes"	Robert John
11	"Too Much Heaven"	Bee Gees
12	"MacArthur Park"	Donna Summer
13	"When You're in Love with a Beautiful Woman"	Dr. Hook
14	"Makin' It"	David Naughton
15	"Fire"	The Pointer Sisters
16	"Tragedy"	Bee Gees
17	"A Little More Love"	Olivia Newton-John
18	"Heart of Glass"	Blondie
19	"What a Fool Believes"	The Doobie Brothers
20	"Good Times"	Chic
21	"You Don't Bring Me Flowers"	Neil Diamond & Barbra Streisand
22	"Knock on Wood"	Amii Stewart
23	"Stumblin' In"	Suzi Quatro & Chris Norman
24	"Lead Me On"	Maxine Nightingale
25	"Shake Your Body (Down to the Ground)"	The Jacksons
26	"Don't Cry Out Loud"	Melissa Manchester
27	"The Logical Song"	Supertramp
28	"My Life"	Billy Joel
29	"Just When I Needed You Most"	Randy VanWarmer
30	"You Can't Change That"	Raydio
31	"Shake Your Groove Thing"	Peaches & Herb
32	"I'll Never Love This Way Again"	Dionne Warwick
33	"Love You Inside Out"	Bee Gees
34	"I Want You to Want Me"	Cheap Trick
35	"The Main Event/Fight"	Barbra Streisand
36	"Mama Can't Buy You Love"	Elton John
37	"I Was Made for Dancin'"	Leif Garrett
38	"After the Love Has Gone"	Earth, Wind & Fire
39	"Heaven Knows"	Donna Summer and Brooklyn Dreams
40	"The Gambler"	Kenny Rogers
41	"Lotta Love"	Nicolette Larson
42	"Lady"	Little River Band
43	"Heaven Must Have Sent You"	Bonnie Pointer
44	"Hold the Line"	Toto
45	"He's the Greatest Dancer"	Sister Sledge
46	"Sharing the Night Together"	Dr. Hook
47	"She Believes in Me"	Kenny Rogers
48	"In the Navy"	Village People
49	"Music Box Dancer"	Frank Mills
50	"The Devil Went Down to Georgia"	The Charlie Daniels Band
51	"Gold"	John Stewart
52	"Goodnight Tonight"	Wings
53	"We Are Family"	Sister Sledge
54	"Rock 'n' Roll Fantasy"	Bad Company
55	"Every 1's a Winner"	Hot Chocolate
56	"Take Me Home"	Cher
57	"Boogie Wonderland"	Earth, Wind & Fire & The Emotions
58	"(Our Love) Don't Throw It All Away"	Andy Gibb
59	"What You Won't Do for Love"	Bobby Caldwell
60	"New York Groove"	Ace Frehley
61	"Sultans of Swing"	Dire Straits
62	"I Want Your Love"	Chic
63	"Chuck E.'s In Love"	Rickie Lee Jones
64	"I Love the Nightlife"	Alicia Bridges
65	"Ain't No Stoppin' Us Now"	McFadden & Whitehead
66	"Lonesome Loser"	Little River Band
67	"Renegade"	Styx
68	"Love Is the Answer"	England Dan & John Ford Coley
69	"Got to Be Real"	Cheryl Lynn
70	"Born to Be Alive"	Patrick Hernandez
71	"Shine a Little Love"	Electric Light Orchestra
72	"I Just Fall in Love Again"	Anne Murray
73	"Shake It"	Ian Matthews
74	"I Was Made for Lovin' You"	Kiss
75	"I Just Wanna Stop"	Gino Vannelli
76	"Disco Nights (Rock-Freak)"	GQ
77	"Ooo Baby Baby"	Linda Ronstadt
78	"September"	Earth, Wind & Fire
79	"Time Passages"	Al Stewart
80	"Rise"	Herb Alpert
81	"Don't Bring Me Down"	Electric Light Orchestra
82	"Promises"	Eric Clapton
83	"Get Used to It"	Roger Voudouris
84	"How Much I Feel"	Ambrosia
85	"Suspicions"	Eddie Rabbitt
86	"You Take My Breath Away"	Rex Smith
87	"How You Gonna See Me Now"	Alice Cooper
88	"Double Vision"	Foreigner
89	"Everytime I Think of You"	The Babys
90	"I Got My Mind Made Up (You Can Get It Girl)"	Instant Funk
91	"Don't Stop 'til You Get Enough"	Michael Jackson
92	"Bad Case of Loving You (Doctor, Doctor)"	Robert Palmer
93	"Somewhere in the Night"	Barry Manilow
94	"We've Got Tonight"	Bob Seger & The Silver Bullet Band
95	"Dance the Night Away"	Van Halen
96	"Dancin' Shoes"	Nigel Olsson
97	"The Boss"	Diana Ross
98	"Sail On"	Commodores
99	"I Do Love You"	GQ
100	"Strange Way"	Firefall

== See also ==
- 1979 in music
- Billboard Year-End Hot Soul Singles of 1979
- List of Billboard Hot 100 number-one singles of 1979
- List of Billboard Hot 100 top-ten singles in 1979
