= GQ Two =

Studio album by GQ
- Released: 1980
- Studio: Sigma Sound, New York City
- Genre: R&B, disco
- Length: 40:03
- Label: Arista
- Producer: Jimmy Simpson

GQ chronology
Disco Nights (1979)	GQ Two (1980)	Face to Face (1981)

Singles from Two
- 1. "Standing Ovation" / "Reason for the Season" Released: January 1980; 2. "Sitting in the Park" / "It's Like That" Released: April 1980; 3. "Someday (In Your Life)" / "Don't Stop This Feeling" Released: September 1980

Professional ratings
Review scores
Source	Rating
AllMusic	3/5 stars
Smash Hits	7½/10

GQ Two is the second album by American soul/disco group GQ, released in 1980 on the Arista label. It peaked at #9 on the R&B chart and #46 on the pop listing. Unlike its predecessor, Disco Nights, no single from this album crossed over to the Billboard Hot 100, but "Sitting in the Park" and "Standing Ovation" reached #9 and #12, respectively, on the R&B chart. Like "I Do Love You" from Disco Nights, the former was a cover of a 1965 Billy Stewart recording.

== Track listing ==
All tracks are written by Emanuel LeBlanc, Herb Lane, Keith Crier and Paul Service unless otherwise noted.

No.	Title	Writer(s)	Length
1.	"Standing Ovation"		5:32
2.	"Is It Cool"		4:05
3.	"Someday (In Your Life)"		4:56
4.	"Lies"		5:19
5.	"GQ Down"		3:56
6.	"Don't Stop This Feeling"		4:59
7.	"Reason for the Season"		3:41
8.	"Sitting in the Park"	Billy Stewart	3:18
9.	"It's Like That"		4:17
Total length:			40:03

== Personnel ==
=== GQ ===
- Emmanuel Rahiem LeBlanc – lead and rhythm guitar, lead vocals
- Keith "Sabu" Crier – bass, vocals
- Paul Service – drums, vocals
- Herb Lane – keyboards, vocals

=== Management ===
- Tony Lopez – management and direction

=== Technical personnel ===
- Jimmy Simpson – production, mixing
- Larkin Arnold – executive producer
- Steve Toos, Michael Hutchinson – recording engineers
- John Potoker, Matthew Weiner, Craig Michaels, Karla Bandini, Doug Grinbergs – assistant engineers
- Barbara Tiesi – studio coordinator
- Stuart Romaine – mastering

=== Artwork ===
- John Ford – photography
- Gerald Huerta – logo design
- Webster McKnight – hairstylist
- Lisa Daurio – stylist
- Donn Davenport – art direction

== Charts ==
Chart (1980)	Peak position	Chart (1980)	Peak position
US Black Albums	9	US Pop	46

Singles

Year	Single	Chart	Position
1980	"Standing Ovation"	US Dance	35
1980	"Standing Ovation"	US R&B	12
1980	"Sitting in the Park"	US Pop	101
1980	"Sitting in the Park"	US R&B	9
