= Deadly Weapons (album) =

Studio album by Steve Beresford, John Zorn, Tonie Marshall & David Toop
- Released: 1986
- Recorded: 1986
- Studio: Dave Hunt Audio Engineering Studio, London
- Genre: Avant-garde
- Length: 38:00
- Label: Nato
- Producer: Jean Rochard

Deadly Weapons is an album by Steve Beresford, John Zorn, Tonie Marshall and David Toop. The album was originally released on the Nato label in 1986. It is designed as film noir soundtrack music to a film which does not exist and could be considered a forerunner to Zorn's Spillane (1987).

== Reception ==
The Allmusic review by Thom Jurek awarded the album 4½ stars, stating that "this quartet has done what so many attempt, but so few actually succeed at: They've created a virtual cinema of the unconscious, colored by sound yet evoking not only images but sounds, feelings, and textural awareness; beautiful and harrowing."

Professional ratings
Review scores
Source	Rating
Allmusic	4.5/5 stars

== Track listing ==
1. "Shockproof" (Beresford) - 8:13
2. "Du Gris" (Ferdinand Louis Benech, Ernest Dumont) - 3:17
3. "King Cobra" (Beresford, Toop, Marshall, Zorn) - 4:46
4. "Tallulah" (Beresford, Toop, Marshall, Zorn) - 3:20
5. "Dumb Boxer" (Toop) - 2:15
6. "Lady Whirlwind" (Toop) - 0:47
7. "Shadow Boxer" (Toop, Marshall) - 3:03
8. "Sitting in the Park" (Billy Stewart) - 1:42
9. "Snow Blood" (Toop) - 2:27
10. "Chen Pe'i Pe'i" (Zorn, Toop) - 3:08
11. "Jane Mansfield" (Beresford, Toop) - 5:02

Recorded at Dave Hunt Audio Engineering studio in 1986 and produced by Jean Rochard

== Personnel ==
- Steve Beresford – keyboards, tapes, trumpet, guitar, percussions
- David Toop – guitar, pedal steel guitar, flutes, percussions
- John Zorn – alto, keyboards
- Tonie Marshall – vocals
