= Standing ovation (disambiguation) =

Standing ovation is a form of applause where members of a seated audience applaud while standing up.

Standing ovation may also refer to:

- Standing Ovation (film), a 2010 musical film
- "Standing Ovation" (song), a 1980 single by GQ
- "Standing Ovation", a song by American rapper Young Jeezy from the 2005 album Let's Get It: Thug Motivation 101
- Standing Ovation: The Greatest Songs from the Stage, a 2012 album by Susan Boyle
- Standing Ovation (Count Basie album), 1969
- "Standing Ovation", a song by Good Charlotte from the 2010 album Cardiology
- "Standing Ovation", a song by Little Simz from the 2021 album Sometimes I Might Be Introvert
- Standing Ovation is the finishing move of WWE, former TNA Wrestling Scottish wrestler Joe Hendry who works for the WWE NXT brand.
