= Face to Face (GQ album) =

Studio album by GQ
- Released: October 1981
- Genre: R&B, Disco
- Length: 41:10
- Label: Arista
- Producer: Jimmy Simpson, GQ

GQ chronology
GQ Two (1980)	Face to Face (1981)

Singles from Face to Face
- 1. "Shake"/"Face to Face" Released: May 1981; 2. "Sad Girl""/"Shy Baby" Released: January 1982

Professional ratings
Review scores
Source	Rating
Allmusic	3.5/5 stars

Face to Face is the third and final album by American soul/disco group GQ, released in 1981 on the Arista label. It peaked at #18 on the R&B chart and #140 on the pop listing. Two singles, "Shake" and "Sad Girl", were released; the latter became the group's third to chart on the Billboard Hot 100, peaking at #93.

Known as a four-piece band in their heyday, by the release of this album, GQ had been reduced to a trio, with the departure of drummer Paul Service. Service was not officially replaced on this release, and thus, only the remaining three members are featured on the cover. The drum work on the album was performed by session drummers Howard King and Chris Parker.

== Track listing ==
1. "Shake" (Barbara Norris/Richard Sorce) - 5:02
2. "You Put Some Love in My Life" (Gino Cunico/Harvey Scales/William Harralson) - 3:47
3. "Shy Baby" (Emanuel Rahiem LeBlanc/Herb Lane/Keith Crier) - 4:04
4. "Sad Girl" (Jay Wiggins/Lloyd Smith) - 3:05
5. "I Love (The Skin You're In)" (Kenny Nolan) - 4:47
6. "Boogie Shoogie Feelin'" (Nolan) - 5:28
7. "Dark Side of the Sun" (Nolan) - 5:04
8. "Face to Face" (LeBlanc/Lane/Crier) - 4:43
9. "You've Got the Floor" (LeBlanc/Lane/Crier) - 5:10

== Credits ==
- Produced by: Jimmy Simpson, GQ
- Strings Arranged by: Josef Joubert (Track 1), Ray Chew (Tracks 2–3)
- Horns and Strings Arranged by: Joubert (Tracks 6–7)
- Lead Guitar, Lead Vocals: Emmanuel Rahiem LeBlanc
- Bass, Backing Vocals: Keith Crier
- Piano: Joubert
- Electric Piano, Backing Vocals: Herb Lane
- Synthesizer: Ed Walsh (Tracks 4–7, 9)
- Drums: Chris Parker (Tracks 2–7), Howard King (Tracks 1, 8–9)
- Percussion: Jimmy Maelen (Tracks 3–5), Ralph MacDonald (Tracks 1–2, 5, 7, 9)

== Charts ==
Chart (1981)	Peak position	Chart (1981)	Peak position
US Black Albums	18	US Pop	140

Singles

Year	Single	Chart	Position
1981	"Shake"	US R&B	23
1982	"Sad Girl"	US Pop	93
1982	"Sad Girl"	US R&B	39
