= Pei-Ying Lee =

Taiwanese soprano singer (1977–2011)

Pei-Ying Lee (November 21, 1977 – July 30, 2011) was a Taiwanese soprano singer.

Born in Taipei, she graduated from the Department of Vocal Music at the National Institute of the Arts (now Taipei National University of the Arts). From 2001, she served as the lead vocalist of the heavy metal band Seraphim, with whom she recorded their first three albums: The Soul that Never Dies, The Equal Spirit, and Ai. Lee recalled that, prior to joining Seraphim, she was a classical musician, having little exposure to heavy metal genre.

In 2006, she earned a Doctorate in Performance, the highest performance diploma, from the University of Music and Theatre Leipzig in Germany. Lee was a soloist at the Leipzig Opera and continued to perform across Europe and Taiwan.

She died at the age of 34 on July 30, 2011, following a minor heart surgery.
