= Disco Nights =

Studio album by GQ
- Released: 1979
- Studios: Sigma Sound, Philadelphia, Pennsylvania; Sound Palace
- Genres: Disco, R&B
- Length: 39:32
- Label: Arista
- Producers: Beau Ray Fleming, Jimmy Simpson; assisted by Vernon Gibbs

GQ chronology
Disco Nights (1979)	GQ Two (1980)

Singles from Disco Nights
- 1. "Disco Nights (Rock-Freak)"/"Boogie Oogie Oogie" Released: January 1979; 2. "Make My Dreams a Reality"/"This Happy Feeling" Released: June 1979; 3. "I Do Love You"/"Make My Dreams a Reality" Released: July 1979

Professional ratings
Review scores
Source	Rating
Allmusic	3/5 stars
Christgau's Record Guide	B

Disco Nights is the debut album by American soul/funk group GQ, released in 1979 on the Arista label. The lead single "Disco Nights (Rock Freak)" was a major crossover hit, topping the R&B chart and peaking at #12 on the pop chart. The follow-up, a cover of Billy Stewart's 1965 classic "I Do Love You", also made the R&B top 5 and the pop top 20. On the back of its hit singles, the album became a big seller. It reached #2 R&B and #13 pop and was certified Platinum (one million copies shipped) by the RIAA.

This album should not be confused with a later GQ compilation of the same name, and with a similar cover image.

== Track listing ==
All songs written by Emanuel LeBlanc, Herb Lane, Keith Crier and Paul Service except where noted.

1. "Disco Nights (Rock-Freak)" - 5:51
2. "Make My Dreams a Reality" - 6:12
3. "It's Your Love" - 4:14
4. "Spirit" - 3:46
5. "This Happy Feeling" - 5:22
6. "Wonderful" - 5:08
7. "Boogie Oogie Oogie" (Janice Johnson, Perry Kibble) - 4:14
8. "I Do Love You" (Billy Stewart) - 4:45

== Personnel ==
=== GQ ===
- Emanuel Rahiem LeBlanc: Rhythm and lead guitars, main vocals
- Herb Lane: Keyboards, backing vocals
- Keith Crier: Bass, backing vocals
- Paul Service: Drums, backing vocals

=== Additional personnel ===
- Sammy Figueroa: Percussion on track 5

== Production ==
- Executive Producer: Larkin Arnold
- Arranged by GQ
- Horns arranged by Ray Chew
- Produced by Beau Ray Fleming and Jimmy Simpson for Tony Productions; assistant producer: Vernon Gibbs
- Recorded at Sigma Sound by Andy Abrams and Sound Palace by Randy Bean and Robin Martinez
- Mixed at Sigma Sound by Andy Abrams
- Tracks 1–6 published by Arista Music/Chrysalis Music Ltd.; track 7 published by Carlin Music and track 8 published by Chevis Music

== Charts ==
Chart (1979)	Peak position	Chart (1979)	Peak position
US Black Albums	2	US Pop	13

Singles

Year	Single	Chart	Position
1979	"Disco Nights (Rock-Freak)"	US Pop	12
1979	"Disco Nights (Rock-Freak)"	US Dance	3
1979	"Disco Nights (Rock-Freak)"	US R&B	1
1979	"Make My Dreams a Reality"	US R&B	8
1979	"I Do Love You"	US Pop	20
1979	"I Do Love You"	US R&B	5
