= Sitting in the Park (song) =

Single by Billy Stewart

from the album I Do Love You
- B-side: "Once Again"
- Released: June 1965
- Genre: Soul
- Length: 3:05
- Label: Chess
- Songwriter: Billy Stewart

Billy Stewart singles chronology
"I Do Love You" (1965)	"Sitting in the Park" (1965)	"How Nice It Is" (1965)

"Sitting in the Park" is a 1965 song written and performed by Billy Stewart. The single was Stewart's fourth and most successful entry on the soul chart in the United States. "Sitting in the Park" peaked at number four on the soul chart and number twenty-four on the Billboard Hot 100. The song was featured on his 1965 album, I Do Love You.

The song was arranged by Phil Wright.

== Cover versions ==
- In 1966, Georgie Fame went to number twelve on UK charts with his version of the song.
- In 1969, Alton Ellis released a version of the single in Jamaica.
- In 1969, Owen Gray and Maximum Breed released a version of the song as a single in the UK.
- In 1973, Keith Hampshire released a version of the song as a single in Germany.
- In 1973, Slim Smith released a version of the song on his album Memorial.
- In 1974, Mike Patto released a version of the song as a single in the UK.
- In 1976, Winston Francis released a version of the song as a single in the UK.
- In 1976, Dr Alimantado released a version of the song as a single in Jamaica.
- In 1980, Bobby Thurston recorded a cover that featured as the ‘B’ side of the single "Check Out The Groove", this version also featuring on his album You Got What It Takes.
- In 1980, GQ peaked at number nine on the soul chart with their version and number 101 on the pop chart.
- In 1980, Bobby McClure released a version of the song as a single, but it did not chart.
- In 1981, Flo & Eddie released a version of the song on their album Rock Steady with Flo & Eddie.
- In 1986, Steve Beresford, John Zorn, Tonie Marshall, and David Toop released a version of the song on their album Deadly Weapons.
- In 1987 NRBQ released a live version on their album, God Bless Us All (Rounder Records)
- In 1997, The Zombies released a live version of the song on their album Zombie Heaven.
- In 2002, Quix*o*tic released a version of the song on their album Mortal Mirror.

== Sampled versions ==
- In 1992, Hi-C sampled the song on his song of the same title, from his album Skanless.
- In 1995, Slick Rick sampled the song on his song Sittin' in My Car, from his album Behind Bars.
- In 2015, Tomppabeats sampled the song in his song "Good Morning".
- In 2018, Lily Allen sampled the song in the introduction to her song "Cake", from her album No Shame.
