= Quinn Weng =

Taiwanese singer (born 1979)

- Born: Quinn Weng; 20 April 1979 (age 47)
- Origin: Kaohsiung, Taiwan
- Genres: Symphonic metal, Power metal
- Occupations: Singer, hardware engineer
- Instrument: Vocals
- Years active: 2004 – present
- Label: Magnum
- Member of: Seraphim

Quinn Weng (Chinese: 翁碩瑜, born 20 April 1979) is a Taiwanese-Canadian mezzo-soprano singer and is the lead vocalist of the power metal band Seraphim. She joined the band replacing the singer Pay Lee in 2004.

== Discography ==
=== With Seraphim ===
- Ai (愛) (2004) - Japanese version, the bonus song "My" was recorded by Quinn Weng
- Rising (日出東方) (2007)

=== With Beto Vazueqz Infinity ===
- Flying Towards the New Horizon (2006) - Lead & backing vocals on track 9 'She Is My Guide'
