= Seraphim (band) =

Taiwanese power metal band

- Origin: Taipei, Taiwan
- Genres: Power metal
- Years active: 2001–present
- Label: Magnum Music
- Members: Kessier Hsu; Quinn Weng; Van Shaw; Mars Liu; Thiago Trinsi

Seraphim (Chinese: 六翼天使; pinyin: Liù Yì Tiānshǐ) is a Taiwanese power metal band.

== History ==
Formed in 2001 in Taipei, Taiwan, they recorded their first song "Love Hate" for a demo weeks later, gaining notice and eventually a contract from Magnum Music (Taiwan) in April. Within a month they recorded their first album, The Soul That Never Dies (不死魂), which was released in August.

Following the album's release they did a few shows to help promote it, and by November they started writing new material for a second album. In January 2002, they were invited to perform at the Kung-Ming music festival in mainland China. Soon afterwards they began recording their second album, The Equal Spirit (平等精靈). Their debut album also gained a European release through the independent label Arise.

The second album was released in Taiwan on 10 September 2002.

After doing one show to promote the album guitarist Dan Chang left the band, and was replaced by Lucas Huang in December. An English version of The Equal Spirit was released in January 2003, and after a European release they participated in Taiwan's Midsummer Night Tour later that year. They released the Chinese edition of Ai (愛), their third album, by February.

Quinn Weng replaced vocalist Pay Lee on 14 March 2004. By that time they were invited to several more festivals in the summer for their first world tour, including Savage Metal Fest in Russia, Dong open air in Germany, Metal Kingdom in Japan, Asian Rock Festival in Seoul, South Korea, and others around Taiwan and China. On July 2 they released Ai in Europe.

By June 2005 they had new drummer Van Shaw, and performed with a popular German Power metal band Edguy in Taipei and Hong Kong by March 2006. In the same year, Quinn Weng was featured as a guest on Beto Vázquez Infinity's Flying Towards the New Horizon album. By August 2007, Seraphim spread their second world tour in Europe.

Seraphim released their fourth album, Rising (日出東方) in June 2007. An English version of the album was released in 2008. Rising is the first album to feature vocalist Quinn Weng.

== Lineup ==
=== Current members ===
- Kessier Hsu - guitars, backing vocals (2001–present)
- Quinn Weng - lead vocals (2004–present)
- Van Shaw - drums (2005–present)
- Mars Liu - bass (2007–present)
- Thiago Trinsi - guitars (2010–present)

=== Former members ===
- Pay Lee - lead vocals (2001–2004; died 2011)
- Simon Lin - drums (2001–2004)
- Jax Yeh - bass, backing vocals (2001–2006)
- Lucas Huang - guitars (2002–2006)

== Discography ==
- The Soul that Never Dies (2001)
- The Equal Spirit (2003)
- Ai (2004)
- Rising (2007)
