= I Do Love You (Billy Stewart song) =

Single by Billy Stewart

from the album I Do Love You
- B-side: "Keep Loving"
- Released: February 1965
- Genre: Soul
- Length: 2:58
- Label: Chess
- Songwriter: Billy Stewart

Billy Stewart singles chronology
"Tell It Like It Is" (1964)	"I Do Love You" (1965)	"Sitting in the Park" (1965)

"I Do Love You" is a song written and performed by Billy Stewart. It reached #6 on the U.S. R&B chart and #26 on the Billboard Hot 100 in 1965. It was featured on his 1965 album, I Do Love You.

Arrangement was by Phil Wright.

Stewart re-released the song as a single in 1969 which reached #94 on the Billboard Hot 100.

The sound is loosely based around the last 30 seconds of The Impressions track, "I've Been Trying" from their 1964 album Keep On Pushing.

== GQ version ==
GQ released a version as a single in July 1979 which reached #5 on the U.S. R&B chart and #20 on the Billboard Hot 100. It was featured on their 1979 album, Disco Nights.

The single ranked #99 on the Billboard Year-End Hot 100 singles of 1979.

The song is featured in the 2001 film Baby Boy.

Warren G sampled GQ's version on the song "Relax Ya Mind" from his 1997 album, Take a Look Over Your Shoulder.

== Other versions ==
- Barbara Mason, on her 1968 album, Oh How It Hurts.
- Jackie Edwards, as a single in 1972 in the UK, but it did not chart.
- The Heptones, as a single in 1972, but it did not chart.
- Janet Kay, as a single in 1980 in the UK, but it did not chart.
