= Disco Nights (Rock-Freak) =

Single by GQ

from the album Disco Nights
- B-side: "Boogie Oogie Oogie"
- Released: February 1979
- Recorded: December 17, 1978
- Studio: Sigma Sound, Philadelphia, Pennsylvania
- Genre: Disco
- Length: 3:58 (single version); 5:51 (album version); 8:43 (12" version)
- Label: Arista
- Songwriters: Emanuel LeBlanc; Herb Lane; Keith Crier; Paul Service
- Producers: Beau Ray Fleming; Jimmy Simpson

GQ singles chronology
"Zone" (1976)	"Disco Nights (Rock-Freak)" (1979)	"Make My Dreams a Reality" (1979)

"Disco Nights (Rock-Freak)" (also titled "(Rock-Freaks) Disco / Boogie") is a song written by Emanuel LeBlanc, Herb Lane, Keith Crier and Paul Service and performed by American band GQ, from their 1979 debut studio album Disco Nights. The song was produced by Larkin Arnold, Beau Ray and Fleming Jimmy Simpson.

The single ranked No. 76 on the Billboard Year-End Hot 100 singles of 1979.

== Charts ==
The single spent two weeks at number one on the soul chart during the spring of 1979, and was the first number-one soul hit for Arista Records, and peaked at No. 12 on the pop chart in April of that year. The single also peaked at No. 3 on the disco chart. Outside the US, it peaked at No. 42 on the UK charts.

=== Weekly charts ===
Year-end chart (1979)	Peak
Australian Kent Music Report	97

=== Year-end charts ===
Year-end chart (1979)	Rank
US Top Pop Singles (Billboard)	76

== Sampling ==
Kon Kan sampled the song in their 1988 song "I Beg Your Pardon".
