= GQ (band) =

American band

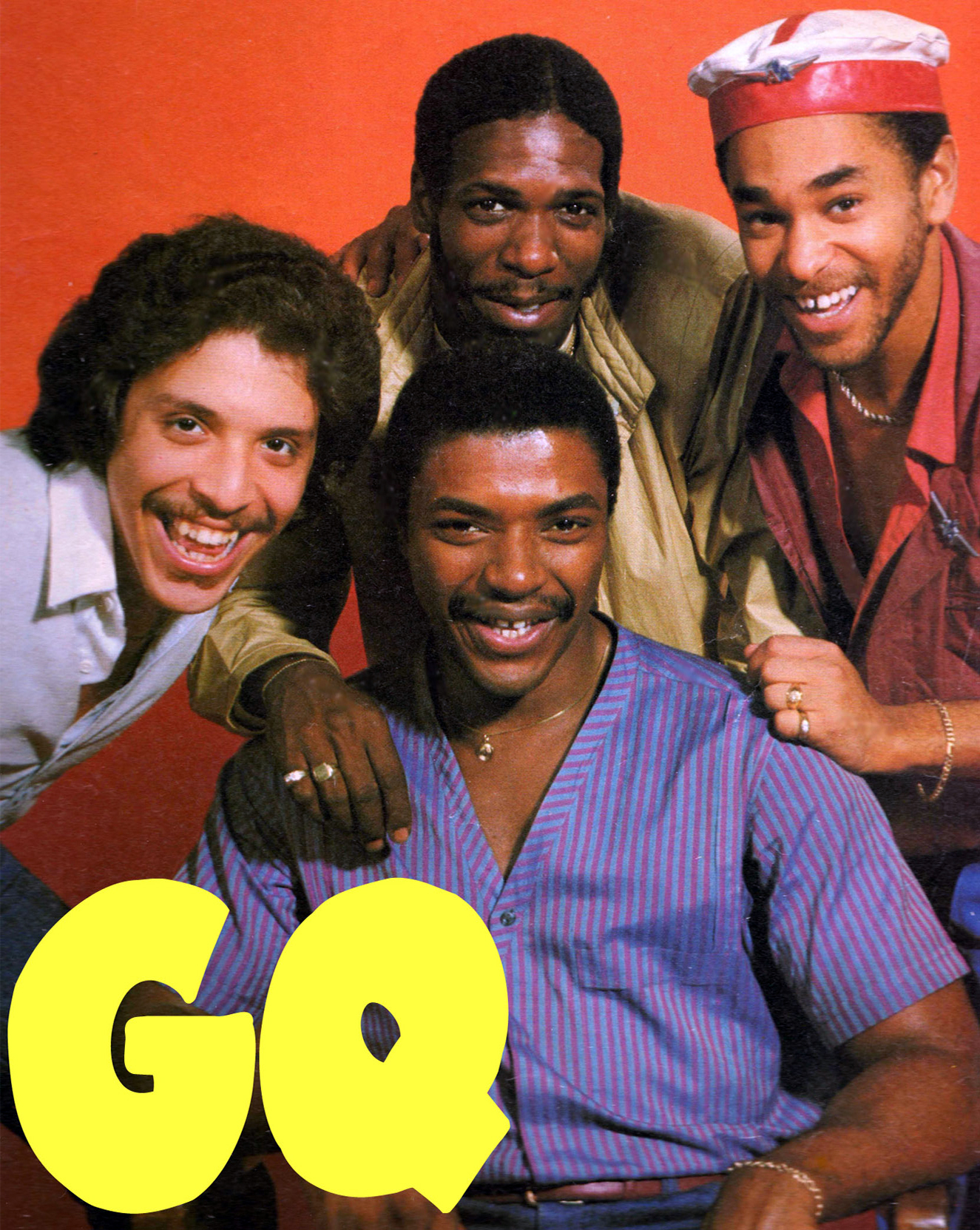
- Band members clockwise from top: Keith "Sabu" Crier, Emanuel Rahiem LeBlanc, Herb Lane and Steve Adorno

Background information
- Origin: The Bronx, New York, U.S.
- Genres: Funk, R&B, soul music, disco
- Years active: 1968–1991, 1999
- Labels: Arista
- Past members: Emanuel Rahiem LeBlanc; Keith Crier (deceased); Herb Lane; Paul Service; Steve Adorno; Kevin J. Zambrana

GQ was an American musical group formed in The Bronx, New York, primarily noted for its success in funk, R&B, soul music and disco. The core membership of the group commenced playing professionally, under different group names, as of 1968.

== History ==
GQ was first formed in 1968 as a quartet called Sabu & the Survivors, with "Sabu" being a moniker of member Keith Crier. The group then evolved in the 1970s as The Rhythm Makers, playing primarily funk music and were Five Percenters. The Rhythm Makers were composed of Emanuel Rahiem LeBlanc (lead vocals and rhythm guitar), Keith "Sabu" Crier (bass and vocals), Herb Lane (keyboards and vocals) and Kenny Banks (drums and vocals). The group released one album, Soul on Your Side in 1976 on the De-Lite Records subsidiary Vigor Records, from which the group had one major international dancefloor hit, "Zone". At the time that Kenny Banks was replaced by Paul Service in 1978, the group's manager suggested that the group name be changed to "GQ", which stood for "good quality". The group signed with Arista Records.

GQ became quite successful playing music representative of the period's disco influenced sound. They had several highly ranked singles in multiple markets (US Pop, US R&B, US Disco/Club). Their biggest hit was 1979's "Disco Nights (Rock-Freak)", a single from their debut album Disco Nights, which reached #1 (for two weeks) on the R&B singles chart, #3 on the Hot Dance Club Play and #12 on the Billboard Hot 100. It sold over one million copies in the US alone. The track also peaked at #42 in the UK Singles Chart. It was a reworked version of the Rhythm Makers title-track to Soul on Your Side. The follow-up Billy Stewart remake, "I Do Love You", was also successful, reaching #20 on the Billboard Hot 100.

Drummer Paul Service fractured his wrist in a car accident in 1980. On the cover of the third and final album by the group, Face to Face, Service is noticeably absent. The band ultimately replaced him with drummer Steve "Beatz" Adorno, who performed with GQ from 1980 to 2010.

Keith "Sabu" Crier was the son of Arthur Crier, a member of the doo-wop group the Halos. Sabu was the uncle of new jack swing/R&B singer Keith Sweat.

Steve Adorno has since become the drummer and bandleader of Fania recording artist Seguida, and SMI recording artist Devoshun. He is also a composer/producer with his own music label Onroda MusicWorks. He has composed music scores for two Off-Broadway plays, music scores for Nintendo video games, and two independent films.

GQ-percussionist Kevin Zambrana has since become a trusted associate to Mr-Q as President of ZPI Productions NYC.

Group frontman/primary songwriter Emanuel LeBlanc later signed with Capitol Records and recorded a solo album, Always Be Around, which was released in 1991. He still tours as GQ, and is widely known as "Mr. Q," an in-name tribute to the band. In 1999, "Mr. Q" (as a solo performer), recorded a covers album A Tribute to Marvin Gaye and Billy Stewart.

Keith "Sabu" Crier (born November 15, 1954) died in the Bronx, New York on September 29, 2013, at age 58.

== Members ==
- Emanuel Rahiem LeBlanc
- Keith "Sabu" Crier (died 2013)
- Herb Lane
- Paul Service (1978–1980)
- Steve Adorno (1980–2010)
- Kevin J. Zambrana (1980–1982)

== Discography ==
=== Albums ===
| Year | Title | Label | Peak chart positions | |
| Year | Title | Label | US R&B | US Pop |
|---|---|---|---|---|
| 1976 | Soul On Your Side (as the Rhythm Makers) | Vigor Records | — | — |
| 1979 | Disco Nights | Arista Records | 2 | 13 |
| 1980 | GQ Two | Arista Records | 9 | 46 |
| 1981 | Face to Face | Arista Records | 18 | 140 |

=== Singles ===
| Year | Title | Peak chart positions | | | | | Label | B-side | Album |
| Year | Title | US Pop | US Dance | US R&B | AUS | UK | Label | B-side | Album |
|---|---|---|---|---|---|---|---|---|---|
| 1976 | "Zone" (as the Rhythm Makers) | — | — | 92 | — | — | Vigor Records | "Prime Cut" | Soul on Your Side |
| 1979 | "Disco Nights (Rock-Freak)" | 12 | 3 | 1 | 97 | 42 | Arista Records | "Boogie Oogie Oogie" | Disco Nights |
| 1979 | "Make My Dreams a Reality" | — | — | 8 | — | — | Arista Records | "This Happy Feeling" | Disco Nights |
| 1979 | "I Do Love You" | 20 | — | 5 | — | — | Arista Records | "Make My Dreams a Reality" | Disco Nights |
| 1980 | "Standing Ovation" | — | 35 | 12 | — | — | Arista Records | "Reasons for the Seasons" | Two |
| 1980 | "Sitting in the Park" | 101 | — | 9 | — | — | Arista Records | "It's Like That" | Two |
| 1980 | "G.Q. Down" | — | — | — | — | — | Arista Records | "It's Like That" | Two |
| 1980 | "Someday (In Your Life)" | — | — | — | — | — | Arista Records | "Don't Stop This Feeling" | Two |
| 1981 | "Shake" | — | — | 23 | — | — | Arista Records | "Face to Face" | Face to Face |
| 1982 | "Sad Girl" | 93 | — | 39 | — | — | Arista Records | "Shy Baby" | Face to Face |
| 1982 | "Try Smurfin'" | — | — | — | — | — | Arista Records | "Try Smurfin'" (instrumental) | Non-album singles |
| 1984 | "You Are the One for Me" | — | — | — | — | — | Stadium Records | "You Are the One for Me" (dub version) | Non-album singles |
"—" denotes releases that did not chart.
