= Billy Stewart =

American R&B singer and pianist (1937–1970)

Background information
- Born: William Larry Stewart II; March 24, 1937; Washington, D.C., U.S.
- Died: January 17, 1970 (aged 32) Smithfield, North Carolina, U.S.
- Genres: R&B; Chicago soul; northern soul
- Occupations: Singer, musicians
- Instruments: Vocals, piano, drums
- Years active: 1955–1970
- Labels: Chess Records; Okeh Records

William Larry Stewart II (March 24, 1937 – January 17, 1970) was an American R&B singer and pianist popular during the 1960s.

== Career ==
Stewart was 12 when he began singing with his younger brothers Johnny, James, and Frank as the Four Stewart Brothers. They later had their own radio show every Sunday for five years at WUST in Washington, D.C. He was a graduate of Armstrong High School, now Friendship Armstrong Academy in the city.

Billy Stewart made the transition to secular music by filling in occasionally for the Rainbows, a Washington D.C. area vocal group led by the future soul star, Don Covay. Through the Rainbows that Stewart met Marvin Gaye, an aspiring singer. Rock and roller Bo Diddley is credited with discovering Stewart playing piano in D.C., and inviting him to be one of his backup musicians. By 1955, Stewart had a recording contract with Diddley's label, Chess Records and Diddley played guitar on Stewart's 1956 recording of "Billy's Blues". A strong seller in Los Angeles, "Billy's Blues" reached the sales top 25 in Variety magazine. Stewart switched to Okeh Records and recorded "Billy's Heartache", backed by the Marquees, a D.C. area group which featured Marvin Gaye.

Back at Chess in the early 1960s, Stewart began working with A&R man Billy Davis. He recorded a song called "Fat Boy" and then had additional success with his recordings of "Reap What You Sow" and "Strange Feeling", both making the Billboard Hot 100 and the Top 30 on the R&B charts. Major chart success was not far away and in 1965, Stewart recorded two self-written songs, "I Do Love You" (No. 6 R&B, No. 26 pop), which featured his brother Johnny Stewart as one of the backing vocalists with his partner James English, and "Sitting in the Park" (No. 4 R&B, No. 24 pop). Billy Stewart's idiosyncratic improvisational technique of doubling-up, scatting his words and trilling using his lips made his style unique in the 1960s.

In 1966, Stewart recorded the LP Unbelievable. The first single released from the album was Stewart's radical interpretation of the George Gershwin song, "Summertime", a Top 10 hit on both the pop and R&B charts. The next single was Stewart's cover version of Doris Day's hit "Secret Love", which reached the pop Top 30 and just missed the Top 10 on the R&B chart. He recorded throughout the remainder of the 1960s on Chess without major success. A weight problem worsened and he developed diabetes. Stewart suffered minor injuries in a motorcycle accident in 1969.

== Later life ==
Stewart's weight caused him several health problems, culminating in diabetes. Stewart died in a car accident in January 1970, at age 32. Stewart was driving a Ford Thunderbird and approached a bridge across the Neuse River near Smithfield, North Carolina (presumably on US 301, since I-95 had not yet been completed in the area at that time. I-95 terminated in Rocky Mount, North Carolina prior to 1973.) His car left the highway, ran along the median strip at a slight angle to the highway, struck the bridge abutment and plunged into the river, instantly killing Stewart and three passengers. The other victims were in Stewart's band: Norman P. Rich, 39, of Washington, D.C.; William Cathey, 27, from Charlotte; and Rico Hightower, 27, of Newark, New Jersey. The four musicians were driving to a nightclub show in Columbia, South Carolina at the time and the car had been purchased only 12 days. It had been driven only 1,400 miles before the accident occurred.

Stewart was buried in National Harmony Memorial Park in Landover, Maryland.

=== Lawsuit ===
Sarah Stewart, the executrix of his estate, sued Ford Motor Company on behalf of his estate, claiming that mechanical failure was the cause of the accident. Ford prevailed in the first trial, but on appeal the court ruled that the trial court's refusal to give the requested jury instructions was in error and ordered the case reversed and remanded. The case was then settled out of court.

== Musical legacy ==
During the late 1970s and early 1980s, Billy Stewart's music was popular among Latino, specifically Chicano youth on the West Coast. He was inducted into the Washington D.C. Area Music Association Hall of Fame in 2002. His version of "Summertime" was one of the songs featured on Bob Dylan's Theme Time Radio Hour show. He was one of the few artists to which Dylan actually referenced during his mainly fictitious email responses to listener questions in a Q&A. His version of "Summertime" was also featured in the last scene and on the soundtrack of Stuck on You (2003). His musical legacy is kept alive by several talented family members in his hometown of Washington D.C. Cousins Grace Ruffin, who is a member of the '60s group The Four Jewels, and singer-musician Calvin C. Ruffin Jr., as well as D.C., independent recording artist Dane Riley, perform several of his hits during their concerts.

NRBQ has performed "Sitting in the Park" as a fluctuating part of their set list since 1970. Three versions have been released by NRBQ on CD. In Quentin Tarantino's Once Upon a Time in Hollywood, Stewart's "Summertime" is featured in a scene where Brad Pitt's character, Cliff Booth, leaves his home and drives erratically into the twilight. Stewart was inducted as part of the class of 2021 into the National Rhythm & Blues Hall of Fame.

== Discography ==
=== Studio albums ===
Year	Title	Peak chart positions		Record label
Year	Title	US	US R&B	Record label
1965	I Do Love You	97	2	Chess Records
1966	Unbelievable	138	7	Chess Records
1967	Billy Stewart Teaches Old Standards New Tricks	—	—	Chess Records
1974	Cross My Heart (posthumous release)	—	—	Chess Records
"—" denotes releases that did not chart

=== Compilation albums ===
- Remembered (Chess, 1970)
- The Greatest Sides (Chess/Checker Records, 1982)
- Greatest Hits (Evergreen, 1988)
- One More Time – The Chess Years (Chess, 1990)
- The Collection (Connoisseur Collection, 2001)

=== Singles ===
Year	Title	Peak chart positions			Album
Year	Title	US	US R&B	UK	Album
1956	"Billy's Blues"	—	—	—	Non-album singles
1957	"Strange Feeling"	—	—	—	Non-album singles
1962	"Reap What You Sow"	79	18	—	I Do Love You
1963	"Strange Feeling"	70	25	—	I Do Love You
1965	"I Do Love You"	26	6	―	I Do Love You
1965	"Sitting in the Park"	24	4	—	I Do Love You
1965	"How Nice It Is"	97	―	—	Cross My Heart
1966	"Mountain of Love"	100	—	—	Non-album singles
1966	"Because I Love You"	96	―	―	Non-album singles
1966	"Love Me"	—	38	―	Non-album singles
1966	"Summertime"	10	7	39	Unbelievable
1966	"Secret Love"	29	11	―	Billy Stewart Teaches Old Standards New Tricks
1967	"Every Day I Have the Blues"	74	41	―	Billy Stewart Teaches Old Standards New Tricks
1967	"Why (Do I Love You So)"	—	49	―	Cross My Heart
1968	"Cross My Heart"	86	34	―	Cross My Heart
1968	"Tell Me the Truth"	―	48	―	Cross My Heart
1969	"By the Time I Get to Phoenix"	―	―	―	Cross My Heart
"—" denotes releases that did not chart.
