= List of Billboard Hot 100 top-ten singles in 1979 =

This is a list of singles that have peaked in the Top 10 of the Billboard Hot 100 during 1979.

Donna Summer scored five top ten hits during the year with "Heaven Knows", "Hot Stuff", "Bad Girls", "Dim All the Lights", and "No More Tears (Enough Is Enough)", the most among all other artists.

== Top-ten singles ==
- (#) – 1979 Year-end top 10 single position and rank

List of Billboard Hot 100 top ten singles which peaked in 1979
Top ten entry date	Single	Artist(s)	Peak	Peak date	Weeks in top ten
Singles from 1978
December 2	"My Life"	Billy Joel	3	January 6	10
December 2	"Sharing the Night Together"	Dr. Hook	6	January 6	7
December 16	"Too Much Heaven"	Bee Gees	1	January 6	9
December 23	"Y.M.C.A." (#8)	Village People	2	February 3	12
December 23	"Hold the Line"	Toto	5	January 13	6
Singles from 1979
January 6	"Ooh Baby Baby"	Linda Ronstadt	7	January 20	4
January 13	"Promises"	Eric Clapton	9	January 20	2
January 20	"Da Ya Think I'm Sexy?" (#4)	Rod Stewart	1	February 10	12
January 20	"A Little More Love"	Olivia Newton-John	3	February 17	10
January 27	"Every 1's a Winner"	Hot Chocolate	6	February 10	4
January 27	"September"	Earth, Wind & Fire	8	February 10	3
February 3	"I Will Survive" (#6)	Gloria Gaynor	1	March 10	13
February 3	"Fire"	The Pointer Sisters	2	February 24	8
February 10	"Lotta Love"	Nicolette Larson	8	February 17	4
February 17	"Somewhere in the Night"	Barry Manilow	9	February 17	2
February 17	"I Was Made for Dancin'"	Leif Garrett	10	February 17	2
February 24	"Tragedy"	Bee Gees	1	March 24	9
March 3	"What a Fool Believes"	The Doobie Brothers	1	April 14	9
March 3	"Heaven Knows"	Donna Summer with Brooklyn Dreams	4	March 17	5
March 10	"Sultans of Swing"	Dire Straits	4	April 7	7
March 10	"Shake Your Groove Thing"	Peaches & Herb	5	March 17	5
March 17	"What You Won't Do for Love"	Bobby Caldwell	9	March 24	3
March 31	"Knock on Wood"	Amii Stewart	1	April 21	6
March 31	"Don't Cry Out Loud"	Melissa Manchester	10	March 31	1
April 7	"Heart of Glass"	Blondie	1	April 28	7
April 7	"Music Box Dancer"	Frank Mills	3	May 5	5
April 7	"Lady"	Little River Band	10	April 7	2
April 14	"Reunited" (#5)	Peaches & Herb	1	May 5	10
April 14	"Stumblin' In"	Suzi Quatro and Chris Norman	4	May 12	7
April 21	"I Want Your Love"	Chic	7	May 5	4
April 28	"In the Navy"	Village People	3	May 19	6
April 28	"Goodnight Tonight"	Wings	5	May 19	6
May 5	"Take Me Home"	Cher	8	May 12	3
May 5	"He's the Greatest Dancer"	Sister Sledge	9	May 12	3
May 12	"Hot Stuff" (#7)	Donna Summer	1	June 2	14
May 12	"Shake Your Body (Down to the Ground)"	The Jacksons	7	May 19	5
May 19	"Love You Inside Out"	Bee Gees	1	June 9	5
May 26	"We Are Family"	Sister Sledge	2	June 16	7
May 26	"Just When I Needed You Most"	Randy VanWarmer	4	June 16	6
May 26	"Love Is the Answer"	England Dan & John Ford Coley	10	May 26	2
June 2	"The Logical Song"	Supertramp	6	June 16	6
June 9	"Ring My Bell" (#9)	Anita Ward	1	June 30	11
June 9	"Chuck E.'s In Love"	Rickie Lee Jones	4	July 7	6
June 9	"She Believes in Me"	Kenny Rogers	5	July 7	7
June 16	"Boogie Wonderland"	Earth, Wind & Fire with The Emotions	6	July 14	6
June 23	"Bad Girls" (#2)	Donna Summer	1	July 14	10
June 23	"You Take My Breath Away"	Rex Smith	10	June 23	2
July 7	"Makin' It"	David Naughton	5	July 21	6
July 7	"I Want You to Want Me"	Cheap Trick	7	July 21	5
July 14	"Gold"	John Stewart	5	August 4	5
July 14	"Shine a Little Love"	Electric Light Orchestra	8	July 21	3
July 21	"Good Times"	Chic	1	August 18	9
July 28	"The Main Event/Fight"	Barbra Streisand	3	August 11	7
July 28	"When You're in Love with a Beautiful Woman"	Dr. Hook	6	August 11	4
August 4	"My Sharona" (#1)	The Knack	1	August 25	12
August 11	"You Can't Change That"	Raydio	9	August 18	2
August 18	"After the Love Has Gone"	Earth, Wind & Fire	2	September 15	9
August 18	"The Devil Went Down to Georgia"	Charlie Daniels	3	September 15	7
August 18	"Mama Can't Buy You Love"	Elton John	9	August 25	3
August 25	"Sad Eyes" (#10)	Robert John	1	October 6	9
August 25	"Don't Bring Me Down"	Electric Light Orchestra	4	September 8	6
August 25	"Lead Me On"	Maxine Nightingale	5	September 15	5
September 1	"I'll Never Love This Way Again"	Dionne Warwick	5	October 20	9
September 8	"Lonesome Loser"	Little River Band	6	September 29	6
September 15	"Sail On"	Commodores	4	October 13	7
September 22	"Rise"	Herb Alpert	1	October 20	9
September 29	"Don't Stop 'Til You Get Enough"	Michael Jackson	1	October 13	6
October 6	"Pop Muzik"	M	1	November 3	9
October 6	"Dim All the Lights"	Donna Summer	2	November 10	9
October 20	"Heartache Tonight"	Eagles	1	November 10	9
October 20	"Still"	Commodores	1	November 17	13
October 27	"You Decorated My Life"	Kenny Rogers	7	November 17	5
October 27	"Tusk"	Fleetwood Mac	8	November 3	5
November 3	"No More Tears (Enough Is Enough)"	Barbra Streisand and Donna Summer	1	November 24	9
November 3	"Babe"	Styx	1	December 8	11
November 24	"Send One Your Love"	Stevie Wonder	4	December 22	10
December 1	"Escape (The Piña Colada Song)"	Rupert Holmes	1	December 22	10
December 1	"Ships"	Barry Manilow	9	December 1	2
December 8	"You're Only Lonely"	JD Souther	7	December 15	4
December 15	"Take the Long Way Home"	Supertramp	10	December 15	3

=== 1978 peaks ===
List of Billboard Hot 100 top ten singles in 1979 which peaked in 1978
Top ten entry date	Single	Artist(s)	Peak	Peak date	Weeks in top ten
November 18	"You Don't Bring Me Flowers"	Neil Diamond and Barbra Streisand	1	December 2	10
November 25	"Le Freak" (#3)	Chic	1	December 9	15
November 25	"I Love the Nightlife"	Alicia Bridges	5	December 23	7
December 9	"(Our Love) Don't Throw it All Away"	Andy Gibb	9	December 16	6

=== 1980 peaks ===
List of Billboard Hot 100 top ten singles in 1979 which peaked in 1980
Top ten entry date	Single	Artist(s)	Peak	Peak date	Weeks in top ten
November 10	"Please Don't Go"	KC and the Sunshine Band	1	January 5	11
December 8	"Do That to Me One More Time"	Captain & Tennille	1	February 16	14
December 22	"Ladies' Night"	Kool & the Gang	8	January 12	5

== See also ==
- 1979 in music
- List of Billboard Hot 100 number ones of 1979
- Billboard Year-End Hot 100 singles of 1979
