= List of number-one singles of 1979 (Canada) =

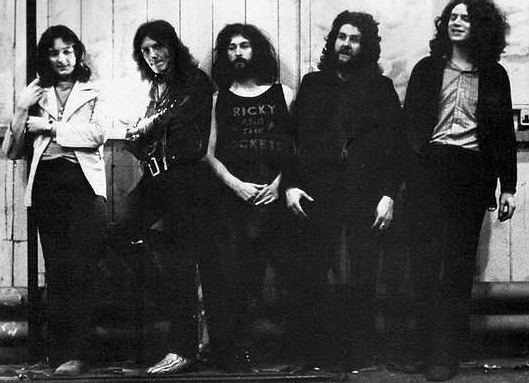
British progressive rock band Supertramp scored the Canada number-one year-end hit of 1979 with "The Logical Song".

RPM was a Canadian music magazine that published the best-performing singles chart in Canada from 1964 to 2000. In 1979, twenty-eight singles reached number one in Canada. The first number one single was from Canadian singer-songwriter Gino Vannelli, with "I Just Wanna Stop" which reached number one in December 1978, and the last was "Babe" from American rock band Styx. Twelve acts achieved their first number-one song in the chart in 1979: the Village People, Amii Stewart, Blondie, Peaches & Herb, Supertramp, Sister Sledge, Anita Ward, The Knack, Patrick Hernandez, Robert Palmer, M and Styx; the Village People and The Knack would also score another number-one hit that year. The Bee Gees and Donna Summer would also have more than one new number-one song, having three and two singles respectively. Excluding Gino Vannelli, which charted in late December 1978, Anne Murray was the only Canadian act with at least one number-one song in the chart that year, with "I Just Fall in Love Again".

The best-performing single of the year was "The Logical Song" by the British progressive rock band Supertramp, which spent 28 weeks in the chart, including two weeks at number one. The longest-running number-one single is "Babe", which spent five weeks at number one throughout December 1979. The Bee Gees' "Tragedy", and Rod Stewart's "Da Ya Think I'm Sexy?" stayed at number one for four weeks each that year. The Bee Gees had the most weeks at number one, totalling seven weeks, and also had the most number-one singles, with three.

== Chart history ==
Key
The yellow background indicates the #1 song on RPM's Year-End Top 200 Singles of 1979.

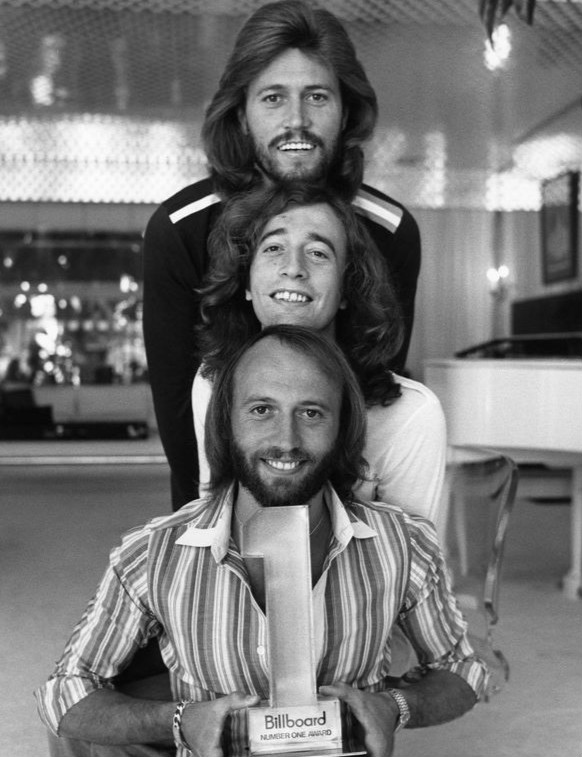
The Bee Gees had the most number-one hits in Canada in 1979, with "Too Much Heaven", "Tragedy" and "Love You Inside Out".

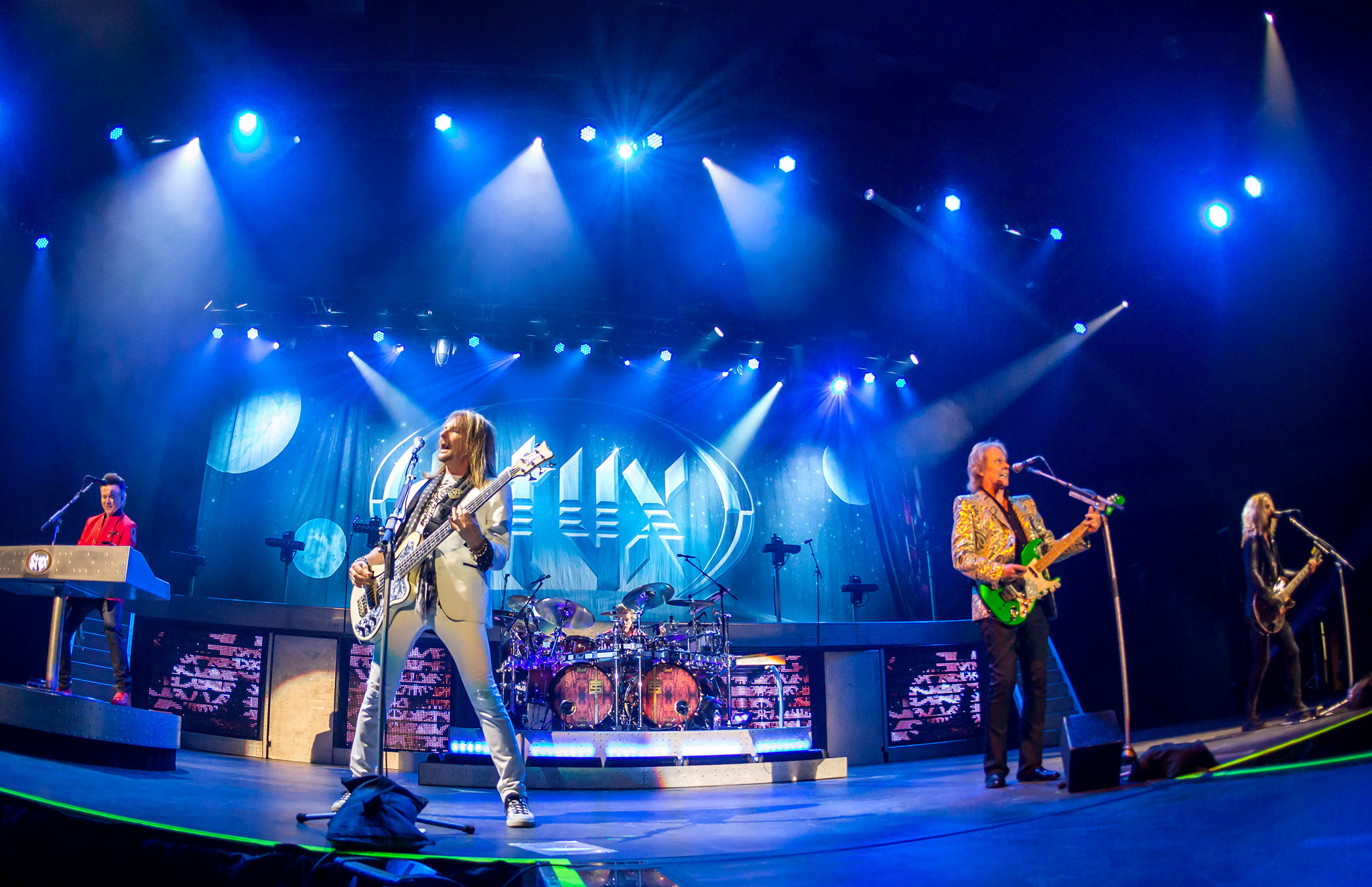
Styx (band pictured in 2017) spent five weeks at number one with the final number-one hit of the year, "Babe".

Chart history
Issue date	Title	Artist(s)	Ref.
January 6 (Note: Due to a week's break in publication for the 1978/1979 New Year period, the week of January 6 is inferred.)	"I Just Wanna Stop"	Gino Vannelli	
January 13	"Le Freak"	Chic	
January 20	"Too Much Heaven"	Bee Gees	
January 27	"Y.M.C.A."	Village People	
February 3	"Y.M.C.A."	Village People	
February 10	"Too Much Heaven"	Bee Gees	
February 17	"Too Much Heaven"	Bee Gees	
February 24	"Da Ya Think I'm Sexy?"	Rod Stewart	
March 3	"Da Ya Think I'm Sexy?"	Rod Stewart	
March 10	"Da Ya Think I'm Sexy?"	Rod Stewart	
March 17	"Da Ya Think I'm Sexy?"	Rod Stewart	
March 24	"Tragedy"	Bee Gees	
March 31	"Tragedy"	Bee Gees	
April 7	"Tragedy"	Bee Gees	
April 14	"Tragedy"	Bee Gees	
April 21	"I Just Fall in Love Again"	Anne Murray	
April 28	"What a Fool Believes"	The Doobie Brothers	
May 5	"Knock on Wood"	Amii Stewart	
May 12	"Heart of Glass"	Blondie	
May 19	"In the Navy"	Village People	
May 26	"Reunited"	Peaches & Herb	
June 2	"Reunited"	Peaches & Herb	
June 9	"Hot Stuff"	Donna Summer	
June 16	"Hot Stuff"	Donna Summer	
June 23	"Love You Inside Out"	Bee Gees	
June 30	"The Logical Song"	Supertramp	
July 7	"The Logical Song"	Supertramp	
July 14	"We Are Family"	Sister Sledge	
July 21	"We Are Family"	Sister Sledge	
July 28	"Ring My Bell"	Anita Ward	
August 4	"Ring My Bell"	Anita Ward	
August 11	"Bad Girls"	Donna Summer	
August 18	"Bad Girls"	Donna Summer	
August 25	"Born to Be Alive"	Patrick Hernandez	
September 1	"Born to Be Alive"	Patrick Hernandez	
September 8	"My Sharona"	The Knack	
September 15	"My Sharona"	The Knack	
September 22	"My Sharona"	The Knack	
September 29	"I Was Made for Lovin' You"	Kiss	
October 6	"Don't Bring Me Down"	Electric Light Orchestra	
October 13	"Bad Case of Loving You (Doctor, Doctor)"	Robert Palmer	
October 20	"Bad Case of Loving You (Doctor, Doctor)"	Robert Palmer	
October 28	"Pop Muzik"	M	
November 3	"Pop Muzik"	M	
November 10	"Good Girls Don't"	The Knack	
November 17	"Heartache Tonight"	Eagles	
November 24	"Heartache Tonight"	Eagles	
December 1	"Babe"	Styx	
December 8	"Babe"	Styx	
December 15	"Babe"	Styx	
December 22	"Babe"	Styx	
December 29	"Babe"	Styx	

== See also ==
- List of RPM number-one adult contemporary singles of 1979
- List of RPM number-one country singles of 1979
- List of RPM number-one dance singles of 1979
- List of Billboard Hot 100 number ones of 1979
- List of Cashbox Top 100 number-one singles of 1979
- List of Canadian number-one albums of 1979
