= List of Billboard number-one disco singles of 1979 =

The National Disco Action Top 40 was a chart published weekly by Billboard magazine in the United States, which ranked the popularity of disco singles in nightclubs across the country, based on a national survey of club disc jockeys. Adjusted multiple times during 1979, the chart expanded to 60 positions on April 7, and was renamed the Disco Top 80 on April 14. The chart was further extended as the Disco Top 100 on September 8.

== Chart history ==
Issue date	Song	Artist
January 6	"Le Freak"/ "I Want Your Love"/ "Chic Cheer"	Chic
January 13	"Contact"	Edwin Starr
January 20	Fly Away (all cuts)	Voyage
January 27	"I Will Survive"/ "Substitute"/ "Anybody Wanna Party?"/ "I Said Yes"	Gloria Gaynor
February 3	"I Will Survive"/ "Substitute"/ "Anybody Wanna Party?"/ "I Said Yes"	Gloria Gaynor
February 10	"I Will Survive"/ "Substitute"/ "Anybody Wanna Party?"/ "I Said Yes"	Gloria Gaynor
February 17	"Keep on Dancin'"/ "Do It at the Disco"/ "Let's Lovedance Tonight"	Gary's Gang
February 24	"Da Ya Think I'm Sexy?"	Rod Stewart
March 3	"Da Ya Think I'm Sexy?"	Rod Stewart
March 10	"Da Ya Think I'm Sexy?"	Rod Stewart
March 17	"I Got My Mind Made Up (You Can Get It Girl)"	Instant Funk
March 24	"We Are Family"/ "He's the Greatest Dancer"/ "Lost in Music"	Sister Sledge
March 31	"We Are Family"/ "He's the Greatest Dancer"/ "Lost in Music"	Sister Sledge
April 7	"Dancer"/ "Dance to Dance"	Gino Soccio
April 14	"Dancer"/ "Dance to Dance"	Gino Soccio
April 21	"Dancer"/ "Dance to Dance"	Gino Soccio
April 28	"Dancer"/ "Dance to Dance"	Gino Soccio
May 5	"Dancer"/ "Dance to Dance"	Gino Soccio
May 12	"Dancer"/ "Dance to Dance"	Gino Soccio
May 19	"Ring My Bell"	Anita Ward
May 26	Bad Girls (all cuts)	Donna Summer
June 2	Bad Girls (all cuts)	Donna Summer
June 9	Bad Girls (all cuts)	Donna Summer
June 16	Bad Girls (all cuts)	Donna Summer
June 23	Bad Girls (all cuts)	Donna Summer
June 30	Bad Girls (all cuts)	Donna Summer
July 7	Bad Girls (all cuts)	Donna Summer
July 14	"Born to Be Alive"	Patrick Hernandez
July 21	"Born to Be Alive"	Patrick Hernandez
July 28	"Born to Be Alive"	Patrick Hernandez
August 4	"I've Got the Next Dance"	Deniece Williams
August 11	"This Time Baby"	Jackie Moore
August 18	"Here Comes That Sound Again"	Love De-Luxe
August 25	The Boss (all cuts)	Diana Ross
September 1	The Boss (all cuts)	Diana Ross
September 8	"Found a Cure"/ "Stay Free"/ "Nobody Knows"	Ashford & Simpson
September 15	"Found a Cure"/ "Stay Free"/ "Nobody Knows"	Ashford & Simpson
September 22	"Come to Me"/ "Don't Stop Dancing"/ "Playboy"	France Joli
September 29	"Come to Me"/ "Don't Stop Dancing"/ "Playboy"	France Joli
October 6	"Come to Me"/ "Don't Stop Dancing"/ "Playboy"	France Joli
October 13	"Move On Up"/ "Up Up Up"/ "Destination's Theme"	Destination
October 20	"Move On Up"/ "Up Up Up"/ "Destination's Theme"	Destination
October 27	"Move On Up"/ "Up Up Up"/ "Destination's Theme"	Destination
November 3	"Move On Up"/ "Up Up Up"/ "Destination's Theme"	Destination
November 10	"Harmony"/ "Ooh, La La"	Suzi Lane
November 17	"Beat of the Night"/ "Pump It Up"	Fever
November 24	"No More Tears (Enough Is Enough)"	Barbra Streisand and Donna Summer
December 1	"No More Tears (Enough Is Enough)"	Barbra Streisand and Donna Summer
December 8	"No More Tears (Enough Is Enough)"	Barbra Streisand and Donna Summer
December 15	"No More Tears (Enough Is Enough)"	Barbra Streisand and Donna Summer
December 22	"Deputy of Love"	Don Armando's Second Avenue Rhumba Band
December 29	"Deputy of Love"	Don Armando's Second Avenue Rhumba Band

== See also ==
- 1979 in music
- List of Billboard Hot 100 number ones of 1979
