= List of Hot Soul Singles number ones of 1979 =

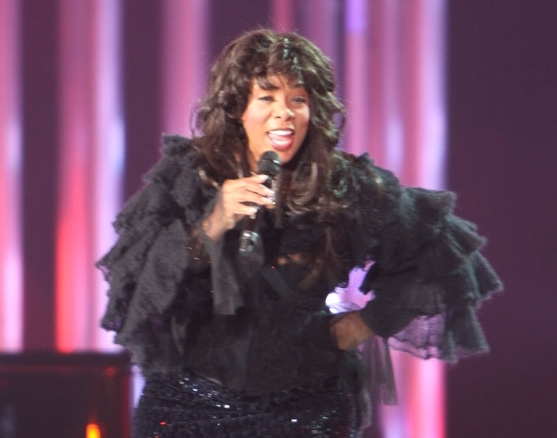
"Bad Girls" was the first number one for Donna Summer (pictured in later life).

Billboard published a weekly chart in 1979 ranking the top-performing singles in the United States in soul music and related African American-oriented genres; the chart has undergone various name changes over the decades to reflect the evolution of black music and has been published as Hot R&B/Hip-Hop Songs since 2005. In 1979, it was published under the title Hot Soul Singles, and 20 different singles reached number one.

In September, Michael Jackson gained his first soul chart-topper as a solo artist with "Don't Stop 'Til You Get Enough". The singer had previously achieved several soul number ones with his brothers as the Jackson 5 and had charted sporadically in his own right since 1971, but did not reach the top spot as a soloist until 1979. Jackson would go on to become one of the most successful musicians of all time, selling hundreds of millions of records, and be regarded as one of the greatest ever entertainers. Donna Summer also topped the soul listing for the first time in July with "Bad Girls". Known as the "Queen of Disco", she had previously achieved five chart-toppers on the Disco Action chart. In December, "I Wanna Be Your Lover" gave Prince his first number one, the first major success of a career which would take him to superstar status and see him regarded as one of the most innovative and influential musicians of his generation. Eight other acts reached number one for the first time in their respective careers in 1979: Cheryl Lynn, Chuck Brown & the Soul Searchers, Instant Funk, Sister Sledge, GQ, Peaches & Herb, Anita Ward, and McFadden & Whitehead. Ward's single "Ring My Bell" was an international success, topping the all-genre Hot 100 chart and also reaching number one in the United Kingdom, but she would not be able to replicate its success and is regarded as a one-hit wonder.

Sister Sledge was the only act to have multiple soul number ones during the year, topping the chart with "He's the Greatest Dancer" in March and "We Are Family" in June, but these would prove to be the only chart-toppers for the sibling act. The year's longest-running number one was "Good Times" by Chic, which spent six consecutive weeks in the top spot and was ranked by Billboard as the year's top soul song. The year's final chart-topper was "Do You Love What You Feel" by Rufus and Chaka (Chaka Khan), which reached the top spot in the issue dated December 15 and stayed there for the remainder of the year. Khan had achieved her first solo number one the previous year but continued to record sporadically with the band alongside her ongoing solo career.

== Chart history ==
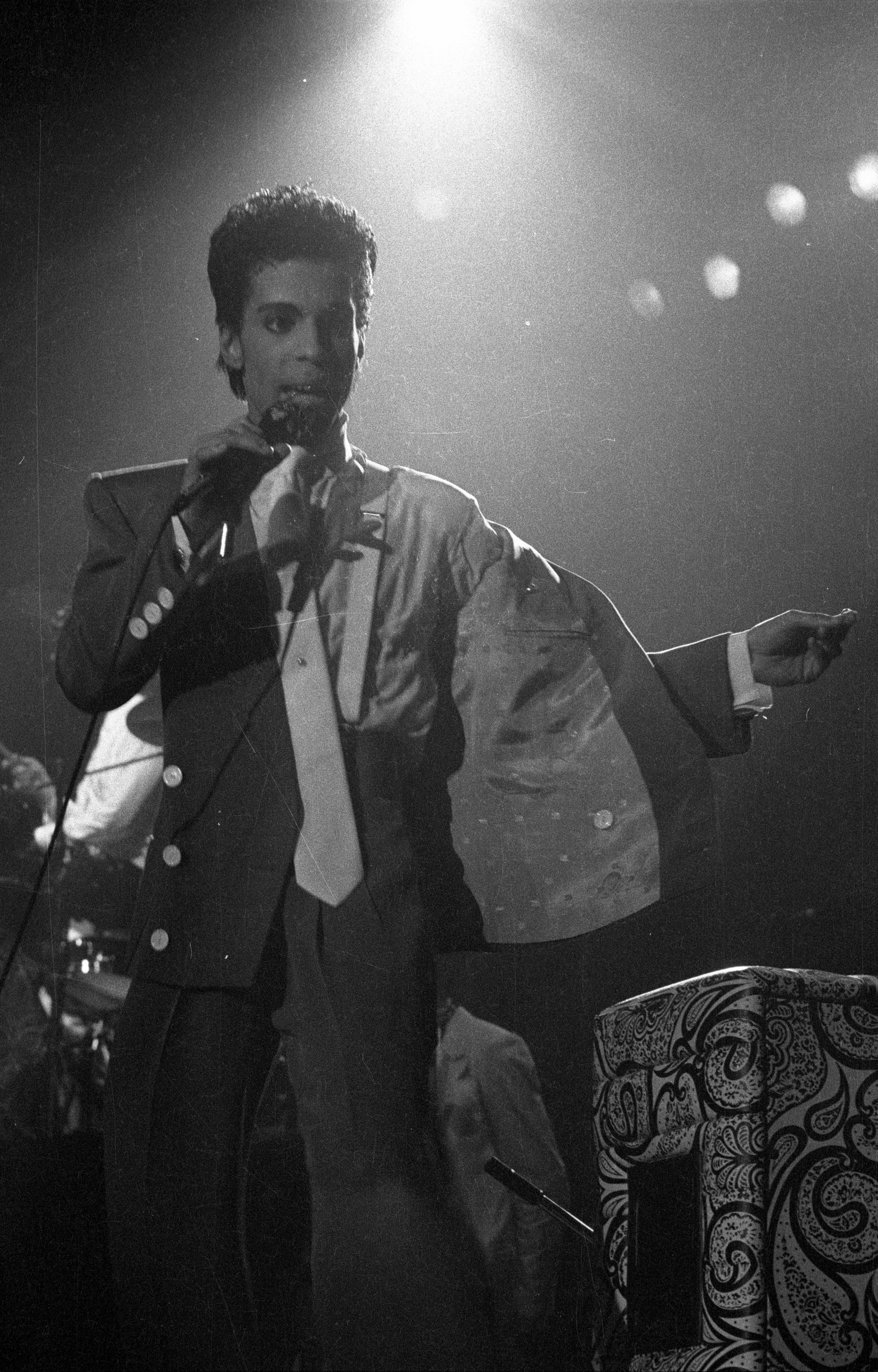
Prince had his first soul number one in 1979. He went on to be regarded as one of the greatest musicians of his generation.

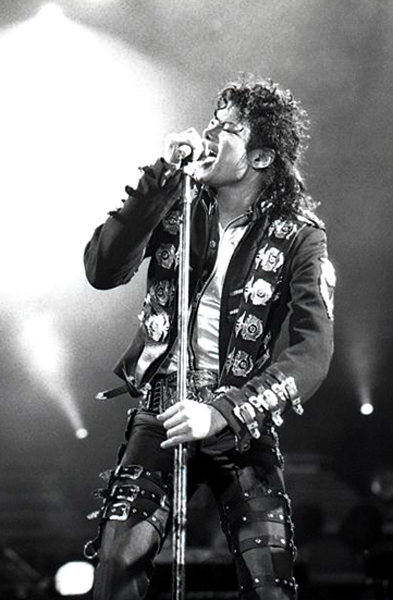
Michael Jackson, one of the most successful and celebrated artists of all time, had his first solo chart-topper in 1979.

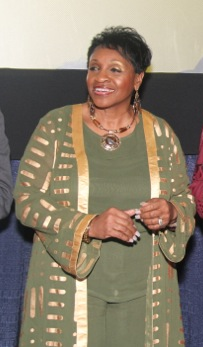
Anita Ward (pictured in later life) topped the chart with "Ring My Bell" but she failed to achieve further success and is generally regarded as a one-hit wonder.

Key
†	Indicates number 1 on Billboard's year-end soul chart

Chart history
Issue date	Title	Artist(s)	Ref.
January 6	"Got to Be Real"	Cheryl Lynn	
January 13	"September"	Earth, Wind & Fire	
January 20	"Aqua Boogie (A Psychoalphadiscobetabioaquadoloop)"	Parliament	
January 27	"Aqua Boogie (A Psychoalphadiscobetabioaquadoloop)"	Parliament	
February 3	"Aqua Boogie (A Psychoalphadiscobetabioaquadoloop)"	Parliament	
February 10	"Aqua Boogie (A Psychoalphadiscobetabioaquadoloop)"	Parliament	
February 17	"Bustin' Loose (Part 1)"	Chuck Brown & the Soul Searchers	
February 24	"Bustin' Loose (Part 1)"	Chuck Brown & the Soul Searchers	
March 3	"Bustin' Loose (Part 1)"	Chuck Brown & the Soul Searchers	
March 10	"Bustin' Loose (Part 1)"	Chuck Brown & the Soul Searchers	
March 17	"I Got My Mind Made Up (You Can Get It Girl)"	Instant Funk	
March 24	"I Got My Mind Made Up (You Can Get It Girl)"	Instant Funk	
March 31	"He's the Greatest Dancer"	Sister Sledge	
April 7	"I Got My Mind Made Up (You Can Get It Girl)"	Instant Funk	
April 14	"Disco Nights (Rock-Freak)"	GQ	
April 21	"Disco Nights (Rock-Freak)"	GQ	
April 28	"Reunited"	Peaches & Herb	
May 5	"Reunited"	Peaches & Herb	
May 12	"Reunited"	Peaches & Herb	
May 19	"Reunited"	Peaches & Herb	
May 26	"I Wanna Be With You (Part 1)"	The Isley Brothers	
June 2	"Ain't No Stoppin' Us Now"	McFadden & Whitehead	
June 9	"We Are Family"	Sister Sledge	
June 16	"Ring My Bell"	Anita Ward	
June 23	"Ring My Bell"	Anita Ward	
June 30	"Ring My Bell"	Anita Ward	
July 7	"Ring My Bell"	Anita Ward	
July 14	"Ring My Bell"	Anita Ward	
July 21	"Bad Girls"	Donna Summer	
July 28	"Good Times" †	Chic	
August 4	"Good Times" †	Chic	
August 11	"Good Times" †	Chic	
August 18	"Good Times" †	Chic	
August 25	"Good Times" †	Chic	
September 1	"Good Times" †	Chic	
September 8	"Don't Stop 'Til You Get Enough"	Michael Jackson	
September 15	"Don't Stop 'Til You Get Enough"	Michael Jackson	
September 22	"Don't Stop 'Til You Get Enough"	Michael Jackson	
September 29	"Don't Stop 'Til You Get Enough"	Michael Jackson	
October 6	"Don't Stop 'Til You Get Enough"	Michael Jackson	
October 13	"(Not Just) Knee Deep (Part 1)"	Funkadelic	
October 20	"(Not Just) Knee Deep (Part 1)"	Funkadelic	
October 27	"(Not Just) Knee Deep (Part 1)"	Funkadelic	
November 3	"Ladies' Night"	Kool & the Gang	
November 10	"Ladies' Night"	Kool & the Gang	
November 17	"Ladies' Night"	Kool & the Gang	
November 24	"Still"	Commodores	
December 1	"I Wanna Be Your Lover"	Prince	
December 8	"I Wanna Be Your Lover"	Prince	
December 15	"Do You Love What You Feel"	Rufus and Chaka	
December 22	"Do You Love What You Feel"	Rufus and Chaka	
December 29	"Do You Love What You Feel"	Rufus and Chaka	

== See also ==
- Billboard Year-End Hot Soul Singles of 1979
- List of Billboard Hot 100 number-one singles of 1979
