= Hot Stuff (Donna Summer song) =

1979 song by Donna Summer

- Italian picture sleeve

Single by Donna Summer

from the album Bad Girls
- B-side: "Journey to the Centre of Your Heart"
- Released: April 13, 1979
- Studio: Rusk Sound (Los Angeles, California)
- Genre: Disco; rock
- Length: 5:13 (album version); 3:47 (radio edit)
- Label: Casablanca
- Songwriters: Pete Bellotte; Harold Faltermeyer; Keith Forsey
- Producers: Giorgio Moroder; Pete Bellotte

Donna Summer singles chronology
"Heaven Knows" (1978)	"Hot Stuff" (1979)	"Bad Girls" (1979)

Audio
- "Hot Stuff" on YouTube

"Hot Stuff" is a song written by Pete Bellotte, Harold Faltermeyer, and Keith Forsey, released as the lead single from American singer Donna Summer's seventh studio album, Bad Girls. The song was produced by English producer Pete Bellotte and Italian producer Giorgio Moroder, and it was released in 1979 through Casablanca Records. Up to that point, Summer had mainly been associated with disco songs but this song also showed a significant rock direction, including a guitar solo by ex-Doobie Brother and Steely Dan guitarist Jeff "Skunk" Baxter. It is the second of four songs by Summer to reach number one on the Billboard Hot 100.

In 2018, a remix by Ralphi Rosario and Erick Ibiza entitled "Hot Stuff 2018" went to number one on the US Dance Club Songs chart.

== Reception ==
Billboard claimed that "Hot Stuff" has a "strong R&B, soulish feel" along with a "fiery" vocal performance from Summer. Cash Box said that the song "has an exciting newness to its rock/disco sound" with "power guitar chording, interesting synthesizer lines and unusual Summer vocal." Record World called it a "splendid rock disco tune."

== Awards and legacy ==
"Hot Stuff" won Summer the Grammy Award for Best Female Rock Vocal Performance in the inaugural year the award was given out.

In 2010, the song was ranked No. 104 on Rolling Stone's list of "The 500 Greatest Songs of All Time".

== Chart performance ==
"Hot Stuff" was certified Platinum by the RIAA and remained at number one on the Billboard Hot 100 chart for three non-consecutive weeks, and spent the longest time in the top ten in 1979: fourteen weeks. The song also topped the US Dance Club Songs chart, with Summer's follow-up "Bad Girls" as a double A-side. "Hot Stuff" was the seventh biggest song of 1979 in the US. The popular 12" single edition of the song plays the full 6:47 version of the song and then segues into "Bad Girls" 4:55 version.

== Charts ==
=== Weekly charts ===
Chart (1979–1980)	Peak position
Australia (Kent Music Report)	1
Austria (Ö3 Austria Top 40)	3
Belgium (Ultratop 50 Flanders)	8
Canada Adult Contemporary (RPM)	1
Canada Dance/Urban (RPM)	1
Canada Top Singles (RPM)	1
Ecuador (Radio Vision)	1
Finland (Suomen virallinen lista)	7
France (IFOP)	10
Ireland (IRMA)	14
Italy (Musica e dischi)	2
Japan (Oricon International Chart)	1
Japan (Oricon Singles Chart)	17
Netherlands (Dutch Top 40)	14
Netherlands (Single Top 100)	21
New Zealand (Recorded Music NZ)	7
Norway (VG-lista)	2
Spain (AFYVE)	14
Sweden (Sverigetopplistan)	2
Switzerland (Schweizer Hitparade)	1
UK Singles (Official Charts)	11
US Billboard Hot 100	1
US Disco Top 80 (Billboard) with "Bad Girls"	1
US Hot Soul Singles (Billboard)	3
US Cash Box Top 100	1
US Record World Singles	1
West Germany (GfK)	5

Chart (2012)	Peak position
France (SNEP)	47
Japan (Japan Hot 100)	31
Netherlands (Single Top 100)	93
Switzerland (Schweizer Hitparade)	65
UK Singles (OCC)	111

=== Year-end charts ===
Chart (1979)	Rank
Australia (Kent Music Report)	17
Austria (Ö3 Austria Top 40)	13
Belgium (Ultratop 50 Flanders)	55
Canada Top Singles (RPM)	18
France (IFOP)	42
Switzerland (Schweizer Hitparade)	14
US Billboard Hot 100	7
US Cash Box Top 100	14
West Germany (Media Control)	17

=== All-time charts ===
Chart (1958–2018)	Position
US Billboard Hot 100	87

=== Sales and certifications ===
Region	Certification	Certified units/sales
Canada (Music Canada)	Platinum	150,000^{^}
Italy (FIMI) sales since 2009	Gold	35,000^{‡}
New Zealand (RMNZ)	Platinum	30,000^{‡}
United Kingdom (BPI)	Gold	400,000^{‡}
United States (RIAA)	Platinum	2,000,000^{^}
^{^} Shipments figures based on certification alone.^{‡} Sales+streaming figures based on certification alone.

== The Pussycat Dolls version ==
American dance troupe The Pussycat Dolls used elements of the song on "Hot Stuff (I Want You Back)", which appears on their 2005 debut album PCD.

== EliZe version ==
Dutch pop singer EliZe released a cover in September 2008, which peaked at no. 11 on the Dutch charts.

Chart (2008)	Peak position
Netherlands (Dutch Top 40)	27
Netherlands (Single Top 100)	11

== Kygo version ==
"Hot Stuff"

Single by Kygo and Donna Summer
- Released: September 18, 2020
- Genre: Dance
- Length: 3:19
- Label: Sony
- Songwriters: Harold Faltermeyer; Keith Forsey; Pete Bellotte
- Producer: Kygo

Kygo singles chronology
"What's Love Got to Do with It" (2020)	"Hot Stuff" (2020)	"Gone Are the Days" (2021)

Donna Summer singles chronology
"Hot Stuff 2018" (2018)	"Hot Stuff" (2020)

Music video
- "Hot Stuff" on YouTube

On September 18, 2020, Norwegian DJ Kygo released a remixed version of the song. It marks Kygo's third remix, released as a single, following "Higher Love" (2019), and "What's Love Got to Do with It (song)" (2020).

=== Background ===
In a press release, Kygo noted that Summer was one of his favorite artists of all time because of her brilliant catalogue and unmatched vocals. He hoped that this version would continue to bring the joy that the original track did.

=== Music video ===
A music video to accompany the release of "Hot Stuff" was first released onto YouTube on September 17, 2020. The video is directed by Bo Webb, starring Outer Banks cast members Madelyn Cline and Chase Stokes. The music video details a blossoming love between the two as they dance the night away amidst blue and purple hues.

=== Personnel ===
Credits adapted from Tidal.

- Kygo – production
- Harold Faltermeyer – songwriting
- Keith Forsey – songwriting
- Pete Bellotte – songwriter
- Randy Merrill – master engineering
- Şerban Ghenea – mix engineering

=== Charts ===
==== Weekly charts ====
Weekly chart performance for "Hot Stuff"
Chart (2020–2021)	Peak position
Belgium (Ultratip Bubbling Under Flanders)	1
Belgium Dance (Ultratop Flanders)	21
Belgium (Ultratop 50 Wallonia)	7
Belgium Dance (Ultratop Wallonia)	2
Hot Canadian Digital Songs (Billboard)	24
CIS Airplay (TopHit)	156
Croatia International Airplay (HRT)	8
Euro Digital Song Sales (Billboard)	6
France (SNEP)	138
Global 200 (Billboard)	117
Germany (GfK)	74
Hungary (Rádiós Top 40)	25
Hungary (Single Top 40)	12
Iceland (Tónlistinn)	20
Mexico Airplay (Billboard)	26
Norway (VG-lista)	23
Romania (Airplay 100)	96
Slovakia (Rádio Top 100)	1
Sweden (Sverigetopplistan)	25
Switzerland (Schweizer Hitparade)	27
UK Singles Downloads (Official Charts)	37
US Digital Song Sales (Billboard)	18
US Hot Dance/Electronic Songs (Billboard)	9

2024 Weekly chart performance for "Hot Stuff"
Chart (2024)	Peak position
Romania Airplay (TopHit)	94

==== Year-end charts ====
Year-end chart performance for "Hot Stuff"
Chart (2020)	Position
US Hot Dance/Electronic Songs (Billboard)	83

Chart (2021)	Position
Belgium (Ultratop Wallonia)	42

== Appearances in other media ==
- Professional wrestler "Hot Stuff" Eddie Gilbert took his ring name from the song, which he also used as his entrance theme.
- The song was used in the 1997 film The Full Monty. During a press event on his 50th birthday, Charles, Prince of Wales helped recreate the scene in which the four main characters overhear the song while waiting in line at the unemployment office.
- The song is featured in the 2015 film The Martian, during a scene in which Matt Damon's character uses radioactive material to keep warm whilst stranded on Mars.
- Mexican pop star Lorena Herrera covered the song in Spanish renaming it "Algo prendido".
- The song is playable in the 2010 game Just Dance 2 and the 2011 game Dance Central 2.
- It is heard in multiple commercials.
- The song was used in Mafia!, a 1998 American crime comedy film directed by Jim Abrahams.
- The song is played at the conclusion of the Pop-Tarts Bowl, a college football bowl game sponsored by Kellanova, when the winning team feasts on what was advertised as an "edible mascot" as a result of winning the game.
- Dutch DJ duo, Vicetone remixed the song, released as "Hawt Stuff", on May 27, 2016.

== See also ==
- List of number-one singles in Australia during the 1970s
- List of Top 25 singles for 1979 in Australia
- Billboard Year-End Hot 100 singles of 1979
- List of Billboard Hot 100 top 10 singles in 1979
- List of Billboard Hot 100 number-one singles of 1979
- List of Cash Box Top 100 number-one singles of 1979
- List of number-one singles of 1979 (Canada)
- List of RPM number-one dance singles of 1979
- List of number-one singles from 1968 to 1979 (Switzerland)
- List of number-one dance singles of 1979 (U.S.)
- List of number-one dance singles of 2018 (U.S.)
