= List of Cash Box Top 100 number-one singles of 1979 =

These are the number-one hits on the Top 100 Singles chart in 1979 as published by Cash Box magazine.

Key
†	Indicates best-performing single of 1979

Issue date	Song	Artist
January 6	"Le Freak" †	Chic
January 13	"Le Freak" †	Chic
January 20	"Le Freak" †	Chic
January 27	"Le Freak" †	Chic
February 3	"Da Ya Think I'm Sexy?"	Rod Stewart
February 10	"Da Ya Think I'm Sexy?"	Rod Stewart
February 17	"Da Ya Think I'm Sexy?"	Rod Stewart
February 24	"Da Ya Think I'm Sexy?"	Rod Stewart
March 3	"Da Ya Think I'm Sexy?"	Rod Stewart
March 10	"I Will Survive"	Gloria Gaynor
March 17	"Tragedy"	Bee Gees
March 24	"Tragedy"	Bee Gees
March 31	"Tragedy"	Bee Gees
April 7	"What a Fool Believes"	Doobie Brothers
April 14	"What a Fool Believes"	Doobie Brothers
April 21	"Knock on Wood"	Amii Stewart
April 28	"Heart of Glass"	Blondie
May 5	"Reunited"	Peaches & Herb
May 12	"Reunited"	Peaches & Herb
May 19	"Reunited"	Peaches & Herb
May 26	"Reunited"	Peaches & Herb
June 2	"Hot Stuff"	Donna Summer
June 9	"Hot Stuff"	Donna Summer
June 16	"Hot Stuff"	Donna Summer
June 23	"Hot Stuff"	Donna Summer
June 30	"Ring My Bell"	Anita Ward
July 7	"Ring My Bell"	Anita Ward
July 14	"Ring My Bell"	Anita Ward
July 21	"Bad Girls"	Donna Summer
July 28	"Bad Girls"	Donna Summer
August 4	"Bad Girls"	Donna Summer
August 11	"Good Times"	Chic
August 18	"My Sharona"	The Knack
August 25	"My Sharona"	The Knack
September 1	"My Sharona"	The Knack
September 8	"My Sharona"	The Knack
September 15	"My Sharona"	The Knack
September 22	"My Sharona"	The Knack
September 29	"Sad Eyes"	Robert John
October 6	"Sad Eyes"	Robert John
October 13	"Don't Stop 'til You Get Enough"	Michael Jackson
October 20	"Sail On"	Commodores
October 27	"Rise"	Herb Alpert
November 3	"Rise"	Herb Alpert
November 10	"Heartache Tonight"	Eagles
November 17	"Still"	Commodores
November 24	"Babe"	Styx
December 1	"Babe"	Styx
December 8	"Babe"	Styx
December 15	"No More Tears (Enough Is Enough)"	Barbra Streisand & Donna Summer
December 22	"Escape (The Pina Colada Song)"	Rupert Holmes
December 29	"Escape (The Pina Colada Song)"	Rupert Holmes

== See also ==
- 1979 in music
- List of Hot 100 number-one singles of 1979 (U.S.)
