= Songs of Love (Anita Ward album) =

Studio album by Anita Ward
- Released: 1979
- Studios: Malaco Studios, Jackson, Mississippi; Ardent Studios, Memphis, Tennessee; Criteria Studios, North Miami, Florida
- Genres: Soul; funk
- Length: 40:28
- Label: Juana Records
- Producer: Frederick Knight

Anita Ward chronology
Songs of Love (1979)	Sweet Surrender (1979)

Singles from Songs of Love
- 1. "Make Believe Lovers" Released: 1978; 2. "Ring My Bell" Released: 1979

Professional ratings
Review scores
Source	Rating
Christgau's Record Guide	C+

Songs of Love is the debut studio album by American singer Anita Ward released on Juana. It includes the chart-topping hit single "Ring My Bell". "Make Believe Lovers" was also released as a single but failed to chart. Big Break Records released this album on CD in March 2013.

== Track listing ==
No.	Title	Writer(s)	Length
1.	"Make Believe Lovers"	Frederick Knight; David Camon; Michael Ward; Sam Dees	7:00
2.	"If I Could Feel That Old Feeling Again"	Camon	4:11
3.	"Spoiled by Your Love"	Knight; Dees	3:50
4.	"I Won't Stop Loving You"	Chuck Holmes	4:34
5.	"Ring My Bell"	Knight	8:11
6.	"Sweet Splendor"	Dees	3:48
7.	"There's No Doubt About It"	Joe Shamwell; Tommy Tate	3:54
8.	"You Lied"	Anita Ward; Holmes; Jimmy Lowe	5:03

== Personnel ==
- Strings and horns arrangements – Mike Lewis
- Bass guitar – Don Barrett, Ray Griffin
- Drums – James Stroud
- Engineer – James Griffin
- Guitar – Dino Zimmerman, Fred Knobloch, Michael Terence Ward, Michael Toles
- Keyboards – Carson Whitsett, Frederick Knight
- Producer, percussion, electronic drums – Frederick Knight
- Synthesizer – Carl Marsh
- Backing vocals – Cheryl Bundy, Charles Chalmers, Donna Rhodes, Frederick Knight, Sandra Rhodes, Valerie Williams
- Strings and horns – The Miami Symphony
- Photography – Gregory Heisler

== Charts ==
=== Weekly charts ===
Chart (1979)	Peak position
Australia (Kent Music Report)	73
Canada Top Albums/CDs (RPM)	10
Swedish Albums (Sverigetopplistan)	31
US Billboard Top LP & Tapes	8
US Billboard Top Soul LPs	2

=== Year-end charts ===
Chart (1979)	Position
Canada Top Albums/CDs (RPM)	61

== Certifications ==
Region	Certification	Certified units/sales
Canada (Music Canada)	Gold	50,000^{^}
^{^} Shipments figures based on certification alone.
