= Songs of Love =

Songs of Love may refer to:

- Songs of Love (Anita Ward album)
- Songs of Love (Mark Eitzel album)
- Songs of Love (Simply Red album)
- Songs of Love, a 2003 compilation album by Sting
- "Songs of Love", a track on Casanova by The Divine Comedy, first used as the theme music for comedy series Father Ted
