= Heart of Glass (song) =

1979 song by Blondie

- U.S. vinyl single picture sleeve

Single by Blondie

from the album Parallel Lines
- B-side: "Rifle Range" (UK); "11:59" (US)
- Released: December 1978
- Recorded: June 1978
- Studio: Record Plant, New York City
- Genre: Disco; new wave
- Length: 3:22 (US 7" version); 4:12 (UK 7" version); 3:54 (original album version); 5:50 (12" "disco" version, 2nd album version); 4:33 ("Special Mix" from The Best of Blondie)
- Label: Chrysalis
- Songwriters: Debbie Harry; Chris Stein
- Producer: Mike Chapman

Blondie singles chronology
| "Hanging on the Telephone" (1978) | "Heart of Glass" (1978) | "Sunday Girl" (1979) |

Music video
- "Heart of Glass" on YouTube

"Heart of Glass" is a song by the American new wave band Blondie, written by singer Debbie Harry and guitarist Chris Stein, and produced by Mike Chapman. It was featured on the band's third studio album, Parallel Lines (1978), and was released as the album's third single in January 1979 by Chrysalis Records, reaching number one on the charts in several countries, including the US Billboard Hot 100 and the UK Singles Chart. The accompanying music video was directed by Stanley Dorfman and filmed in a short-lived club.

"Heart of Glass" ranked at number 66 in the UK's official list of biggest selling singles of all-time in 2018, with sales of 1.32 million copies, being the 9th best selling single of the 1970s in the UK. It was inducted into the Grammy Hall of Fame as a recording of "qualitative or historical significance" in 2015. Harry herself stated that "Heart of Glass" was, along with "Rapture", the song she was proudest of having written.

In December 2004, Rolling Stone ranked the song number 255 on its list of the 500 greatest songs of all time. It was ranked at number 259 when the list was updated in April 2010 and at number 138 in their 2021 update. Slant Magazine placed it at number 42 on their list of the greatest dance songs of all time and Pitchfork named it the 18th best song of the 1970s. Billboard magazine included "Heart of Glass" in their lists of the best pop songs and dance songs of all time in 2023 and 2025.

In 2020, Harry and Stein sold their future royalties to the song and the rest of Blondie's catalog to Hipgnosis Songs Fund, which now belongs to Sony Music Publishing.

== Background ==
Debbie Harry and Chris Stein wrote an early version of "Heart of Glass", called "Once I Had a Love", in 1974–75. This earlier version was initially recorded as a demo in 1975. The song had a slower, funkier sound with a basic disco beat. For this reason the band referred to it as "The Disco Song". This original version was inspired by The Hues Corporation's hit disco song "Rock the Boat" (1974). The song was re-recorded in a second demo with the same title in 1978, when the song was made a bit more pop-oriented. Harry said that "'Heart of Glass' was one of the first songs Blondie wrote, but it was years before we recorded it properly. We'd tried it as a ballad, as reggae, but it never quite worked", and that "the lyrics weren't about anyone. They were just a plaintive moan about lost love." It was only when the band met with producer Mike Chapman to start work on Parallel Lines that Harry recalled Chapman "asked us to play all the songs we had. At the end, he said: 'Have you got anything else?' We sheepishly said: 'Well, there is this old one.' He liked it – he thought it was fascinating and started to pull it into focus."

Exactly who decided to give the song a more pronounced disco vibe is subject to differing recollections. On some occasions, the producer Mike Chapman has stated that he convinced Harry and Stein to give the song a disco twist. On other occasions, Chapman has credited Harry with the idea. As a band, Blondie had experimented with disco before, both in the predecessors to "Heart of Glass" and in live cover songs that the band played at shows. Bassist Gary Valentine noted that the set list for early Blondie shows often included disco hits such as "Honey Bee" or "My Imagination". The song's eventual title was taken from the 1976 film of the same name by Werner Herzog, although none of the group had actually seen the movie. As noted by Bob Stanley, the track "blended [Blondie's] NYC punk stance with sleek sequenced disco at a time when the two forms were still seen to be diametrically opposed".

In an interview published in the February 4, 1978, edition of NME, Debbie Harry expressed her affinity for the Euro disco music of Giorgio Moroder, stating that "It's commercial, but it's good, it says something... that's the kind of stuff that I want to do". A notable example of this type of musical experimentation occurred when Blondie covered Donna Summer's "I Feel Love" at the Blitz Benefit on May 7, 1978. In his history of CBGB, music writer Roman Kozak described this event: "When Blondie played for the Johnny Blitz benefit in May 1978, they surprised everyone with a rendition of Donna Summer's 'I Feel Love'. In the middle of the great rock versus disco split, it was arguably the first time in New York that a rock band had played a disco song. Blondie went on to record 'Heart of Glass,' other groups recorded other danceable songs, and dance rock was born."

For the single release, Chapman remixed the track, with the double-tracked bass drum further accentuated.

In reflecting on the development of "Heart of Glass" from its earliest incarnations until the recorded version on Parallel Lines, Chris Stein noted that the earliest versions had a basic conventional disco beat, but that the recorded version incorporated the electronic sound of Euro disco, stating that "The original arrangement of 'Heart of Glass'—as on the [1975] Betrock demos—had doubles on the high-hat cymbals, a more straight-ahead disco beat. When we recorded it for Parallel Lines we were really into Kraftwerk, and we wanted to make it more electronic. We weren't thinking disco as we were doing it; we thought it was more electro-European."

The Parallel Lines version (as well as most others) contained some rhythmic features that were very unusual for the disco context, which typically follows a strict four-beats-per-measure pattern for maximum danceability. The instrumental interludes in "Heart of Glass", in contrast, consist of 7/4 (seven-beat) phrases, with exception to the last phrase and subsequent reprises of each interlude, which resolve back to eight beats per phrase.

The song is associated with the disco, new wave, pop, dance-rock, and synth-pop genres.

== Production ==
Blondie - "Heart of Glass"
The Roland CR-78 drum machine introduction to the song

"Heart of Glass" was recorded at the Record Plant in New York City in June 1978. The production of "Heart of Glass" was discussed in detail by Richard Allinson and Steve Levine on the BBC Radio 2 radio program The Record Producers that was aired on May 25, 2009. As explained in the program, the production of "Heart of Glass" was built around the use of a Roland CR-78 drum machine. The CR-78 was first introduced in 1978, the same year that Parallel Lines was recorded, and the use of this device on "Heart of Glass" was, according to the program, among the earliest uses of this device in popular music. As the program explained, using a drum machine in the context of a rock band was also very unusual.

In deciding to use the CR-78 for "Heart of Glass", the choice was made to combine the sound of the drum machine with the sound of actual drumming. This reflected the hybrid nature of the song, the combination of a drum machine that was typically used in the context of dance music with the actual drum sound that was a traditional aspect of rock recordings. In combining these elements, the sound of the drum machine was first recorded on an individual track. To synchronize the actual drum play with the drum machine, the drums were also recorded on separate tracks, with the bass drum recorded separately from the rest of the drums.

Having combined the drums with the drum machine, another important feature of the CR-78 was that it could be used to send a trigger pulse to the early polyphonic synthesizers. This trigger pulse feature was also used on "Heart of Glass". The trigger pulse created by the CR-78 became a distinctive electronic/synth element of the song. The additional synthesizer portions of the song were played separately.

Other electronic musical instruments used in the track include the Roland SH-5 and Minimoog synthesizers. Due to the lack of music sequencers, they recorded three different parts using the SH-5 and Minimoog.

For the guitars, each guitar part was again recorded on separate tracks. For the vocals, Debbie Harry's voice was double-tracked (sung twice and combined into a single track).

In an interview in the magazine that is part of the collector's edition for the 2011 ninth Blondie studio album Panic of Girls, Debbie Harry explained that band members Chris Stein and Jimmy Destri had purchased the CR-78 from a music store on 47th Street in Manhattan and that this is how the device had become part of the production of "Heart of Glass": "Chris and Jimmy were always going over to 47th Street where all the music stores were, and one day they came back with this little rhythm box, which went 'tikka tikka tikka'... And the rest is history!" Stein also credited Destri with influencing the song's sound, saying he "had a lot to do with how the record sounds... It was Jimmy who brought in the drum machine and a synthesiser. Synchronising them was a big deal at the time. It all had to be done manually, with every note and beat played in real time rather than looped over."

== Release ==
A 5:50 version of "Heart of Glass" was first released as a 12-inch single in December 1978. Some radio stations in the United States were reluctant to play the song because of the "pain in the ass" lyric, so an edited 7-inch single was released in January 1979. The original album version was released as a single in the UK where the BBC bleeped out the word "ass". Debbie Harry told The Guardian, "At first, the song kept saying: 'Once I had a love, it was a gas. Soon turned out, it was a pain in the ass.' We couldn't keep saying that, so we came up with: 'Soon turned out, had a heart of glass.' We kept one 'pain in the ass' in – and the BBC bleeped it out for radio."

The single reached number one on the singles charts in the US, Australia and the UK. In the US, the single was certified Gold by the Recording Industry Association of America in April 1979, representing sales of one million copies. In the UK, it was certified Platinum by the British Phonographic Industry in February 1979, also for sales of one million copies. It was also certified double platinum in Australia.

Despite its overall popularity, "Heart of Glass" was not a hit in New York City's traditional discothèques such as Studio 54, Xenon and Crisco Disco, and reached only No. 58 in Billboard's Disco Top 80 chart. One of the first rock/disco fusion hits, it was more popular in rock-oriented nightclubs such as Hurrah and the Mudd Club.

Cash Box said it is a "synthesizer-based song" that should get Blondie recognized and that "Deborah Harry's vocals are shimmering and inviting." Record World said that it "could create a new audience for the group." Billboard, Paste and The Guardian all named "Heart of Glass" as Blondie's best song.

Blondie re-recorded the song for the 2014 2-disc set Blondie 4(0) Ever.

"Heart of Glass" was re-released in 2018 as a 6-track EP in promotion of Blondie's archive collection box set Against the Odds 1974–1982.

=== Controversy ===
At the time, Blondie was one of the bands at the forefront of New York's growing new wave music scene. The band was accused of "selling out" for releasing a disco song. According to Harry, "Heart of Glass" made the band pariahs in the eyes of many of their fellow musicians in the New York music scene. The band was accused of pandering to the mainstream that many punk/new wave bands at the time were actively rebelling against. She also said, "People got nervous and angry about us bringing different influences into rock. Although we'd covered 'Lady Marmalade' and 'I Feel Love' at gigs, lots of people were mad at us for 'going disco' with 'Heart of Glass'... Clem Burke, our drummer, refused to play the song live at first. When it became a hit, he said: 'I guess I'll have to.'" Chris Stein was unrepentant about the song's disco sound, saying, "As far as I was concerned, disco was part of R&B, which I'd always liked."

Despite the controversy, the song was a huge hit and helped propel Blondie from cult group to mainstream icons. The band itself has acknowledged the success of the song in helping their careers and has downplayed criticism of the song, pointing out that they always experimented with different styles of music and that "Heart of Glass" was their take on disco. The band itself has jokingly taken to referring to the song as "The Disco Song" in interviews. The band also credits the TV sitcom about a radio station, WKRP in Cincinnati, which played the song on one of their episodes and gave it critical exposure. In gratitude, the band gave the series' producers a Gold record for the song and it can be seen in the bullpen scenes from the second season to the series' conclusion.

== Music video ==
The "Heart of Glass" music video was directed by Stanley Dorfman. Contrary to popular belief, it was not filmed at the Studio 54 nightclub; Chris Stein said that "in the video, there's a shot of the legendary Studio 54, so everyone thought we shot the video there, but it was actually in a short-lived club called the Copa or something". The video begins with footage of New York City at night before joining Blondie on stage. Then, the video alternates between close-ups of Debbie Harry's face as she lip-syncs and mid-distance shots of the entire band. Harry said, "For the video, I wanted to dance around but they told us to remain static, while the cameras moved around. God only knows why. Maybe we were too clumsy."

In the video, Harry wears a silver asymmetrical dress designed by Stephen Sprouse. To create the dress, Sprouse photo-printed a picture of television scan lines onto a piece of fabric, and then, according to Harry, "put a layer of cotton fabric underneath and a layer of chiffon on top, and then the scan-lines would do this op-art thing." The popularity of the song helped Sprouse's work earn a lot of exposure from the media. Harry also said that the T-shirts used by the male members of the band in the video were made by herself.

Kris Needs summarized while writing for Mojo Classic: "Draped in a sheer, silver Sprouse dress, Debbie sang through gritted teeth, while the boys cavorted with mirror balls". Studying Harry's attitude in the "effortlessly cool" video, musician and writer Pat Kane felt she "exuded a steely confidence about her sexual impact ... The Marilyn do has artfully fallen over, and she's in the funkiest of dresses: one strap across her shoulder, swirling silks around about her. Her iconic face shows flickers of interest, amidst the boredom and ennui of the song's lyrics." Kane also noted that the band members fooling around with disco balls, "taking the mickey out of their own disco fixation". Reviewing the 2005 Greatest Hits: Sound & Vision DVD for Pitchfork, Jess Harvell wrote that while "owning your own copy of 'Heart of Glass' may not seem as cool [anymore] ... there's the always luminous Deborah Harry, who would give boiling asparagus an erotic charge, all while looking too bored to live."

== Track listings and formats ==
UK 7" (CHS 2275)
| No. | Title | Length |
|---|---|---|
| 1. | "Heart of Glass" (Debbie Harry, Chris Stein) | 4:12 |
| 2. | "Rifle Range" (Stein, Ronnie Toast) | 3:37 |

UK 12" (CHS 12 2275)
| No. | Title | Length |
|---|---|---|
| 1. | "Heart of Glass (Disco Version)" (Harry, Stein) | 5:50 |
| 2. | "Heart of Glass (Instrumental)" (Harry, Stein) | 5:17 |
| 3. | "Rifle Range" (Stein, Toast) | 3:37 |

Italy 12" (9198 107)
| No. | Title | Length |
|---|---|---|
| 1. | "Heart of Glass (Long Disco-Version)" (Harry, Stein; edited by Ronald Thorpe) | 9:00 |
| 2. | "Heart of Glass (Vocal)" (Harry, Stein) | 5:50 |
| 3. | "Heart of Glass (Instrumental)" (Harry, Stein) | 5:20 |

US 7" (CHS 2295)
| No. | Title | Length |
|---|---|---|
| 1. | "Heart of Glass" (Harry, Stein) | 3:22 |
| 2. | "11:59" (Jimmy Destri) | 3:20 |

US 12" (CDS 2275)
| No. | Title | Length |
|---|---|---|
| 1. | "Heart of Glass (Disco Version)" (Harry, Stein) | 5:50 |
| 2. | "Heart of Glass (Instrumental)" (Harry, Stein) | 5:17 |

US 1995 Remix CD (7243 858387 2 9)
| No. | Title | Length |
|---|---|---|
| 1. | "Heart of Glass (Diddy's Remix Edit)" | 3:57 * |
| 2. | "Heart of Glass (Original Single Version)" | 4:12 |
| 3. | "Heart of Glass (MK 12" Mix)" | 7:16 |
| 4. | "Heart of Glass (Richie Jones Club Mix)" | 8:42 |
| 5. | "Heart of Glass (Diddy's Adorable Illusion Mix)" | 7:33 |

UK 1995 Remix CD (7243 882236 2 1)
| No. | Title | Length |
|---|---|---|
| 1. | "Heart of Glass (Diddy's Adorable Edit)" | 3:57 |
| 2. | "Heart of Glass (Diddy's Adorable Illusion Mix)" | 7:33 |
| 3. | "Heart of Glass (Richie Jones Club Mix)" | 8:42 |
| 4. | "Heart of Glass (MK 12" Mix)" | 7:16 |
| 5. | "Heart of Glass (Original 12" Mix)" | 5:50 ** |

2018 EP
| No. | Title | Length |
|---|---|---|
| 1. | "Heart of Glass (Disco Long)" | 5:57 ** |
| 2. | "Heart of Glass (Basic Track)" | 6:16 |
| 3. | "Heart of Glass (A Shep Pettibone Mix)" | 5:34 |
| 4. | "The Disco Song" | 4:03 |
| 5. | "Once I Had a Love" | 3:23 |
| 6. | "Heart of Glass (Disco Instrumental)" | 5:18 |

* This mix is identical to the UK "Diddy's Adorable Edit".
** This is the original 1979 "Disco Version".

== Charts ==
=== Weekly charts ===
| Chart (1979) | Peak position |
|---|---|
| Australia (Kent Music Report) | 1 |
| Austria (Ö3 Austria Top 40) | 1 |
| Belgium (Ultratop 50 Flanders) | 5 |
| Canada Top Singles (RPM) | 1 |
| Canada Adult Contemporary (RPM) | 1 |
| Canada Dance/Urban (RPM) | 1 |
| Finland (Suomen virallinen lista) | 10 |
| Ireland (IRMA) | 2 |
| Italy (Musica e dischi) | 8 |
| Netherlands (Dutch Top 40) | 5 |
| Netherlands (Single Top 100) | 8 |
| New Zealand (Recorded Music NZ) | 1 |
| Norway (VG-lista) | 5 |
| South Africa (Springbok Radio) | 2 |
| Sweden (Sverigetopplistan) | 3 |
| Switzerland (Schweizer Hitparade) | 1 |
| UK Singles (Official Charts) | 1 |
| US Billboard Hot 100 | 1 |
| US Adult Contemporary (Billboard) | 44 |
| US Disco Top 80 (Billboard) | 58 |
| US Cash Box Top 100 | 1 |
| US Record World Singles | 1 |
| West Germany (GfK) | 1 |

| Chart (1995)^{1} | Peak position |
|---|---|
| Scotland (OCC) | 15 |
| UK Singles (Official Charts) | 15 |
| UK Dance (OCC) | 12 |
| UK Pop Tip Club Chart (Music Week) | 2 |
| US Hot Dance Club Play (Billboard) | 7 |
| US Hot Dance Music/Maxi-Singles Sales (Billboard) | 11 |

^{1}Remix

=== Year-end charts ===
| Chart (1979) | Position |
|---|---|
| Australia (Kent Music Report) | 3 |
| Austria (Ö3 Austria Top 40) | 11 |
| Belgium (Ultratop 50 Flanders) | 53 |
| Canada Top Singles (RPM) | 2 |
| Netherlands (Dutch Top 40) | 78 |
| Netherlands (Single Top 100) | 59 |
| New Zealand (Recorded Music NZ) | 1 |
| South Africa (Springbok Radio) | 15 |
| Switzerland (Schweizer Hitparade) | 11 |
| UK Singles (OCC) | 2 |
| US Billboard Hot 100 | 18 |
| US Cash Box Top 100 | 11 |

| Chart (1995)^{1} | Position |
|---|---|
| UK Pop Tip Club Chart (Music Week) | 35 |

^{1}Remix

=== Decade-end charts ===
| Chart (1970–1979) | Position |
|---|---|
| UK Singles (OCC) | 32 |

== Certifications and sales ==
| Region | Certification | Certified units/sales |
|---|---|---|
| Australia (ARIA) | Platinum | 200,000 |
| Canada (Music Canada) | 2× Platinum | 300,000^{^} |
| Denmark (IFPI Danmark) | Gold | 45,000^{‡} |
| France (SNEP) | Gold | 500,000^{*} |
| Germany (BVMI) | Gold | 500,000^{^} |
| Italy (FIMI) | Gold | 50,000^{‡} |
| New Zealand (RMNZ) | 2× Platinum | 60,000^{‡} |
| Spain (Promusicae) | Gold | 30,000^{‡} |
| United Kingdom (BPI) | 2× Platinum | 1,322,316 |
| United States (RIAA) | Gold | 1,000,000^{^} |
^{*} Sales figures based on certification alone.^{^} Shipments figures based on certification alone.^{‡} Sales+streaming figures based on certification alone.

== Remixes and samplings ==
The first official remix of "Heart of Glass", by Shep Pettibone, appeared on the 1988 Blondie/Debbie Harry remix compilation Once More into the Bleach and was a single in some territories. A 1995 remix by Diddy, from the Blondie compilation Beautiful: The Remix Album, reached no. 15 on the UK Singles Chart.

The 2002 song "Work It", by Missy Elliott from her album Under Construction, samples the drum machine intro of "Heart Of Glass".

Picking up on their similarities, the Hood Internet's ABX created a mashup of "Heart of Glass" and Arcade Fire's new wave-infused "Sprawl II" of 2010. (Harry later joined Arcade Fire in live performances of both songs at the 2014 Coachella Festival.)

Blondie rerecorded the song for the 2014 compilation album Greatest Hits Deluxe Redux, part of the two-disc set Blondie 4(0) Ever, which marked the 40th anniversary of the band forming.

In 2020, Miley Cyrus performed a cover of the song during iHeart Festival, gaining over 250 million views / impressions on YouTube.

== Associates version ==
In 1988, Scottish singer Billy Mackenzie delivered The Glamour Chase, the fourth studio album by the Associates to his record company WEA/Warner who rejected the record. However, they decided to release Mackenzie's cover of "Heart of Glass" as a single. It reached number 56 on the UK Singles chart and was put on the 1990 compilation Popera: The Singles Collection.

=== Charts ===
| Chart (1988) | Peak position |
|---|---|
| UK Singles (Official Charts) | 56 |

== Wink version ==
There is a cover version in Japanese by Wink, whose title is "Garasu no Kokoro (Heart of Glass)". It is included in the album Especially for You: Yasashisa ni Tsutsumarete, which reached number 1 on the Oricon albums chart, and was certified platinum by RIAJ, in Japan in 1989.

== Crabtree Remix (The Handmaid's Tale) ==
A mashup by Daft Beatles (mashup producer Jonas Crabtree) subtitled "Crabtree Remix" was released as a single in 2016. It combines elements of "Heart of Glass" and the Naxos recording of the second movement of Philip Glass's 1987 Violin Concerto No. 1, performed by the Ulster Orchestra conducted by Takuo Yuasa and featuring violinist Adele Anthony.

The star of The Handmaid's Tale TV series, Elisabeth Moss, said in an interview for Refinery29 that she discovered the "Crabtree Remix" while making a playlist to prepare for her role as June Osborne and played it to the show's director Reed Morano. "Reed decided to put in the show during the protest scene, which is the perfect place for it. That song gives me chills just talking about it." The series' costume designer Ane Crabtree also cites the "Crabtree Remix" as an inspiration for creating the iconic Handmaid's look: "Lizzy Moss introduced me to the Philip Glass/Blondie mashup 'Heart of Glass' by Daft Beatles. Listening to it over and over again led to me designing the head gear for the Handmaids".

== Gisele and Bob Sinclar version ==
"Heart of Glass"

Single by Gisele and Bob Sinclar
- Released: April 29, 2014
- Length: 3:04
- Label: Ultra
- Songwriters: Debbie Harry; Chris Stein
- Producer: Bob Sinclar

Gisele singles chronology
| "All Day and All of the Night" (2013) | "Heart of Glass" (2014) |

Bob Sinclar singles chronology
| "Cinderella (She Said Her Name)" (2013) | "Heart of Glass" (2014) | "I Want You" (2014) |

=== Background ===
In 2014, the Brazilian supermodel Gisele Bündchen went into the recording studio with French music producer and DJ Bob Sinclar to record a cover version of Blondie's "Heart of Glass" for H&M. She is credited on the single by her mononym Gisele. The song is Gisele's and Sinclar's charity single for the H&M 2014 campaign. Bündchen spoke to the fashion trade magazine Women's Wear Daily about the opportunity of working with Sinclar on "Heart of Glass" stating: "I never in a million years thought that I would record a song and to work with a producer like Bob." A year earlier, she had recorded and released a cover version of the Kinks' "All Day and All of the Night" as her contribution to the H&M 2013 charity campaign.

=== Reception ===
The "Heart of Glass" single was issued on the Ultra Records label and was officially released on April 29, 2014. The new version turned out to be an international hit charting in a great number of European singles charts including France at number 31, reaching number 73 in Germany, peaking at number 28 in Poland, number 27 in Spain, number 31 in Hungary, number 63 in Austria and at number 16 in Belgium. All proceeds from the song are to go towards helping to raise funds for UNICEF. The radio edit single version is available on iTunes.

=== Music video ===
The "Heart of Glass" music video by Gisele and Bob Sinclar shows her dancing on a beach. The video also features Bündchen's vocal rendition of the song as the supermodel poses in sexy beachwear. The music video made its premiere on the morning television show Good Morning America.

=== Track listings and format ===
US Digital
| No. | Title | Length |
|---|---|---|
| 1. | "Heart of Glass (Radio Edit Version)" (Debbie Harry, Chris Stein) | 3:04 |

US Digital (UL5303)
| No. | Title | Length |
|---|---|---|
| 1. | "Heart of Glass (Club Extended)" (D. Harry, C. Stein) | 4:16 |

=== Charts ===
| Chart (2014) | Peak position |
|---|---|
| Austria (Ö3 Austria Top 40) | 63 |
| Belgium (Ultratip Bubbling Under Wallonia) | 16 |
| Belgium Dance (Ultratop Wallonia) | 35 |
| France (SNEP) | 31 |
| Germany (GfK) | 73 |
| Hungary (Single Top 40) | 31 |
| Poland Dance (ZPAV) | 28 |
| Spain (Promusicae) | 27 |

== Miley Cyrus version ==
"Heart of Glass"

Promotional single by Miley Cyrus

from the album Plastic Hearts (Digital edition)
- B-side: "Midnight Sky"
- Released: September 29, 2020
- Venue: T-Mobile Arena (Las Vegas, NV)
- Genre: Rock and roll
- Length: 3:33
- Label: RCA
- Songwriters: Debbie Harry; Chris Stein
- Producer: Stacy Jones

American singer Miley Cyrus performed a cover of the song at the 2020 iHeartRadio Music Festival on September 19, 2020. The live performance was released as a digital single on September 29, 2020, following a high demand from fans. "Heart of Glass" was later included on Cyrus's seventh studio album, Plastic Hearts, as a bonus track. Hunter Harris of Vulture called her performance "a throaty, formidable delight". The cover elicited praise from Blondie themselves, with them stating "We think Miley Cyrus nailed it" on their social media.

=== Track listing and formats ===
Digital download and streaming
| No. | Title | Length |
|---|---|---|
| 1. | "Heart of Glass" (Live from the iHeart Music Festival) | 3:33 |

Streaming (Spotify release)
| No. | Title | Length |
|---|---|---|
| 1. | "Heart of Glass" (Live from the iHeart Music Festival) | 3:33 |
| 2. | "Midnight Sky" | 3:43 |

=== Chart performance ===
| Chart (2020) | Peak position |
|---|---|
| Canada Hot 100 (Billboard) | 86 |
| Global 200 (Billboard) | 150 |
| Ireland (IRMA) | 17 |
| New Zealand Hot Singles (RMNZ) | 11 |
| UK Singles (Official Charts) | 38 |
| US Bubbling Under Hot 100 (Billboard) | 24 |
| US Digital Song Sales (Billboard) | 43 |

=== Certifications ===
| Region | Certification | Certified units/sales |
|---|---|---|
| Brazil (Pro-Música Brasil) | 2× Platinum | 80,000^{‡} |
| New Zealand (RMNZ) | Gold | 15,000^{‡} |
| Norway (IFPI Norway) | Gold | 30,000^{‡} |
| Poland (ZPAV) | Gold | 25,000^{‡} |
| United Kingdom (BPI) | Silver | 200,000^{‡} |
| United States (RIAA) | Gold | 500,000^{‡} |
^{‡} Sales+streaming figures based on certification alone.

== Elisapie version ==
"Uummati Attanarsimat (Heart of Glass)"

Single by Elisapie

from the album Inuktitut
- Released: March 2023
- Genre: folk pop
- Songwriters: Debbie Harry; Chris Stein

Music video
- Elisapie - Uummati Attanarsimat (Heart of Glass) on YouTube

In March 2023, Canadian Inuk singer Elisapie released a cover of "Heart of Glass" with the lyrics translated by her into Inuktitut, entitled "Uummati Attanarsimat" (syllabics: ᐆᒻᒪᑎ ᐊᑦᑕᓇᕐᓯᒪᑦ). The song, and the music video directed by Philippe Leonard featuring archival footage of Inuit life, garnered acclaim; Blondie shared it on their Twitter account, and Debbie Harry sent Elisapie a message praising it. The cover became the lead single of Elisapie's album Inuktitut, released later that year, and consisting entirely of covers of hit songs in Inuktitut.

Elisapie explained her reasons for recording the translated song, explaining that it represented a tender memory from her childhood:

Elders know the melody but they were never able to really understand the lyrics because they don't speak English... Knowing that they'll listen to this and have a whole new layer ... for me is so exciting. ... One day this song came on in the small dance hall in a small town in Akulivik where we used to go visit family ... I remember just people gathering, jumping on the dance floor, just dancing away.

== See also ==
- Billboard Year-End Hot 100 singles of 1979
- List of Billboard Hot 100 number-one singles of 1979
- List of Billboard Hot 100 top 10 singles in 1979
- List of Cash Box Top 100 number-one singles of 1979
- List of number-one singles in Australia during the 1970s
- List of Top 25 singles for 1979 in Australia
- Lists of number-one singles (Austria)
- List of number-one singles of 1979 (Canada)
- List of number-one hits of 1979 (Germany)
- List of number-one singles in 1979 (New Zealand)
- List of RPM number-one dance singles of 1979
- List of number-one singles from 1968 to 1979 (Switzerland)
- List of UK Singles Chart number ones of the 1970s
- List of best-selling singles of the 1970s in the United Kingdom
