= Rise (Herb Alpert album) =

Studio album by Herb Alpert
- Released: September 1979 (LP); 1987 (A&M Records CD); 2007 (Shout! Factory CD)
- Studio: A&M Studios and Studio D (Hollywood, California).
- Genre: Smooth jazz, jazz-funk
- Length: 41:12
- Label: A&M; Shout! Factory
- Producer: Herb Alpert; Randy "Badazz" Alpert

Herb Alpert chronology
Main Event Live (1978)	Rise (1979)	Beyond (1980)

Singles from Rise
- 1. "Rise" Released: July 20, 1979; 2. "Rotation" Released: November 1979; 3. "Street Life" Released: March 3, 1980

Professional ratings
Review scores
Source	Rating
AllMusic	4/5 stars

Rise is a 1979 album by Herb Alpert.

== History ==
In 1979, the song "Rise", written by Andy Armer and Alpert's nephew Randy "Badazz" Alpert but without an accompanying album, became a worldwide sensation. The 12" version was a favorite of club DJs and the 7" single, released on July 20, 1979, reached the top of the Billboard Hot 100 chart in October, staying there for two weeks. "Rise" was Alpert's first No. 1 hit in the US since "This Guy's in Love with You" spent four weeks there in 1968. Armer and the Alperts then set about creating an album to capitalize on the song's success, and Rise was released in September.

Side 1 of Rise consists of original songs composed by Armer, Herb Alpert and Randy Alpert. Side 2 contains cover versions of songs that Herb Alpert admired. All songs featured the elder Alpert on trumpet, with many other studio musicians contributing.

The opening track, "1980", is an instrumental theme written by Herb Alpert that NBC Sports executive Don Ohlmeyer had originally commissioned for the network's planned coverage of the Summer Olympics in Moscow, but it was used seven years later as the official theme song for NBC's telecast of the 1986 FIFA World Cup in Mexico. The closing song on the first side is another Armer and Randy Alpert song called "Rotation", which was released as the follow-up single to "Rise", peaking at No. 30 on the Hot 100 chart in January 1980.

Side 2 of the album includes a cover of "Street Life," originally recorded by the Crusaders, a version of the Bill Withers song "Love Is" featuring Herb Alpert's vocals, a cover of ex-Procol Harum vocalist Gary Brooker's "Angelina," and a dance arrangement of Joaquín Rodrigo's 1939 classical guitar concerto Concierto de Aranjuez.

Rise was one of the first pop albums to use digital recording technology. It was recorded on a 3M 32-track recorder at Alpert's A&M Records studios in Hollywood, California.

The album peaked at No. 1 on the Billboard Jazz Albums chart and at No. 6 on both the Billboard 200 and R&B album chart, selling more than three million copies.

== Track listing ==
=== Original version ===
==== Side one ====
1. "1980" (Herb Alpert) - 2:25
2. "Rise" (Andy Armer, Randy "Badazz" Alpert) - 7:37
3. "Behind the Rain" (Herb Alpert) - 5:34
4. "Rotation" (Andy Armer, Randy "Badazz" Alpert) - 5:12

==== Side two ====
1. "Street Life" (Joe Sample, Will Jennings) - 5:01
2. "Love Is" (Bill Withers, Paul Smith) - 4:28
3. "Angelina" (Pete Sinfield, Gary Brooker) - 4:13
4. "Aranjuez (Mon Amour)" (Joaquín Rodrigo) - 6:42

=== 2007 reissue ===
1. "1980" - 2:25
2. "Rise" - 7:37
3. "Behind the Rain" - 5:34
4. Rotation - 5:12
5. Aranjuez (Mon Amour) - 6:42
6. "Love Is" - 4:28
7. "Angelina" - 4:13
8. "Street Life" - 5:01
9. "Rotation" (Alternate Version) - 4:28
10. "Aranjuez (Mon Amour)" (2007 Dance Remix) - 5:08

== Personnel ==
- Herb Alpert – trumpet, flugelhorn, vocals, orchestrations (1, 8)
- Michel Colombier – acoustic piano (1, 8), synth bass (1), orchestrations (1)
- Michael Boddicker – synthesizer programming (1)
- Andy Armer – Fender Rhodes (2), acoustic piano, Rhodes piano, clavinet, synthesizers
- Mike Lang – acoustic piano (2)
- Joe Sample – acoustic piano
- Pete Jolly – accordion (8)
- Carlos Rios – guitars (1, 3–8)
- Tim May – guitars
- Chris Pinnick – guitars
- Jay Dee Maness – slide guitar (7)
- Tommy Tedesco – lute (8), balalaika (8)
- James Jamerson Jr. – bass
- Bob Magnusson – acoustic bass (1)
- Abraham Laboriel – bass (2), acoustic guitar (8)
- Louis Johnson – bass (6)
- Jerry Knight – bass (8)
- Randy "Badazz" Alpert – drums, Moog drums, percussion, tavia, insanities
- Harvey Mason – drums
- Steve Schaeffer – drums (2), percussion
- Manolo Badrena – percussion
- Julius Wechter – marimba
- Emil Richards – percussion (8)
- John Bergamo – percussion (8)
- Bill Reichenbach Jr. – alto trombone (1)
- Bob Findley – trumpet (1)
- Tom Scott – Lyricon (8)
- Tom Tom 84 – string orchestrations (3, 5)
- Gene Page – orchestrations (8)
- Benjamin Barrett – string contractor (3, 5)
- Paul Shure – concertmaster (3, 5)
- Harry Bluestone – concertmaster (8)

== Production ==
- Herb Alpert – producer
- Randy "Badazz" Alpert – producer
- Andy Armer – associate producer
- Don Hahn – engineer (1, 2, 8), remixing
- Mark Smith – engineer (3–7)
- Don Koldon – assistant engineer (1, 2, 8), remix assistant
- Skip Cottrell – assistant engineer (3–7)
- Steve Katz – assistant engineer (3–7)
- Bernie Grundman – mastering
- Roland Young – art direction
- Amy Nagasawa – design
- Barry McKinley – photography

== Legacy ==
"Rise," "Rotation," and "Street Life" played during early "Luke and Laura" scenes in General Hospital.
