= List of Canadian number-one albums of 1979 =

These are the Canadian number-one albums of 1979 as compiled by RPM.

Issue date	Album	Artist
January 6	52nd Street	Billy Joel
January 13	Barbra Streisand's Greatest Hits Vol. 2	Barbra Streisand
January 20	Barbra Streisand's Greatest Hits Vol. 2	Barbra Streisand
January 27	Barbra Streisand's Greatest Hits Vol. 2	Barbra Streisand
February 3	Barbra Streisand's Greatest Hits Vol. 2	Barbra Streisand
February 10	52nd Street	Billy Joel
February 17	52nd Street	Billy Joel
February 24	Blondes Have More Fun	Rod Stewart
March 3	Blondes Have More Fun	Rod Stewart
March 10	Spirits Having Flown	Bee Gees
March 17	Spirits Having Flown	Bee Gees
March 24	Spirits Having Flown	Bee Gees
March 31	Spirits Having Flown	Bee Gees
April 7	Spirits Having Flown	Bee Gees
April 14	Spirits Having Flown	Bee Gees
April 21	Minute by Minute	The Doobie Brothers
April 28	Minute by Minute	The Doobie Brothers
May 5	Minute by Minute	The Doobie Brothers
May 12	Minute by Minute	The Doobie Brothers
May 19	Minute by Minute	The Doobie Brothers
May 26	Breakfast in America	Supertramp
June 2	Breakfast in America	Supertramp
June 9	Breakfast in America	Supertramp
June 16	Breakfast in America	Supertramp
June 23	Breakfast in America	Supertramp
June 30	Bad Girls	Donna Summer
July 7	Breakfast in America	Supertramp
July 14	Breakfast in America	Supertramp
July 21	Bad Girls	Donna Summer
July 28	Breakfast in America	Supertramp
August 4	Breakfast in America	Supertramp
August 11	Cheap Trick at Budokan	Cheap Trick
August 18	Breakfast in America	Supertramp
August 25	Breakfast in America	Supertramp
September 1	Breakfast in America	Supertramp
September 8	Get the Knack	The Knack
September 15	Get the Knack	The Knack
September 22	Get the Knack	The Knack
September 29	Get the Knack	The Knack
October 6	Get the Knack	The Knack
October 13	Get the Knack	The Knack
October 20	Breakfast in America	Supertramp
October 27	Breakfast in America	Supertramp
November 3	In Through the Out Door	Led Zeppelin
November 10	In Through the Out Door	Led Zeppelin
November 17	The Long Run	Eagles
November 24	The Long Run	Eagles
December 1	In Through the Out Door	Led Zeppelin
December 8	In Through the Out Door	Led Zeppelin
December 15	In Through the Out Door	Led Zeppelin
December 22	In Through the Out Door	Led Zeppelin
December 29	In Through the Out Door	Led Zeppelin

== See also ==
- List of Canadian number-one singles of 1979
