= Roland SH-3A =

SH-3A
- SH-3A with case
- Manufacturer: Roland
- Dates: 1975–1976
- Price: UK£400

Technical specifications
- Polyphony: Monophonic
- Timbrality: Monotimbral
- Oscillator: 1 VCO, 1 White/Pink Noise Generator
- LFO: LFO1 has sawtooth waveform, LFO2 sine or square and delay slider, Sample-and-Hold with level and sample time sliders. LFO's can be assigned to VCF, VCA, VCO.
- Synthesis type: Analog Subtractive
- Filter: Resonant self-oscillating low-pass filter w/ frequency and resonance controls
- Attenuator: 1 ADSR
- Aftertouch expression: No
- Velocity expression: No
- Storage memory: None
- Effects: None

Input/output
- Keyboard: 44 keys (F–C)

The SH-3A is a monophonic analog synthesizer that was manufactured by Roland from 1975 to 1981. It is unique in that it is capable of both the usual subtractive synthesis and also the less common additive synthesis, offering mixable waveforms at different footages. Two LFOs and a unique sample-and-hold section provided capabilities not found in competing self-contained synthesizers of the time. The SH-3A was Roland's first non-preset based synth. The predecessor, the Roland SH-1000, could also do this but didn't offer as much control as on the SH-3A. The rhythmic pulsing in the Blondie song "Heart of Glass" is an example of its sound.

Contrary to common belief, the initial version "SH-3" did not infringe on the transistor ladder-filter patent of Robert Moog. It used a diode filter like the EMS VCS 3. The SH-3A does use a transistor ladder-filter and as a result can generate Moog-like sounds.

== Notable SH-3A users ==
- Blondie
- Chris Carter
- Covenant
- The Human League
- Radio Massacre International
- Vangelis
- Yello
Close-up of SH-3A controls
