= Frederick Knight (singer) =

American singer-songwriter (born 1944)

- Born: August 15, 1944 (age 81); Birmingham, Alabama, U.S.
- Occupations: Singer; songwriter; record producer

Frederick Knight (born August 15, 1944) is an American R&B singer, songwriter, and record producer.

== Biography ==
Knight recorded with Mercury and Capitol in New York before signing with Stax Records in 1972. He had his only UK hit single, "I've Been Lonely for So Long", in 1972. The song was on the chart for 10 weeks and reached number 22. Lack of further chart activity leaves him labelled as a one-hit wonder. However, Knight did appear in the documentary film Wattstax, which was released in 1973.

After Stax's demise Knight launched Juana Records, writing and producing The Controllers, and he had a UK Number 1 chart credit with Anita Ward's "Ring My Bell" in 1979. Knight cut "I've Been Lonely for So Long" in Birmingham, Alabama, with a seasoned southern soul crew behind him, and hit again in 1975 with "I Betcha Didn't Know That".

The song "Be for Real", written by Knight and originally performed by Marlena Shaw on her 1976 album, Just a Matter of Time, was covered by Leonard Cohen for his 1992 album The Future; and subsequently by The Afghan Whigs for the 1996 movie, Beautiful Girls.

== Discography ==
=== Studio albums ===
- I've Been Lonely for So Long (Stax Records, 1973)
- Knight Kap (Juana Records, 1977)
- Let the Sunshine In (Juana Records, 1978)
- Knight Time (Juana Records, 1981)

=== Compilation album ===
- The Timeless Soul Collection (1987)

=== Singles ===
Year	Single	Peak chart positions		
Year	Single	US Pop	US R&B	UK
1972	"I've Been Lonely for So Long"	27	8	22
1972	"Trouble"	102	―	―
1973	"This Is My Song of Love to You"	―	―	―
1973	"Suzy"	―	―	―
1974	"Passing Thru"	―	―	―
1975	"I Betcha Didn't Know That"	―	27	―
1975	"I Wanna Play with You"	―	―	―
1976	"I'm Falling in Love Again"	―	―	―
1976	"Claim to Fame"	―	―	―
1976	"High Society"	―	―	―
1977	"Staying Power"	―	―	―
1978	"Sweet Life" (with Fern Kinney)	―	―	―
1978	"Sit Down on Your Love"	―	―	―
1979	"My Music Makes Me Feel Good"	―	―	―
1979	"If You Love Your Baby"	―	―	―
1981	"Let Me Ring Your Bell Again"	―	―	―
1981	"The Old Songs"	―	74	―
1983	"If Tomorrow Never Comes"	―	―	―
"—" denotes releases that did not chart or were not released in that territory.

== See also ==
- One-hit wonders in the UK
