= Ring My Bell =

1979 single by Anita Ward

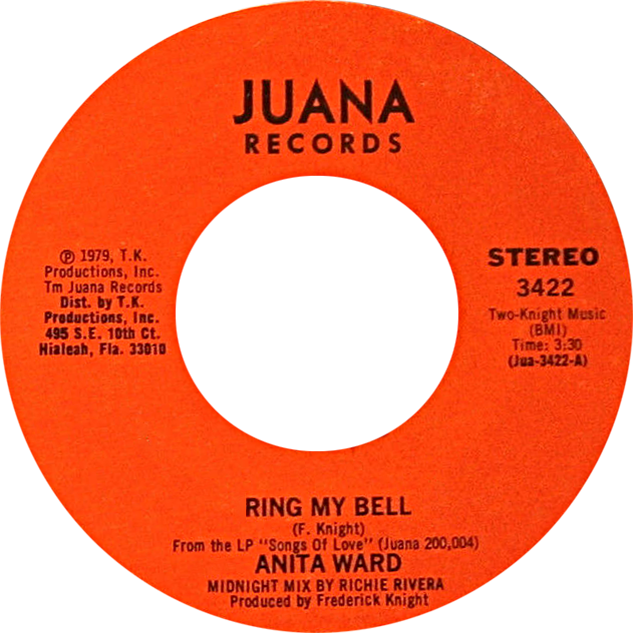
- Red side-A label variant of the US 7-inch single

Single by Anita Ward

from the album Songs of Love
- B-side: "If I Could Feel That Old Feeling Again"
- Released: 1979
- Genre: Disco; dance
- Length: 3:30 (7" single); 8:11 (12"/ album)
- Label: Juana (through TK)
- Songwriter: Frederick Knight
- Producer: Frederick Knight

Anita Ward singles chronology
"Ring My Bell" (1979)	"Make Believe Lovers" (1979)

Music video
- "Ring My Bell": TopPop on YouTube

"Ring My Bell" is a 1979 disco song written by Frederick Knight and performed by Anita Ward.

"Ring My Bell" went to number one in June 1979 on the US Billboard Hot 100, the Disco Top 80 chart and the Soul Singles chart. It also reached number one on the UK singles chart. The song's popularity led to Ward's nomination for Best Female R&B Vocal Performance at the 1980 Grammy Awards.

The song was originally written for eleven-year-old Stacy Lattisaw as a teenybopper song about children talking on the telephone. When Lattisaw signed with a different label, American singer and musician Anita Ward was asked to sing it instead, and it became her only major hit.

== Composition ==
The song is noted for its innovative use of the Synare electronic drum, playing a decaying high-pitched tom tone on the first beat of every bar. It also uses chimes. The lyrics concern a woman encouraging her partner to relax with her after a hard day at work.

The lyric "You can ring my bell" was seen as sexually suggestive according to 1984 book The Slanguage of Sex, "'You can ring my bell any time you want to' would be regarded as a 'come-on' phrase in the US if used by a female," and "Songs like 'Ring My Bell' by Anita Ward caused scarcely a raised eyebrow in the '70s." Songwriter Frederick Knight, however, said that he deliberately avoided any overly suggestive lyrics, wanting to project a clean-cut image for Ward.

== Legacy ==
In October 2000, VH1 ranked "Ring My Bell" No. 53 in its list of 100 Greatest Dance Songs. In 2010, Billboard magazine included it in its list of the 50 Sexiest Songs of All Time. In 2020, Slant Magazine ranked "Ring My Bell" No. 80 in its 100 Best Dance Songs of All Time list. The significance of the song to the history of disco is discussed in Episode 3 of the 2024 PBS series Disco: Soundtrack of a Revolution. Same year, Forbes ranked it No. 12 in its list of the 30 Greatest Disco Songs of All Time.

In March 2025, Billboard ranked it No. 33 in its list of the 100 Best Dance Songs of All Time, writing, "Anita Ward was working as a substitute teacher in Memphis when she recorded "Ring My Bell", a disco song that became her only major hit.

The track was written by Frederick Knight, who had minor success in the early 1970s with the famed soul outfit Stax Records. Knight initially penned "Ring My Bell" for the young singer Stacy Lattisaw, envisioning a song about teenagers chatting on the phone. This origin story is often disputed, as the opening lyric was often interpreted as a double entendre: You can ring my bell, anytime, anywhere. The instrumentation is pleasingly plush, with a whooping sound accenting the first beat, guitars pawing around the edges of the drums, and a chiming motif that pairs perfectly with Ward's flirty hook."

== Charts ==
=== Weekly charts ===
Chart (1979)	Peak position
Australia (Kent Music Report)	3
Austria (Ö3 Austria Top 40)	3
Belgium (Ultratop 50 Flanders)	4
Canada Top Singles (RPM)	1
Canada Adult Contemporary (RPM)	1
Canada Dance/Urban (RPM)	1
Ecuador (Radio Vision)	3
Finland (Suomen virallinen lista)	3
France (IFOP)	2
Ireland (IRMA)	2
Italy (Musica e dischi)	5
Netherlands (Dutch Top 40)	2
Netherlands (Single Top 100)	8
New Zealand (Recorded Music NZ)	1
Norway (VG-lista)	1
South Africa (Springbok Radio)	3
Spain (AFE)	1
Sweden (Sverigetopplistan)	2
Switzerland (Schweizer Hitparade)	5
UK Singles (Official Charts)	1
US Billboard Hot 100	1
US Disco Top 80 (Billboard)	1
US Hot Soul Singles (Billboard)	1
US Cash Box Top 100	1
US Record World Singles	1
West Germany (GfK)	3

Chart (1990)	Peak position
UK Singles (Official Charts)	99

Chart (2022)	Peak position
Hungary (Single Top 40)	17

=== Year-end charts ===
Chart (1979)	Rank
Australia (Kent Music Report)	31
Austria (Ö3 Austria Top 40)	15
Belgium (Ultratop 50 Flanders)	19
Canada Top Singles (RPM)	17
France (IFOP)	22
Netherlands (Dutch Top 40)	16
Netherlands (Single Top 100)	95
New Zealand (Recorded Music NZ)	27
US Billboard Hot 100	9
US Hot Soul Singles (Billboard)	2
US Cash Box Top 100	6
West Germany (GfK)	34

=== All-time charts ===
Chart (1958-2018)	Position
US Billboard Hot 100	340

== Certifications ==
Region	Certification	Certified units/sales
Canada (Music Canada)	Platinum	150,000^{^}
United Kingdom (BPI)	Gold	500,000^{^}
United States (RIAA)	Platinum	2,000,000^{^}
^{^} Shipments figures based on certification alone.

== Other versions ==
=== Collette version ===
"Ring My Bell"

Single by Collette

from the album Raze the Roof
- B-side: "Save Yourself"
- Released: February 27, 1989
- Recorded: Studios 301 (Sydney)
- Length: 3:22
- Label: CBS
- Songwriter: Frederick Knight
- Producers: Kirke Godfrey; Peewee Ferris

Collette singles chronology
"Ring My Bell" (1989)	"All I Wanna Do Is Dance" (1989)

Music video
- "Ring My Bell" on YouTube

"Ring My Bell" was covered by New Zealand-born Australian pop singer Collette and released in 1989 as her debut single. The song peaked at number five on the Australian ARIA Charts and was certified gold by ARIA.

==== Track listing ====
- 7" (CBS 654631)

A. "Ring My Bell" – 3:22
B. "Save Yourself" – 4:06

- 12"

A1. "Ring My Bell" (Ring-a-Ling Mix) – 6:12
A2. "Ring My Bell" (Ding-Dong Mix) – 5:41
B1. "Save Yourself" (Survival Mix) – 5:53
B2. "Save Yourself" (Pow Wow Mix) – 6:39

==== Weekly charts ====
Chart (1989)	Peak position
Australia (ARIA)	5
New Zealand (Recorded Music NZ)	4
UK Singles (Official Charts)	93

==== Year-end charts ====
Chart (1989)	Rank
Australia (ARIA)	29

==== Certification ====
Region	Certification	Certified units/sales
Australia (ARIA)	Gold	35,000^{^}
^{^} Shipments figures based on certification alone.

=== Aitch version ===
In June 2026, English rapper Aitch released "RMB (Ring My Bell)", a UK rap and pop dance rework produced in collaboration with Bou that samples Anita Ward's original. This track went viral on video platform TikTok, being used in football edits during the 2026 FIFA World Cup and became associated with England's victory over Mexico in the Azteca Stadium.

==== Charts ====
Chart (2026)	Peak position
Austria (Ö3 Austria Top 40)	33
Belgium (Ultratop 50 Wallonia)	37
Germany (GfK)	29
Hungary (Single Top 40)	37
Ireland (IRMA)	60
Netherlands (Dutch Top 40)	23
Netherlands (Single Top 100)	9
Poland Airplay (OLiS)	19
Poland Airplay (OLiS); Polish Remix	18
Poland Streaming (OLiS)	38
Poland Streaming (OLiS); Polish Remix	6
San Marino Airplay (SMRTV Top 50)	40
Switzerland (Schweizer Hitparade)	45
UK Singles (Official Charts)	40

== See also ==
- List of 1970s one-hit wonders in the United States
- List of Billboard Hot 100 number ones of 1979
- List of Cash Box Top 100 number-one singles of 1979
- List of European number-one hits of 1979
- List of Billboard number-one dance singles of 1979
- List of Hot Soul Singles number ones of 1979
- List of number-one singles of 1979 (Canada)
- List of number-one singles in 1979 (New Zealand)
- List of number-one singles of 1979 (Spain)
- List of RPM number-one dance singles of 1979
- List of UK Singles Chart number ones of the 1970s
- VG-lista 1964 to 1994
