= Beat of the Night =

Single by Fever

from the album Fever
- B-side: "Pump It Up"
- Released: 1979
- Genre: Disco
- Length: 3:59 (7" version); 5:54 (12" disco mix); 5:54 (Album version)
- Label: Fantasy
- Songwriters: Dale Reed, Joseph Bomback, Dennis Wadlington
- Producer: Dale Reed

Fever singles chronology
"Pump It Up" (1979)	"Beat of the Night" (1979)	"Dreams and Desire" (1980)

Beat of the Night is a 1979 disco single by Ohio-based, group Fever. The single was the most successful of the group's three releases on the disco/dance chart. Along with the track, "Pump It Up", "Beat of the Night" hit number one on the disco chart for one week. The single also peaked at number ninety-three on the soul singles.

== Chart performance ==
Chart (1979)	Peak position
US "Billboard" Disco Top 80	1
US Billboard Hot Soul Singles	93
