= Juana Records =

American independent record label

- Founded: 1975
- Founder: Clinton Harris and Frederick Knight
- Location: Midfield, Alabama

Juana Records was an American independent record label. It was founded by musicians Clinton Harris and Frederick Knight in 1975, in Midfield, Alabama, United States, and distributed by TK Records. Its only Top 40 hit single was the Billboard No. 1 ranked "Ring My Bell", written by Knight and performed by Anita Ward (Juana single 3422) in 1979. Other notable albums included The Controllers' 1977 debut album, In Control, and Knight's own Let the Sunshine In.

== See also ==
- List of record labels
