= Fever (band) =

American disco trio

Fever was a disco trio from San Francisco who scored a number of hits on the Hot Dance Music/Club Play Chart, the most successful being "Beat of the Night" / "Pump It Up," which hit #1. The band consisted of Dale Reed, Joseph "Joe" Bomback and Dennis Wadlington.

The single "Beat of the Night" was the most successful of the group's three releases on the disco/dance chart. Along with the track "Pump it Up", "Beat of the Night" hit number one on the disco chart for one week. The single also peaked at number ninety-three on the soul singles.

The group got together in 1978 and put out a 12" that was a cover of The Four Tops hit "Standing in the Shadows of Love" which peaked at number nineteen on the disco chart. Their LP that followed featured Patrick Cowley on synthesizers.

In 1980,"Dreams and Desires" along with "The One Tonight" became their final single, peaking at number thirteen on the disco charts.

== See also ==
- List of number-one dance hits (United States)
- List of artists who reached number one on the US Dance chart
