= Rise (instrumental) =

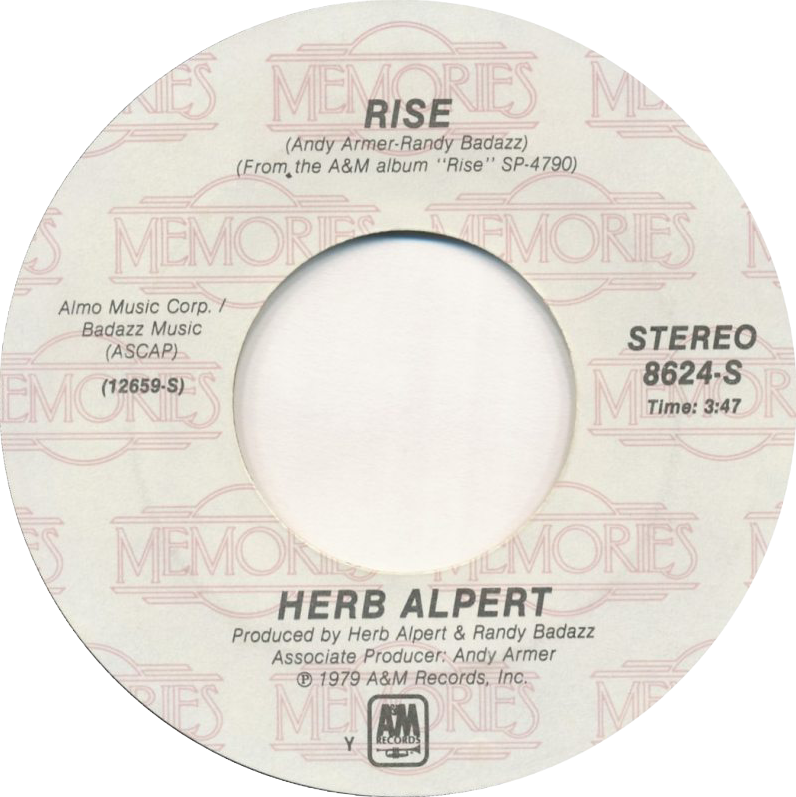

Single by Herb Alpert

from the album Rise
- B-side: "Aranjuez (Mon Amor)"
- Released: July 20, 1979
- Recorded: March 6, 1979
- Genre: Jazz-funk; disco
- Length: 7:40 (album version); 3:50 (single version)
- Label: A&M
- Songwriters: Andy Armer, Randy Alpert
- Producers: Herb Alpert, Randy Alpert

Herb Alpert singles chronology
"Lobo" (1978)	"Rise" (1979)	"Rotation" (1979)

"Rise" is an instrumental written by Andy Armer and Randy 'Badazz' Alpert, first recorded in 1979 by trumpeter Herb Alpert. Released as a single from Alpert's solo album Rise, the song reached #1 on the Billboard charts. It is the instrumental sample for The Notorious B.I.G. hit "Hypnotize".

== Background ==
"Rise" was written by Herb Alpert's nephew Randy, in collaboration with Andy Armer. The A&R representative at A&M Records, Chip Cohen, knew Randy Alpert was into funk and disco music. He asked Randy to rework Tijuana Brass hits as funk tracks. Herb Alpert recalls, "I think we started by playing ‘A Taste of Honey’ or ‘Tijuana Taxi'. And it just felt like the wrong approach. I didn’t feel comfortable playing that way."

As Alpert and Armer were working on Cohen's assignment, they decided to write an original song for Herb as well. The result was "Rise". “Rise” was originally recorded as an uptempo dance number, however, while recording the master at A&M studios, the drummer on the session, Steve Schaeffer, strongly suggested that Herb and Randy try slowing the tempo down to 100bpm. As Tom Breihan would write later in Stereogum, "Maybe that idea — making 'Rise' into something disco-adjacent, rather than straight disco — allowed the song to thrive in the late-1979 days when the disco backlash was taking shape."

The song received an unlikely boost from being featured in a notorious episode of the soap opera General Hospital, in which Luke Spencer raped Laura Webber while "Rise" played on the soundtrack. "Rise" reached number one on the U.S. Billboard Hot 100 in October of that year and remained in the top position for two weeks. Herb Alpert thus became the first artist to reach the top of the Hot 100 with a vocal performance ("This Guy's in Love with You", 1968) as well as an instrumental performance. "Rise" was also successful on other charts, peaking at number four on the R&B chart, number 17 on the disco chart and spending one week atop the adult contemporary chart. The recording also received a Grammy Award for Best Pop Instrumental Performance. Songwriters Armer and Alpert were nominated for a Grammy Award for Best Instrumental Composition.

"Rise" became a club hit in the United Kingdom under unusual circumstances. According to Fred Bronson in The Billboard Book of Number 1 Hits, "British club DJs failed to notice the imported American 12-inch pressings were recorded at 33 rpm, and played 'Rise' at the wrong speed, making it sound much faster than even Randy had intended. As the song was instrumental, there were no clues to suggest they were wrong and 'Rise' became a U.K. hit in its speeded-up version."

"Rise" has been frequently requested as a sample by various artists. Randy Alpert declined most of them. When he heard the tape of Notorious B.I.G. rapping over "Rise" he was wildly enthusiastic about it and immediately approved the sample. He later gave Bell Biv DeVoe permission to sample the song, because he was a fan of the group. He declined to let The Sopranos use the song during a scene where someone was being beaten. Alpert also refused to let Pfizer use "Rise" in a campaign for Viagra which would have relied on the double entendre implied by the song's title.

In October 2016 the "Rise Remix EP" was released on the Herb Alpert Presents label. It has seven selections with six remixes as well as the original track.

== Personnel ==
- Herb Alpert – trumpet
- Tim May, Chris Pinnick – guitars
- Abe Laboriel – bass guitar
- Mike Lang – acoustic piano
- Andy Armer – Fender Rhodes electric piano
- Julius Wechter – marimba
- Steve Schaeffer – drums
- Don Hahn, Don Koldon – engineers

== Charts ==
=== Weekly charts ===
Chart (1979–1980)	Peak position
Canada Top Singles (RPM)	5
UK Singles (Official Charts)	13
US Billboard Hot 100	1

=== Year-end charts ===
Chart (1979)	Rank
US Top Pop Singles (Billboard)	80

Chart (1980)	Rank
US Top Pop Singles (Billboard)	54

== Covers and samples ==
- A sample of "Rise" is the entire musical groove of the 1997 song "Hypnotize", recorded by The Notorious B.I.G. and co-produced by Sean "Puffy" Combs.
- Bell Biv DeVoe sampled "Rise" in their 2016 song "Run". The song's lyrics also quote The Notorious B.I.G.'s "Hypnotize".
- "Rise" was recreated in the style of nu jazz by New York City producer Jonathan Hay and Worcester, Massachusetts artist Atlas Jenkins for the album Wish You Were Brooklyn: The Electro Jazz House Invasion Soundtrack (Deluxe).

== See also ==
- List of Hot 100 number-one singles of 1979 (U.S.)
- List of number-one adult contemporary singles of 1979 (U.S.)
- Luke Spencer and Laura Webber

== Bibliography ==
- The Billboard Book of Top 40 Hits, Billboard Books; 9th Edition, 2010, ISBN 978-0823085545
