= List of Billboard Hot 100 number ones of 1979 =

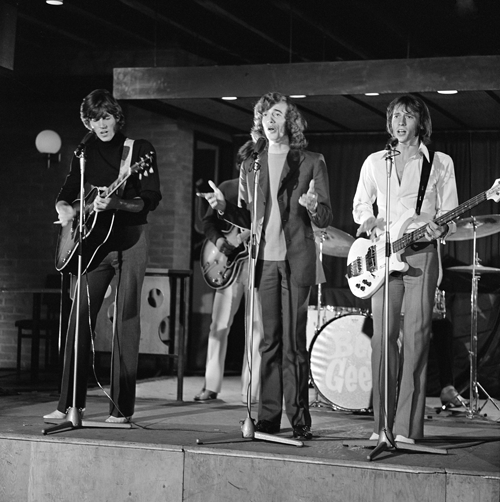
The Bee Gees (pictured in 1968) matched the Beatles' record of six consecutive Hot 100 number ones in 1979.

The Billboard Hot 100 is a chart published since August 1958 by Billboard magazine which ranks the best-performing singles in the United States. In 1979, it was compiled based on a combination of sales and airplay data sourced from surveys of retail outlets and playlists submitted by radio stations, respectively. During the year, 23 different singles spent time at number one.

In the issue of Billboard dated January 6, the Bee Gees reached number one with "Too Much Heaven", displacing the final chart-topper of 1978, "Le Freak" by Chic. "Too Much Heaven" was the fourth consecutive single by the Bee Gees to top the Hot 100; later in the year the group returned to number one with "Tragedy" and "Love You Inside Out", making them only the second act since the creation of the Hot 100 in 1958 to achieve six consecutive number ones, following the Beatles. The Bee Gees' chart domination ended at the close of the 1970s, however, following the decline in popularity of the disco genre with which they had become strongly associated. They never achieved another number one after 1979 and indeed all of their subsequent singles missed the top 10 with the sole exception of 1989's "One". Chic and Donna Summer were the only acts other than the Bee Gees to have more than one song spend time at number one in 1979. Chic's "Le Freak", a number one at the end of 1978, returned to the peak position for three more weeks in the new year and the group achieved a second number one with "Good Times" in August. Summer spent three non-consecutive weeks in the top spot with "Hot Stuff" in June and five consecutive weeks atop the chart with "Bad Girls" in July and August, and returned to number one in November with "No More Tears (Enough Is Enough)", a duet with Barbra Streisand. Summer's total of ten weeks at number one was the most by any act in 1979.

The year's longest-running number one was "My Sharona" by the Knack, which spent six consecutive weeks atop the Hot 100 beginning with the chart dated August 25. The band was one of ten acts to top the chart for the first time in 1979; most of the ten had only brief success on the Hot 100. Although the Knack had the longest-running chart-topper of 1979 with its debut single, the band did not reach the top 10 again and its chart career had ended completely by the end of 1981. The chart run of Anita Ward was even shorter; she reached number one with her first charting single, "Ring My Bell", in June 1979, but her follow-up single peaked only at number 87 and she never appeared on the Hot 100 again. The shortest Hot 100 career of any of the year's chart-topping acts was that of M; "Pop Muzik", which reached number one in November, was the only single by the act ever to enter the listing. Gloria Gaynor, Amii Stewart, Peaches & Herb, Robert John, Styx, and Rupert Holmes all reached number one for the first and only time in 1979. Peaches & Herb had first charted in 1966 but took more than a decade to reach the top spot. John had first appeared on the Hot 100 when "White Bucks and Saddle Shoes", released under his real name of Bobby Pedrick, Jr., reached number 74 in 1958 when he was just 12 years old. The 21-year gap between his first chart appearance and his first number one was a new record. Blondie was the only one of 1979's first-time chart-toppers to achieve further number ones; the new wave band went on to top the Hot 100 with three more singles before disbanding in 1982.

== Chart history ==
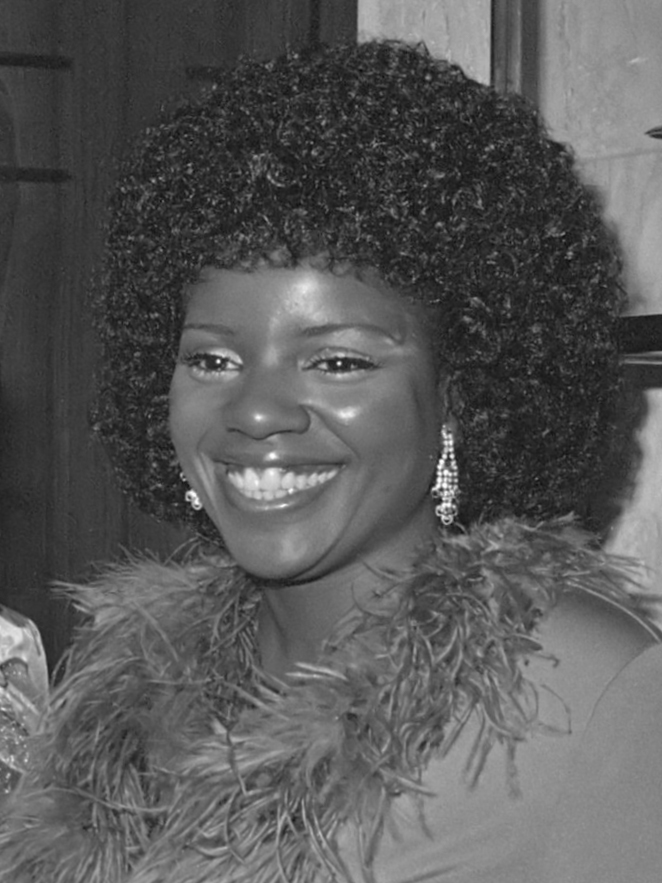
Gloria Gaynor achieved a number one with "I Will Survive" in 1979.

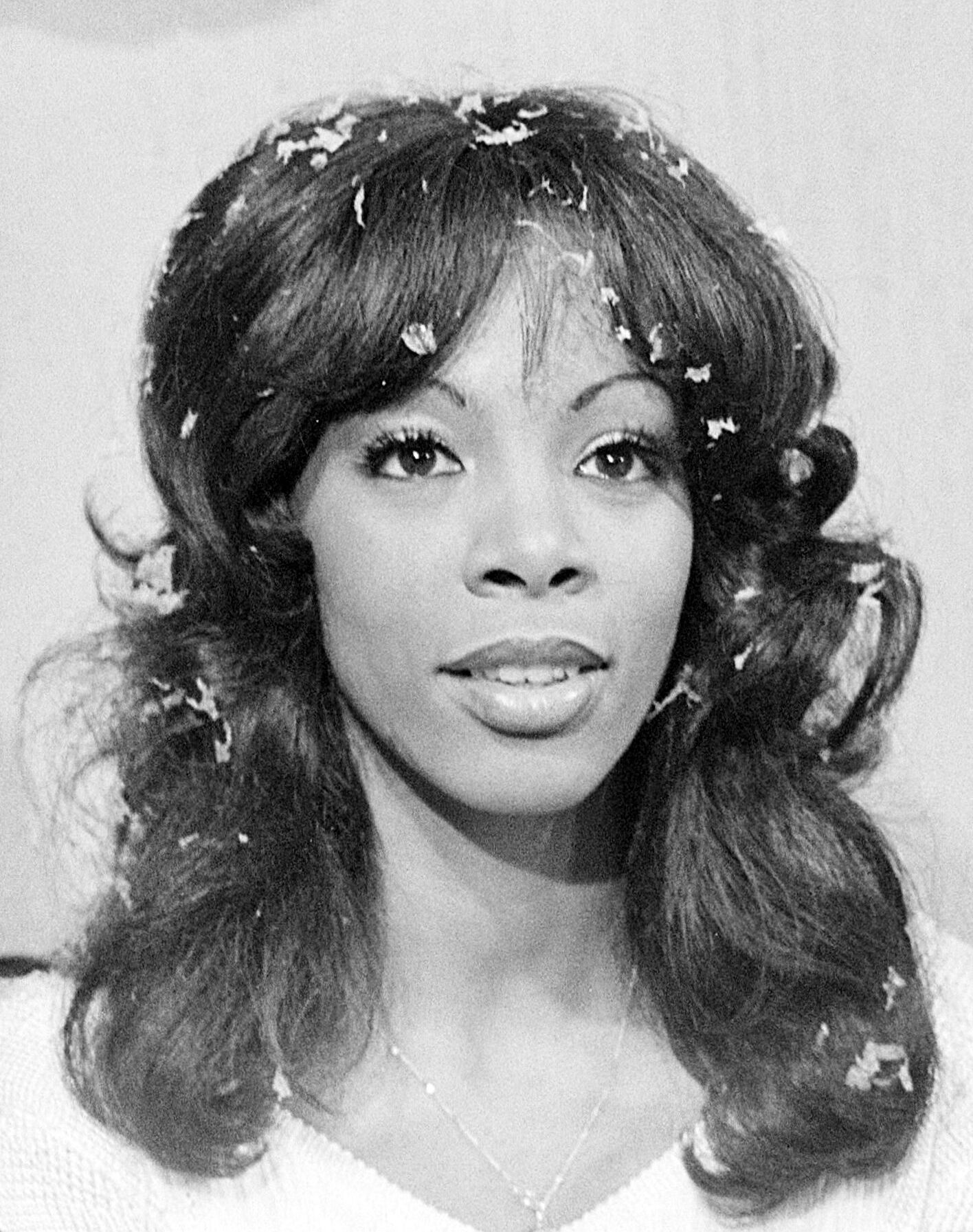
Donna Summer spent ten weeks at number one in 1979, the most of any act

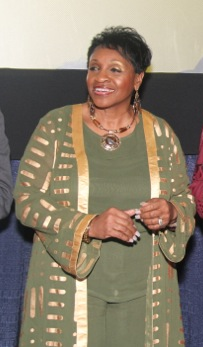
Anita Ward (pictured in 2015) had her only number one with "Ring My Bell".

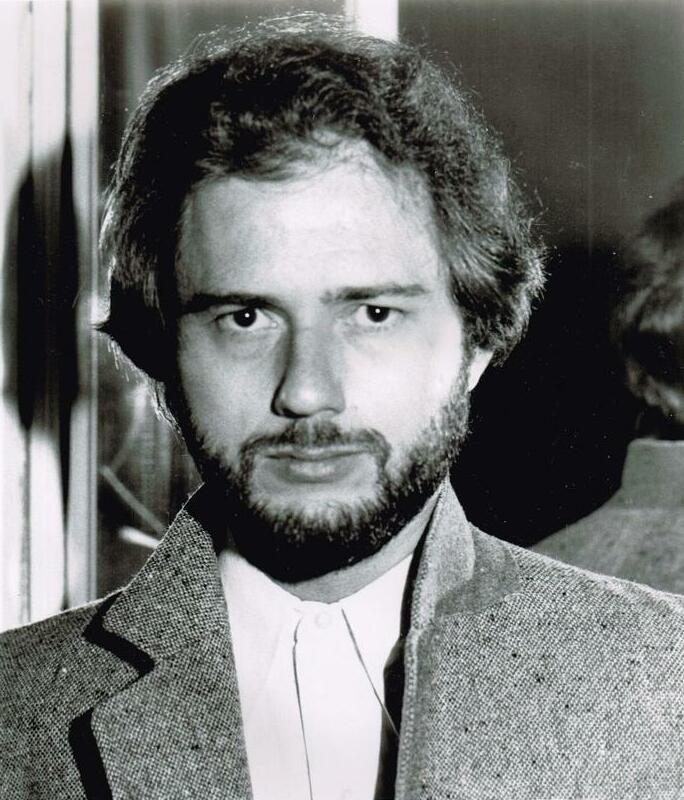
Rupert Holmes had the year's final number one.

Chart history
No. (Note: The "No." column indicates the numerical sequence of number ones in Hot 100 history. "Re" indicates a single returning to number one.)	Issue date	Title	Artist(s)	Ref.
457	January 6	"Too Much Heaven"	Bee Gees	
457	January 13	"Too Much Heaven"	Bee Gees	
456 (re)	January 20	"Le Freak"	Chic	
456 (re)	January 27	"Le Freak"	Chic	
456 (re)	February 3	"Le Freak"	Chic	
458	February 10	"Da Ya Think I'm Sexy?"	Rod Stewart	
458	February 17	"Da Ya Think I'm Sexy?"	Rod Stewart	
458	February 24	"Da Ya Think I'm Sexy?"	Rod Stewart	
458	March 3	"Da Ya Think I'm Sexy?"	Rod Stewart	
459	March 10	"I Will Survive"	Gloria Gaynor	
459	March 17	"I Will Survive"	Gloria Gaynor	
460	March 24	"Tragedy"	Bee Gees	
460	March 31	"Tragedy"	Bee Gees	
459 (re)	April 7	"I Will Survive"	Gloria Gaynor	
461	April 14	"What a Fool Believes"	The Doobie Brothers	
462	April 21	"Knock on Wood"	Amii Stewart	
463	April 28	"Heart of Glass"	Blondie	
464	May 5	"Reunited"	Peaches & Herb	
464	May 12	"Reunited"	Peaches & Herb	
464	May 19	"Reunited"	Peaches & Herb	
464	May 26	"Reunited"	Peaches & Herb	
465	June 2	"Hot Stuff"	Donna Summer	
466	June 9	"Love You Inside Out"	Bee Gees	
465 (re)	June 16	"Hot Stuff"	Donna Summer	
465 (re)	June 23	"Hot Stuff"	Donna Summer	
467	June 30	"Ring My Bell"	Anita Ward	
467	July 7	"Ring My Bell"	Anita Ward	
468	July 14	"Bad Girls"	Donna Summer	
468	July 21	"Bad Girls"	Donna Summer	
468	July 28	"Bad Girls"	Donna Summer	
468	August 4	"Bad Girls"	Donna Summer	
468	August 11	"Bad Girls"	Donna Summer	
469	August 18	"Good Times"	Chic	
470	August 25	"My Sharona"	The Knack	
470	September 1	"My Sharona"	The Knack	
470	September 8	"My Sharona"	The Knack	
470	September 15	"My Sharona"	The Knack	
470	September 22	"My Sharona"	The Knack	
470	September 29	"My Sharona"	The Knack	
471	October 6	"Sad Eyes"	Robert John	
472	October 13	"Don't Stop 'Til You Get Enough"	Michael Jackson	
473	October 20	"Rise"	Herb Alpert	
473	October 27	"Rise"	Herb Alpert	
474	November 3	"Pop Muzik"	M	
475	November 10	"Heartache Tonight"	Eagles	
476	November 17	"Still"	Commodores	
477	November 24	"No More Tears (Enough Is Enough)"	Barbra Streisand and Donna Summer	
477	December 1	"No More Tears (Enough Is Enough)"	Barbra Streisand and Donna Summer	
478	December 8	"Babe"	Styx	
478	December 15	"Babe"	Styx	
479	December 22	"Escape (The Piña Colada Song)"	Rupert Holmes	
479	December 29 (Note: This was an unpublished week, due to a special double issue that Billboard published in print the previous week. All positions on the Hot 100 were "frozen" during the break.)	"Escape (The Piña Colada Song)"	Rupert Holmes	

== Number-one artists ==
List of number-one artists by total weeks at number one
Weeks at No. 1	Artist
10	Donna Summer
6	The Knack
5	Bee Gees
4	Rod Stewart
4	Peaches & Herb
4	Chic
3	Gloria Gaynor
2	Anita Ward
2	Herb Alpert
2	Barbra Streisand
2	Styx
2	Rupert Holmes
1	The Doobie Brothers
1	Amii Stewart
1	Blondie
1	Robert John
1	Michael Jackson
1	M
1	Eagles
1	Commodores

== See also ==
- 1979 in music
- List of Cash Box Top 100 number-one singles of 1979
- List of Billboard Hot 100 number-one singles of the 1970s
