= Anita Ward =

American singer and musician (born 1956)

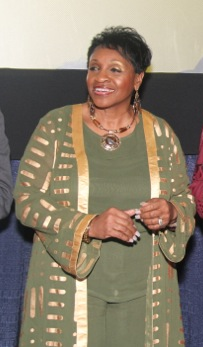
- Ward at the 2015 Miami International Film Festival presentation of The Record Man

Background information
- Born: December 20, 1956 (age 69); Memphis, Tennessee, U.S.
- Genres: R&B; disco; soul
- Occupations: Singer; musician
- Instrument: Vocals
- Years active: 1970–present
- Labels: TK; Juana; Virgin

Anita Ward (born December 20, 1956) (sources differ) is an American singer and musician from Memphis, Tennessee. Beginning her professional music career in the late 1970s, Ward is best known for her 1979 million-selling chart-topper R&B/Disco hit "Ring My Bell": it was no. 1 on the United States Hot 100, R&B, and Dance charts, and in the United Kingdom.

== Biography ==
=== Early life and education ===
Ward was born in Memphis, Tennessee, United States. Ward obtained a degree in psychology from Rust College in Holly Springs, Mississippi.

=== Career ===
Ward was a schoolteacher before signing a recording contract.

While recording her debut album, record label owner Frederick Knight presented her with a song he had written the previous year for Stacy Lattisaw. Ward did not like the song, but Knight insisted that a dance track was needed to capitalize on the current disco trend, and Ward relented. The song, which was originally a juvenile-targeted tune about teens talking on the telephone, was rewritten with more 'adult' lyrics and the result was the single "Ring My Bell". The single reached number one in the United States, the United Kingdom, and Canada in 1979. Her accompanying debut album, Songs of Love was released that same year. "Ring My Bell" has been remixed and released several times since its original release. After the huge success of "Ring My Bell", "Make Believe Lovers", which was the B-side on most 12" singles for "Ring My Bell", was released, but it failed to chart.

Ward released a second album later in the year; it was common in the 1970s to release albums several months apart. The album, entitled Sweet Surrender, featured the minor hit "Don't Drop My Love", which peaked at No. 87 on the US Billboard Hot 100 chart. The album, similar to Songs of Love, was disco-infused. A third disco album was in the works due to contractual issues between Knight and Ward, but was canceled after three songs had been recorded. These songs were later included on low-budget compilations featuring Anita Ward's first album Songs of Love. These disputes with Knight, a severe car accident Ward later was in, and the fading appeal of disco music halted Ward's career.

Many years later, Ward recorded another album, 1989's Wherever There's Love. The album was recorded in the United States, but was only released internationally as it had no US distributor. The album was a departure from Ward's disco past but still contained mostly fast-tempo 1980s pop songs (including a re-recorded version of "Ring My Bell"), in addition to two ballads. It spawned one single "Be My Baby", which was released in Australia, but it did not chart there. After both the album and single "Be My Baby" failed to chart, Ward took another hiatus from the music industry, focusing on her family, including her daughter born shortly after the release of Wherever There's Love.

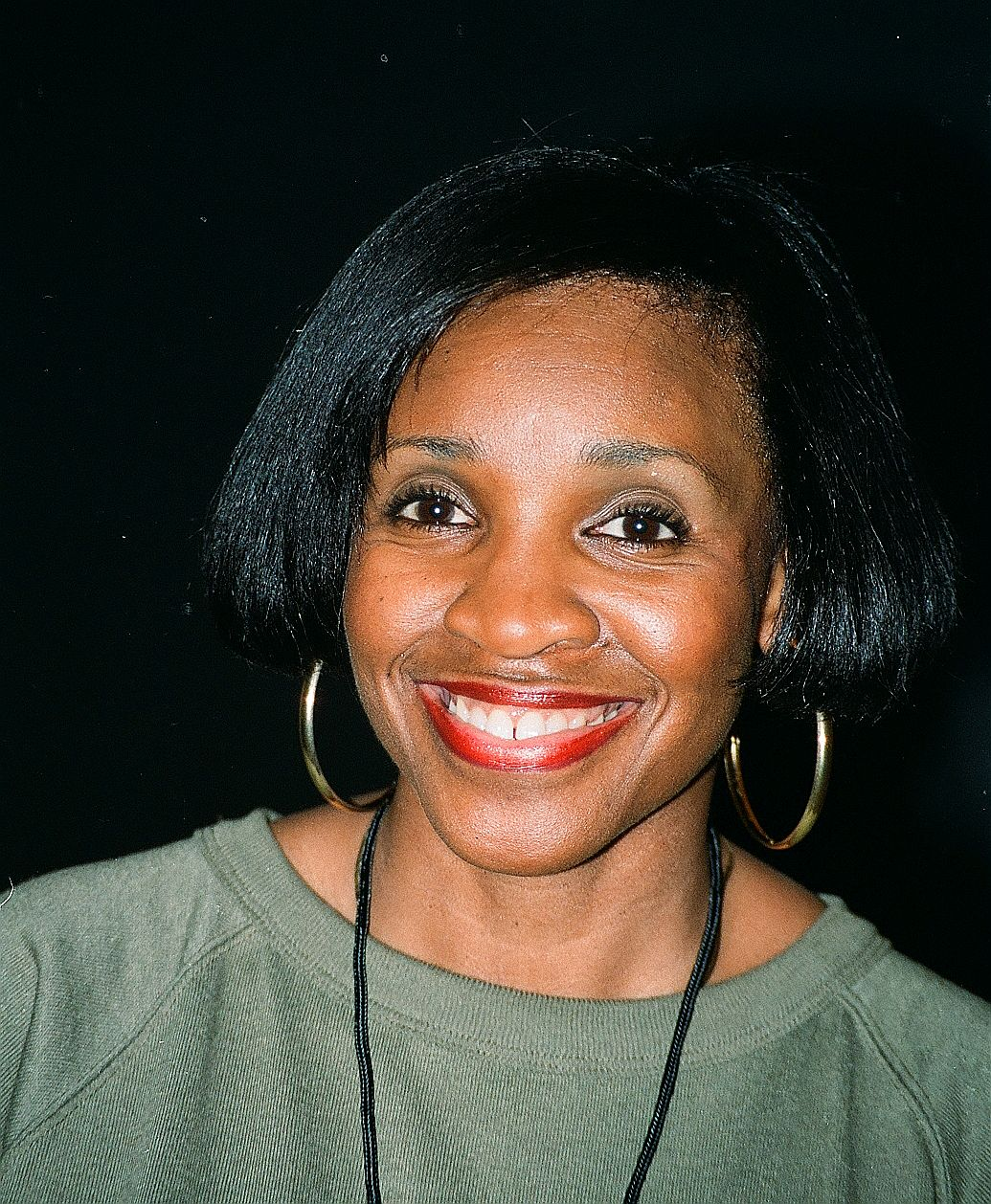
Ward in 1999

On New Year's Eve 2002, Ward performed "Ring My Bell" in New York City's Times Square before a crowd of revelers as part of the city's official celebration. On New Year's Eve 2005 she performed on Beale Street in Memphis, Tennessee, singing "Ring My Bell" and several other disco songs. Ward appeared in Zagreb, Croatia, on January 4, 2006, the night before the FIS World Cup slalom race on nearby Sljeme, with some other groups and singers from disco era (Nile Rodgers and Chic, Village People, Thelma Houston and Rose Royce). In early 2011, it was announced that Ward was back in the studio and released a new single, "It's My Night".

On January 23, 2024 Ward sang "Ring My Bell" at the First Ladies of Disco Show at the Smith Center in Las Vegas Nevada. She was joined by Janice-Marie Johnson of A Taste of Honey and Thea Austin of Snap! as well as comedian Marsha Warfield as special guests.

Ward is featured in the 2024 PBS series Disco: Soundtrack of a Revolution.

== Discography ==
=== Albums ===
Year	Title	Peak chart positions			Record label
Year	Title	US	US R&B	AUS	Record label
1979	Songs of Love	8	2	73	Juana Records
1979	Sweet Surrender	—	—	—	Juana Records
1989	Wherever There's Love	—	—	—	
"—" denotes the album failed to chart

=== Singles ===
Year	Title	Peak chart positions					Certifications	Record label	B-side	Album
Year	Title	US	US R&B	US Dance	AUS	UK	Certifications	Record label	B-side	Album
1979	"Ring My Bell"	1	1	1	3	1	BPI: Gold	Juana Records	"If I Could Feel That Old Feeling Again"	Songs of Love
1979	"Make Believe Lovers"	—	—	—	—	—		TK Records	"Spoiled by Your Love"	Songs of Love
1979	"Don't Drop My Love"	87	52	26	—	—		Juana Records	"Spoiled by Your Love"	Sweet Surrender
1980	"Can't Nobody Love Me Like You Do"	—	—	—	—	—		Juana Records	"Caught Between a Good Thing and Good-Bye"	Sweet Surrender
1981	"Cover Me"	—	—	—	—	—		Juana Records	"Can't Nobody Love Me Like You Do"	Sweet Surrender
1989	"Be My Baby"	—	—	—	164	—		Virgin Records	"When a Woman Loves"	Wherever There's Love
1990	"Ring My Bell" (UK reissue)	—	—	—	—	99				Non-album single
2011	"It's My Night"	—	—	—	—	—				Non-album single
"—" denotes the single failed to chart

== See also ==
- List of artists who reached number one in the United States
- List of artists who reached number one on the U.S. Dance Club Songs chart
- List of 1970s one-hit wonders in the United States
- List of people from Memphis, Tennessee
- List of disco artists (A–E)
- List of artists who reached number one on the UK Singles Chart
- List of one-hit wonders on the UK Singles Chart
