= Superstar (Lydia Murdock song) =

Single by Lydia Murdock
- A-side: "Superstar"
- B-side: "Superstar (instrumental version)"
- Released: 1983
- Label: Korova KOW 30 (UK 7")
- Songwriter: Michael Burton
- Producer: Michael Burton

UK singles chronology
"Superstar" (1983)	"Love on the Line" (1984)

Superstar was a 1983 single for US pop singer Lydia Murdock. It was a hit for her in the UK and Canada. It also charted in the United States.

== Background ==
"Superstar was written by Michael Burton. The song is an answer to Michael Jackson's hit "Billie Jean". The singer takes the place of Billie Jean and tells her side of the story.

It was released in the US on 12" on Team Entertainment TRS 3001. The flip side was an instrumental version.

== Reception ==
The single was reviewed by James Hamilton in the 30 July 1983 issue of Record Mirror. Reviewer Hamilton was cautiously saying that the song was the first female answer to "Billie Jean". The reviewer also said that the song was surprisingly rather good, and it had a nice story line. Directly underneath was the review of "Valley Style" by T-Ski Valley which was a rap track also based on the same song.

It was reviewed by David Hepworth in the 15–28 September issue of Smash Hits. Hepworth quoted the words, "I'm Billie Jean and I'm mad as hell", then he said that Michael Jackson had told his side of the story and now there's an answer record that had a near identical arrangement. He said that it could end up in court.

== Airplay ==
=== USA ===
It was reported by Cash Box in the 1 October issue that Murdoch's single was getting played on V103 in Atlanta, WILD in Boston and WGCI in Chicago where it was one of the Hots.

According to the 7 October issue of The Gavin Report, "Love on the Line" was one of the Correspondents Preferred Picks in Black Radio. Both "Love on the Line" by Murdock and "Only You" by Marilyn Scott were the only picks out of the nine who had been picks previously. "Superstar" was also a highlight at KNOW in Austin, Texas, WBMX-FM in Chicago, Illinois, WDMT in Cleveland, Ohio, and WDKX in Rochester, New York where it was at #10.

The single's airplay progress was recorded in the Radio & Records 14 October issue. In the Midwest it was on playlist of WCGI in Chicago where along with Herbie Hancock, Rufus & Chaka, Rick James and Anita Baker, hers was one of the hottest. It was also added to the playlist of WKWM in Grand Rapids, WWWS in Saginaw, and KMJM in St. Louis. In the South it was added to the playlists of WOIC in Columbia, WPDQ in Jacksonville, WVOL in Nashville and WWDM in Sumpter.

=== Canada ===
Along with "Dr. Heckyll & Mr. Jive" by Men at Work, "Unconditional Love" by Donna Summer and "Uptown Girl" by Billy Joel, it was recorded as a Breakout in the 6 October issue of RPM Weekly. It was also at 5–15 on CKOI-FM in Montreal.

=== UK ===
On the week of 24 September, Music Week reported that it was a bubbler, one of the recent breakers now bubbling under the national airplay grid.

On the week of 29 October, Music Week reported that the single had gone up from eight logged in plays to ten on Radio 1. It was also on the A list of seventeen stations in the South East, South West, East and Midlands areas, and the A list of thirteen stations in the North, Northeast, Northwest, Wales and Northern Ireland areas.

=== Europe ===
As reported by Euro Tip Sheet in the publication's 30 April 1984 issue, with her name spelt as Lidia, her single was one of the Best Moving Singles of the Week at radio station Europe 1.

== Chart performance ==
=== US ===
On the week of 7 October 1983, "Superstar" made its debut at no. 36 on the Radio & Records National Airplay / 40 chart. It held that position for another week before exiting.

It was reported in the 1 October issue of Cash Box that the single was one of the Records to Watch in the Jukebox Programmer section. The single also debuted at no. 85 in the Cash Box Top 100 Black Contemporary Singles chart. The following week, it was still one of the Records to Watch in the Jukebox Programmer section. On the week of 29 October in its fifth charting week, it peaked at no. 47. It held that position for one more week before exiting at no. 97 on week seven on 12 November.

=== Canada ===
The single made its debut at no. 50 in the RPM Weekly 50 Singles chart on the week of 8 October. At week seven on the week of 19 November it reached its peak position of no. 26 and held that spot for another week.

=== UK ===
On the main chart, the single made its debut on 17 September and spending ten weeks in the charts, it peaked at no. 14.

On the week of 24 September, the single debuted at no. 65 on the Music Week 7&12 Inch Top 75 Singles chart.

On the week of 29 October, in its eighth charting week, the single peaked at no. 4 in the Music Week Top Disco & Dance singles chart. The magazine also reported that Murdoch and Curtis Hairston were serious challengers to Lionel Richie's single.

== Award ==
Murdock's single won her an award. She came fourth in the Cash Box 1983 Black Contemporary Singles Awards New Female section with Diane Richards, Madonna, Alfie Silas and Pamela Nivens at 1, 2, 3 and 5 respectively.
