= Catch the Beat (song) =

Song by T-Ski Valley

from the album In The 80's
- A-side: "Catch the Beat"
- B-side: "Catch The Groove"
- Released: 1981
- Studio: Blank Tape
- Label: Grand Groove
- Composers: B. Osborne, T. Cox
- Producers: Brad Osborne; Glen Adams (uncredited)

"Catch the Beat" is an early song for rapper T-Ski Valley. It was a hit for him in 1981. Over the years it has been sampled by many artists as well as charting with remixing and new titles.

== Background ==
The song came about as a result of T-Ski Valley who was known as Tyrone in the early days being hired to set up the break beat section at the back of the store run by Brad Osborne. After asking Osborne if he could record some hip hop songs, Osborne booked Tyrone some time with Bob Blank's Blank Tape Studios. This was the same the studio where some early rap and disco artists such as Musique and the Salsoul Orchestra made their recordings. The single that emerged from Tyrone's recording session was "Catch the Beat" by T-Ski Valley. Produced by Brad Osborne, the song was released in the US on Grand Groove GG 7701.

"Catch the Beat" uses a sample from "Heartbeat" by Taana Gardner.

It has been sampled in at least 82 recordings. The song "Over" by will.i.am which appears on his Songs About Girls album uses a sample of "Catch the Beat".

== Reception ==
In an article by Stuart Baker in Hot Stuff magazine issue #11, "Catch the Beat" was referred to as a groundbreaking rap song. Like "The Breaks" by Curtis Blow, it is an early rap favorite, the track has been described as a huge hit in the black community. According to Piccadilly Records, the song captures the post disco Bronx era of Rap.

In 2002 a remix by Dimitri from Paris, "Catch the Beat (Dimi's & Mousse T.'s Old School Mix)" bw "Catch the Beat (Bibi Better Days Mix)", "Catch The Beat (Acapella)" was released on Peppermint Jam PJMS0063. The editor of The Beat Box, Hot Plate section (Billboard 20 July) wrote that it was "cleverly reworked by Dimitri From Paris and Mousse T." and they had "collectively infused it with an old-school contemporary feel".

== Hit ==
The song has been described as an underground hit. and according to the 31 August 1981 issue of Cash Box, "Catch the Beat" was in the East Coast Dance Music Top Ten for the week of 1 August 1981. As reported by Record World in the 12 December 1981 issue, the New York area hit "Catch the Beat" was continuing to sell well.

== Later years ==
In 1984, "Catch the Beat (Scratch the Beat)" was released on Master Mix 12CHE 8409 as well as BMC 3597. A hit in the UK, it spent ten weeks on the Record Mirror disco chart, peaking at no. 33. It re-emerged on the Disco Top 85 chart at no. 75. It stayed in the chart for one more week.
