= Here Comes the Hotstepper =

1994 single by Ini Kamoze

Single by Ini Kamoze

from the album Here Comes the Hotstepper and Prêt-à-Porter
- Released: Mid-1994
- Recorded: Early 1992
- Genre: Hip hop; reggae; funk
- Length: 4:13
- Label: Columbia
- Songwriters: Ini Kamoze; Chris Kenner; Kenton Nix; Salaam Remi
- Producer: Salaam Remi

Ini Kamoze singles chronology
"Hill and Gully Ride" (1992)	"Here Comes the Hotstepper" (1994)	"Listen Me Tic (Woyoi)" (1995)

"Here Comes the Hotstepper" is a song co-written and recorded by Jamaican dancehall artist Ini Kamoze. It was released in 1994 by Columbia Records as the lead single from his 1995 album of the same name as well as the soundtrack to the film Prêt-à-Porter. It is known for its "naaaa na na na naaaa..." chorus inspired by the Cannibal and the Headhunters version of "Land of 1000 Dances".

The song was Kamoze's only song to reach the top 40 on the US Billboard Hot 100, peaking at number one on 17 December 1994 and remaining there for two weeks. It also became a number-one hit in Denmark, New Zealand, and Zimbabwe and a top-10 hit in 13 other countries. The accompanying music video received heavy rotation on European music television channels. Irish DJ John Gibbons made a remix of the song in 2018.

== Background and release ==
"Here Comes the Hotstepper" was originally recorded in early 1992 and was passed over by several labels. In 1993, Columbia Records licensed the rights to the song with the intent of including it on their reggae-dancehall compilation album Stir It Up. However, the album didn't get released before 1994. After the song started climbing on the US Billboard Hot 100 in late 1994, Ini Kamoze was at the center of a bidding war among labels wanting to sign him. The song had not been intended for a single release when Stir It Up was issued, but in the summer of 1994, Columbia decided to remix it and release it as a single. Producer Salaam Remi added a sample from "Heartbeat" by Taana Gardner from 1981. He told Billboard magazine, "I wanted to put in something familiar, so I added that sample. It just fit right into the existing groove, and made the whole song more marketable." It was issued by Columbia as a vinyl promo to college and commercial urban radio stations in August 1994 and in October, the new remix was included on the Stir It Up compilation. In December same year, "Here Comes the Hotstepper" was featured on Robert Altman's film Prêt-à-Porter.

== Critical reception ==
Stephen Thomas Erlewine from AllMusic noted that the song "lifts a line from 'Land of 1000 Dances', and places it on an infectious dancehall beat – it's a great single that deserved to be a huge hit." Larry Flick from Billboard magazine wrote, "Reggae-splashed pop/hip-hopper is fueled by a prominent sample of Taana Gardner's disco chestnut 'Heartbeat'. Already getting active attention, infectious party jam percolates with innocuous but appealing rapping and familiar chants. Don't be surprised if this sleeper soars past the expected hits to the top of the Hot 100." In his weekly UK chart commentary, James Masterton stated that the "infectious dance track owes much of its success to the 'Na Na Na Na Na' hook". Music & Media commented, "Let's go "funkin' for Jamaica" again. Included on the OST Prêt-à-Porter, the veteran reggae man unexpectedly sees himself in the US top 10 with a chunk of '80s fatback funk." British magazine Music Week's RM Dance Update complimented the song as a "catchy funk anthem doing the business in the US".

RM editor James Hamilton described it as a "lyrical gangster's madly infectious US smash reggae jiggler using the 'naa na-na-naa' chant from 'Land of a 1000 Dances'" in his weekly dance column. Pete Stanton from Smash Hits named it a highlight from the Prêt-à-Porter soundtrack. Charles Aaron from Spin viewed it as a "seamless, nonsensical string of ragamuffin hip-hop clichés." He added further, "Rivaling Joey Gardner's sample constructions for K7 [with 'Come Baby Come'], producer Salaam Remi drops in the bass line from Taana Gardner's 1981 club classic [...], and next thing you know, you're humming "murderer" against your will. Kamoze is a Kingston native, a vet of four supposedly respectable albums, an author and playwright, but on this Top Ten hit, he could be Jah Blatt from down the block. Deeply disposable." Steve Pick from St. Louis Post-Dispatch wrote, "With this cut, he's distilled most of the stylistic variants of his competitors, sweetened them with some goof hooks and come up with a breakthrough pop record that threatens to keep folks dancing for the next several years. I'm not sure what's "Heartical" about this version, but this is the mix you want."

== Chart performance ==
"Here Comes the Hotstepper" remains Kamoze's biggest hit to date. It went to number one on the US Billboard Hot 100 and on the Canadian RPM Dance/Urban chart, while peaking at number two at the US Cash Box Top 100. In Europe, it peaked at number one in Denmark as well as on the Eurochart Hot 100. The single climbed into the top 10 in Austria, Belgium (Flanders and Wallonia), Finland, France, Germany, Iceland, Ireland, Norway, Spain, Sweden, Switzerland, and the United Kingdom. In the latter nation, it peaked at number four during its third week on the UK Singles Chart, on 15 January 1995, and spent four weeks at that position, topping the UK R&B Chart in the process. Elsewhere, "Here Comes the Hotstepper" topped the charts in New Zealand and Zimbabwe and peaked at number two in Australia. The single was awarded with a gold record in France and Germany and a platinum record in Australia, New Zealand, the UK, and the US.

== Usages of music sampling ==
"Here Comes the Hotstepper" contains several samples, including vocals from "The Champ" by The Mohawks, "Hot Pants" by Bobby Byrd, and "La Di Da Di" by Doug E. Fresh and Slick Rick. The song's instrumental samples the drums and bass from "Heartbeat" by Taana Gardner and guitar notes from "Hung Up on My Baby" by Isaac Hayes. The song uses the "na na na na na..." chorus from the Cannibal and the Headhunters version of "Land of a Thousand Dances," and the verse vocal melody is reminiscent of The Beatles' "Come Together", which was inspired by Chuck Berry's "You Can't Catch Me".

== Music video ==
Two music videos were made to accompany the song. The remix version used various scenes from the film Prêt-à-Porter. It received heavy rotation on MTV Europe and was A-listed on both French and German music television channels MCM and VIVA in February 1995. Same month, "Here Comes the Hotstepper" was a Box Top on British The Box.

== Impact and legacy ==
In 2005, Blender ranked "Here Comes the Hotstepper" number 492 in their list of "The 500 Greatest Songs Since You Were Born". In 2017, BuzzFeed ranked it number 46 in their "The 101 Greatest Dance Songs of the '90s". In 2019, Billboard ranked "Here Comes the Hotstepper" number 126 in their list of "Billboard's Top Songs of the '90s". Time Out ranked it number 67 in their "The 100 Best Party Songs Ever Made" in July 2023.

In 2020, American singer Nicky Jam and Puerto Rican rapper Daddy Yankee interpolated the song's hook for the single "Muévelo", from the Bad Boys for Life soundtrack, as did Israeli musical duo Static & Ben El for their single "Further Up (Na, Na, Na, Na, Na)" alongside American rapper Pitbull. That same year, Parquet Courts frontman and artist A. Savage designed a t-shirt, Excuse Me Mister Officer (Murderer), named for a line in the song's pre-chorus, to honor victims of police brutality, the proceeds from which he donated to various US- and New York-based anti-prison organizations.

In Extreme Championship Wrestling, the famous entrance of tag team The Public Enemy (not to be confused with the rap group of the same name) included "Here Comes the Hotstepper".

== Track listings ==
- Jamaican 7-inch single
- US cassette single
- European CD single
1. "Here Comes the Hotstepper" (Heartical mix)
2. "Here Comes the Hotstepper" (Allaam mix)
- US 12-inch and maxi-cassette single
- UK CD and 12-inch single
- Australian CD and cassette single
1. "Here Comes the Hotstepper" (Heartical mix) – 3:51
2. "Here Comes the Hotstepper" (Heartipella) – 4:12
3. "Here Comes the Hotstepper" (Heartimental) – 4:11
4. "Here Comes the Hotstepper" (Allaam mix) – 4:34
5. "Here Comes the Hotstepper" (Allaamental) – 4:34
6. "Here Comes the Hotstepper" (LP version) – 4:09
- UK cassette single
1. "Here Comes the Hotstepper" (Heartical mix)
2. "Here Comes the Hotstepper" (Heartimental)

== Charts ==
=== Weekly charts ===
Weekly chart performance for "Here Comes the Hotstepper"
Chart (1994–1995)	Peak position
Australia (ARIA)	2
Austria (Ö3 Austria Top 40)	6
Belgium (Ultratop 50 Flanders)	3
Belgium (Ultratop 50 Wallonia)	3
Belgium (VRT Top 30 Flanders)	4
Canada Top Singles (RPM)	15
Canada Dance/Urban (RPM)	1
Denmark (IFPI)	1
Europe (Eurochart Hot 100)	1
Europe (European Dance Radio)	1
Europe (European Hit Radio)	4
Finland (Suomen virallinen lista)	2
France (SNEP)	2
Germany (GfK)	6
Iceland (Íslenski Listinn Topp 40)	3
Ireland (IRMA)	3
Israel (Israeli Singles Chart)	9
Italy Airplay (Music & Media)	2
Netherlands (Dutch Top 40)	22
Netherlands (Single Top 100)	16
New Zealand (Recorded Music NZ)	1
Norway (VG-lista)	4
Poland Airplay (Music & Media)	11
Quebec (ADISQ)	18
Scottish Singles Sales (Official Charts)	6
Spain (AFYVE)	2
Sweden (Sverigetopplistan)	5
Switzerland (Schweizer Hitparade)	4
UK Singles (Official Charts)	4
UK Dance (Official Charts)	3
UK Hip Hop/R&B (Official Charts)	1
UK Club Chart (Music Week)	42
UK Pop Tip Club Chart (Music Week)	10
US Billboard Hot 100	1
US Dance Club Songs (Billboard)	22
US Dance Singles Sales (Billboard)	1
US Hot R&B/Hip-Hop Songs (Billboard)	2
US Pop Airplay (Billboard)	5
US Rhythmic Airplay (Billboard)	1
US Cash Box Top 100	2
Zimbabwe (ZIMA)	1

Chart (2022)	Peak position
Hungary (Single Top 40)	23

=== Year-end charts ===
Chart (1994)	Position
US Billboard Hot 100	85
US Hot R&B Singles (Billboard)	45
US Maxi-Singles Sales (Billboard)	9
US Urban Singles (Cash Box)	48

Chart (1995)	Position
Australia (ARIA)	22
Austria (Ö3 Austria Top 40)	26
Belgium (Ultratop 50 Flanders)	38
Belgium (Ultratop 50 Wallonia)	7
Brazil (Crowley)	64
Canada Dance/Urban (RPM)	22
Europe (Eurochart Hot 100)	15
Europe (European Hit Radio)	16
France (SNEP)	9
Germany (Media Control)	29
New Zealand (RIANZ)	8
Sweden (Topplistan)	32
Switzerland (Schweizer Hitparade)	18
UK Singles (OCC)	24
US Billboard Hot 100	24
US Hot R&B Singles (Billboard)	49
US Maxi-Singles Sales (Billboard)	44
US Top 40/Mainstream (Billboard)	30
US Top 40/Rhythm-Crossover (Billboard)	15
US Cash Box Top 100	25

=== Decade-end charts ===
Chart (1990–1999)	Position
US Billboard Hot 100	65

== Certifications ==
Region	Certification	Certified units/sales
Australia (ARIA)	Platinum	70,000^{^}
France (SNEP)	Gold	250,000^{*}
Germany (BVMI)	Gold	250,000^{^}
New Zealand (RMNZ)	2× Platinum	60,000^{‡}
United Kingdom (BPI)	Platinum	600,000^{‡}
United States (RIAA)	2× Platinum	2,000,000^{‡}
^{*} Sales figures based on certification alone.^{^} Shipments figures based on certification alone.^{‡} Sales+streaming figures based on certification alone.

== Release history ==
Region	Date	Format(s)	Label(s)	Ref.
United States	Mid-1994	12-inch vinyl; cassette	Columbia	
United States	August 1994	College; urban radio	Columbia	
Australia	21 November 1994	CD; cassette	Columbia	
United Kingdom	1 January 1995	12-inch vinyl; CD; cassette	Columbia	
Japan	1 June 1995	CD	Sony	

== Cover versions and usage in media ==
A cover of the song by The Hit Crew was used in the game Just Dance 2.

John Gibbons covered the song as "Hotstepper" in 2019. The song charted at no. 67 on the Irish Singles Chart.

In 2021, Philadelphia-based musician and social media personality Pat Finnerty enlisted Dr. Dog to cover the track for the "Hey, Soul Sister" episode of his YouTube series, What Makes This Song Stink.

The song was included in the 2022 film, Sonic the Hedgehog 2, and plays during a scene where the titular character is left home alone.

It was included in the launch trailer for the video game Yakuza: Like a Dragon.
