= Brother to Brother (musical group) =

American music group

- Origin: United States
- Genres: Soul, funk, disco
- Years active: 1974 - ?
- Labels: Win Or Lose, Turbo Records, Sugar Hill Records, Philips Records, All Platinum, Unidisc
- Past members: Michael Burton; Billy Jones; Frankie Prescott; Yogi Horton

Brother to Brother was an American musical group fronted by Michael Burton who had three hits during the 1970s. They had a hit on the Billboard Hot 100 with their version of Gil Scott-Heron's song "The Bottle".

== Background ==
The ensemble was formed in 1974 by Michael Burton. Musicians in the group included Billy Jones, Frankie Prescott, and Yogi Horton.

Besides "The Bottle", the group had hits with "Let Your Mind Be Free" and "Chance with You".

== Career ==
It was reported by Cash Box in the magazine's 13 July issue that their single "In the Bottle" was selling well and was beginning to have strong airplay.

On the week of 28 September, having been in the Billboard Hot Soul Singles chart for ten weeks, the single reached no. 10. The following week it peaked at no. 9. It also debuted at no. 93 on the Billboard Hot 100 that week. There was also a full-page ad on page 57 that their In the Bottle album had been released on Turbo 7013.

The group's album In the Bottle was reviewed in the 15 January 1975 issue of Walrus. The reviewer said that the group murdered "I Wish It Would Rain" but they established a grasp on modern r&b, and they led the way with the first and third tracks on both sides. It was also one of the hottest LPs in New York according to Jeff Teitelbaum. Also that week, Walrus noted that their song "In the Bottle was getting heavy airplay at KTYD in Santa Barbara, California.

In February 1976 they had some chart success with "Let Your Mind Be Free" which remained in the charts for eight weeks. Later that year, they had more success with "Chance with You" which spent eleven weeks in the charts.

They recorded their album Let Your Mind Be Free which was released on All Platinum 7015. It made it into the Cash Box Top 50 R&B albums chart. At week nine on 24 July 1976, it peaked at no. 33.

They recorded an album Brother 2 Brother which was released on Sugar Hill Records H 259 in 1980.

== Later years ==
Michael Burton wrote and produced the song "Superstar for Lydia Murdock which was released in 1983. The song is an answer to Michael Jackson's hit "Billie Jean". The singer takes the place of Billie Jean and tells her side of the story. It made it to no. 47 on the Cash Box Top 100 Black Contemporary Singles chart. It also charted in UK on the main chart, making it to no. 14 and charting for ten weeks during its run. And working with Gerry Gabinelli, Bobby Eli, and Tony Bongiovi, he also produced her other single "Love on the Line. It got to no. 55 on the Record Mirror UK Disco Top 85 chart, and no. 48 on the Music Week Top Disco & Dance chart.
