= Secret Evil =

Studio album by Jessica Hernandez & the Deltas
- Released: August 19, 2014
- Label: Instant Records

Secret Evil is the debut studio album by American soul/pop band Jessica Hernandez & the Deltas. It was released on August 19, 2014 through Instant Records after a two-year delay due to a record company merger.

== Critical reception ==
Professional ratings
Aggregate scores
Source	Rating
Metacritic	83/100
Review scores
Source	Rating
AllMusic	3.5/5 stars
American Songwriter	3.5/5 stars
Pop Matters	9/10 stars
Glide Magazine	7/10 stars
antiquiet	4.5/5 stars

Secret Evil received positive reviews from music critics. Cole Waterman from Pop Matters says Secret Evil is "one of 2014’s most deftly sequenced, produced, written and performed albums." Jim Vorel of Paste Magazine calls Jessica Hernandez "an ascendant star." Kevin "Skwerl" Cogill of antiquiet seemed blown away by the album saying, "every once in awhile, something indisputably special wanders into our yard and stops us dead in our tracks."

== Track listing ==
No.	Title	Length
1.	"No Place Left to Hide"	2:54
2.	"Sorry I Stole Your Man"	3:36
3.	"Cry Cry Cry"	3:14
4.	"Dead Brains"	3:36
5.	"Tired Oak"	3:27
6.	"Over"	3:09
7.	"Caught Up"	3:00
8.	"Neck Tattoo"	3:55
9.	"Run Run Run"	3:34
10.	"Downtown Man"	3:56
11.	"Lovers First"	4:02
Total length:		38:23
