= Heartbeat (Taana Gardner song) =

1981 single by Taana Gardner

Single by Taana Gardner
- Released: 1981
- Genre: Post-disco
- Length: 9:34 (Club Version)
- Label: West End WES-22132 (US)
- Songwriter: Kenton Nix
- Producer: Kenton Nix

Taana Gardner singles chronology
"When You Touch Me" (1979)	"Heartbeat" (1981)	"No Frills" (1981)

"Heartbeat" is a song by American disco singer Taana Gardner, released in 1981 by West End Records. It was arranged by Dennis Weeden and Kenton Nix, and released with the more famous club mix created by Larry Levan. The single peaked at No. 10 on the US Billboard R&B Singles chart and No. 6 on the Billboard Hot Dance Club Play chart. In 1998, it had sold over 800,000 copies. In 2022, Rolling Stone ranked "Heartbeat" number 63 in their list of the "200 Greatest Dance Songs of All Time".

== Composition ==
"Heartbeat" is a post-disco song, which runs for 9 minutes and 34 seconds for the 12-inch "Club version" mixed by Levan. It is set in common time and has a tempo of 100 beats per minute. Despite praise for its "hip-shaking, booty-bumpin' beats and rhythms" and hook-laden lyrics, it was considered peculiar at the time due to its slow tempo, "dizzy" vocal delivery and dissonant accompaniment. Danny Krivit recalls "When [Levan] put ["Heartbeat"] on, a full club of people left the room to get food. There was not one person left on the floor." Levan, known for his musical idiosyncrasies, kept playing the record at the Paradise Garage even several times in an evening until weeks later "no one [was] off the floor when they played ["Heartbeat"]." Because of its atypical "dance music-hostile" tempo numerous DJs find it unsuitable for dancefloors even today.

== Reception ==
In his consumer guide for The Village Voice, Robert Christgau reviewed the song's 12-inch release in 1981 and gave it an A rating, indicating "a great record both of whose sides offer enduring pleasure and surprise." He dubbed it a "classic one-shot" and "the hottest r&b record in the city right now for two self-evident reasons", stating:

First is the beat, which is like what it says only deeper and more deliberate (in the drums and handclaps) with palpitations (provided by a slow-humping bass). Second is Taana, who'd combine the melodic dislocations of Esther Phillips and the girlish screech of Diana Ross if she had the technical control of either. Because she doesn't, she also recalls another timbre-sister, Shirley Goodman (of & Lee and 'Shame, Shame, Shame'). First I played the 6:30-minute 'party' version; now I prefer the 9:34-minute 'club' version. One-shot, eh?

— Robert Christgau

AllMusic editor Andy Kellman found the song's rhythm "instantly memorable" and recognized its widespread sampling by hip hop producers, stating "Though hip hop fans are just as familiar with that bass line – often put to great use after its original recording — as rock fans are familiar with the guitar riffs of 'Purple Haze,' no song that has referenced 'Heartbeat' comes close to matching it." Kellman also writes that the song's "greatness comes down to Gardner's vocals just as much as that rhythm", stating:

Her typically sweet delivery knows when to coo and when to growl at all the right moments, riding atop the wave of bass, drums, handclaps, and unobtrusive synth lines that twinkle and zap. Few vocal turns have conveyed the butterflies of love better than this one; in fact, the repeated refrain of 'Heartbeat, it makes me feel so weak' sticks in the head just as much as any other element of the song. Without a doubt – and with or without its status as a constant sampling source – 'Heartbeat' is one of the best pop singles of the ‘80s.

— Andy Kellman

== Legacy ==
In October 2000, VH1 ranked "Heartbeat" number 90 in their list of "100 Greatest Dance Songs". In 2019, Spin ranked it among "The 30 Best Disco Songs That Every Millennial Should Know". In 2020, Slant Magazine ranked it number 12 in their list of "The 100 Best Dance Songs of All Time". In 2022, Rolling Stone ranked it number 63 in their list of the "200 Greatest Dance Songs of All Time".

== Track listing ==
- US: West End / WES-22132

Side A
No.	Title	Version	Length
1.	"Heartbeat"	Club Version	9:34

Side B
No.	Title	Version	Length
1.	"Heartbeat"	Party Version	6:30

== Influence ==
"Heartbeat" has been extensively sampled in Hip hop music, pop music and dance music:

- Treacherous Three sampled "Heartbeat" for 1981 Rap song "Feel the Heartbeat". On "Enjoy Records".
- T-Ski Valley sampled "Heartbeat" for his 1981 Rap song "Catch The Beat". On "Grand Groove Records".
- De La Soul sampled "Heartbeat" for the remixed version of 1989 single "Buddy".
- Eazy-E sampled "Heartbeat" for "Radio" (1988).
- Ini Kamoze sampled "Heartbeat" for his song "Here Comes The Hotstepper", a #1 song on the American pop charts in December 1994.
- D'Influence sampled "Heartbeat" for their remix of "Crazy" by Mark Morrison, which peaked at #6 on the UK Singles Chart in 1996.
- Musiq Soulchild sampled De La Soul's "Buddy (Native Tongues Decision Remix)", and interpolations from the composition "Heartbeat (Kenton Mix)" for his song "B.U.D.D.Y.".
- Norwegian pop singer Annie based her song "I Will Get On" on Gardner's song "Heartbeat".
- DMX sampled "Heartbeat" for the song entitled "It's All Good (Love My Niggas)" (1998).
- Mack 10 sampled "Heartbeat" for his 1998 song, "LBC and the ING", which features Snoop Dogg on the album The Recipe.
- Black Moon sampled "Heartbeat" for "Two Turntables and a Mic" in 1999.
- JX sampled "Heartbeat" for "There's Nothing I Won't Do" (1996).
- Nationwide Rip Ridaz sampled the whole song on the track titled "Better Watch Your Back (Fucc Slob)".
- SWV sampled "Heartbeat" for the "You're the One" Allstar Remix.
- The song appeared in the film 3 Strikes and the film True Love.
- araabMUZIK sampled and remixed "Heartbeat" on his 2013 instrumental compilation album "The Remixes, Vol. 1".
- The song has also been featured on the oldies Funk station "Space 103.2" in the big hit video game Grand Theft Auto V.
- Dutch house duo Homework sampled "Heartbeat" on their 2011 track Hudson Square.
- Blacksmith sampled "Heartbeat" on their 1998 remix of Tina Moore - Nobody Better (Blacksmith R'n'B Rub).
- Shinehead sampled "Heartbeat" on his 1992 "Try My Love"
- Heavy D & the Boyz sampled “Heartbeat” on their song “Something Goin’ On” from their 1994 album “Nuttin’ But Love”

== Cover versions ==
- In 1990, Seduction (featuring April Harris on lead vocals) recorded the song peaking at number two on the US dance chart. This version also peaked at number twenty-one on the soul chart and number thirteen on the Hot 100. A music video for this version was directed by Michael Bay and produced by Propaganda Films.

== Charts ==
=== Taana Gardner version ===
Chart (1981)	Peak position
US R&B Singles (Billboard)	10
US Hot Dance Music/Club Play (Billboard)	6

=== Seduction version ===
Chart (1990)	Peak position
Australia (ARIA)	169
US Billboard Hot 100	13
US Hot Dance Music/Club Play (Billboard)	2
US R&B Singles (Billboard)	21

== See also ==
- List of post-disco artists and songs
