= Ini Kamoze =

Jamaican reggae artist (born 1957)

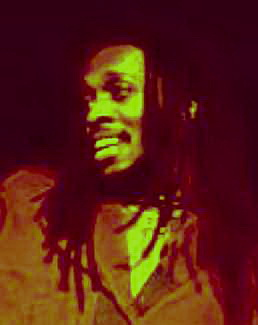
- Ini Kamoze in 1998

Background information
- Born: Cecil Campbell; 9 October 1957 (age 68); Saint Mary, Jamaica
- Genres: Reggae; dancehall; reggae fusion
- Occupation: Singer
- Instrument: Vocals
- Years active: 1981–present
- Labels: 9 SoundClik; Columbia; Sony; EastWest; Mango; Island; TAXI
- Website: inikamoze.com

Ini Kamoze (/ˈaɪni kəˈmoʊzi/ EYE-nee kə-MOH-zee, born Cecil Campbell; 9 October 1957) is a Jamaican reggae singer who began his career in the early 1980s and rose to prominence in 1994 with the signature song "Here Comes the Hotstepper". The single topped the US Billboard Hot 100 as well as charts in Denmark and New Zealand, reaching No. 4 on the UK Singles Chart.

== Career ==
=== Early work ===
Ini Kamoze, whose stage name means "mountain of the true God", made his first single, "World Affairs", in 1981, and he followed it with "Trouble You a Trouble Me"/"General" in 1983. His self-titled debut album came out in 1984 as a six-track mini-LP on Island Records. In the album notes, he describes himself as a "pencil thin... disentangled... six-foot vegetarian". The record included the song "World a Music (Out in the Streets They Call It Merther)", which was later sampled by Damian Marley on his 2005 hit "Welcome to Jamrock". The album was recorded with and produced by Sly and Robbie, with whom Kamoze also toured internationally, along with Yellowman and Half Pint. By 1988, however, Kamoze had effectively disappeared from the music scene following lukewarm reactions to his intermittent releases. In 1989, his single "Stress" appeared on the compilation album Selekta Showcase. In 1992, he issued the greatest hits album 16 Vibes of Ini Kamoze.

=== "Here Comes the Hotstepper" ===
In 1994, Kamoze released the song that would become his signature hit, "Here Comes the Hotstepper". Adopting the nickname from the song title, Kamoze would become known as the "Hotstepper", from the Jamaican Patois for a man on the run from the law. The song was originally recorded with Philip "Fatis" Burrell and later remixed by Salaam Remi and initially featured on a reggae music compilation titled Stir It Up, released by Epic. It was later included on Kamoze's album of the same name in 1995. "Here Comes the Hotstepper" was not an entirely new composition, having roots in the song "Land of 1000 Dances", which was a No. 1 R&B hit for Wilson Pickett in 1966 and was first recorded by Chris Kenner in 1962 and reprised in 1963 by Fats Domino. The remixed version of the track also incorporates the bass line from Taana Gardner's 1981 single "Heartbeat". The song appeared on the soundtrack to the 1994 fashion-industry satire film Prêt-à-Porter. "Here Comes the Hotstepper" remains Kamoze's only US No. 1 hit. The success of the single sparked an intense bidding war, with several major labels hoping to sign Kamoze. He went on to sign a seven-album deal with Elektra Records in November 1994.

=== Later work ===
Kamoze's career after this high-water mark featured the compilation album Here Comes the Hotstepper, released in 1995 by Columbia Records (against Kamoze's wishes), around the same time as his first album for Elektra, Lyrical Gangsta.

In 2005, Kamoze released the double album Debut on his own 9 Sound Clik label, on which he re-recorded a number of tracks from earlier in his career.

In 2009, Kamoze published 51 50 Rule, which includes guest contributions from Maya Azucena ("Rapunzel"), Sizzla ("R.A.W"), and Busy Signal ("Ta Da Bang").

The artist's most recent album release is 2016's Ini Kamoze Meets Xterminator: Tramplin' Down Babylon, a collection of newly and previously recorded tracks that were originally issued as singles on Xterminator Records by producer Burrell.

Kamoze has also written a book on the history of the Jamaican city Port Royal, and a play, Runnings.

== Discography ==
=== Albums ===
Studio albums

- Ini Kamoze (1984)
- Statement (1984)
- Pirate (1986)
- Shocking Out (1988)
- Here Comes the Hotstepper (1995)
- Lyrical Gangsta (1995)
- Debut (2006)
- 51 50 Rule (2009)
- Ini Kamoze meets Xterminator: Tramplin' Down Babylon (2016)

Compilations

- 16 Vibes of Ini Kamoze (1992)

=== Singles ===
List of singles, with selected chart positions
Title	Year	Peak positions										Certifications	Album
Title	Year	AUS	AUT	BEL (FL)	FRA	NED	NZ	SWE	SWI	UK	US	Certifications	Album
"World Affairs"	1981	—	—	—	—	—	—	—	—	—	—		Non-album single
"Trouble You a Trouble Me"	1983	—	—	—	—	—	—	—	—	—	—		Ini Kamoze
"World a Music"	1983	—	—	—	—	—	—	—	—	—	—		Ini Kamoze
"Call the Police"	1985	—	—	—	—	—	—	—	—	—	—		Statement
"Pirate"	1986	—	—	—	—	—	—	—	—	—	—		Pirate
"Here Comes the Hotstepper"	1994	2	6	3	2	16	1	5	4	4	1	RIAA: 2× Platinum; ARIA: Platinum; BPI: Platinum; BVMI: Gold; RMNZ: 2× Platinum; SNEP: Gold	Here Comes the Hotstepper
"Listen Me Tic (Woyoi)"	1995	—	—	—	—	—	—	—	—	—	88		Lyrical Gangsta

== See also ==
- Music of Jamaica
- List of reggae musicians
- List of roots reggae artists
- List of artists who reached number one in the United States
- List of 1990s one-hit wonders in the United States
- Hot 100 No. 1 Hits of 1994
