= Reggae with The Hippy Boys =

Reggae With The Hippy Boys

Studio album by The Hippy Boys
- Released: 1969
- Genre: Reggae
- Label: High Note
- Producer: Sonia Pottinger

Reggae With The Hippy Boys is an album by The Hippy Boys, released in 1969. Originally Issued by Trojan records, the album was classified in the style of Skinhead Reggae. The Original LP has long become a highly sought-after collector's item.

== Track listing ==
1. "Nurse J'kel"
2. "This Is It"
3. "Mad Movie"
4. "Capo"
5. "Footwork"
6. "Seven Heaven"
7. "Moon Walk"
8. "Challenge"
9. "Spicy"
10. "Wondering"
