= Jessica Hernandez & the Deltas =

American soul/pop band

- Origin: Detroit, Michigan, U.S.
- Genres: Soul/Pop
- Years active: 2010–present
- Label: Instant Records (2014–present)
- Members: Jessica Hernandez; Steve Lehane; Taylor Pierson; John Raleeh; Kevin Medina
- Website: JessicaHernandezandTheDeltas.com

Jessica Hernandez & the Deltas is an American soul/pop band from Detroit, Michigan, United States, formed in 2010 and consists of lead singer Jessica Hernandez and her band The Deltas.

== History ==
Jessica Hernandez grew up in West Bloomfield, an affluent suburb of Detroit. She is the daughter of a Detroit-born Mexican-American mother and Cuban immigrant father. Her parents lived above her family's restaurant before she was born, and she worked in the family's Mexicantown Bakery from third grade. She sang in choirs starting in grade school and performed in theater in high school. While in college in Chicago she started singing in rock bands. By 2009, she was ready to start a band. The band name originated from the suggestion of a former drummer who had a 1987 Delta car.

After self-releasing the album Weird Looking Women In Too Many Clothes Jessica Hernandez signed a record deal with Instant Records, and then released the Demons EP, Secret Evil album, and Deceptacon single.

Social media documents that Jessica and the band returned to the studio in 2016 to record their second album. The first track to be released as a song called "Hot Damn" that was released to fans in December 2016.

=== Secret Evil (2014) ===
Secret Evil was released on August 19, 2014. The band appeared on Late Show with David Letterman on November 10 playing the song "Sorry I Stole Your Man". They received high praise from Letterman after their performance.

On May 19, 2015, the band released a 7" single which includes "Deceptacon" (Le Tigre cover) and "Don’t Take My Man To Idaho".

=== Telephone/Teléfono (2017) ===
Telephone/Teléfono is a double record, where each song on the record is recorded in both English and Spanish. Released on June 23, the album was promoted through PledgeMusic and a nationwide tour.

=== Passing of Michael Krygier ===
Former guitarist Michael Krygier, who had recently left the band after five years of performing with them, tragically took his own life on November 13, 2017. A musical scholarship was set up in his memory.

== Members ==
Current members

- Jessica Hernandez – Vocals, Guitar, Keys, Percussion (2008–present)
- Steve Lehane – Bass, Vocals
- Taylor Pierson – Keys, Accordion, Vocals
- John Raleeh – Trombone
- Stephen Stetson – Drums
- Colin Jensen – Drums (touring)

Past members

- Michael Krygier – Guitar, Vocals (2012–2017)
- Stephen Boegehold – Drums, Bass (2010–2012)
- Adam Davis – Drums (2009–2010)
- Michael Higgins – Drums (2010–2011)
- Nick Maher – Guitar, Keys (2009–2011)
- Jake Shadik – Sax (2009–2012)
- Gordon Smith – Guitar, Vocals (2011–2013)
- Benjamin Sturley – Bass (2009–2013)

== Discography ==
=== Studio albums ===
- Secret Evil (2014)
- Telephone (2017)

=== EPs ===
- Live at the Magic Bag (2009)
- Weird Looking Women in Too Many Clothes (2010)
- Demons (2013)

=== Singles ===
- Caught Up (2013)
- No Place Left to Hide (2014)
- Sorry I Stole Your Man (2014)
- Don't Take My Man to Idaho (2015)
- Deceptacon (2015)
- Baby (2018 or 2019)
