= Bob Blank =

American music producer

- Occupations: Music producer, sound engineer
- Known for: Blank Tape Studios; Blank Productions

Bob Blank is an American music producer and prolific sound engineer who ran Blank Tape Studios which opened in New York in 1976. Artists he has worked with include, James Chance, Kid Creole, Cristina, Lizzy Mercier-Descloux, Sandra Feva, Instant Funk, Lydia Lunch, Nelson Ned, Jimmy Sabater, Sun Ra and more.

== Background ==
Bob Blank had an interest in electronics, and at the age of twelve, he built a high-frequency radio transmitter which didn't go down well with the Federal Communications Commission.

He was a guitarist, and at age eighteen he was in a local band. They made a record which was his first recording experience. He originally wanted to be a session guitarist but following his move to New York, he realized that he didn't have what it took to get in. He stayed in the music scene and started record producing and sound engineering. Working as an engineer on "To Be with You" by Jimmy Sabater proved successful as the song became a disco hit. Encouraged by the success of that he started his own studio which was called Blank Tapes. Many disco and funk recordings were done there, and it was part of the "mutant disco scene". Artists such as James Chance, Paquito D'Rivera, Lizzy Mercier-Descloux, Kid Creole and Cristina had either worked with him or had their recordings produced by him. The Vinyl Factor refers to Blank as a legendary disco producer.

Blank worked with a great number of artists during the late 1970s and early 1980s. He was referred to as a studio dynamo by Record Collector magazine. He worked on recordings which include "Planet Rock" by Afrika Bambaataa and "Ain't Nobody" by Chaka Khan.

August Darnell said that Blank's studio was a haven for creative artists, and he would try things that other engineers wouldn't dare. Along with Darnell, as a producer, Blank was connected to the ZE record label which released recordings by the Aural Exciters etc. One album featured Taana Gardner.

== Personal life ==
His former wife is Lola who had performed with James Brown. According to an article in the Schenectady Gazette, they originally met in 1979 while posing for a Kid Creole & the Coconuts album. Blank was dressed in safari attire with a pith helmet and having a fierce expression on his face. Lola was wearing a tiny leopard print dress, looking like Jane of the Tarzan films.

Having a passion for ballroom dancing, Blank has been successful competing in events with his partner Martha Estevez. He was a winner in the Senior Latin World Championships in Paris, France, in 2014. He was a featured dancer in the 2004 film The Stepford Wives, which starred Nicole Kidman and Christopher Walken. Both Blank and Martha Estevez also were featured in Serena's Song, a 2011 short which starred Michael O'Keefe and Margot Kidder and was featured at the 2011 Long Island International Film Expo.

== Career ==
=== 1970s–1980s ===
While working at Delta Recording Corp. in New York in 1974, Blank produced "Happy Birthday, My Darling" for Nelson Ned and an LP for Luis Ramirez.

Blank was the engineer on the self-titled album by Latin music ensemble Orquesta Cimarron which was released on TR Records TR 115X in 1975. It was reviewed in the 17 January 1976 issue of Record World. The album was produced by Marty Sheller and arrangements by Pupi Lagarreta, Marty Sheller, Harry Shields, Sonny Bravo, Ron Davis and Wilfredo Mullings. The good mixing by Blank was noted.

In 1978, Instant Funk's single "I Got My Mind Made Up" was released. The work in the mix by DJ Larry Levan and Bob Blank resonated throughout Manhattan and it became a hit on the R&B and disco charts, making it to no. 1 and no. 20 on the Billboard Hot 100.

Working with Lydia Lunch, Blank co-produced her Queen of Siam album which was released in 1980 on ZE ZEA 33006. It was reviewed in the 1 March 1980 issue of Cash Box. The reviewer called it an interesting album.

Blank was the engineer on "Jam to Remember" by Just Four which was released on Brad Osborne's Grand Groove record label in 1982.

Working with Tony Camillo, Blank co-produced Sandra Feva's single, "Here Now". It was released on Catawba /Macola MRC -0961 in 12" format. A recommended single in the 27 December 1986 issue of Billboard, the reviewer said it was "big, voiced chanteuse tears into a splashy, dramatic ballad".

=== 1990s–2020s ===
According to 2010 article by Clash, Blank was recording sound-alike tracks for library music and karaoke formats.

It was announced by The Quietus in an article published on 3 March 2021 that alternative mixes by Bob Blank for Sun Ra's 1978 album Lanquidity would be part of CD release and CD and 4-LP box set to be released on the Strut label on 28 May that year.

== Blank Tape Studios / Blank Productions ==
In May 1978, Musique recorded their debut album, Keep on Jumpin', at Blank Tape Studios. The album which was produced by Patrick Adams had its release in August that year. On the week of 7 October, the single, "In the Bush" / "Keep on Jumpin" was at no. 1 on the Record World Disco File Top 20 chart. It was also on the Discofile Hit Parade, on DJ Danny Krivit's playlist at Trude Heller's in New York, DJ Jeff Tilton's playlist at the Boston, Boston in Boston, and DJ Jonathan Fearing's playlist at the Xenon in New York.

"Catch the Beat" by rapper T-Ski Valley was recorded at Blank Tape Studios. It came about as a result of a young man by the name of Tyrone who was hired to work at Brad Osborne's store. Osborne booked some recording time for Tyrone at Blank Tape Studios. The result of this was the single, "Catch the Beat" by Tyrone, now going by the name of T-Ski valley. The Brad Osborne production was released in the US on Grand Groove GG 7701. It became an underground hit, and was in the East Coast Dance Music Top Ten for the week of 1 August 1981.

It was reported by Billboard in the magazine's 4 March 1989 issue that Blank Productions had Peter Moffit there, mixing his second self -produced jazz album. It was cited for release that month and Arthur Russell was finishing off his album there. Blank was working on two songs for Amy Keys which were produced by Paul Simpson. Blank had also worked on a live recorded CD by Paquito D'Rivera which featured a 16-piece string section and jazz combo.

== Discography ==
- The Blank Generation (Blank Tapes NYC 1975-1987) - Strut STRUT053LP, DJhistory.com STRUT053LP
