= List of Billboard Hot 100 number ones of 1994 =

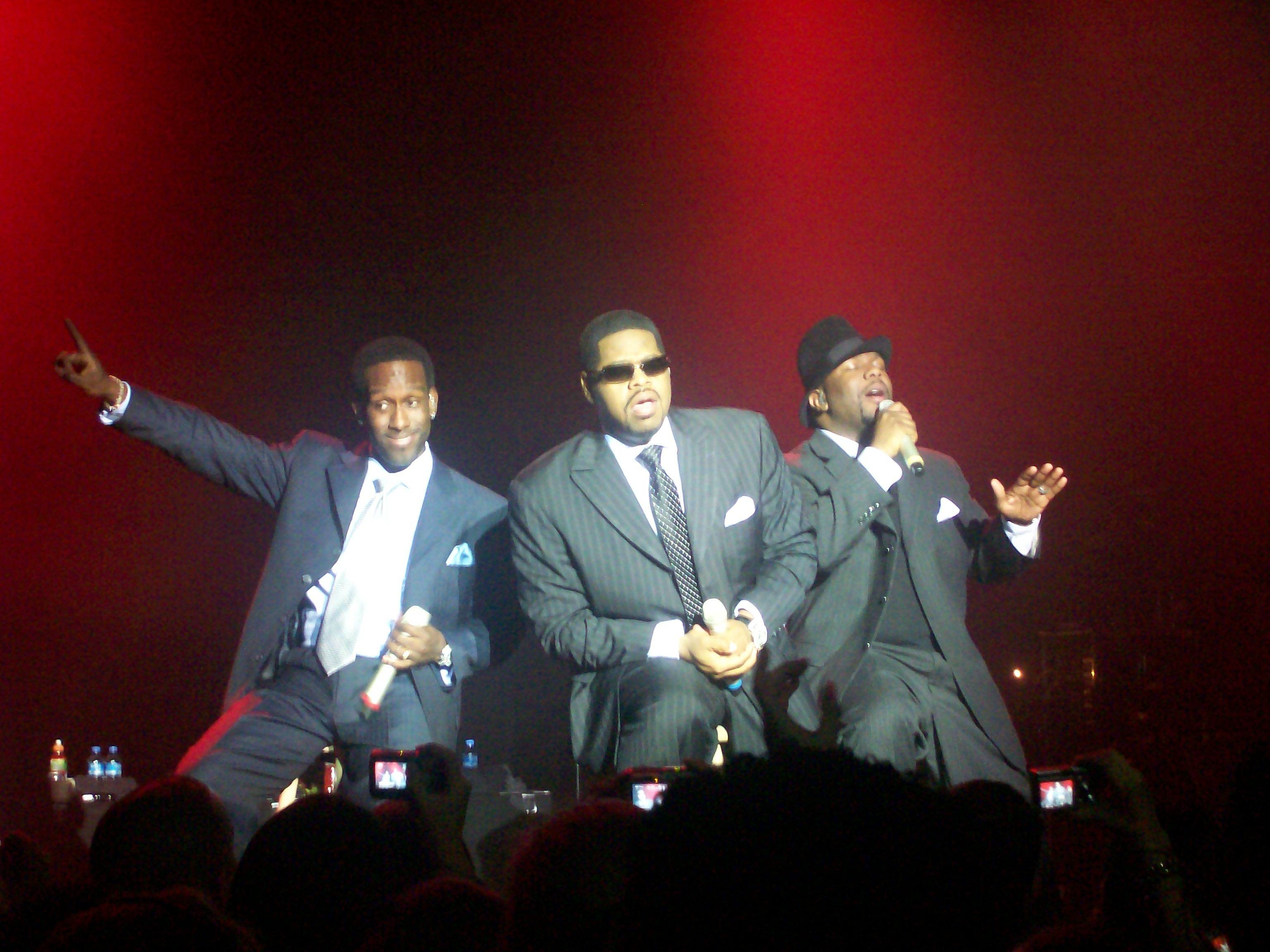
Boyz II Men (pictured) earned a Hot 100 number-one single with "I'll Make Love to You", which stayed at the top position for fourteen straight weeks.

This is a list of the American Billboard magazine Hot 100 number-ones of 1994. There were 10 singles that topped the chart this year. The first of these, "Hero" by Mariah Carey, spent three weeks at the top, concluding a four-week run that had begun in December 1993. The longest running number-one single of 1994 is "I'll Make Love to You" by Boyz II Men, which logged 14 weeks at number-one, tying the song with "I Will Always Love You" by Whitney Houston for the most weeks at number-one on the Billboard Hot 100 until "One Sweet Day" by Mariah Carey and Boyz II Men stayed atop the chart from December 1995 to the first quarter of 1996.

With the rise of "On Bended Knee" to the top of the Hot 100, Boyz II Men became the first act to chart consecutive number-one singles in the United States since The Beatles charted three consecutive number-one singles in 1964.

Furthermore, Lisa Loeb became the first artist to reach #1 with "Stay (I Missed You)" before signing to any record label.

That year, 7 acts earned their first number one song: Celine Dion, Ace of Base, R. Kelly, All-4-One, Lisa Loeb & Nine Stories, and Ini Kamoze. Sting, already having hit number one with The Police, earned his first number one song as a solo act. Boyz II Men was the only act to hit number one more than once, by hitting twice.

== Chart history ==
Key
The yellow background indicates the #1 song on Billboard's 1994 Year-End Chart of Pop Singles.

No.	Issue date	Song	Artist(s)	Ref.
784	January 1	"Hero"	Mariah Carey	
784	January 8	"Hero"	Mariah Carey	
784	January 15	"Hero"	Mariah Carey	
785	January 22	"All for Love"	Bryan Adams / Rod Stewart / Sting	
785	January 29	"All for Love"	Bryan Adams / Rod Stewart / Sting	
785	February 5	"All for Love"	Bryan Adams / Rod Stewart / Sting	
786	February 12	"The Power of Love"	Céline Dion	
786	February 19	"The Power of Love"	Céline Dion	
786	February 26	"The Power of Love"	Céline Dion	
786	March 5	"The Power of Love"	Céline Dion	
787	March 12	"The Sign"	Ace of Base	
787	March 19	"The Sign"	Ace of Base	
787	March 26	"The Sign"	Ace of Base	
787	April 2	"The Sign"	Ace of Base	
788	April 9	"Bump n' Grind"	R. Kelly	
788	April 16	"Bump n' Grind"	R. Kelly	
788	April 23	"Bump n' Grind"	R. Kelly	
788	April 30	"Bump n' Grind"	R. Kelly	
re	May 7	"The Sign"	Ace of Base	
re	May 14	"The Sign"	Ace of Base	
789	May 21	"I Swear"	All-4-One	
789	May 28	"I Swear"	All-4-One	
789	June 4	"I Swear"	All-4-One	
789	June 11	"I Swear"	All-4-One	
789	June 18	"I Swear"	All-4-One	
789	June 25	"I Swear"	All-4-One	
789	July 2	"I Swear"	All-4-One	
789	July 9	"I Swear"	All-4-One	
789	July 16	"I Swear"	All-4-One	
789	July 23	"I Swear"	All-4-One	
789	July 30	"I Swear"	All-4-One	
790	August 6	"Stay (I Missed You)"	Lisa Loeb & Nine Stories	
790	August 13	"Stay (I Missed You)"	Lisa Loeb & Nine Stories	
790	August 20	"Stay (I Missed You)"	Lisa Loeb & Nine Stories	
791	August 27	"I'll Make Love to You"	Boyz II Men	
791	September 3	"I'll Make Love to You"	Boyz II Men	
791	September 10	"I'll Make Love to You"	Boyz II Men	
791	September 17	"I'll Make Love to You"	Boyz II Men	
791	September 24	"I'll Make Love to You"	Boyz II Men	
791	October 1	"I'll Make Love to You"	Boyz II Men	
791	October 8	"I'll Make Love to You"	Boyz II Men	
791	October 15	"I'll Make Love to You"	Boyz II Men	
791	October 22	"I'll Make Love to You"	Boyz II Men	
791	October 29	"I'll Make Love to You"	Boyz II Men	
791	November 5	"I'll Make Love to You"	Boyz II Men	
791	November 12	"I'll Make Love to You"	Boyz II Men	
791	November 19	"I'll Make Love to You"	Boyz II Men	
791	November 26	"I'll Make Love to You"	Boyz II Men	
792	December 3	"On Bended Knee"	Boyz II Men	
792	December 10	"On Bended Knee"	Boyz II Men	
793	December 17	"Here Comes the Hotstepper"	Ini Kamoze	
793	December 24	"Here Comes the Hotstepper"	Ini Kamoze	
re	December 31	"On Bended Knee"	Boyz II Men	

== Number-one artists ==
List of number-one artists by total weeks at number one
Position	Artist	Weeks at No. 1
1	Boyz II Men	17
2	All-4-One	11
3	Ace of Base	6
4	Céline Dion	4
4	R. Kelly	4
6	Mariah Carey	3
6	Bryan Adams	3
6	Rod Stewart	3
6	Sting	3
6	Lisa Loeb & Nine Stories	3
11	Ini Kamoze	2

== See also ==
- 1994 in music
- List of Billboard number-one singles
- List of Billboard Hot 100 number-one singles of the 1990s

== Additional sources ==
- Fred Bronson's Billboard Book of Number 1 Hits, 5th Edition (ISBN 0-8230-7677-6)
- Joel Whitburn's Top Pop Singles 1955-2008, 12th Edition (ISBN 0-89820-180-2)
- Joel Whitburn Presents the Billboard Hot 100 Charts: The Nineties (ISBN 0-89820-137-3)
- Additional information obtained can be verified within Billboard's online archive services and print editions of the magazine.
