= Just a Groove =

Just a Groove may refer to:

- Just a Groove (Nomad song), 1991
- Just a Groove (Glen Adams Affair song), 1980
