= Land of a Thousand Dances =

1962 single by Chris Kenner

- Side A of the US single

Single by Chris Kenner
- B-side: "That's My Girl"
- Released: October 1962
- Genre: Rhythm and blues
- Label: Instant
- Songwriter: Chris Kenner

Chris Kenner singles chronology
"Let Me Show You How (To Twist)" (1962)	"Land of a Thousand Dances" (1962)	"Come Back and See" (1963)

"Land of 1000 Dances"
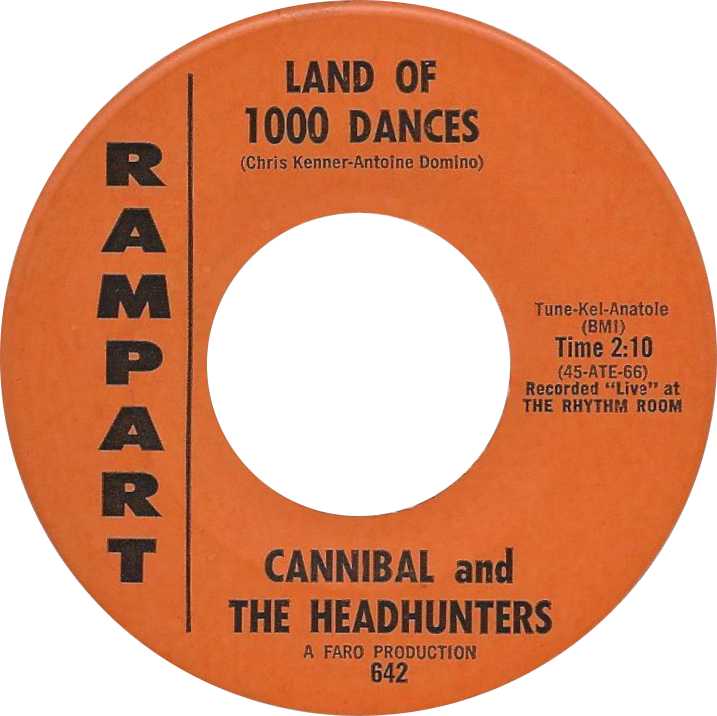
- Side A of US Rampart edition

Single by Cannibal & the Headhunters

from the album Land of 1000 Dances
- B-side: "I'll Show You How to Love Me"
- Released: February 1965
- Genre: Garage rock; proto-punk
- Label: Rampart
- Songwriter: Chris Kenner

Cannibal & the Headhunters singles chronology
"Land of 1000 Dances" (1965)	"Nau Ninny Nau" (1965)

"Land of a Thousand Dances" or "Land of 1000 Dances" is a song written and first recorded by the American rhythm and blues singer Chris Kenner in 1962. It later became a bigger hit with versions by Cannibal & the Headhunters and Wilson Pickett. A version by Thee Midniters reached number 27 in Canada on March 22, 1965.

The song references a number of dance styles including the Twist, the Alligator, the Mashed Potato, the Watusi and the Pony.

== Background ==
The original Chris Kenner recording, which peaked at No. 77 on the Billboard chart in 1963, mentions 16 dances: the Pony, the Chicken, the Mashed Potato, the Alligator, the Watusi, the Twist, the Fly, the Jerk, the Tango, the Yo-Yo, the Sweet Pea, the Hand Jive, the Slop, the Bop, the Fish, and the Popeye. Kenner's original recording included a brief, gospel-influenced, a capella introduction with the words: "Children, go where I send you / (Where will you send me?) / I'm gon' send you to that land / the land of a thousand dances." This 18 seconds was left off the single release to facilitate radio airplay, and the phrase "Land of 1000 Dances" never appeared in any subsequent recording.

== Cannibal and the Headhunters version ==
The song's "na na na na na" hook was added by Cannibal & the Headhunters in their 1965 version, which reached number 30 on the Billboard chart. The hook happened by accident when Frankie "Cannibal" Garcia, lead singer of Cannibal and the Headhunters, forgot the lyrics. The melody to this section was also created spontaneously, as it is not in Chris Kenner's original track. The hook was later borrowed in the 1994 song "Here Comes the Hotstepper" by Jamaican artist Ini Kamoze.

== Wilson Pickett version ==
"Land of 1000 Dances"
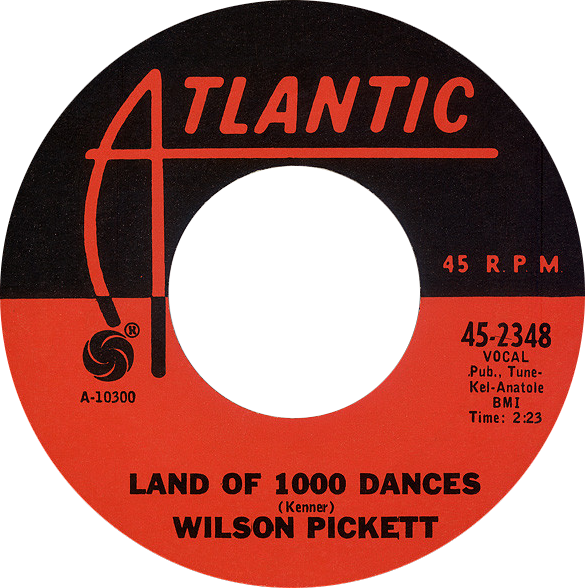
- Side A of US (Atlantic) edition

Single by Wilson Pickett

from the album The Exciting Wilson Pickett
- B-side: "You're So Fine"
- Released: July 1966
- Recorded: May 11, 1966
- Studio: FAME, Muscle Shoals, Alabama
- Genre: Rhythm and blues
- Length: 2:28
- Label: Atlantic
- Songwriter: Chris Kenner

Wilson Pickett singles chronology
"Ninety Nine and a Half (Won't Do)" (1966)	"Land of 1000 Dances" (1966)	"Mustang Sally" (1966)

The song's best-known version was by Wilson Pickett, who recorded the song during his first set of sessions at FAME Studios in Muscle Shoals, Alabama, backed by the Muscle Shoals Rhythm Section and the Memphis Horns. (He had previously recorded in Memphis.) His recording was released as a single and appeared on his album, The Exciting Wilson Pickett. The single became his third Hot R&B/Hip-Hop Songs No. 1 hit and his biggest ever pop hit, peaking at No. 6. In 1988 a re-recorded version by Pickett was featured in a concert during the film The Great Outdoors, while the original recording is featured at the end credits of the movie. In 1989, the earlier Pickett version was ranked number 152 on Dave Marsh's list of The 1001 Greatest Singles Ever Made. The version was later used in the 1997 film The Full Monty. Pickett's version also appears in a trailer for the 2006 film Glory Road, a 2017 TV commercial for Hulu and a 2022 commercial for the Samsung Galaxy.

The song appeared in Just Dance 3 as a playable track.

=== Personnel ===
- Vocals: Wilson Pickett
- Guitar: Chips Moman, Jimmy Johnson
- Keyboards: Spooner Oldham
- Drums: Roger Hawkins
- Bass: Junior Lowe or Tommy Cogbill
- Tenor sax: Charlie Chalmers, Andrew Love
- Trumpet: Wayne Jackson
- Baritone Sax: Floyd Newman

== Other recordings and inspirations ==
- Some releases of the song credit Antoine "Fats" Domino as a co-author of the song with Kenner. Domino agreed to record the song in exchange for half of the song's royalties.
- The J. Geils Band released a live cover version as a single in 1983. Cash Box said that the band "does justice" to the original on the recording. Billboard said that "Acapella chanting, with the audience hooting and clapping in the background, fills out the sound with manic high energy."
- The "na na na" chorus was interpolated into the reggae hit "Here Comes the Hotstepper" by Ini Kamoze, which topped the US charts in 1994.

== Charts ==
=== Weekly charts ===
Chris Kenner version

Chart (1963)	Peak position
US Billboard Hot 100	77

Cannibal and the Headhunters version

Chart (1965)	Peak position
Canada Top Singles (RPM)	42
US Billboard Hot 100	30

Wilson Pickett version

Chart (1966)	Peak position
Canada Top Singles (RPM)	6
UK Singles (OCC)	22
U.S. Billboard Hot 100	6
U.S. Billboard Hot Rhythm & Blues Singles	1

Ted Nugent version

Chart (1981)	Peak position
U.S. Billboard Hot Mainstream Rock Tracks	47

J. Geils Band version

Chart (1982)	Peak position
US Billboard Hot 100	60

Elwood Blues Revue featuring Wilson Pickett version

Chart (1988)	Peak position
Italy Airplay (Music & Media)	2

== Certifications ==
=== Wilson Pickett version ===
Region	Certification	Certified units/sales
New Zealand (RMNZ)	Gold	15,000^{‡}
United Kingdom (BPI) Sales since 2004	Silver	200,000^{‡}
^{‡} Sales+streaming figures based on certification alone.
