= Love on the Line (Lydia Murdock song) =

Song by Lydia Murdock

from the album Superstar
- A-side: "Love on the Line"
- B-side: "Love on the Line (Instrumental version)"
- Released: 1984
- Label: WEA YZ17 (UK 7")
- Songwriter: Michael Burton
- Producers: Gerry Gabinelli & Michael Burton; Additional Productions - Tony Bongiovi & Bobby Eli

UK chronology
"Superstar" (1983)	"Love on the Line" (1984)

"Love on the Line" was a 1984 single for pop singer Lydia Murdock. It was chart hit for her on the UK disco charts. It was also a radio hit in Montreal, Canada.

== Background ==
"Love on the Line" is a telephone song". It is a plea from a woman to the operator to put her though to her man. She has been unsuccessful in her attempt to reach him on the phone as it is busy. She says that this is an emergency and asks the operator to check the line. She also wonders who her man is talking to.

Lydia Murdock recorded the single "Love on the Line" which was released in 12" format in the US on Team TRS3006. It was written by Michael Burton and produced by Burton, Gerry Gabinelli, Bobby Eli, and Tony Bongiovi. It was released in the UK on WEA YZ17T.

== Reception ==
It was noted in the 30 July issue of Euro Tip Sheet that a German correspondent had reported Lydia Murdock's single "Love on the Line" had been released on 28 July.

The song was reviewed by James Hamilton on the week of 25 August 1984. He confirmed that it was selling well in the UK. However, Hamilton said her lamenting about her man's phone line being busy was a bit nagging. It was also reviewed that same week by Jerry Smith in Music Week. He said that it was a strong dance single and noted the catchy vocal harmonies and sweeping strings. And even though he said that it was another song about telephones, he said that the chorus was memorable, and it should do well. And on that same week, Murdock's song lyrics for "Love on the Line" and her photo was featured in the 25 August 1984 issue of Number One magazine.

It was mentioned in the "Another Next News Corner" section in the 3 September issue of Euro Tip Sheet that Lydia Murdock had released her new single "Love on the Line".

"Love on the Line" was a recommended single in the 13 October issue of Billboard.

== Airplay ==
For the week of 18 August, "Love on the Line" was the highest record in the Music Week Airplay Action Bubbling chart. It was also a climber on the Radio London play list.

For the week of 8 September, Music Week reported that "Love on the Line" had dropped down from sixteen playlists to fifteen. It was on the B list of seven radio stations in the South West, East and Midlands areas. It was also on the A list of one Midlands station. Radio Viking in the North had it as a hit pick. It was on the B list of two stations in the North, the A list of one station in Scotland, the B list of one station in Wales, and the A list of one station in Northern Ireland.

According to the 10 September issue of Euro Tip Sheet, "Love on the Line" was one of the three records of the week on Radio WDR in Koln, Germany.

In Montreal, Canada, "Love on the Line" debuted at no. 40 on the Radio CKGM 98 chart on the week of 1 February, 1985. On the week of 12 February, it was at no. 33. It was still in the chart at 32 on the following week.

According to the 2 March 1985 issue of RPM Weekly, "Love on the Line" was at 32-33 on CKGM. The following week it wasn't on the play list.

== Chart performance ==
For the week of 25 August, the single debuted on the Record Mirror UK Disco Top 85 chart at number 55. The following week it had dropped down to no. 72.

It was reported by Music Week in the magazine's 8 September issue that "Love on the Line" had debuted at no. 49 on the Music Week Top Disco & Dance Singles chart. The following week, it peaked at no. 48.

=== Chart summary ===
Chart summary
Country	Year	Publication	Chart name	Peak	Notes
UK	1983	Record Mirror	UK Disco Top 85	55	
UK	1983	Music Week	Top Disco & Dance	48	
Canada	1984	CKGM-98			On 22 Feb 1984 the record was at 32.
