= No Stoppin' That Rockin' =

Single by Instant Funk
- Released: 1982
- Length: 6:18 (12" Version)
- Label: Salsoul SG-385 (US)
- Songwriter: Dennis Richardson
- Producer: Bunny Sigler

No Stoppin' That Rockin' is a 1982 single recorded by Instant Funk for Salsoul Records. It was produced by Bunny Sigler and written by Dennis Richardson.

Side A was remixed by Salsoul-era remixer Tom Moulton. Side B was remixed by Sergio Munzabai of Morales and Munzibai duo.

== Reception ==
The single peaked at number 32 on the Billboard Black Singles chart in 1982. It was even included in the "recommended" section of the Billboard Top Single Picks in the same year.

== Track listing ==
=== 1982 release ===
12" vinyl

- US: Salsoul / SG 385
- US: Salsoul / SG 385 DJ

Side one
| No. | Title | Length |
|---|---|---|
| 1. | "No Stoppin' That Rockin'" | 6:18 |

Side two
| No. | Title | Length |
|---|---|---|
| 1. | "No Stoppin' That Rockin'" | 6:50 |
| 2. | "No Stoppin' That Rockin'" (Dub Version) | 5:55 |
| 3. | "No Stoppin' That Rockin'" (Acapella) | 1:25 |

== Personnel ==
- Arrangement, composer: Dennis Richardson
- Mastering: Herbie Jr
- Remix: Sergio Munzibai (2–4), Tom Moulton (1)
- Produced for Bundino Productions.

== Chart performance ==
| Chart (1985) | Peak position |
|---|---|
| US Billboard Black Singles | 32 |
