= Saturday Night (Glen Adams Affair song) =

Song by Glen Adams Affair featuring T-Ski Valley
- A-side: "Saturday Night (Carribean Style)"
- B-side: "Saturday Night (Carribean Style) (Skank Mix)"
- Released: 1984
- Length: 7:42
- Label: Nunk Records 1008
- Composer: Glen P. Adams
- Producer: Glen P. Adams

"Saturday Night" was a 1984 single for the Glen Adams Affair featuring T-Ski Valley. It was a chart hit in England, spending four weeks on the Disco 85 chart.

== Background ==
The single "Saturday Night" which was credited to Glen Adams Affair featuring T. Ski Valley was released on Nunk 1008. The credited composer and producer for the song is Glen P. Adams. In the US it was released in a 7" format on Capo CAPO TG001.

== Reception ==
It was reviewed by James Hamilton on the week of 24 November 1984. Hamilton said, "Still good enough fun to cross over here".

== Charts ==
For the week of 10 November "Saturday Night" debuted on the Record Mirror Disco chart at no. 79. It peaked at no. 63 on 24 November during its four week run.
