= Lyrical Gangsta =

Studio album by Ini Kamoze
- Released: 1995
- Genre: Dancehall
- Label: East West
- Producer: Philip Burrell

Ini Kamoze chronology
Here Comes the Hotstepper (1995)	Lyrical Gangsta (1995)	Debut (2006)

Lyrical Gangsta is an album by the Jamaican musician Ini Kamoze, released in 1995. "Listen Me Tic" was the first single.

The album peaked at No. 6 on Billboard's Reggae Albums chart. A compilation album, Here Comes the Hotstepper, was released right before Lyrical Gangsta, to the consternation of Kamoze and his label.

== Production ==
The album was produced by Philip Burrell. It was influenced by American hip hop, although Kamoze continued to release purely dancehall singles in Jamaica during the same time. Guru guested on "Who Goes There"; Nine also appears on Lyrical Gangsta.

== Critical reception ==
Professional ratings
Review scores
Source	Rating
AllMusic	3/5 stars
The Atlanta Journal-Constitution	2/4 stars
The Encyclopedia of Popular Music	3/5 stars
Entertainment Weekly	B+
MusicHound World: The Essential Album Guide	2/5 stars
The Republican	1.5/5 stars
The Tampa Tribune	3.5/4 stars

The Toronto Sun dismissed the album as "a blatantly commercial brand of dancehall." The Atlanta Journal-Constitution determined that "the second half of the album is a lesson in dance-hall crooning... The Hotstepper wafts his mellifluous tenor over hip swaying reggae beats sounding more natural and carrying more of an impact."

Entertainment Weekly wrote that, "with his sweet, singsong tenor offsetting abrasive dancehall reggae backbeats, Ini Kamoze manages to straddle two worlds." The Toronto Star considered the album "more American hip-hop than Jamaican reggae." The Tampa Tribune concluded that "the beauty of his run-of-the-mill vocals is that he doesn't compete with the music, a product of great studio work."

AllMusic wrote that the "duet performance with Guru (of Gang Starr fame) is a great juxtaposition of two very different rapping styles, and 'King Selassie' is a surprisingly sincere and sweetly melodic example of rootswise dancehall."

== Track listing ==
No.	Title	Length
1.	"Trust Me"	0:33
2.	"Hole in Ya Head" (featuring Nine)	4:06
3.	"Listen Me Tic"	3:51
4.	"Don't Burn Ya Bridge"	3:59
5.	"He Jus Jokin"	0:39
6.	"Love Em Doe?"	4:28
7.	"Who Goes There" (featuring Guru)	3:30
8.	"Ballistic Affair"	4:19
9.	"How U Livin"	4:03
10.	"King Selassie"	4:14
11.	"Hot Steppa"	3:59
12.	"Imagine ... In Dub"	4:30
13.	"Turn Me On"	3:14
14.	"Kildatsounboy"	3:40
15.	"Hotter This Year" (Hot Steppa Remix)	4:54
