= Instant Funk =

American disco band

- Origin: Trenton, New Jersey
- Genres: Soul, disco, funk, post-disco, electro
- Years active: 1975–1985
- Labels: Philadelphia International; Salsoul Records
- Past members: Raymond Earl; Scotty Miller; Kim Miller

Instant Funk was an American 1970s and 1980s funk and disco band, best known for their disco classic, "I Got My Mind Made Up (You Can Get It Girl)".

== History ==
Instant Funk came out of Trenton, New Jersey consisting of Raymond Earl, drummer Scotty Miller and guitarist Kim Miller. The group was then called The Music Machine and they were very successful as a back-up band for The Manhattans, Bunny Sigler and also the TNJs. Throughout their careers, Instant Funk would be the back-up band for many stars, including Lou Rawls, Loleatta Holloway, The O'Jays, MFSB, Curtis Mayfield and Evelyn Champagne King (they are the backing band on the hit single, "Shame").

The group relocated to Philadelphia in 1976 to release its first album, Get Down With the Philly Jump, as they started to formulate their own sound. The group followed this album up with a release for former MFSB guitarist Norman Harris' new record label Gold Mind, with front man Bunny Sigler entitled "Let Me Party With You".

Instant Funk's next cut "I Got My Mind Made Up" was transferred to the Salsoul label, which pushed the record heavily to all of the disco clubs. The remix of this song by club DJ Larry Levan and engineer Bob Blank quickly became the talk of Manhattan. "I Got My Mind Made Up" hit No. 1 on both the R&B and disco charts and No. 20 on the Billboard Hot 100 chart in the spring of 1979. The group's eponymous first album on Salsoul was also a hit, reaching No. 1 R&B and being certified gold disc status.

Scotty Miller (born Steven Scott Miller on August 22, 1951 in Trenton, New Jersey) died on April 11, 2017, at the age of 65.

== Discography ==
=== Studio albums ===
| Year | Title | Peak chart positions | | | Certifications | Record label |
| Year | Title | US | US R&B | CAN | Certifications | Record label |
|---|---|---|---|---|---|---|
| 1976 | Get Down with the Philly Jump | — | — | — | | TSOP |
| 1979 | Instant Funk | 12 | 1 | 14 | US: Gold | Salsoul |
| 1979 | Witch Doctor | 129 | 23 | — | | Salsoul |
| 1980 | The Funk Is On | 130 | 62 | — | | Salsoul |
| 1982 | Looks So Fine | 147 | 43 | — | | Salsoul |
| 1983 | Instant Funk V | — | 38 | — | | Salsoul |
| 1983 | Kinky | — | — | — | | Salsoul |
"—" denotes a recording that did not chart or was not released in that territory.

=== Compilation albums ===
- Greatest Hits (1996, The Right Stuff/Salsoul)
- The Best of Instant Funk (1997, Charly UK)
- The Anthology (2006, Salsoul)
- I Got My Mind Made Up: The Best of Instant Funk (2006, Koch Records)
- Greatest Hits (2008, JDC)

=== Singles ===
| Year | Title | Peak chart positions | | | | | | |
| Year | Title | US | US R&B | US Dan | BEL | CAN | NLD | UK |
|---|---|---|---|---|---|---|---|---|
| 1975 | "Float Like a Butterfly, Part I" | — | — | — | — | — | — | — |
| 1976 | "Philly Jump" | — | — | — | — | — | — | — |
| 1976 | "It Ain't Reggae (But It's Funky)" | — | — | 24 | — | — | — | — |
| 1978 | "I Got My Mind Made Up (You Can Get It Girl)" | 20 | 1 | 1 | 16 | 13 | 20 | 46 |
| 1979 | "Crying" | — | 41 | — | — | — | — | — |
| 1979 | "Witch Doctor" | — | 35 | — | — | — | — | — |
| 1980 | "Bodyshine" | 103 | 41 | 28 | — | — | — | — |
| 1980 | "Slap, Slap, Lickedy Lap" | — | — | 28 | — | — | — | — |
| 1980 | "The Funk Is On" | — | 87 | 22 | — | — | — | — |
| 1980 | "Everybody" | — | — | 22 | — | — | — | — |
| 1982 | "Why Don't You Think About Me" | — | 59 | — | — | — | — | — |
| 1983 | "No Stoppin' That Rockin'" | — | 32 | — | — | — | — | — |
| 1983 | "Who Took Away the Funk" | — | 70 | — | — | — | — | — |
| 1983 | "(Just Because) You'll Be Mine" | — | 71 | 21 | — | — | — | — |
| 1985 | Tailspin" (featuring Yves Sterling) | — | — | — | — | — | — | — |
"—" denotes a recording that did not chart or was not released in that territory.

== See also ==
- List of number-one dance hits (United States)
- List of artists who reached number one on the US Dance chart
