= Here Comes the Hotstepper (album) =

Studio album by Ini Kamoze
- Released: 17 January 1995
- Recorded: 1993–1994
- Genre: Reggae; dancehall; reggae fusion
- Label: Columbia; Sony
- Producer: Sly Dunbar, Robbie Shakespeare

Ini Kamoze chronology
16 Vibes of Ini Kamoze (1992)	Here Comes the Hotstepper (1995)	Lyrical Gangsta (1995)

Singles from Here Comes the Hotstepper
- 1. "Here Comes the Hotstepper" Released: 18 August 1994

Professional ratings
Review scores
Source	Rating
AllMusic	4.5/5 stars
Robert Christgau	2/3 stars
NME	8/10

Here Comes the Hotstepper is a 1995 album by Jamaican reggae and dancehall artist Ini Kamoze. It was produced by Sly Dunbar and Robbie Shakespeare. It contains as title track the international hit "Here Comes the Hotstepper" that charted in the United States, UK and many European charts. The remainder of the album's tracks are re-recordings of songs that had appeared on Kamoze's first four albums: Ini Kamoze (1984), Statement (also 1984), and Pirate (1986).

== Track listing ==
1. "Call the Police" – 5:37
2. "Rough" – 3:28
3. "Here Comes the Hotstepper" (Heartical Mix) – 4:11
4. "Gunshot" – 4:57
5. "World-A-Music" – 3:46
6. "Trouble You a Trouble Me" – 3:58
7. "General" – 4:03
8. "Pull Up the Cork" – 5:50
9. "Pirate" – 3:43
10. "Babylon, Babylon" – 4:54
11. "I Want Ital" – 4:47
12. "Burnin'" – 4:51

== Personnel ==
- Robbie Shakespeare – bass, guitar
- Sly Dunbar – drums
- Willie Lindo – guitar
- Dean Frazer – horns
- Richard Dunn – keyboards
- Robbie Lyn – piano, synthesizer
- Sly Dunbar & Robbie Shakespeare – producers

== Charts ==
Chart performance for Here Comes the Hotstepper
Chart (1995)	Peak position
German Albums (Offizielle Top 100)	71
