= Catch the Beat (Scratch the Beat) =

Song by T-Ski Valley
- Label: Master Mix 12CHE 8409
- Composer(s): T. Cox / G. Osbourne
- Producer(s): Glen Adams & Judy Mason

"Catch the Beat (Scratch the Beat)" was a 1984 single for T-Ski Valley. It became a hit for him that year on the UK Disco Top 85 chart. It stayed in the chart more than two months during its run.

== Background ==
"Catch the Beat (Scratch the Beat)" was released on Master Mix 12CHE 8409 in 1984. It was also released on BMC 3597.

== Reception ==
The single was reviewed by James Hamilton which was published on 24 November 1984. Referring to T-Ski Valley as an infectiously friendly rapper, he mentioned the bpm's at 106-108-109-106½ and how the song was "right in today’s groove". He also said that there was enough fun with it to cross over into the UK.

== Charts ==
For the week of 30 June 1984 "Catch the Beat (Scratch the Beat)" debuted on the Record Mirror Disco 85 chart at no. 45. For the week of 28 July, it moved up from no. 40 to its peak position at no. 33 on the chart during its ten week run.

On 22 September, "Catch the Beat (Scratch the Beat)" re-emerged on the Disco Top 85 chart at no. 75. It stayed in the chart for one more week.
