= Susan Cadogan =

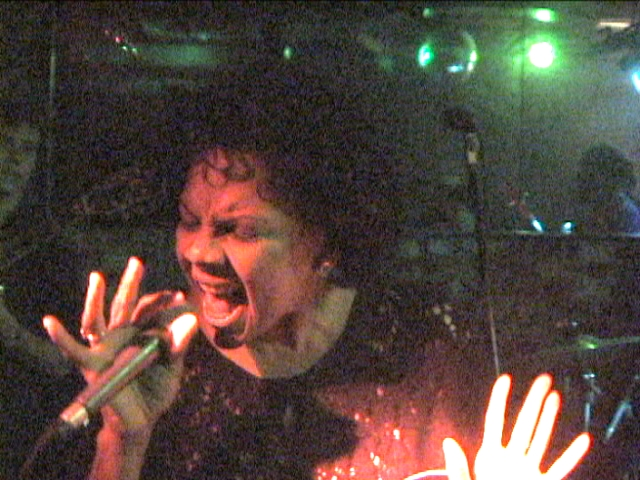
- Cadogan in 2004

Background information
- Born: Alison Anne Cadogan; 2 November 1951 (age 74)
- Origin: Kingston, Jamaica
- Genre: Reggae
- Years active: 1970–present
- Labels: Trojan Records, Magnet Records, Capo Records

Susan Cadogan (born Allison Anne Cadogan; 2 November 1951) is a Jamaican reggae singer best known for her hit records in the mid 1970s.

== Biography ==
Cadogan is the daughter of Rev. Claude Cadogan and Lola Cadogan, a trained soprano singer of classical and devotional music during the 1950s up until 2000. Cadogan spent several years of her childhood in Belize, where her father was from, before returning to Jamaica to live. She worked as an assistant librarian, taking a job in the library of the University of the West Indies at Mona. Her talents as a singer led to her recording her first single, "Love My Life" for Jamaican Broadcasting Corporation (JBC radio) DJ Jerry Lewis, who was the boyfriend of one of Cadogan's school friends. Lee "Scratch" Perry was in the recording studio at the time, and was impressed by Cadogan's voice enough to record an album's worth of material with her, also renaming her Susan.

One of her first recordings for Perry, a cover of Millie Jackson's soul hit, "Hurt So Good" (featuring bassist Boris Gardiner and the Zap Pow horns), was released to little effect in Jamaica on Perry's new Perries record label, but was released in the UK by Dennis Harris' DIP International label, and topped the UK reggae chart. Magnet Records picked up the single after it was brought to the label by A&R man Pete Waterman, and it went on to reach No. 4 in the UK Singles Chart, with Cadogan flying to London to promote the single, including many television appearances on the BBC's Top of the Pops. Legal issues ensued after Magnet had released the single with it reaching the UK top 10 and a court case determined that Trojan Records had the UK rights to the single. Cadogan then signed directly to Magnet, for whom she recorded a new version of the song. Magnet also issued the official follow-up, the Waterman-produced "Love Me Baby", which reached number 22 in July 1975, but was her last UK hit. Perry, meanwhile, arranged with the Birmingham-based label Black Wax to release an unofficial follow-up – a remixed version of "Love My Life". Other singles ("Nice & easy", "Fever", "In the Ghetto") were released on Klik and Lucky in an attempt to cash in, but none of these charted. "Hurt So Good" was subsequently certified silver in the United Kingdom and gold in South Africa after a few weeks and became one of the top selling singles of 1975 in the UK.

Two mid 1970s albums, the Waterman-produced Doing It Her Way and Susan Cadogan (compiled from Perry's productions) were released by Magnet and Trojan Records respectively.

Cadogan returned to her library job, but resurfaced as a recording artist in 1981, having a string of hits in Jamaica including covers of "Tracks of my Tears" and "Piece of My Heart" and in 1982 a cover of "You Know How to Make me Feel so Good" with Ruddy Thomas that topped the UK Black chart for eight weeks. Although Cadogan returned to her library job she continued to record. The self produced album Chemistry of Love was released in 1989 followed by Ariwa Records (produced by the Mad Professor) album Soulful Reggae in 1992. In 1998 the album Stealing Love with Ruddy Thomas was released by Creole Records. This was followed by two more albums, The Rhythm in You and Sincerely Susan, co-produced by Cadogan and Glen Adams (Capo Records) in Brooklyn, New York in 2003. Cadogan then recorded again for Ariwa Records and the album 2 Sides of Susan was produced by Mad Professor was double-released in Japan and the UK.

Cadogan rarely performs in her homeland of Jamaica but once made an appearance on the Heineken Startime Series event in Kingston. She has toured together with Glen Adams and The Slackers as well as with the Portuguese band The Ratazanas, and with the Debonaires (of California), the Magic Touch (Germany) and more recently with The Magnetics (Italy).

In 2016, she released a five-song EP, Take Me Back, produced by the Canadian Mitch Girio, followed by the complete album The Girl Who Cried and in 2017 released a reggae version of "Love Story", a duet with Jamaican veteran Ken Boothe.

Cadogan continues to appear regularly in the UK, at festivals and other events.

== Album discography ==
- Doing It Her Way (1975) Magnet
- Susan Cadogan aka Hurt So Good (1976) Trojan
- Chemistry of Love (1989) Imp
- Soulful Reggae (1992) Ariwa
- Stealing Love (1998) Rhino
- The Rhythm in You (2003) Capo
- Sincerely... Susan (2004) Capo
- Two Sides of Susan (2008) JVC Japan
- Take Me Back (2017) Jump Up!
- The Girl Who Cried (2018) Burning Sounds
- Hurt So Good - Storybook Revisited (2020) Burning Sounds
- The Girl Who Cried + Chemistry of Love (2021) Burning Sounds
