= Alfie Silas =

- Born: Alphanette Silas Durio
- Origin: United States
- Genres: R&B, pop, various
- Occupation: Singer
- Instrument: Voice
- Labels: RCA Victor, Motown

Alfie Silas is an American singer who has had a long career as a session singer. She has also had success as a solo artist and has had five hits on the r&b charts during the 1980s.

== Background ==
Alfie Silas has been described by Cash Box as having a vocal range similar to Jennifer Holliday. She has been a backing vocalist for Martha Reeves and Gino Vanelli.

Between 1982 and 1986 she had chart hits with "A Puppet to You", "There I Go", "Be Yourself", Star" and "Just Gets Better with "Time".

== Career ==
Alfie Silas's new single "There I Go" was in the New & Active category in the 26 November 1982 issue of Radio & Records. It was getting heavy rotation at stations, WHRK, WJMO, and WZEN-FM. She was also on a regional promotional tour and did an on-air interview at New York radio station WLIB with WIBL's Pablo Guzman.

"There I Go" was one of the Feature Picks in the 1 January 1983 issue of Cash Box. Referred to as a newcomer, the reviewer said that she shined like a torch balladeer on the A/C slanted single and that she demonstrated her abilities. The reviewer also said that she was a professional of the highest order. At the time, "There I Go" had been in the Cash Box Top 100 Black Contemporary Singles chart for eight weeks and had moved up four places from no. 47 to no. 43.

A short review was given on her new single, "You Put the L in Love" in the 24 September 1983 issue of Cash Box. The single which was produced by Larry Graham was released on RCA JK-13604. It was referred to as a decidedly funky offering. Its urban contemporary appeal potential was also mentioned.

Alfie Silas's 1983 single won her an award. She came third in the Cash Box 1983 Black Contemporary Singles Awards New Female section with Diane Richards, Madonna, Lydia Murdock and Pamela Nivens at 1, 2, 4 and 5 respectively.

Readers of Cash Box, in the January 28, 1984, issues were told to Watch out for Alfie Silas's new single, "Be Yourself" and that it would make a positive and lasting impression on many listeners.

In 1985 her third album That Look was released on the Motown label. It included the song, "Just Gets Better with Time". Five of the ten songs were co-written by her. Her single "Just Gets Better with Time" was released and it made it to no. 71 on the r&b chart in 1986.

Silas and Larry Hancock recorded the song, "Time Out for Love" which was credited to Larry Hancock with Alphie. It was released on Dessca Records CA 172 in August 1988.
