= T-Ski Valley =

- Born: Tyrone Cox
- Occupations: Rapper, producer
- Instruments: Guitar, voice
- Labels: Capo Records, Grand Groove Records, Dancefloor

T-Ski Valley is an American rapper who had several hits during the 1980s. His song "Catch the Beat" was an early rap favorite in the US in 1981. He had a hit in the UK in 1983 with "Valley Style" which spent six weeks in the UK disco chart, and another hit the following year with "Catch the Beat (Scratch the Beat)" which spent more than two months on the UK disco chart.

== Background ==
T-Ski Valley is a rapper from the Bronx. His song "Catch the Beat", like Kurtis Blow's "The Breaks" is an early rap favorite. It has been described as a huge hit in the black community. The song was referred to as a groundbreaking rap song by Stuart Baker in Hot Stuff magazine issue #11.

T-Ski Valley was born Tyrone Cox. He started his music career at the age of fourteen. He joined Kool Herc in 1978 as an M.C. He also joined up with A.J. & Busy Bee as a D.J. He later became a producer. Two of the acts he produced were Just Four and Chapter III.

== Career ==
=== 1970s to 1990s ===
Along with Brad Osborne of Clocktower Records, Glen Adams and Sir Coxsone Dodd, T-Ski Valley had a part in the creation of the Grand Groove Records label. The association started when T-Ski Valley, known as Tyrone in the early days was hired to set up the break beat section at the back of the store. Tyrone asked if he could also record some hip-hop songs. Osborne booked him some time with Blank Tape Studios which was run by Bob Blank. This is the studio where some early rap and disco artists made their recordings. This included Musique and the Salsoul Orchestra. The single that emerged from the recording session was "Catch the Beat" by T-Ski Valley and Brad Osborne. Osborne and Tyrone, now known as T-Ski Valley produced a total of eight singles for the Grand Groove label over two years.

==== "Catch the Beat" ====
T-Ski Valley recorded "Catch the Beat!" which was released in the US on Grand Groove GG 7701. It was produced by Brad Osborne. "Catch the Beat" was in the East Coast Dance Music Top Ten for the week of 1 August 1981. The song would become an underground hit.

It was reported by Record World in the 12 December 1981 issue that the New York area hit "Catch the Beat" was continuing to sell well.

==== Valley Style ====
T-Ski Valley's "Valley Style" was reviewed in the 30 July 1983 issue of Record Mirror. It was directly below the review of Lydia Murdock's song "Superstar". The reviewer referred to both recordings as answers to Michael Jackson's song "Billie Jean" with the exception of Valley's version being the rap one. It was referred to as a great out of club house.

It was reported by Record Mirror in the 6 August issue that "Valley Style" was a breaker and bubbling under the Disco 85 chart. Barry Lazell commented on the song in the 13 August issue of Music Week. He said with the record being half rap and half instrumental, DJs could get inventive. He would comment on the song again in a later issue. Also that week, if the magazine was correct in the date, "Valley Style" debuted at no. 64 in the Record Mirror Disco chart. It peaked at no. 38 on 27 August. On the week of September 10, the song had a surge and had moved up from no. 61 to no. 55. The following week it fell back to no. 81 which. This was the last week of charting.

==== "Catch the Beat (Scatch the Beat)" ====
For the week of 30 June 1984 "Catch the Beat (Scratch the Beat)" debuted in the Record Mirror Disco 85 chart at no. 45. For the week of 28 July, "Catch the Beat (Scatch the Beat)" reached its peak at no. 33 on the Record Mirror Disco 85 chart. In the UK it was released on Master Mix 12CHE 8409. It was reviewed by James Hamilton on the week of 24 November. Remixed in Belgium, the record contained the original instrumental mix on the flip side. Hamilton said "Still good enough fun to cross over here".

==== "Saturday Night" ====
Also in 1984, a record "Saturday Night" which was credited to Glen Adams Affair featuring T. Ski Valley was released on Nunk 1008. On the week of 10 November "Saturday Night" debuted on the Record Mirror Disco chart at no. 79. It peaked at no. 63 on 24 November.

==== Further activities ====
It was reported by Euro Tip Sheet in the magazine's 5 November issue that "It's Just a Groove" had been added to the playlist of YLE Radio 1 in Henenski, Finland.
