= Bobby Eli =

American songwriter (1946–2023)

- Born: Eli Tatarsky; March 2, 1946; Philadelphia, Pennsylvania, U.S.
- Died: August 17, 2023 (aged 77) Philadelphia, Pennsylvania, U.S.
- Occupations: Musician; arranger; composer; record producer

Bobby Eli (born Eli Tatarsky; March 2, 1946 – August 17, 2023) was an American musician, arranger, composer and record producer from Philadelphia. He was a founding member and lead guitarist of Philadelphia studio band MFSB.

== Overview ==
Bobby Eli was born in Philadelphia, Pennsylvania on March 2, 1946. A multi-instrumentalist, producer, songwriter and arranger, Eli's contributions can be heard on recordings by many artists, including Teddy Pendergrass, The Jacksons, Chris Brown, David Bowie, Jay-Z, Hall and Oates, Patti LaBelle, Elton John, Phyllis Hyman, B.B. King, Billy Paul, Wilson Pickett, George Clinton, The Spinners, The Temptations, The Stylistics, The Trammps, Curtis Mayfield, The Sapphires and Shaggy. He was a regular session player for Gamble & Huff's Philadelphia International label in the 1970s.

His credits as a songwriter include million-selling singles, "Love Won't Let Me Wait", by Major Harris (#1 R&B, #5 pop, 1975), which he also produced and arranged; "Just Don't Want to Be Lonely" by the Main Ingredient (#8 R&B, #10 pop, 1974); and Blue Magic's "Sideshow" (#1 R&B, #8 pop, 1974), as well as "Three Ring Circus" (#5 R&B, #36 pop, 1974) for the same group. He is credited with the success of Jackie Moore's #1 disco-dance classic, "This Time Baby" and co-wrote the song by Fat Larry's Band, "Zoom", which climbed to #2 in the UK Singles Chart in 1982.

Eli also produced, arranged and performed on hit singles for Harold Melvin & The Blue Notes, William "Poogie" Hart of The Delfonics, The Whispers, Regina Belle, Engelbert Humperdinck, The Dells, Isaac Hayes and Sister Sledge. He produced two albums for Atlantic Starr, and Rose Royce; and also Deniece Williams' Grammy-nominated album, Love Niecy Style in 2007.

== Career ==
In 1980, Eli collaborated with Len Stark of Melron Records to record a tribute to the families of the Iran hostage crisis hostages. They recorded a single "American Message To The Hostages" which was released on Melron 5040 in 1980.

Along with Gerry Gabinelli, and Tony Bongiovi, Eli co-produced Lydia Murdock's recording of the Michael Burton composition, "Love on the Line". It was released in the US in 1984 on Team TRS3006 as a 12" single. It was also released in the UK on released in the UK on WEA YZ17T. It made it to no. 55 on the Record Mirror UK Disco Top 85 chart in late August. It also got to no. 48 on the Music Week Top Disco & Dance Singles chart in mid September.

In 2007, Eli helped to unite three of Philly's most successful lead singers, William Hart of The Delfonics, Ted Mills from Blue Magic, and Russell Thompkins, Jr. of the Stylistics. The project was billed as the "Legendary Tenors of Soul" and featured the three vocalists alternating leads on mostly soul standards. Eli recruited Hall & Oates to join the soul trio for an original track on the CD, All The Way From Philadelphia.

In 2006, Eli opened his own recording facility, "The Grooveyard", in the Philadelphia suburbs. He was producing his two new discoveries, a 16-year-old blue-eyed soul singer from Boston, Massachusetts, Dennis "Youngblood" Taylor and female singer, Debra Michaels.

In September 2008 he jointly co wrote (Dixon/Eli/Green), recorded at "The Grooveyard" studio and released with UK song writer/producer Carl Dixon two songs namely 'Soul Recession' by Philly harmony group Double Exposure and 'There I go falling in love again' by Chiquita Green. Chiquita also co wrote these songs with Eli and Dixon. Eli and some other original Salsoul/Philly/TSOP (The Sound of Philadelphia)/MFSB (Gamble and Huff) session musicians played on this session, including Earl Young, Dennis Harris, T.G. Conway, Jimmie Williams and Rikki Hicks. Jimmie Williams died in October 2016.

In 2016, Eli was inducted into the Musicians Hall of Fame and Museum.

== Other projects ==
Eli launched his own label, Groove City Entertainment.

Recent projects written, produced and arranged by Bobby Eli include recordings with El Debarge, Stevie Wonder and Red Hot Chili Peppers. He was producing the new CD for funkmaster George Clinton. Eli has contributed as a guitarist, arranger, and member of MFSB to the "A Soulful Tale of Two Cities" album project, which joins artists from Motown and Philadelphia International Records.

== Personal life and death ==
Eli met his wife, Vonnie in 1969.

He died in Philadelphia on August 17, 2023 at the age of 77, after having suffered a stroke six years earlier. He was survived by his wife.

== Discography ==
Eli played electric guitar on three tracks on Benny Golson's album, Killer Joe (Columbia, 1977)
