= I Got My Mind Made Up (You Can Get It Girl) =

Single by Instant Funk

from the album Instant Funk
- B-side: "Wide World of Sports"
- Released: December 1978
- Genre: Disco; funk
- Length: 5:17; 3:20 (single version)
- Label: Salsoul
- Producer: Bunny Sigler

Instant Funk singles chronology
"It Ain't Reggae (But It's Funky)" (1977)	"I Got My Mind Made Up (You Can Get It Girl)" (1978)	"Slap, Slap, Lickedy Lap" (1979)

"I Got My Mind Made Up (You Can Get It Girl)" is a single by the funk band Instant Funk, recorded and released in 1978, which was later included in their self-titled sophomore album.

== Song Background ==
The original production of this song was done on 8 tracks and was a simple 3 minute R&B song. It was transferred to 24 track tape at Blank Tapes, NYC and work began on it by the producer Bunny Sigler and engineer Bob Blank. Among other things, Bunny brought in a woman to say 'say what?' throughout the record. Standing behind her, his directions ("scream") were amplified and used as part of the production. Remixing was done manually (no computerization) and was attempted by Walter Gibbons, Ken Cayre (the owner of Salsoul Records) and finally by DJ Larry Levan. Recorded in Blank Tapes's old studio A, on a console that was not automated, the remixes were created with splicing tape, playing a small section of the music and then resetting the console, then recording the next piece. For the groove part that defines the song, 4 bars of groove section were edited in over and over to create the format of the song as it exists today. Bob Blank, the engineer for this production, estimates that it took over 60 hours of mixing time to create the versions that exist today.

In 1985, Salsoul Records removed all the multi-track masters from Blank Tapes (hundreds were stored in air conditioned storage areas in the studio) and destroyed them, except for some that were saved from destruction by John Morales. This master was among them.

== Chart performance ==
The song spent three non-consecutive weeks at number one on the R&B singles chart (interrupted by "He's the Greatest Dancer" by Sister Sledge). It also enjoyed success on the Billboard Hot 100 singles chart, peaking at number twenty. The single also peaked at number one on the disco chart.

== Chart positions ==
Chart (1979)	Peak position
U.S. Billboard Hot 100	20
U.S. Billboard Dance	1
U.S. Billboard Hot Soul Singles	1

Year-end chart (1979)	Rank
US Top Pop Singles (Billboard)	90

== Remixes ==
Throughout the years 'I Got My Mind Made Up' has been remixed:

- In 1988 the track was given a house remix by Ambassadors Of Funk.
- In 1990 the song was remixed by Freshline Allstars and Hithouse.
- In 1995 the song was remixed by Johnny Vicious. In 1997 the song was remixed by Alex Neri. In 1998 the song was remixed by Succi
- In 2003 the song was remixed by Thunderpuss.

== Samples ==
- It was recognizably sampled by De La Soul in their track "A Rollerskating Jam named 'Saturdays'".
