= It's You I Love (So in Love) =

Single by Pamela Nivens
- Released: 1983
- Studio: Soundtech (Phoenix)
- Length: 4:07 (7-inch version); 7:22 (12-inch version)
- Label: Sun Valley
- Songwriters: Chaz Simmons; Steve Godfrey
- Producer: Chaz Simmons

"It's You I Love (So in Love)" was a 1983 single for singer Pamela Nivens. It became a hit for her that year, registering on the Billboard Black Singles and Cash Box Top 100 Black Contemporary Singles charts. It also won an award for the singer.

== Background ==
The single was written by Chaz Simmons and Steve Godfrey. It was recorded at Soundtech Studios on 2750 West Osborn Road Phoenix, AZ 85017. Simmons was also the producer. He also handled the arrangements. It was released on Sun Valley Records SV 88001. The financier for the venture was Tommy Cassella who invested $37,000 in the single.

Singer Pamela Nivens was from Arizona and originally from Kansas. Prior to the single's release she had been singing with local bands in Phoenix. Her single got a lot of help from radio station KUKQ.

Nivens was pictured in the 23 July issue of Billboard celebrating her success with the people that made the single. With her were Soundtech Studio president, Lenora "Sarge" Waldon, Sun Valley Records' VP Bill Simmons, Steve Godfrey the single's co-writer and Chaz Simmons the president of Sun Valley.

The single won Pamela Nivens an award. She came fifth in the Cash Box 1983 Black Contemporary Singles Awards New Female section with Diane Richards, Madonna, Alfie Silas and Lydia Murdock at 1, 2, 3 and 4 respectively.

== Reception ==
The single was a recommended song in the 7 May issue of Billboard.

== Airplay ==
It was reported by Radio & Records in the publication's 24 June issue that the single had been added to the playlist of WDAS in Philadelphia, WDAO in Dayton and WKXI in Jackson.

On the week of 22 July, Radio & Records reported that the single had been added to the playlist of WOIC in Columbia. It was also getting heavy rotation at KUKQ and medium rotation at WOOK, XHRM, WKXI, WAAA, WLTH, and WTLC.

On the week of 5 August, Radio & Records reported that in the Southern regions, the single had been added to the playlist of WLOU in Louisville, WJJS in Lynchburg and WYLD-FM in New Orleans. In the Mid-West, it had been added to the playlist of WWWS in Seginaw. It was also seeing heavy rotation at WTLC and KUKQ. It was also seeing medium rotation at WOOK, WGIV, WVOL, WTOY, WAAA, and WLTH.

== Charts ==
The single debuted at no. 90 in the Cash Box Top 100 Black Contemporary Singles chart for the week of 2 July.

For the week of 6 August, the single was at no. 70 on the Billboard Black Singles chart.

At week seven, the single peaked at no. 55 on the Cash Box Top 100 Black Contemporary Singles chart on the week of 13 August. It spent a total of eight weeks in the chart, exiting at no. 92 the following week.
