= Mr. Brown (song) =

1970 single by The Wailers

"Mr. Brown" is a song by Jamaican group The Wailers. Recorded in 1970 at Randy's recording studio in Kingston, it was produced by Lee Perry and written by regular Upsetter musician Glen Adams. It originally was released as a single in Jamaica and has appeared on various compilations such as Songs of Freedom.

Because it is based on a ghost rumor, the song has lyrics and instrumentals based on a spooky style. The instrumental is called "Dracula". The song has been featured on a few Halloween albums, and has a remix with DJ Spooky.

The song's music sampled Jackie Mittoo's "Peenie Wallie".

It sold 15,000 copies in Jamaica.

== Background ==
The theme of the song relates to a rumor that was spreading through Jamaica that a duppy, or ghost, had been spotted in numerous locations speeding through the land on a three-wheeled coffin, perched upon which were three John crows, or buzzards, one of which could talk and was asking for a Mr. Brown. Glen Adams wrote the lyrics after hearing the story, and after Lee Perry's suggestion, was sung by The Wailers.

== Composition ==
The song is played in the key of C♯ major and is mostly based around the chord progression (I-IV-V-IV) with an A♯ minor bridge. To go with the terror theme, the song has spooky elements such as evil laughter.

The backing track was originally recorded for 1970's "Duppy Conqueror" but rejected. Producer Lee "Scratch" Perry was known for combining old backing tracks with vocals to create "new" songs, hence the similarities between "Duppy" and "Mr. Brown", particularly in the chord progression and harmony vocals.
