= The Hippy Boys =

The Hippy Boys was a Jamaican band formed in 1968 by Lloyd Charmers. The band included guitarist Alva "Reggie" Lewis, organist Glen Adams, and brothers Aston 'Family Man' Barrett on bass guitar and Carlton Barrett on drums.

After the UK Singles Chart success of "Return of Django" in 1969, Lee "Scratch" Perry and the Upsetters were invited on a six-week tour of the UK. However, due to a clashing of schedules, the original Upsetters could not make the trip. The newly formed Hippy Boys became the new Upsetters for the tour, causing the band to be frequently confused with the original Upsetters in the future.

The band also recorded with Max Romeo.

== Albums ==
- Reggae with the Hippy Boys
