= Cannibal & the Headhunters =

American rock band

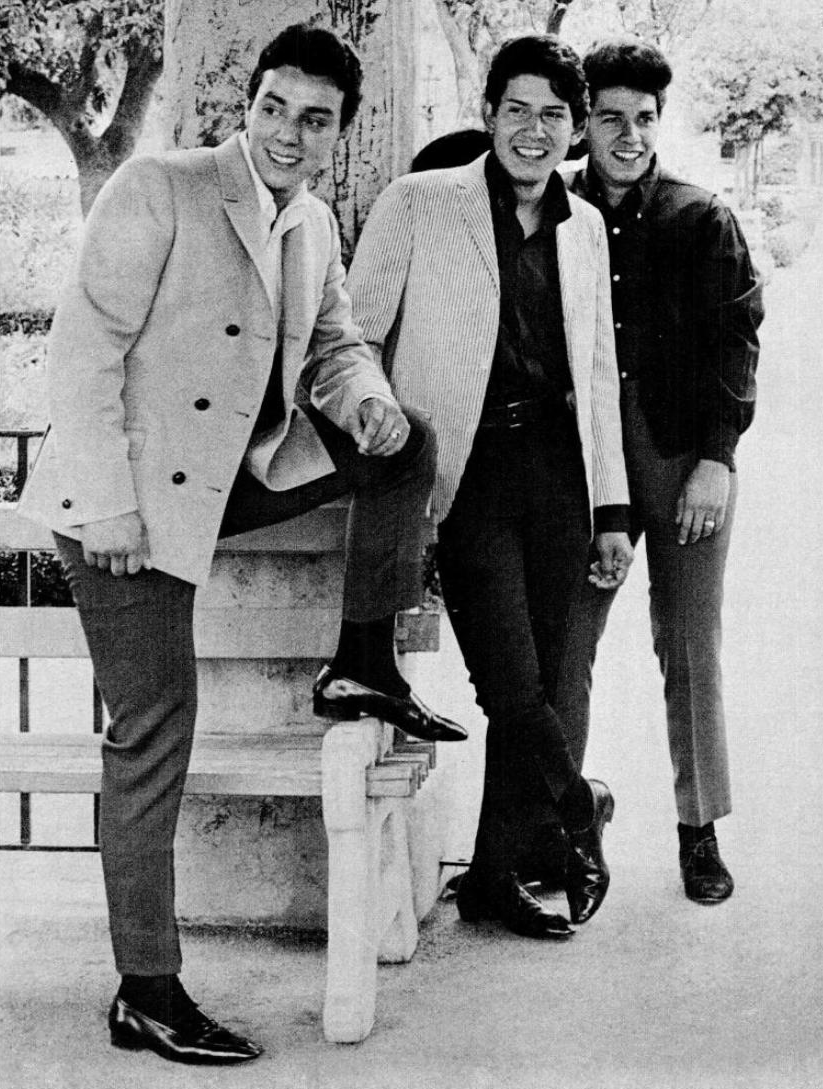
- Cannibal & the Headhunters in 1966

Background information
- Origin: East Los Angeles, California, U.S.
- Genre: Rock
- Members: Robert Zapata; Charlie Munoz; Robert Robles; David Jaramillo; Dave Goldstein; George Garcia
- Past members: Francisco Mario "Frankie" (Cannibal) Garcia; Robert Jaramillo; Joe Jaramillo; Richard Lopez

Cannibal & the Headhunters were an American rock band from East Los Angeles, California. They were one of the first Mexican-American groups to have a national hit record, "Land of a Thousand Dances", recorded on the Rampart label. They were the opening act on The Beatles' second American tour, backed up by the King Curtis band. They played at the historic Shea Stadium concert from August 15 to August 30, during the 1965 tour that was headlined by The Beatles.

== Career ==
They were discovered by Rampart Records label owner and founder Eddie Davis. They were among the 1960s Mexican-American musicians and singers who pioneered the "East Side Sound" of Los Angeles, a musical phenomenon that attracted international attention.

Francisco Mario (Frankie Cannibal) Garcia founded the group in 1965; the other group members were Bobby and Joe "Yo Yo" Jaramillo and Richard Lopez who were in the group for 18 months. Barely out of high school, they came from Ramona Gardens and Estrada Courts Housing Projects of East Los Angeles, inspired by the African American doo-wop groups in their neighborhoods. Garcia attended Andrew Jackson High School. He frequently sang spontaneously while walking around campus. This group toured, recorded, and performed together for 18 months, when Frankie "Cannibal" Garcia hired two new background singers, Eddie Serrano and George Ochoa, as the new Headhunters.

Their version of "Land of a Thousand Dances" was a remake of the original Chris Kenner tune, arranged and produced by Max Uballez with Frankie Garcia, and engineered by Bruce Morgan. The record reached No. 30 in the Billboard Hot 100 chart in early 1965, and No. 42 in Canada. The single's success would lead them to record an album with the same name, which reached No. 141 in the US. Wilson Pickett recorded the song into a national hit in 1967, also using the "na, na, na, na" lyric.

On May 7, 1965, Cannibal and the Headhunters performed in a concert for WVOK with the Rolling Stones, the Beach Boys, the Righteous Brothers, and Marty Robbins in Birmingham, Alabama at Legion Field. Three months later, Paul McCartney requested that Garcia and his group join the Beatles tour, from August 15 through August 31, 1965, at Shea Stadium New York and at the Hollywood Bowl California.

Frankie "Cannibal" Garica, leader since the group's formation, died on January 21, 1996, aged 49. Joe Jaramillo died of cirrhosis in 2000, and Lopez died of lung cancer on July 30, 2010, aged 65. Robert Jaramillo died on August 8, 2025.

In 2012, Richard Lopez and Albert Garcia, who performed and sang as members of the original Cannibal and the Headhunters, filed an opposition with the United States Patent and Trademark Office contesting Robert L. Zapata’s application to register the group’s name as a trademark. The case, heard before the Trademark Trial and Appeal Board (TTAB Proceeding No. 91204521), argued that the name Cannibal and the Headhunters originated with the original vocal group formed in 1964 and that Zapata, who joined years later, was not entitled to exclusive ownership of the mark. The case was dismissed with prejudice and the opposition proceeding terminated on August 27, 2013.
