= Lydia Murdock =

American pop singer

- Also known as: Lydia Murdoch
- Origin: USA
- Occupation: Singer
- Instrument: Voice
- Labels: Team Entertainment Records, WEA, Unidisc

Lydia Murdock is an American singer who had at least two dance hits. Her best known one was "Superstar" which was a hit in the UK and Canada. She also charted in the UK with "Love on the Line".

== Background ==
Lydia Murdock is an American pop singer from New Jersey She is best known for her answer song to Michael Jackson's "Billie Jean", known as "Superstar", where she portrayed Billie Jean saying that she's "mad as hell" in the song's lyrics. The song was a hit, peaking at #14 in the UK in October 1983.

== Career ==
=== Superstar ===
On the week of 7 October 1983, "Superstar" made its debut at no. 36 on the Radio & Records National Airplay / 40 chart.

On the week of 8 October, her single was a breakout in Canada and was at 5–15 on radio CKOI-FM in Montreal. It had also made its debut at no. 50 on the RPM Weekly Top 50 Singles chart. It peaked at no. 26 on the RPM chart on week seven on the week of 19 November. It held that position for another week.

On the main UK chart, the single made its debut on 17 September and spending ten weeks in the charts, it peaked at no. 14.

Murdock's single won her an award. She came fourth in the Cash Box 1983 Black Contemporary Singles Awards New Female section with Diane Richards, Madonna, Alfie Silas and Pamela Nivens at 1, 2, 3 and 5 respectively.

Superstar also made the Euro Tip Sheet European Top 100 Singles chart. On the week of 30 April, it had moved up from 86 to 62.

==== Further activities ====
Murdock recorded the Michael Burton composition, "Life in America" which was produced by Jerry Gabinelli and Burton. A club mix by D.J. Raphael Negron was released in 1984 in 12" format on Team Entertainment TRS 3003.

=== Love on the Line ===
Murdock recorded the single "Love on the Line" which was released in 12" format in the US on Team Entertainment TRS3006. It was written by Michael Burton and produced by Gerry Gabinelli, Bobby Eli, and Tony Bongiovi. It was released in the UK on WEA YZ17T. It was reviewed by James Hamilton who confirmed that it was selling well in the UK. However Hamilton said her lamenting about her man's phone line being busy was a bit nagging. It was also reviewed that same week by Jerry Smith in Music Week. He said that it was a strong dance single and noted the catchy vocal harmonies and sweeping strings. And even though he said that it was another song about telephones, he said that the chorus was memorable, and it should do well.

Murdock's song lyrics for "Love on the Line" and her photo was featured in the 25 August 1984 issue of Number One magazine. That week the single debuted on the UK Disco Top 85 chart at number 55.

It was reported by Music Week in the magazine's 8 September issue that "Love on the Line" had debuted at no. 49 on the Music Week Top Disco & Dance Singles chart.

"Love on the Line" was a recommended single in the 13 October issue of Billboard.

In Montreal, Canada, "Love on the Line" debuted at no. 40 on the Radio CKGM 98 chart on the week of 1 February 1985.

==== Further activities ====
In 1985 her single "Tonight Tonight" was released in Canada on Unidisc 7UN-190.

== Discography ==
=== US ===
US singles 7" & 12"
Act	Release	Catalogue	Year	Notes
Lydia Murdock	"Superstar" (Vocal & rap) / Superstar (Vocal only)	Team Entertainment TRS3001J	1983	(7" juke box release)
Lydia Murdock	"Superstar" (Long version) / "Superstar" (Instrumental version)	Team Entertainment TRS 3001	1983	(12" 33⅓ RPM); Hauppauge Pressing
Lydia Murdock	"Life in America" (Long version), "Life in America" (Instrumental) / "Life in America" (Club mix)	Team Entertainment TRS3003	1984	(12", 33⅓ RPM)
Lydia Murdock	"Love On The Line" (Edited for radio), "Love On The Line" (Instrumental version) / Love on the Line (Club mix)	Team Entertainment TRS3006	1984	(12", 33⅓ RPM)

=== Canada ===
Album
Act	Release	Catalogue	Year	Notes
Lydia Murdock	Superstar	Undidisc SPLK-7107	1993	CD
