= Just a Groove (Glen Adams Affair song) =

"Just a Groove" was a 1980 single for the Glen Adams Affair. It was a hit for the ensemble in the United States, but in the UK where it was first imported, then released as "Just a Groove (Remix)" was where it had its best success.

== Overview ==
It was reported in the 8 November 1980 of Billboard that Daniel Glass of SAM Records was pinning a lot of hope on the pending release of "Just a Groove" in the US which had already been released in the UK via a distribution deal with Excalibur Records. The UK release on Excaliber records was remixed for the UK market.

Both versions, the original Sam Records version (115 BPM) and the remix version on Excaliber Records (117 BPM) charted in the UK. The UK release was remixed for the UK market. The remix version when it became available took the place of the original version.

== Just a Groove ==
"Just a Groove"

Song
- A-side: "Just a Groove"
- B-side: "We've Got to Make It"
- Released: 1980
- Length: 6:18 (US release)
- Label: Sam Records S-12335 (US release)
- Songwriter: Glen Adams
- Producer: Glen Adams

=== Background ===
"Just a Groove" backed with "We've Got to Make It" was released in the United States in 12" format on Sam Records S-12335 in 1980.

=== Reception ===
In the US, Brian Chin wrote in his review in the 27 September 1980 issue of Record World that the record was what the title suggested. He said that the female vocals were similar to those of the group Skyy and with it currently appearing on the magazine's reporter lists, it could be one of those grass -roots street hits that has a sudden pick up.

In the UK, editor Beverley of the UK Smash Hits magazine asked readers about their thoughts on the local clubs, music and fashion scene. Two weeks later in issue 27 November - 10 December, the answers were printed. Glen Adams was one of the favorites for jazz funk enthusiasts for Friday night at the Goldmine in Canvey Island.

=== Airplay ===
According to the 25 October issue of Cash Box, the record was added to the playlist of WILD in Boston.

=== Club ===
==== Discotheque Hit Parade ====
The record was on the Record World Discotheque Hit Parade chart, High Rollers New York list for the week of 27 September. It was on the Record World Discotheque Hit Parade chart, Electric Circus list for the week of 7 November.

=== Chart ===
==== Record Mirror ====
On the week of 25 October 1980, "Just a Groove" (US Sam release) made its debut at no. 46 in the Record Mirror UK Disco chart. It got to no. 27 on the week of 15 November. The following week, the remix version on Excaliber Records was in its place at no. 26.

==== Smash Hits ====
In the period of 30 October - 12 November, "Just a Groove" debuted on the Smash Hits Disco Top 40 chart at no. 23. By the following fortnight, it was no longer in the chart.

== Just a Groove (Remix) ==
"Just a Groove (Remix)"

Song
- A-side: "Just a Groove"
- B-side: "Just a Groove"
- Released: 1980
- Length: 5:36
- Label: Excaliber Records Ltd EXCL 502 (UK release)
- Songwriter: Glen Adams
- Producer: Glen Adams

=== Background ===
According to James Hamilton in his Odds 'n' Bods section (Record Mirror 18 October, 1980) "Just a Groove" was to be issued on the Excaliber label with a nicely flowing remix flip. The label was headed by Morgan Khan. Adams who used to live in England was quoted in the 29 November issue of Record Mirror, as saying to Kahn that he was keen for him to make the record a smash so he could do Top of the Pops and see London again. According to the 3 November 1980 issue of Record Business, the Excaliber release of "Just a Groove (cat# Excaliber EXC(L) 502) was one of the records due in the shops that weekend.

In addition to the 12" format release, the record was also issued in the UK in a 7" format.

=== Reception ===
"Just a Groove" was one of the Select Singles in the 15 November issue of Music Week. The record was reviewed by Tony Jasper. He mentioned that the record was re-mixed for the UK market. He also mentioned the girls and their chanting of disco instructions, the long instrumental break on the 12" version and the return of the girls' vocals. Also the same week, James Hamilton of Record Mirror gave a review that wasn't that complementary. He said it was another shopgirl-aimed Young & Co-like monotonous mindless chix-chanted thudder. He also made a remark that it was set to a Chic beat with 117bpm and the original on the flip side was 116bpm.

Adams was pictured with two female singers from his Glen Adams Affair ensemble in the 29 November issue of ''Record Mirror.

=== Airplay ===
On the week of 6 December as reported by Music Week, the record was seeing airplay action at Manx Radio where it was on the station's A list, Pennine Radio where it was on the station's B list and Piccadilly where it was on the station's B list.

On the week of 20 December, the record was a Hit Pick at Radio Hallam, on the B list of Radio Pennine and the C list of Piccadilly radio.

On the week of 27 December, record was on the Picadilly C List.

=== Chart ===
==== Smash Hits ====
During the period of 11 November - 24 November, the Just a Groove" remix version on the Excaliber label debuted in the Smash Hits Disco Top 40 chart at no. 8. By the next fortnight, it had dropped down to no. 17. This was its final chart position.

==== Record Mirror ====
The week of 22 November marked the first appearance of the remix version on the Excaliber label in the Record Mirror UK Disco chart. The record had moved up from no. 29 to no. 27. Prior to that, all chart entries were for the Sam Records version. On the week of 3 January 1981, "Just a Groove (Remix)" peaked at no. 11 on the Record Mirror UK Disco chart.

==== Record Business ====
By the week of 24 November, the Excaliber remix version of "Just a Groove" was at no. 49 in the Record Business Disco chart. Two weeks prior, the Sam Records version was in the chart at no. 51.
