= Valley Style =

Song by T-Ski Valley
- A-side: "Valley Style"
- B-side: "Valley Style (Dub mix)"
- Label: Capo Records 764
- Composer(s): M. Jackson, T. Cox, G. Adams
- Producer(s): Judy Mason and Glen Adams

"Valley Style" is a 1983 single for American rapper T-Ski Valley. It became a hit for him that year. Registering on the UK disco chart, it stayed in the chart for six weeks.

== Background ==
"Valley Style" has been described as a "Billie Jean" spin off. The single backed with a dub version was released in the United States on Capo 764.

== Reception ==
T-Ski Valley's single "Valley Style" was reviewed in the 30 July 1983 issue of Record Mirror. The reviewer referred to the recording as an answer to Michael Jackson's song "Billie Jean" . It was referred to as a great out of club house.

Barry Lazell commented on "Valley Style" in the 13 August issue of Music Week. He said with the record being half rap and half instrumental, DJs could get inventive. He would comment on the song again in a later issue.

== Charts ==
It was reported by Record Mirror in the 6 August issue that "Valley Style" was a breaker and bubbling under the Disco 85 chart. On 13 August, "Valley Style" debuted at no. 64 in the Record Mirror Disco chart. It peaked at no. 38 on 27 August.
