= Taana Gardner =

American singer (born 1960)

- Born: September 3, 1960 (age 65); Newark, New Jersey, U.S.
- Genres: Disco; boogie; post-disco; R&B
- Occupations: Singer, actress
- Instrument: Vocals
- Years active: 1972–present
- Label: West End

Taana Gardner (born September 3, 1960) is an American disco and post-disco singer and actress who found her success through West End Records since 1979. She is also a former member of the Aural Exciters.

== Early life ==
Born in Newark, New Jersey, Taana is the granddaughter of a professional opera singer. Her musical career began at the age of eleven when she became active in theater and joined the Harlem Children's Theater Group. Her theater debut was at Lincoln Center as the high priestess in Land of the Egyptians, a musical which she also co-wrote. Taana went on to perform with the Dance Theater of Harlem and the National Black Theater.

== Career ==
=== Musical beginnings: late 1970s–1980s ===
Vocalist Taana Gardner was one of the leading lights of West End Records, a New York City label that released influential disco during the late 1970s and early '80s. At a young age, Gardner knew that she wanted to act and sing. Her grandmother, a former opera singer, began giving her vocal lessons at the age of five. Before she hit her teens, she was already a playwright; her work was featured at the Lincoln Center and also at the Apollo.

Despite having an accomplished background at an early age, it was something of a fluke that she became involved with the disco scene. Producer and songwriter Kenton Nix had a song, "Work That Body," that needed vocals. An early instrumental version of the track had been auditioned and approved by the Paradise Garage DJ Larry Levan, and Levan immediately introduced Nix to West End (and part Paradise Garage) owner Mel Cheren. Cheren set Nix up, but the singer who was slated to record the vocals fell ill on the day they were supposed to be laid down. Nix's brother, who worked for Gardner's father, called up the Gardner household that day—Thanksgiving Day, 1978—and invited Taana down. Taana accepted, recorded her vocals, and also gained another gig that same day when members of Dr. Buzzard's Original Savannah Band overheard her voice and asked her to sing on the record they were working on. (This record actually turned out to be Spooks in Space by the Aural Exciters, released on Ze.)

"Work That Body," remixed by Levan, was an instant hit at the Paradise Garage, sparking a succession of West End classics helmed by Nix, sung by Gardner, and tweaked for maximum dance floor effect by Levan. "We Can Work It Out," "When You Touch Me," "Just Be a Friend," and "Paradise Express" came later in 1979, and the massive "Heartbeat" (the basis of "Lyrics 2 the Rhythm," the song from the "New Jack City" soundtrack by The Essence, Ini Kamoze's ubiquitous 1995 summer hit "Here Comes the Hotstepper," and De La Soul's 1989 hit "Buddy" remix featuring Q-Tip, Phife Dawg, Jungle Brothers, Queen Latifah and Monie Love) and "No Frills" both followed in 1981.

=== Later years: late 1980s–present ===
Gardner took a step back from the limelight for several years to devote time to her children. 1985 saw the release of another Nix production, "Over You," for the YES label. She released a song produced by Guy Vaughn and Shedrick Guy of FlyGuy Production, co-produced by her around the same time for Next Plateau ("You Can't Keep Coming In and Out of My Life"), and a cover of LaBelle's "What Can I Do for You?" appeared on Elegal in 1992. In 1998, she teamed up again with Nix and West End for "I'm Comin'." Four years later, West End issued the Anthology of a Diva compilation. Gardner has also lent her skills to several acts, including Kool & the Gang, Peabo Bryson, Edwin Starr,and Harold Melvin & the Blue Notes.

== Discography ==
Albums

- Taana Gardner (1979)

Singles

- "Work That Body" (1979)
- "When You Touch Me" (1979)
- "Heartbeat" (1981)
- "No Frills" (1981)
- "You Can't Keep Coming in and Out of My Life" (1988)
- "Over You" (1991)
- "What Can I Do for You" (1992)
- "I'm Comin'" (1998)
- "Work That Body (Remix)" (2000)
