= Glen Adams =

Jamaican musician (1945–2010)

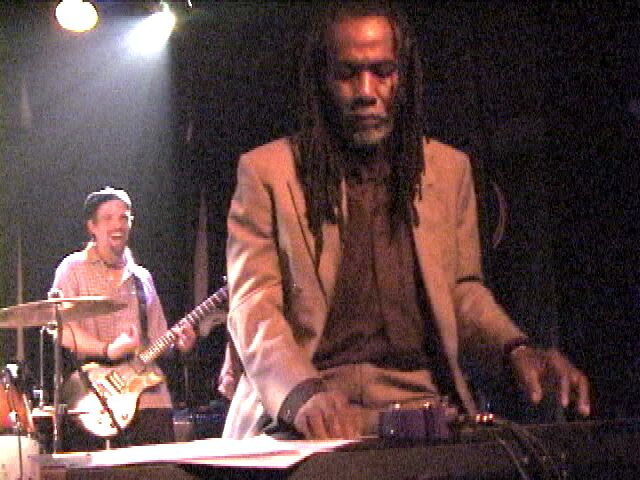
- Glen Adams performing with The Slackers in 2002

Background information
- Born: 27 November 1945
- Origin: Jones Town, Kingston, Jamaica
- Died: 17 December 2010 (aged 65)
- Genres: Ska, Rocksteady, Reggae
- Occupations: Record producer, instrumentalist
- Instrument: Keyboard
- Years active: 1960s–2010
- Label: Capo
- Formerly of: The Upsetters; The Hippy Boys; The Pioneers; Glen Adams Affair

Glen Adams (27 November 1945 – 17 December 2010) was a Jamaican musician, composer, arranger, engineer, producer, based since the mid-1970s in Brooklyn, New York City.

== Career ==
=== 1950s to 1960s ===
Adams' mother was from Kingston and his father from St. Vincent; the two met while working in Curaçao. Adams' first break in the music business came as a teenager, when he appeared as a singer in a vocal group on Radio Jamaica's Opportunity Knocks show hosted by Vere Johns. Later performing on the same show as a solo singer which led to appearances on cabaret shows and performances in Kingston and St. Andrews at weekends. Adams' older sister Yvonne was also a popular singer and he was spotted by Clement "Coxsone" Dodd while rehearsing a song that she had written called "Wonder Thirst". Coxsone took him into the Federal Recording Studio to record the track in 1960. Although not officially released as a single at the time, the song became a popular dub plate on sound systems, and the title of the song became his nickname.

Adams formed a duo, Ken and Glen, with Ken Boothe and they came second place in the 1966 Festival Song Competition with "I Remember". The duo also backed Stranger Cole on his number one single "Uno Dos Tres". He co-founded The Heptones before moving on to The Pioneers, appearing on the latter's "Shake It Up" and "Good Nanny". While continuing to earn a living as a tailor, he moved on to work with Duke Reid's Treasure Isle set-up as an informal musical director, introducing singers such as Joe White to Reid.

Adams also worked with Bunny Lee from around 1967 as a solo singer, backing singer and A&R man, in exchange for studio time. At a recording session in October 1968, when several musicians failed to turn up due to a dispute about payment for a previous session, Adams was asked to play piano, despite not being proficient on the instrument. Unhappy with the results, he switched instruments with organist Lloyd Charmers (although he had never played the organ before). He played organ on eight tracks in that session, which included Lester Sterling's "Bangarang" and Slim Smith's "Everybody Needs Love" and he has stuck with the instrument ever since, becoming a regular session player. Along with other musicians such as the Barrett brothers (Aston and Carlton), he performed in sessions for a range of producers under a variety of group names notably The Hippy Boys for Bunny Lee, where Adams did some of his most memorable work accompanying Slim Smith, The Reggae Boys and The Upsetters for Lee "Scratch" Perry. Adams also worked for Herman Chin Loy, where he was one of a number of keyboard players to record under the name Augustus Pablo, before Horace Swaby adopted that identity.

=== 1970s ===
Perry and The Upsetters toured the United Kingdom to capitalise on the success of Perry's hit "Return of Django" (and the less successful follow-up, "Live Injection"); returning to Jamaica in 1970. As part of The Upsetters, Adams backed The Wailers during their spell with Perry and Adams did much of the arranging and composed the song "Mr. Brown". The lyrics were inspired by a local tale about a duppy who was supposedly seen speeding around on a three-wheeled coffin with two "John Crows" (buzzards) on top, one of which would ask for "Mr. Brown". Adams was due to record the track himself but Perry suggested that the Wailers record it, with Peter Tosh and Adams adding spooky organ riffs. Adams regularly introduced this song at his concerts with the statement: "I wrote this song for Bob Marley". When The Wailers parted company with Perry in 1971 taking The Upsetter's rhythm section with them, Adams remained with Perry. During this period he had also started to split his time between Jamaica and the United States. In the United States he set up his own Capo record label and put together a new band, the Blue Grass Experience. He eventually moved to Brooklyn permanently in 1975, where he became more involved in producing and also worked for Brad Osbourne's Clocktower and Lloyd Barnes' Bullwackie labels and played with The Realistics band.

=== Late 1970s to 1980s ===
In the late 1970s, Adams expanded into R&B and rap production, working with hip hop artist T Ski Valley.

==== Glen Adams Affair ====
In 1980, Adams was leading his New York-based Glen Adams Affair. Brian Chin of Record World described the female vocal chanting on one of their songs "Just a Groove" as being similar to the female vocals of the group Skyy. They had success in the UK with "Just a Groove (Remix)" which peaked at no. 11 on the Record Mirror UK Disco chart on 3 January 1981.

In 1984, a record "Saturday Night" which was credited to Glen Adams Affair featuring T. Ski Valley was released on Nunk 1008. In the UK it was released on Master Mix 12CHE 8409. Debuting on the Record Mirror Disco chart at no. 79 on 10 November, it peaked three weeks later at no. 63 on 24 November.

==== Further activities ====
Adams co-wrote and co-produced T Ski Valley's single "Valley Style" which was released on Capo 764 in 1983. It became a hit on the Record Mirror UK Disco 85 chart, peaking at no. 38 on 27 August. It spent a total of six weeks in the chart..

=== 1990s to 2010s ===
Adams worked with Shaggy on his early recordings and remixed and re-voiced an album of partly Upsetters material in 1996, released by Heartbeat Records as Upsetters a Go Go.

After many years in the studio, Adams returned to live performance in the 2000s, touring the USA and Europe with The Slackers and also playing occasional NYC shows with the Jammyland All-Stars.

Adams owned his own recording studio and in his later years produced artists such as Susan Cadogan and Keith Rowe, half of the vocal duo Keith & Tex from Jamaica.

Glen Adams died on 17 December 2010 at the University Hospital of the West Indies after feeling ill while visiting Jamaica.

== Discography ==
=== Singles (non-comprehensive) ===
- "Far Away", 1967
- "Grab A Girl", 1968
- "Hey There Lonely Girl", 1968
- "Hold Down Miss Winey"
- "I Can't Help It", 1968
- "I Remember", 1967
- "I Wanna Hold Your Hand", 1968
- "My Argument", 1968
- "Run Come Dance", 1968
- "I'm Shocking, I'm Electric (She)", 1967
- "She's So Fine (I've Got A Girl)", 1968
- "Silent Lover", 1967
- "Taking Over Orange Street", 1968

=== Albums ===
- Upsetters – Blackboard Jungle Dub
- Glen Adams – Wonderthirst [1963–73] (LP) Landmark
