= Chris Kenner =

American singer and songwriter (1929–1976)

Background information
- Born: Christophe Kenner; December 25, 1929; Kenner, Louisiana, U.S.
- Died: January 25, 1976 (aged 46) New Orleans, Louisiana, U.S.
- Genre: R&B
- Occupations: Singer; songwriter
- Instrument: Vocals
- Years active: 1956–1976
- Labels: Baton; Imperial; Ron; Pontchartrain; Prigan; Instant; Uptown

Christophe Kenner (December 25, 1929 – January 25, 1976) was an American, New Orleans–based R&B singer and songwriter, best known for two hit singles in the early 1960s, "I Like It Like That" and "Land of 1000 Dances", which became staples in the repertoires of many other musicians.

== Biography ==
Born on Christmas Day, in the farming community of Kenner, Louisiana, upriver from New Orleans, Kenner sang gospel music with his church choir. He moved to New Orleans when he was in his teens, to work as a stevedore.

In 1955 he made his first recordings, for a small label, Baton Records, without success. In 1957, he recorded his "Sick and Tired" for Imperial Records. Kenner's recording reached No. 13 on the Billboard R&B chart. Fats Domino covered it the next year, and his version became a hit on the pop chart. "Rocket to the Moon" and "Life Is Just a Struggle", both cut for Ron Records, were other notable songs Kenner recorded in this period.

Moving to another New Orleans label, Instant (which initially was called 'Valiant' before they discovered the name was already in use), he began to work with the pianist and arranger Allen Toussaint. In 1961, this collaboration produced "I Like It Like That", his biggest and first pop hit, peaking at No. 2 on the Billboard Hot 100 chart (covered in 1965 by the Dave Clark Five), and "Something You Got" (covered by Wilson Pickett, Alvin Robinson, the Ramsey Lewis Trio, Johnny Rivers, Chuck Jackson and Maxine Brown, and Earl Grant, Fats Domino, Bobby Womack, the Moody Blues, the Searchers, the American Breed, Fairport Convention, Bruce Springsteen, Them, and Jimi Hendrix). "I Like It Like That" sold over one million copies, was nominated for a Grammy Award, and was awarded a gold disc by the Recording Industry Association of America.

In 1963 he released his most enduring song, "Land of 1000 Dances", based on an old spiritual. Kenner's version reached No. 77 on the pop chart in 1963. It was later covered by various artists, including Cannibal & the Headhunters, Fats Domino, Thee Midniters, Wilson Pickett, the Action, and Patti Smith. Kenner continued to record for Instant and for other small local labels, including many of his lesser-known songs from the 1960s, such as "My Wife", "Packing Up" and "They Took My Money". He released an album, Land of 1000 Dances, on Atlantic Records in 1966; it was reissued on CD by Collectors' Choice in 2007.

Kenner's career was affected by his unpredictable behavior – he drank and spent heavily, and he sometimes missed shows or forgot the words to his songs. He continued to record until 1968, with diminishing success. In 1968, Kenner was convicted of unlawful sex with a minor and spent three years in Louisiana's Angola prison.

Kenner died from a heart attack in 1976, at the age of 46, triggered by alcoholism.

== Chart singles ==
Year	Single	Chart Positions	
Year	Single	US Pop	US R&B
1957	"Sick and Tired"	—	13
1961	"I Like It Like That"	2	2
1962	"Land of 1000 Dances"	77	—

== Discography ==
- Don't Let Her Pin That Charge On Me / Grandma's House (Baton 220) Feb 1956
- Sick And Tired / Nothing Will Keep Me From You (Imperial 5448) Jun 1957
- I Have News For You / Will You Be Mine (Imperial 5488) Feb 1958
- Don't Make No Noise / You Can't Beat Uncle Sam (Pontchartrain 610P-8068) 1959
- Life Is Just A Struggle / Rocket To The Moon (Ron 335) 1960
- I Like It Like That (Parts 1 & 2) (Valiant 3229; Instant 3229) Mar 1961
- Packin' Up / A Very True Story (Instant 3234) Aug 1961
- Something You Got / Come See About Me (Instant 3237) Oct 1961
- How Far / Time (Instant 3244) Feb 1962
- Let Me Show You How (To Twist) / Johnny Little (Instant 3247) May 1962
- Land Of 1000 Dances / That's My Girl (Instant 3252) Oct 1962
- Come Back And See / Go Thru Life (With You) (Instant 3257) 1963
- What's Wrong With Life / Never Reach Perfection (Instant 3263) Jan 1964
- She Can Dance / Anybody Here See My Baby (Instant 3265) Apr 1964
- Timber (Parts 1 & 2) (as Candy Phillips) (Atlantic 2290) Jun 1965
- The Life Of My Baby / They Took My Money (Uptown 708) Aug 1965
- I'm The Greatest / Get On This Train (Uptown 716) Nov 1965
- I'm Lonely, Take Me / Cinderella (Instant 3277) Jul 1966
- All Night Rambler (Parts 1 & 2) (Instant 3280) Dec 1966
- Shoo Rah / Stretch My Hand To You (Instant 3283) 1967
- Fumigate Funky Broadway / Wind The Clock (Instant 3286) Sep 1967
- Memories Of A King (Let Freedom Ring) (Parts 1 & 2) (Instant 3290) Apr 1968
- Sad Mistake / Mini-Skirts And Soul (Instant 3293) May 1968
