= Instant Records =

Instant Records was an American independent record label based in New Orleans, Louisiana, United States, which was founded in 1961 by Joe Banashak (owner of Minit Records) and Irvin Smith. It was originally called Valiant Records until another Valiant Records threatened to sue and forced the label's renaming to Instant Records. The most successful artist on Instant was Chris Kenner. Several Instant recordings were distributed by Atlantic Records.

Skip Easterling's version of Willie Dixon's "I'm Your Hoochie Koochie Man" (1970) was Easterling's biggest success, but its release on Instant proved to be the finale of the label's chart career.
