= Listen to Your Heart (Diane Richards song) =

Song by Diane Richards

from the album Listen to Your Heart
- A-side: "Listen to Your Heart"
- B-side: "It's Ecstasy When You Lay Down Next to Me"
- Released: 1983
- Length: 3:22
- Label: Zoo York Recordz
- Composer: Billy Livsey/Frank Musker
- Producer: Butch Barbella

"Listen to Your Heart" was a 1983 single for singer Diane Richards. It became a hit for her that year, registering on the Cash Box and Billboard charts.

== Background ==
"Listen to Your Heart" was written by Billy Livsey and Frank Musker.

The song was recorded by 26-year-old Diane Richards who was new to this side of the music business in spite of having worked in radio and having appeared in Annie hall and Mahogany. The producers and arrangers on the recording were Butch Barbella and Nick Monroe. Richards' own view of her recording was that it was melodic and relaxing, not an aggressive type of song. The song appears on an album of the same name.

The single was released on Zoo York, while a 12" version of the single was also released.

== Reception ==
As one of the Top Single Picks, "Listen to Your Heart" was a recommended single in the Pop section of the 12 February issue of Billboard.

In an article about Diane Richards that appeared in the 2 April 1983 issue of Billboard, "Listen to Your Heart" was referred to as a promising effort.

== Airplay ==
in Cash Box magazine's 26 February 1983 issue, "Listen to Your Heart" was no. 2 on the Black Contemporary Most Added Singles list.

The single was mentioned in the Out Of The Box section of the 9 April issue of Billboard. The writer said that "Listen to Your Heart" had made real cross-over headway and with the proper director she could go a long way. However, the editor wrote that the song wasn't the sort of ballad that kept adult listenership.

Jimmy (Goodtime) Milner of WAWA in Milwaukee felt that the single was going all the way, saying, "flavor is in and this summertime groove is what's happening".

== Charts ==
On the week of 11 February, Diane Richards' single was added to the playlist of WWDM in Sumpter and KDIA on Oakland.

On the week of 26 February, "Listen to Your Heart" made its debut at no. 77 in the Cash Box Top 100 Black Contemporary Singles chart. On the week of 7 May and in its eleventh week, the single peaked at no. 29. It held that position for one more week. Having been in the chart for seventeen weeks, the single's last entry was at no. 99 on the week of 18 June.

On the week of 2 April, "Listen to Your Heart" jumped to no. 58 on the Billboard Black Singles Chart. It made it to no. 44 in the Billboard chart.

== Accolades ==
The single won Diane Richards an award. She came first in the Cash Box 1983 Black Contemporary Singles Awards New Female section.
