= Grammy Award for Song of the Year =

Honor presented at the Grammy Awards

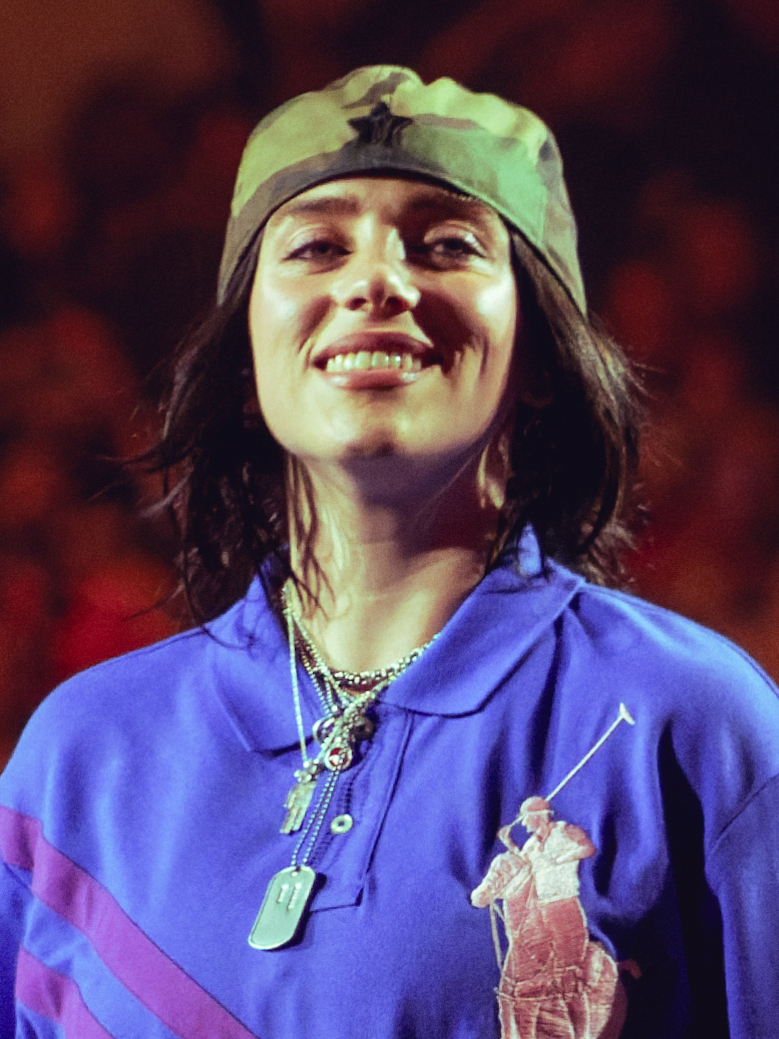
- "Wildflower" by Billie Eilish is the most recent recipient
- Awarded for: Quality song containing both lyrics and melody
- Country: United States
- Presented by: National Academy of Recording Arts and Sciences
- First award: 1959
- Currently held by: Billie Eilish – "Wildflower" (2026)

Highlights
- Most awards: Billie Eilish and Finneas O'Connell (3 each)
- Most nominations: Jack Antonoff and Taylor Swift (9 each)
- Website: grammy.com

The Grammy Award for Song of the Year is an honor presented at the Grammy Awards, a ceremony that was established in 1958 and originally called the Gramophone Awards. The Song of the Year award is one of the four most prestigious categories at the awards (alongside Best New Artist, Record of the Year and Album of the Year), presented annually since the 1st Grammy Awards in 1959. According to the 54th Grammy Awards description guide, the award is presented:

to honor artistic achievement, technical proficiency and overall excellence in the recording industry, without regard to album sales or chart position.

If a winning song contains samples or interpolations of existing material, the publisher and songwriter(s) of the original song(s) can apply for a Winners Certificate.

Song of the Year is related to but is conceptually different from Record of the Year or Album of the Year:

- Song of the Year is awarded for a single or for one track from an album. This award goes to the songwriter who actually wrote the lyrics and/or melodies to the song. "Song" in this context means the song as composed, not its recording.
- Record of the Year is also awarded for a single or individual track, but the recipient of this award is the performing artist, the producer, recording engineer and/or mixer for that song. In this sense, "record" means a particular recorded song, not its composition or an album of songs.
- Album of the Year is awarded for a whole album, and the award is presented to the artist, songwriter, producer, recording engineer, and mastering engineer for that album. In this context, "album" means a recorded collection of songs (a multi-track LP, CD, or download package), not the individual songs or their compositions.

== History and description ==
The Song of the Year awards have been awarded since 1959. It is one of the four most prestigious Grammy Awards. Despite both the Record of the Year award and Song of the Year being awarded for a single or for one track from an album, this award goes only to the composer(s) of the song whereas the Record of the Year award goes to the performer(s) and production team for a particular recording of the song. According to the 54th Grammy Awards description guide, the award is given to the songwriter(s) of a song that "must contain melody and lyrics and must be either a new song or a song first achieving prominence during the eligibility year. Songs containing prominent samples or interpolations are not eligible".

The award has not always been restricted to new or newly prominent songs; for instance, in 1992, when the winner was Natalie Cole's cover of "Unforgettable" (a song that had first been recorded by Nat King Cole and achieved prominence in the 1950s), the rule was merely that the song had to have been recorded during the eligibility year and not previously nominated for the award.

Since the late 1960s other songwriter's awards have been presented for genre-specific categories, including Grammy Award for Best Country Song (since 1965), Grammy Award for Best R&B Song (since 1969), Grammy Award for Best Song Written for Visual Media (since 1988), Grammy Award for Best Rock Song (since 1992), and most recently Grammy Award for Best Rap Song (since 2004), Grammy Award for Best Gospel Song (from 2006 to 2014), Grammy Award for Best Contemporary Christian Music Song (from 2012 to 2014), Grammy Award for Best American Roots Song (since 2014), Grammy Award for Best Gospel Performance/Song (since 2015), and Grammy Award for Best Contemporary Christian Music Performance/Song (since 2015).

The category was expanded to include eight nominees in 2019 and 10 nominees in 2022. The number of nominees was reverted to eight starting with the 2024 ceremony.

As of 2023, a distinct category to honor songwriters was established: Songwriter of the Year, Non-Classical.

== Achievements ==
In many cases, the winning songwriters were also the performers (Domenico Modugno, Henry Mancini, John Lennon & Paul McCartney, Joe South, Paul Simon, Carole King, Barbra Streisand, Billy Joel, Michael McDonald, Christopher Cross, Sting, Michael Jackson & Lionel Richie, Bobby McFerrin, Eric Clapton, Bruce Springsteen, Seal, Shawn Colvin, Rob Thomas, U2, Alicia Keys, Luther Vandross, John Mayer, Dixie Chicks, Amy Winehouse, Coldplay, Beyoncé, Lady Antebellum, Adele, Fun, Lorde, Sam Smith, Ed Sheeran, Bruno Mars, Childish Gambino, Billie Eilish, H.E.R., Anderson .Paak, Bonnie Raitt and Kendrick Lamar).

Siblings Billie Eilish and Finneas O'Connell are the songwriters with the most wins of this category, with three each for "Bad Guy" in 2020, "What Was I Made For?" in 2024, and "Wildflower" in 2026.

Dernst "D'Mile" Emile II is the only songwriter to win Song of the Year in two consecutive years: in 2021 ("I Can't Breathe") and 2022 ("Leave the Door Open"). Other multiple winners in this category include Henry Mancini ("Moon River" and "Days of Wine and Roses"); Johnny Mercer ("Moon River" and "Days of Wine and Roses"); James Horner ("Somewhere Out There" and "My Heart Will Go On"); Will Jennings ("Tears in Heaven" and "My Heart Will Go On"); U2 ("Beautiful Day" and "Sometimes You Can't Make It on Your Own"); Adele ("Rolling in the Deep" and "Hello"); Christopher Brody Brown ("That's What I Like" and "Leave the Door Open"); Bruno Mars ("That's What I Like" and "Leave the Door Open"), winning two times each. However, songs written for Andy Williams, Roberta Flack, Barbra Streisand and Bette Midler have received this award twice.

Taylor Swift and Jack Antonoff are the most nominated songwriters in this category with nine nominations each, with Antonoff winning in 2013 for “We Are Young”; while Swift has never won the award. Bruno Mars follows with eight nominations, and Beyoncé, Paul McCartney, Lionel Richie, Billie Eilish and Finneas O’ Connell have six nominations each.

Johnny Mercer, Jimmy Webb, Bobby Russell, Burt Bacharach, Hal David, Kris Kristofferson, Michael McDonald, Michael Jackson, Elton John, Tim Rice, Brandi Carlile, Dernst Emile II, Jack Antonoff, Amy Allen and Henry Walter are the only songwriters with multiple nominations in the same year, with Antonoff achieving it in three consecutive years; while Carlile and Emile in 2022, and Allen, Antonoff and Walter in 2026 achieved it in the same ceremony.

The first woman to win the award was Carole King in 1972, for "You've Got a Friend". Adele was the first female songwriter to win the award twice, winning for "Rolling in the Deep" and "Hello". Doja Cat and Doechii are the only female rappers to be nominated for the award with “Kiss Me More” in 2022 and "Anxiety" in 2026.

Lorde is the youngest songwriter to win in the category, winning for "Royals" in 2014 at the age of 17; while Irving Gordon is the oldest songwriter to win the award, winning for "Unforgettable" in 1992 at age 77.

Christopher Cross and Billie Eilish are the only artists to receive the Grammys for Song of the Year as well as Record of the Year, Album of the Year, and Best New Artist in a single ceremony. Adele was the first artist to win the awards for Song of the Year, Record of the Year, Album of the Year, and Best New Artist on separate occasions. Only six artists have won the Song of the Year and Best New Artist awards the same year: Christopher Cross ("Sailing" in 1981), Alicia Keys ("Fallin'" in 2002), Amy Winehouse ("Rehab" in 2008), Fun ("We Are Young" in 2013), Sam Smith ("Stay with Me (Darkchild Version)" in 2015) and Billie Eilish ("Bad Guy" in 2020); Marvin Hamlisch is the only composer to win the Song of the Year and Best New Artist awards the same year in 1975, for "The Way We Were".

John Lennon, Paul McCartney, Lionel Richie, Diane Warren, Max Martin, Billie Eilish, H.E.R, Finneas O'Connell, Taylor Swift, and Jack Antonoff are the only songwriters to receive nominations for Song of the Year in three consecutive years, with Eilish and O’Connell achieving it twice.

The song "Nel blu, dipinto di blu (Volare)", winner in 1959, written by Domenico Modugno and performed in Italian, is the only foreign-language song to win this award, although the 1967 winner "Michelle" penned by Lennon–McCartney for The Beatles to perform, has a critical part of its lyrics in French.

The Ernest Gold song "Theme of Exodus", which won in 1961, is the only instrumental song to ever receive this award. "Lose Yourself" by Eminem was the first rap song to be nominated while "This Is America" by Childish Gambino and "Not Like Us" by Kendrick Lamar are the only ones to ever win the award. “Poker Face” by Lady Gaga, “Break My Soul” by Beyoncé and “Abracadabra” by Gaga are the only dance songs to be nominated. “A&W” by Lana Del Rey was the first alternative song to be nominated.

The first and only tie in this category in Grammy history took place in 1978, when both Barbra Streisand's & Paul Williams' "Evergreen (Love Theme from A Star Is Born)" and Joe Brooks' "You Light Up My Life" won the award.

The first time in Grammy history that two different songs with the same title have been nominated in this category happened with "Hello" written by Lionel Richie in 1985 and "Hello" by Adele & Greg Kurstin in 2017.

The song with the most writers to win this award is "That's What I Like", which won in 2018 with eight writers. The song with the most writers nominated in this category is "Peaches", which had 11 co-writers nominated for the 2022 ceremony.

Thirty-two of the winning songs have also won the award for Record of the Year. 27 of the winning songs were written by solo songwriters. 9 of the winning songs also won the Academy Award for Best Original Song.

== Process ==
From 1995 to 2018, members of the National Academy of Recording Arts and Sciences nominated their choices for song of the year. A list of the top twenty records was given to the Nominations Review Committee, a specially selected group of anonymous members, who then selected the top five records to gain a nomination in the category in a special ballot. The rest of the members then vote a winner from the five nominees. In 2018, it was announced the number of nominated tracks would be increased to eight. In 2021, it was announced that the Nomination Review Committees would be disbanded, and the final nominees for song of the year would be decided by votes from members. Starting in 2022, the number of nominees in the category increased to 10. However, the decision to expand the number of nominees in this category was made 24 hours before the nominees were announced after an early version of the nominations list had already been circulated. This allowed "Kiss Me More" by Doja Cat featuring SZA and "Right on Time" by Brandi Carlile to be nominated as they were the songs that received the most votes besides the other eight nominees. As of the 2024 ceremony, the number of nominees has been reduced back to eight.

== Recipients ==
=== 1950s ===
Year^{[I]}	Song	Songwriter(s)	Artist(s)
1959
1959	"Nel blu, dipinto di blu (Volare)"	Domenico Modugno	Domenico Modugno
1959	"Catch a Falling Star"	Paul Vance and Lee Pockriss	Perry Como
1959	"Fever"	John Davenport and Eddie Cooley	Peggy Lee
1959	"Gigi"	Alan Jay Lerner and Frederick Loewe	Louis Jourdan
1959	"Witchcraft"	Cy Coleman and Carolyn Leigh	Frank Sinatra

=== 1960s ===
Year^{[I]}	Song	Songwriter(s)	Artist(s)
1960
1960	"The Battle of New Orleans"	Jimmy Driftwood	Johnny Horton
1960	"High Hopes"	Sammy Cahn and Jimmy Van Heusen	Frank Sinatra
1960	"I Know"	Karl Stutz and Edith Linderman	Perry Como
1960	"Like Young"	Paul Francis Webster and André Previn	André Previn
1960	"Small World"	Jule Styne and Stephen Sondheim	Johnny Mathis
1961
1961	"Theme from Exodus"	Ernest Gold	Ernest Gold
1961	"He'll Have to Go"	Charles Randolph Grean, Joe Allison and Audrey Allison	Jim Reeves
1961	"Nice 'n' Easy"	Lew Spence, Marilyn Keith and Alan Bergman	Frank Sinatra
1961	"The Second Time Around"	Sammy Cahn and Jimmy Van Heusen	Andy Williams
1961	"Theme from A Summer Place"	Max Steiner	Percy Faith
1962
1962	"Moon River"	Henry Mancini and Johnny Mercer	Henry Mancini
1962	"Big Bad John"	Jimmy Dean	Jimmy Dean
1962	"A Little Bitty Tear"	Hank Cochran	Burl Ives
1962	"Lollipops and Roses"	Tony Velona	Jack Jones
1962	"Make Someone Happy"	Jule Styne, Betty Comden and Adolph Green	Various Artists
1963
1963	"What Kind of Fool Am I?"	Leslie Bricusse and Anthony Newley	Sammy Davis Jr.
1963	"As Long as He Needs Me"	Lionel Bart	Shirley Bassey
1963	"I Left My Heart in San Francisco"	Douglas Cross and George Cory	Tony Bennett
1963	"My Coloring Book"	John Kander and Fred Ebb	Sandy Stewart
1963	"The Sweetest Sounds"	Richard Rodgers	Various Artists
1964
1964	"Days of Wine and Roses"	Henry Mancini and Johnny Mercer	Henry Mancini
1964	"Call Me Irresponsible"	Sammy Cahn and Jimmy Van Heusen	Frank Sinatra
1964	"The Good Life"	Sacha Distel and Jack Reardon	Tony Bennett
1964	"I Wanna Be Around"	Sadie Vimmerstedt and Johnny Mercer	Tony Bennett
1964	"Wives and Lovers"	Burt Bacharach and Hal David	Jack Jones
1965
1965	"Hello, Dolly!"	Jerry Herman	Louis Armstrong
1965	"Dear Heart"	Henry Mancini, Ray Evans and Jay Livingston	Andy Williams
1965	"A Hard Day's Night"	John Lennon and Paul McCartney	The Beatles
1965	"People"	Jule Styne and Bob Merrill	Barbra Streisand
1965	"Who Can I Turn To?"	Leslie Bricusse and Anthony Newley	Tony Bennett
1966
1966	"The Shadow of Your Smile"	Paul Francis Webster and Johnny Mandel	Tony Bennett
1966	"I Will Wait for You"	Michel Legrand, Norman Gimbel and Jacques Demy	Connie Francis
1966	"King of the Road"	Roger Miller	Roger Miller
1966	"The September of My Years"	Jimmy Van Heusen and Sammy Cahn	Frank Sinatra
1966	"Yesterday"	John Lennon and Paul McCartney	The Beatles
1967
1967	"Michelle"	John Lennon and Paul McCartney	The Beatles
1967	"Born Free"	John Barry and Don Black	Various Artists
1967	"The Impossible Dream"	Mitch Leigh and Joe Darion	Richard Kiley
1967	"Somewhere, My Love"	Paul Francis Webster and Maurice Jarre	Ray Conniff
1967	"Strangers in the Night"	Bert Kaempfert, Charles Singleton and Eddie Snyder	Frank Sinatra
1968
1968	"Up, Up, and Away"	Jimmy Webb	The 5th Dimension
1968	"By the Time I Get to Phoenix"	Jimmy Webb	Glen Campbell
1968	"Gentle on My Mind"	John Hartford	Glen Campbell
1968	"My Cup Runneth Over"	Tom Jones and Harvey Schmidt	Ed Ames
1968	"Ode to Billie Joe"	Bobbie Gentry	Bobbie Gentry
1969
1969	"Little Green Apples"	Bobby Russell	O. C. Smith
1969	"Harper Valley PTA"	Tom T. Hall	Jeannie C. Riley
1969	"Hey Jude"	John Lennon and Paul McCartney	The Beatles
1969	"Honey"	Bobby Russell	Bobby Goldsboro
1969	"Mrs. Robinson"	Paul Simon	Simon & Garfunkel

=== 1970s ===
Year^{[I]}	Song	Songwriter(s)	Artist(s)
1970
1970	"Games People Play"	Joe South	Joe South
1970	"I'll Never Fall in Love Again"	Burt Bacharach and Hal David	Dionne Warwick
1970	"A Time for Us"	Larry Kusik, Eddie Snyder and Nino Rota	Henry Mancini
1970	"Raindrops Keep Fallin' on My Head"	Burt Bacharach and Hal David	B. J. Thomas
1970	"Spinning Wheel"	David Clayton-Thomas	Blood, Sweat & Tears
1971
1971	"Bridge over Troubled Water"	Paul Simon	Simon & Garfunkel
1971	"Everything Is Beautiful"	Ray Stevens	Ray Stevens
1971	"Fire and Rain"	James Taylor	James Taylor
1971	"Let It Be"	John Lennon and Paul McCartney	The Beatles
1971	"We've Only Just Begun"	Roger Nichols and Paul Williams	The Carpenters
1972
1972	"You've Got a Friend"	Carole King	James Taylor / Carole King
1972	"Help Me Make It Through the Night"	Kris Kristofferson	Kris Kristofferson
1972	"It's Impossible"	Sid Wayne and Armando Manzanero	Perry Como
1972	"Me and Bobby McGee"	Kris Kristofferson and Fred Foster	Janis Joplin
1972	"Rose Garden"	Joe South	Lynn Anderson
1973
1973	"The First Time Ever I Saw Your Face"	Ewan MacColl	Roberta Flack
1973	"Alone Again (Naturally)"	Gilbert O'Sullivan	Gilbert O'Sullivan
1973	"American Pie"	Don McLean	Don McLean
1973	"Song Sung Blue"	Neil Diamond	Neil Diamond
1973	"The Summer Knows"	Alan and Marilyn Bergman and Michel Legrand	Michel Legrand
1974
1974	"Killing Me Softly with His Song"	Norman Gimbel and Charles Fox	Roberta Flack
1974	"Behind Closed Doors"	Kenny O'Dell	Charlie Rich
1974	"Tie a Yellow Ribbon Round the Ole Oak Tree"	Irwin Levine and L. Russell Brown	Dawn featuring Tony Orlando
1974	"You Are the Sunshine of My Life"	Stevie Wonder	Stevie Wonder
1974	"You're So Vain"	Carly Simon	Carly Simon
1975
1975	"The Way We Were"	Alan and Marilyn Bergman and Marvin Hamlisch	Barbra Streisand
1975	"Feel Like Makin' Love"	Gene McDaniels	Roberta Flack
1975	"I Honestly Love You"	Jeff Barry and Peter Allen	Olivia Newton-John
1975	"Midnight at the Oasis"	David Nichtern	Maria Muldaur
1975	"You and Me Against the World"	Paul Williams and Ken Ascher	Helen Reddy
1976
1976	"Send in the Clowns"	Stephen Sondheim	Judy Collins
1976	"At Seventeen"	Janis Ian	Janis Ian
1976	"Feelings"	Morris Albert	Morris Albert
1976	"Love Will Keep Us Together"	Neil Sedaka and Howard Greenfield	Captain & Tennille
1976	"Rhinestone Cowboy"	Larry Weiss	Glen Campbell
1977
1977	"I Write the Songs"	Bruce Johnston	Barry Manilow
1977	"Afternoon Delight"	Bill Danoff	Starland Vocal Band
1977	"Breaking Up Is Hard to Do"	Neil Sedaka and Howard Greenfield	Neil Sedaka
1977	"This Masquerade"	Leon Russell	George Benson
1977	"The Wreck of the Edmund Fitzgerald"	Gordon Lightfoot	Gordon Lightfoot
1978
1978	"Evergreen (Love Theme from A Star Is Born)" (TIE)	Barbra Streisand and Paul Williams	Barbra Streisand
1978	"You Light Up My Life" (TIE)	Joe Brooks	Debby Boone
1978	"Don't It Make My Brown Eyes Blue"	Richard Leigh	Crystal Gayle
1978	"Hotel California"	Don Felder, Don Henley and Glenn Frey	Eagles
1978	"Nobody Does It Better"	Marvin Hamlisch and Carole Bayer Sager	Carly Simon
1978	"Southern Nights"	Allen Toussaint	Glen Campbell
1979
1979	"Just the Way You Are"	Billy Joel	Billy Joel
1979	"Stayin' Alive"	Barry Gibb, Robin Gibb and Maurice Gibb	Bee Gees
1979	"Three Times a Lady"	Lionel Richie	Commodores
1979	"You Don't Bring Me Flowers"	Neil Diamond and Alan and Marilyn Bergman	Neil Diamond and Barbra Streisand
1979	"You Needed Me"	Randy Goodrum	Anne Murray

=== 1980s ===
Year^{[I]}	Song	Songwriter(s)	Artist(s)
1980
1980	"What a Fool Believes"	Kenny Loggins and Michael McDonald	The Doobie Brothers
1980	"After the Love Has Gone"	David Foster, Jay Graydon and Bill Champlin	Earth, Wind & Fire
1980	"Chuck E.'s in Love"	Rickie Lee Jones	Rickie Lee Jones
1980	"Honesty"	Billy Joel	Billy Joel
1980	"I Will Survive"	Dino Fekaris and Freddie Perren	Gloria Gaynor
1980	"Minute by Minute"	Lester Abrams and Michael McDonald	The Doobie Brothers
1980	"Reunited"	Dino Fekaris and Freddie Perren	Peaches & Herb
1980	"She Believes in Me"	Steve Gibb	Kenny Rogers
1981
1981	"Sailing"	Christopher Cross	Christopher Cross
1981	"Fame"	Michael Gore and Dean Pitchford	Irene Cara
1981	"Lady"	Lionel Richie	Kenny Rogers
1981	"The Rose"	Amanda McBroom	Bette Midler
1981	"Theme from New York, New York"	John Kander and Fred Ebb	Frank Sinatra
1981	"Woman in Love"	Barry Gibb and Robin Gibb	Barbra Streisand
1982
1982	"Bette Davis Eyes"	Donna Weiss and Jackie DeShannon	Kim Carnes
1982	"Arthur's Theme (Best That You Can Do)"	Peter Allen, Burt Bacharach, Carole Bayer Sager and Christopher Cross	Christopher Cross
1982	"Endless Love"	Lionel Richie	Diana Ross & Lionel Richie
1982	"Just the Two of Us"	Bill Withers, William Salter and Ralph MacDonald	Grover Washington Jr. with Bill Withers
1982	"9 to 5"	Dolly Parton	Dolly Parton
1983
1983	"Always on My Mind"	Johnny Christopher, Mark James and Wayne Carson	Willie Nelson
1983	"Ebony and Ivory"	Paul McCartney	Paul McCartney and Stevie Wonder
1983	"Eye of the Tiger"	Frankie Sullivan and Jim Peterik	Survivor
1983	"I.G.Y. (What a Beautiful World)"	Donald Fagen	Donald Fagen
1983	"Rosanna"	David Paich	Toto
1984
1984	"Every Breath You Take"	Sting	The Police
1984	"All Night Long (All Night)"	Lionel Richie	Lionel Richie
1984	"Beat It"	Michael Jackson	Michael Jackson
1984	"Billie Jean"	Michael Jackson	Michael Jackson
1984	"Maniac"	Michael Sembello and Dennis Matkosky	Michael Sembello
1985
1985	"What's Love Got to Do with It"	Graham Lyle and Terry Britten	Tina Turner
1985	"Against All Odds (Take a Look at Me Now)"	Phil Collins	Phil Collins
1985	"Hello"	Lionel Richie	Lionel Richie
1985	"I Just Called to Say I Love You"	Stevie Wonder	Stevie Wonder
1985	"Time After Time"	Cyndi Lauper and Rob Hyman	Cyndi Lauper
1986
1986	"We Are the World"	Michael Jackson and Lionel Richie	USA for Africa
1986	"The Boys of Summer"	Don Henley and Mike Campbell	Don Henley
1986	"Everytime You Go Away"	Daryl Hall	Paul Young
1986	"I Want to Know What Love Is"	Mick Jones	Foreigner
1986	"Money for Nothing"	Mark Knopfler and Sting	Dire Straits
1987
1987	"That's What Friends Are For"	Burt Bacharach and Carole Bayer Sager	Dionne Warwick & Friends (Elton John, Gladys Knight and Stevie Wonder)
1987	"Addicted to Love"	Robert Palmer	Robert Palmer
1987	"Graceland"	Paul Simon	Paul Simon
1987	"Higher Love"	Steve Winwood and Will Jennings	Steve Winwood
1987	"Sledgehammer"	Peter Gabriel	Peter Gabriel
1988
1988	"Somewhere Out There"	James Horner, Barry Mann and Cynthia Weil	Linda Ronstadt and James Ingram
1988	"Didn't We Almost Have It All"	Michael Masser and Will Jennings	Whitney Houston
1988	"I Still Haven't Found What I'm Looking For"	Adam Clayton, David Evans, Larry Mullen, Jr. and Paul Hewson	U2
1988	"La Bamba"	Ritchie Valens	Los Lobos
1988	"Luka"	Suzanne Vega	Suzanne Vega
1989
1989	"Don't Worry, Be Happy"	Bobby McFerrin	Bobby McFerrin
1989	"Be Still My Beating Heart"	Sting	Sting
1989	"Fast Car"	Tracy Chapman	Tracy Chapman
1989	"Giving You the Best That I Got"	Anita Baker, Skip Scarborough and Randy Holland	Anita Baker
1989	"Piano in the Dark"	Brenda Russell, Jeff Hall and Scott Cutler	Brenda Russell

=== 1990s ===
Year^{[I]}	Song	Songwriter(s)	Artist(s)
1990
1990	"Wind Beneath My Wings"	Larry Henley and Jeff Silbar	Bette Midler
1990	"Don't Know Much"	Barry Mann, Cynthia Weil and Tom Snow	Linda Ronstadt and Aaron Neville
1990	"The End of the Innocence"	Don Henley and Bruce Hornsby	Don Henley
1990	"The Living Years"	Mike Rutherford and B. A. Robertson	Mike + The Mechanics
1990	"We Didn't Start the Fire"	Billy Joel	Billy Joel
1991
1991	"From a Distance"	Julie Gold	Bette Midler
1991	"Another Day in Paradise"	Phil Collins	Phil Collins
1991	"Hold On"	Chynna Phillips, Glen Ballard and Carnie Wilson	Wilson Phillips
1991	"Nothing Compares 2 U"	Prince	Sinéad O'Connor
1991	"Vision of Love"	Mariah Carey and Ben Margulies	Mariah Carey
1992
1992	"Unforgettable"	Irving Gordon	Natalie Cole (with Nat King Cole)
1992	"Baby Baby"	Amy Grant and Keith Thomas	Amy Grant
1992	"(Everything I Do) I Do It for You"	Bryan Adams, Mutt Lange and Michael Kamen	Bryan Adams
1992	"Losing My Religion"	Bill Berry, Peter Buck, Mike Mills and Michael Stipe	R.E.M.
1992	"Walking in Memphis"	Marc Cohn	Marc Cohn
1993
1993	"Tears in Heaven"	Eric Clapton and Will Jennings	Eric Clapton
1993	"Achy Breaky Heart"	Don Von Tress	Billy Ray Cyrus
1993	"Beauty and the Beast"	Alan Menken and Howard Ashman	Celine Dion and Peabo Bryson
1993	"Constant Craving"	k.d. lang and Ben Mink	k.d. lang
1993	"Save the Best for Last"	Wendy Waldman, Jon Lind and Phil Galdston	Vanessa Williams
1994
1994	"A Whole New World"	Alan Menken and Tim Rice	Peabo Bryson and Regina Belle
1994	"Harvest Moon"	Neil Young	Neil Young
1994	"I'd Do Anything for Love (But I Won't Do That)"	Jim Steinman	Meat Loaf
1994	"If I Ever Lose My Faith in You"	Sting	Sting
1994	"The River of Dreams"	Billy Joel	Billy Joel
1995
1995	"Streets of Philadelphia"	Bruce Springsteen	Bruce Springsteen
1995	"All I Wanna Do"	David Baerwald, Bill Bottrell, Wyn Cooper, Sheryl Crow and Kevin Gilbert	Sheryl Crow
1995	"Can You Feel the Love Tonight"	Elton John and Tim Rice	Elton John
1995	"Circle of Life"	Elton John and Tim Rice	Elton John
1995	"I Swear"	Gary Baker and Frank J. Myers	John Michael Montgomery / All-4-One
1996
1996	"Kiss from a Rose"	Seal	Seal
1996	"One of Us"	Eric Bazilian	Joan Osborne
1996	"I Can Love You Like That"	Maribeth Derry, Sam Diamond and Jennifer Kimball	John Michael Montgomery / All-4-One
1996	"You Are Not Alone"	R. Kelly	Michael Jackson
1996	"You Oughta Know"	Glen Ballard and Alanis Morissette	Alanis Morissette
1997
1997	"Change the World"	Gordon Kennedy, Wayne Kirkpatrick and Tommy Sims	Eric Clapton
1997	"Because You Loved Me"	Diane Warren	Celine Dion
1997	"Blue"	Bill Mack	LeAnn Rimes
1997	"Exhale (Shoop Shoop)"	Kenneth "Babyface" Edmonds	Whitney Houston
1997	"Give Me One Reason"	Tracy Chapman	Tracy Chapman
1998
1998	"Sunny Came Home"	Shawn Colvin and John Leventhal	Shawn Colvin
1998	"Don't Speak"	Eric Stefani and Gwen Stefani	No Doubt
1998	"How Do I Live"	Diane Warren	LeAnn Rimes / Trisha Yearwood
1998	"I Believe I Can Fly"	R. Kelly	R. Kelly
1998	"Where Have All the Cowboys Gone?"	Paula Cole	Paula Cole
1999
1999	"My Heart Will Go On"	James Horner and Will Jennings	Celine Dion
1999	"I Don't Want to Miss a Thing"	Diane Warren	Aerosmith
1999	"Iris"	John Rzeznik	Goo Goo Dolls
1999	"Lean on Me"	Kirk Franklin	Kirk Franklin
1999	"You're Still the One"	Mutt Lange and Shania Twain	Shania Twain

=== 2000s ===
Year^{[I]}	Song	Songwriter(s)	Artist(s)
2000
2000	"Smooth"	Itaal Shur and Rob Thomas	Santana featuring Rob Thomas
2000	"I Want It That Way"	Andreas Carlsson and Max Martin	Backstreet Boys
2000	"Livin' la Vida Loca"	Desmond Child and Robi Dräco Rosa	Ricky Martin
2000	"Unpretty"	Tionne "T-Boz" Watkins and Dallas Austin	TLC
2000	"You've Got a Way"	Shania Twain and Mutt Lange	Shania Twain
2001
2001	"Beautiful Day"	Adam Clayton, David Evans, Larry Mullen Jr. and Paul Hewson	U2
2001	"Breathe"	Stephanie Bentley and Holly Lamar	Faith Hill
2001	"I Hope You Dance"	Mark Sanders and Tia Sillers	Lee Ann Womack
2001	"I Try"	Macy Gray, Jinsoo Lim, Jeremy Ruzumna and David Wilder	Macy Gray
2001	"Say My Name"	Beyoncé Knowles, Rodney Jerkins, LaShawn Daniels, Fred Jerkins III, LeToya, LaTavia Roberson and Kelly Rowland	Destiny's Child
2002
2002	"Fallin'"	Alicia Keys	Alicia Keys
2002	"Drops of Jupiter (Tell Me)"	Charlie Colin, Rob Hotchkiss, Patrick Monahan, Jimmy Stafford and Scott Underwood	Train
2002	"I'm Like a Bird"	Nelly Furtado	Nelly Furtado
2002	"Stuck in a Moment You Can't Get Out Of"	Adam Clayton, David Evans, Larry Mullen, Jr. and Paul Hewson	U2
2002	"Video"	India.Arie, Carlos "Six July" Broady and Shannon Sanders	India.Arie
2003
2003	"Don't Know Why"	Jesse Harris	Norah Jones
2003	"Complicated"	Avril Lavigne and The Matrix	Avril Lavigne
2003	"The Rising"	Bruce Springsteen	Bruce Springsteen
2003	"A Thousand Miles"	Vanessa Carlton	Vanessa Carlton
2003	"Where Were You (When the World Stopped Turning)"	Alan Jackson	Alan Jackson
2004
2004	"Dance with My Father"	Richard Marx and Luther Vandross	Luther Vandross
2004	"Beautiful"	Linda Perry	Christina Aguilera
2004	"I'm with You"	Avril Lavigne and The Matrix	Avril Lavigne
2004	"Keep Me in Your Heart"	Jorge Calderón and Warren Zevon	Warren Zevon
2004	"Lose Yourself"	Jeff Bass, Marshall Mathers and Luis Resto	Eminem
2005
2005	"Daughters"	John Mayer	John Mayer
2005	"If I Ain't Got You"	Alicia Keys	Alicia Keys
2005	"Jesus Walks"	Rhymefest and Kanye West	Kanye West
2005	"Live Like You Were Dying"	Tim Nichols and Craig Wiseman	Tim McGraw
2005	"The Reason"	Daniel Estrin and Douglas Robb	Hoobastank
2006
2006	"Sometimes You Can't Make It on Your Own"	Adam Clayton, David Evans, Larry Mullen Jr. and Paul Hewson	U2
2006	"Bless the Broken Road"	Bobby Boyd, Jeff Hanna and Marcus Hummon	Rascal Flatts
2006	"Devils & Dust"	Bruce Springsteen	Bruce Springsteen
2006	"Ordinary People"	John Legend and will.i.am	John Legend
2006	"We Belong Together"	Johntá Austin, Mariah Carey, Jermaine Dupri and Manuel Seal Jr.	Mariah Carey
2007
2007	"Not Ready to Make Nice"	Emily Robison, Martie Maguire, Natalie Maines and Dan Wilson	Dixie Chicks
2007	"Be Without You"	Johnta Austin, Mary J. Blige, Bryan-Michael Cox and Jason Perry	Mary J. Blige
2007	"Jesus, Take the Wheel"	Brett James, Hillary Lindsey and Gordie Sampson	Carrie Underwood
2007	"Put Your Records On"	John Beck, Steve Chrisanthou and Corinne Bailey Rae	Corinne Bailey Rae
2007	"You're Beautiful"	James Blunt, Amanda Ghost and Sacha Skarbek	James Blunt
2008
2008	"Rehab"	Amy Winehouse	Amy Winehouse
2008	"Before He Cheats"	Josh Kear and Chris Tompkins	Carrie Underwood
2008	"Hey There Delilah"	Tom Higgenson	Plain White T's
2008	"Like a Star"	Corinne Bailey Rae	Corinne Bailey Rae
2008	"Umbrella"	Kuk Harrell, Shawn Carter, Christopher Stewart and The-Dream	Rihanna featuring Jay-Z
2009
2009	"Viva la Vida"	Guy Berryman, Jonny Buckland, Will Champion and Chris Martin	Coldplay
2009	"American Boy"	Estelle, Keith Harris, John Legend, Josh Lopez, Caleb Speir, Kanye West and will.i.am	Estelle featuring Kanye West
2009	"Chasing Pavements"	Adele Adkins and Eg White	Adele
2009	"I'm Yours"	Jason Mraz	Jason Mraz
2009	"Love Song"	Sara Bareilles	Sara Bareilles

=== 2010s ===
Year^{[I]}	Song	Songwriter(s)	Artist(s)
2010
2010	"Single Ladies (Put a Ring on It)"	Thaddis Harrell, Beyoncé Knowles, Terius Nash and Christopher Stewart	Beyoncé
2010	"Poker Face"	Lady Gaga and RedOne	Lady Gaga
2010	"Pretty Wings"	Hod David and Musze	Maxwell
2010	"Use Somebody"	Caleb Followill and Jared Followill and Matthew Followill and Nathan Followill	Kings of Leon
2010	"You Belong with Me"	Liz Rose and Taylor Swift	Taylor Swift
2011
2011	"Need You Now"	Dave Haywood, Josh Kear, Charles Kelley and Hillary Scott	Lady Antebellum
2011	"Beg, Steal or Borrow"	Ray LaMontagne	Ray LaMontagne
2011	"F**k You"	Brody Brown, Cee Lo Green, Ari Levine, Philip Lawrence and Bruno Mars	Cee Lo Green
2011	"The House That Built Me"	Tom Douglas and Allen Shamblin	Miranda Lambert
2011	"Love the Way You Lie"	Alexander Grant, Skylar Grey and Marshall Mathers	Eminem featuring Rihanna
2012
2012	"Rolling in the Deep"	Adele Adkins and Paul Epworth	Adele
2012	"All of the Lights"	Jeff Bhasker, Stacy Ferguson, Malik Jones, Warren Trotter and Kanye West	Kanye West featuring Rihanna, Kid Cudi and Fergie
2012	"The Cave"	Ted Dwane, Ben Lovett, Marcus Mumford and Country Winston	Mumford & Sons
2012	"Grenade"	Brody Brown, Claude Kelly, Philip Lawrence, Ari Levine, Bruno Mars and Andrew Wyatt	Bruno Mars
2012	"Holocene"	Justin Vernon	Bon Iver
2013
2013	"We Are Young"	Nate Ruess, Jack Antonoff, Jeff Bhasker and Andrew Dost	Fun featuring Janelle Monáe
2013	"The A Team"	Ed Sheeran	Ed Sheeran
2013	"Adorn"	Miguel Pimentel	Miguel
2013	"Call Me Maybe"	Tavish Crowe, Carly Rae Jepsen and Josh Ramsay	Carly Rae Jepsen
2013	"Stronger (What Doesn't Kill You)"	Jörgen Elofsson, David Gamson, Greg Kurstin and Ali Tamposi	Kelly Clarkson
2014
2014	"Royals"	Joel Little and Ella Yelich-O'Connor	Lorde
2014	"Just Give Me a Reason"	Jeff Bhasker, Pink and Nate Ruess	Pink featuring Nate Ruess
2014	"Locked Out of Heaven"	Philip Lawrence, Ari Levine and Bruno Mars	Bruno Mars
2014	"Roar"	Lukasz Gottwald, Max Martin, Bonnie McKee, Katy Perry and Henry Walter	Katy Perry
2014	"Same Love"	Ben Haggerty, Mary Lambert and Ryan Lewis	Macklemore & Ryan Lewis featuring Mary Lambert
2015
2015	"Stay with Me" (Darkchild Version)	James Napier, William Phillips and Sam Smith	Sam Smith
2015	"All About That Bass"	Kevin Kadish and Meghan Trainor	Meghan Trainor
2015	"Chandelier"	Sia Furler and Jesse Shatkin	Sia
2015	"Shake It Off"	Max Martin, Shellback and Taylor Swift	Taylor Swift
2015	"Take Me to Church"	Andrew Hozier-Byrne	Hozier
2016
2016	"Thinking Out Loud"	Ed Sheeran and Amy Wadge	Ed Sheeran
2016	"Alright"	Kendrick Duckworth, Mark Anthony Spears and Pharrell Williams	Kendrick Lamar
2016	"Blank Space"	Max Martin, Shellback and Taylor Swift	Taylor Swift
2016	"Girl Crush"	Hillary Lindsey, Lori McKenna and Liz Rose	Little Big Town
2016	"See You Again"	Andrew Cedar, Justin Franks, Charles Puth and Cameron Thomaz	Wiz Khalifa featuring Charlie Puth
2017
2017	"Hello"	Adele Adkins and Greg Kurstin	Adele
2017	"Formation"	Khalif Brown, Asheton Hogan, Beyoncé Knowles and Michael Len Williams II	Beyoncé
2017	"I Took a Pill in Ibiza"	Mike Posner	Mike Posner
2017	"Love Yourself"	Justin Bieber, Benjamin Levin and Ed Sheeran	Justin Bieber
2017	"7 Years"	Lukas Forchammer, Stefan Forrest, Morten Pilegaard and Morten Ristorp	Lukas Graham
2018
2018	"That's What I Like"	Christopher Brody Brown, James Fauntleroy, Philip Lawrence, Bruno Mars, Ray Charles McCullough II, Jeremy Reeves, Ray Romulus and Jonathan Yip	Bruno Mars
2018	"Despacito"	Ramón Ayala Rodríguez, Justin Bieber, Jason Boyd, Erika Ender, Luis Fonsi and Marty James Garton Jr	Luis Fonsi and Daddy Yankee featuring Justin Bieber
2018	"4:44"	Shawn Carter and Dion Wilson	Jay-Z
2018	"Issues"	Benjamin Levin, Mikkel Storleer Eriksen, Tor Erik Hermansen, Julia Michaels and Justin Drew Tranter	Julia Michaels
2018	"1-800-273-8255"	Alessia Caracciolo, Sir Robert Bryson Hall II, Arjun Ivatury, Khalid Robinson and Andrew Taggart	Logic featuring Alessia Cara and Khalid
2019
2019	"This Is America"	Donald Glover, Ludwig Göransson and Jeffery Lamar Williams	Childish Gambino
2019	"All the Stars"	Kendrick Duckworth, Solána Rowe, Al Shuckburg, Mark Anthony Spears and Anthony Tiffith	Kendrick Lamar and SZA
2019	"Boo'd Up"	Larrance Dopson, Joelle James, Ella Mai and Dijon McFarlane	Ella Mai
2019	"God's Plan"	Aubrey Graham, Daveon Jackson, Brock Korsan, Ron LaTour, Matthew Samuels and Noah Shebib	Drake
2019	"In My Blood"	Teddy Geiger, Scott Harris, Shawn Mendes and Geoffrey Warburton	Shawn Mendes
2019	"The Joke"	Brandi Carlile, Dave Cobb, Phil Hanseroth and Tim Hanseroth	Brandi Carlile
2019	"The Middle"	Sarah Aarons, Jordan K. Johnson, Stefan Johnson, Marcus Lomax, Kyle Trewartha, Michael Trewartha and Anton Zaslavski	Zedd, Maren Morris and Grey
2019	"Shallow"	Lady Gaga, Mark Ronson, Anthony Rossomando and Andrew Wyatt	Lady Gaga and Bradley Cooper

=== 2020s ===
Year^{[I]}	Song	Songwriter(s)	Artist(s)
2020
2020	"Bad Guy"	Billie Eilish O'Connell and Finneas O'Connell	Billie Eilish
2020	"Always Remember Us This Way"	Natalie Hemby, Lady Gaga, Hillary Lindsey and Lori McKenna	Lady Gaga
2020	"Bring My Flowers Now"	Brandi Carlile, Phil Hanseroth, Tim Hanseroth and Tanya Tucker	Tanya Tucker
2020	"Hard Place"	Ruby Amanfu, Sam Ashworth, D. Arcelious Harris, H.E.R. and Rodney Jerkins	H.E.R.
2020	"Lover"	Taylor Swift	Taylor Swift
2020	"Norman Fucking Rockwell"	Jack Antonoff and Lana Del Rey	Lana Del Rey
2020	"Someone You Loved"	Tom Barnes, Lewis Capaldi, Pete Kelleher, Benjamin Kohn and Sam Roman	Lewis Capaldi
2020	"Truth Hurts"	Steven Cheung, Eric Frederic, Melissa Jefferson and Jesse Saint John	Lizzo
2021
2021	"I Can't Breathe"	Dernst Emile II, H.E.R. and Tiara Thomas	H.E.R.
2021	"Black Parade"	Denisia Andrews, Beyoncé, Stephen Bray, Shawn Carter, Brittany Coney, Derek James Dixie, Akil King, Kim "Kaydence" Krysiuk and Rickie "Caso" Tice	Beyoncé
2021	"The Box"	Samuel Gloade, Rodrick Moore, Adarius Moragne, Eric Sloan, Larrance Dopson and Khirye Anthony Tyler	Roddy Ricch
2021	"Cardigan"	Aaron Dessner and Taylor Swift	Taylor Swift
2021	"Circles"	Louis Bell, Adam Feeney, Kaan Gunesberk, Austin Post and Billy Walsh	Post Malone
2021	"Don't Start Now"	Caroline Ailin, Ian Kirkpatrick, Dua Lipa and Emily Warren	Dua Lipa
2021	"Everything I Wanted"	Billie Eilish O'Connell and Finneas O'Connell	Billie Eilish
2021	"If the World Was Ending"	Julia Michaels and JP Saxe	JP Saxe featuring Julia Michaels
2022
2022	"Leave the Door Open"	Brandon Anderson, Christopher Brody Brown, Dernst Emile II and Bruno Mars	Silk Sonic
2022	"Bad Habits"	Fred Gibson, Johnny McDaid and Ed Sheeran	Ed Sheeran
2022	"A Beautiful Noise"	Ruby Amanfu, Brandi Carlile, Brandy Clark, Alicia Keys, Hillary Lindsey, Lori McKenna, Linda Perry and Hailey Whitters	Alicia Keys and Brandi Carlile
2022	"Drivers License"	Daniel Nigro and Olivia Rodrigo	Olivia Rodrigo
2022	"Fight for You"	Dernst Emile II, H.E.R. and Tiara Thomas	H.E.R.
2022	"Happier Than Ever"	Billie Eilish O'Connell and Finneas O'Connell	Billie Eilish
2022	"Kiss Me More"	Rogét Chahayed, Amala Zandile Dlamini, Lukasz Gottwald, Carter Lang, Gerard A. Powell II, Solána Rowe and David Sprecher	Doja Cat featuring SZA
2022	"Montero (Call Me by Your Name)"	Denzel Baptiste, David Biral, Omer Fedi, Montero Hill and Roy Lenzo	Lil Nas X
2022	"Peaches"	Louis Bell, Justin Bieber, Giveon Dezmann Evans, Bernard Harvey, Felisha "Fury" King, Matthew Sean Leon, Luis Manuel Martinez Jr., Aaron Simmonds, Ashton Simmonds, Andrew Wotman and Keavan Yazdani	Justin Bieber featuring Daniel Caesar and Giveon
2023
2023	"Just Like That"	Bonnie Raitt	Bonnie Raitt
2023	"ABCDEFU"	Sara Davis, Gayle and Dave Pittenger	Gayle
2023	"About Damn Time"	Mellisa "Lizzo" Jefferson, Eric Frederic, Blake Slatkin and Theron Makiel Thomas	Lizzo
2023	"All Too Well (10 Minute Version) (The Short Film)"	Liz Rose and Taylor Swift	Taylor Swift
2023	"As It Was"	Tyler Johnson, Kid Harpoon and Harry Styles	Harry Styles
2023	"Bad Habit"	Matthew Castellanos, Britanny Fousheé, Diana Gordon, John Carroll Kirby and Steve Lacy	Steve Lacy
2023	"Break My Soul"	Beyoncé, Shawn Carter, Terius "The-Dream" Gesteelde-Diamant and Christopher A. Stewart	Beyoncé
2023	"Easy on Me"	Adele Adkins and Greg Kurstin	Adele
2023	"God Did"	Tarik Azzouz, E. Blackmon, Khaled Khaled, Francis LeBlanc, Shawn Carter, John Stephens, Dwayne Carter, William Roberts and Nicholas Warwar	DJ Khaled featuring Rick Ross, Lil Wayne, Jay-Z, John Legend and Fridayy
2024
2024	"What Was I Made For?"	Billie Eilish O'Connell and Finneas O'Connell	Billie Eilish
2024	"A&W"	Jack Antonoff, Lana Del Rey and Sam Dew	Lana Del Rey
2024	"Anti-Hero"	Jack Antonoff and Taylor Swift	Taylor Swift
2024	"Butterfly"	Jon Batiste and Dan Wilson	Jon Batiste
2024	"Dance the Night"	Caroline Ailin, Dua Lipa, Mark Ronson and Andrew Wyatt	Dua Lipa
2024	"Flowers"	Miley Cyrus, Gregory Aldae Hein and Michael Pollack	Miley Cyrus
2024	"Kill Bill"	Rob Bisel, Carter Lang and Solána Rowe	SZA
2024	"Vampire"	Dan Nigro and Olivia Rodrigo	Olivia Rodrigo
2025
2025	"Not Like Us"	Kendrick Lamar	Kendrick Lamar
2025	"A Bar Song (Tipsy)"	Sean Cook, Collins Obinna Chibueze and Nevin Sastry	Shaboozey
2025	"Birds of a Feather"	Billie Eilish O'Connell and Finneas O'Connell	Billie Eilish
2025	"Die with a Smile"	Dernst Emile II, James Fauntleroy, Lady Gaga, Bruno Mars and Andrew Watt	Lady Gaga and Bruno Mars
2025	"Fortnight"	Jack Antonoff, Austin Post and Taylor Swift	Taylor Swift featuring Post Malone
2025	"Good Luck, Babe!"	Kayleigh Rose Amstutz, Daniel Nigro and Justin Tranter	Chappell Roan
2025	"Please Please Please"	Amy Allen, Jack Antonoff and Sabrina Carpenter	Sabrina Carpenter
2025	"Texas Hold 'Em"	Brian Bates, Beyoncé, Elizabeth Lowell Boland, Atia Boggs, Megan Bülow, Nathan Ferraro and Raphael Saadiq	Beyoncé
2026
2026	"Wildflower"	Billie Eilish O'Connell and Finneas O'Connell	Billie Eilish
2026	"Abracadabra"	Henry Walter, Lady Gaga and Andrew Watt	Lady Gaga
2026	"Anxiety"	Jaylah Hickmon	Doechii
2026	"APT."	Amy Allen, Christopher Brody Brown, Rogét Chahayed, Henry Walter, Omer Fedi, Philip Lawrence, Bruno Mars, Chae Young Park and Theron Thomas	Rosé and Bruno Mars
2026	"DTMF"	Benito Antonio Martínez Ocasio, Scott Dittrich, Benjamin Falik, Roberto José Rosado Torres, Marco Daniel Borrero, Hugo René Sención Sanabria and Tyler Spry	Bad Bunny
2026	"Golden"	Park Hong Jun, Joong Gyu Kwak, Yu Han Lee, Hee Dong Nam, Jeong Hoon Seo, Ejae and Mark Sonnenblick	Huntrix: Ejae, Audrey Nuna and Rei Ami
2026	"Luther"	Jack Antonoff, Roshwita Larisha Bacha, Matthew Bernard, Ink, Scott Bridgeway, Sam Dew, Kendrick Lamar, Mark Anthony Spears, Solána Rowe and Kamasi Washington	Kendrick Lamar and SZA
2026	"Manchild"	Amy Allen, Jack Antonoff and Sabrina Carpenter	Sabrina Carpenter
2027	"Berghain"	Björk Gudmundsdóttir, Noah Goldstein, Jake Miller, Rosalía Vila Tobella and Dylan Wiggins	Rosalía, Björk and Yves Tumor
2027	"Choosin' Texas"	Luke Dick, Miranda Lambert, Ella Langley and Joybeth Taylor	Ella Langley
2027	"The Cure"	Daniel Nigro and Olivia Rodrigo	Olivia Rodrigo
2027	"Hate That I Made You Love Me"	Ariana Grande, Max Martin and Ilya Salmanzadeh	Ariana Grande
2027	"I Knew It, I Knew You"	Jack Antonoff and Taylor Swift	Taylor Swift
2027	"Man I Need"	Olivia Dean, Tobias Jesso Jr. and Zach Nahome	Olivia Dean
2027	"Risk It All"	Dernst Emile II, James Fauntleroy, Philip Lawrence and Bruno Mars	Bruno Mars
2027	"Where Is My Husband!"	Rachel Keen and Mike Sabath	Raye

- ^{^[I]} Each year is linked to the article about the Grammy Awards held that year.
- ^{^[II]} The performing artist is only listed but does not receive the award.

== Songwriters with multiple awards ==
Three awards

- Billie Eilish
- Finneas O'Connell

Two awards

- Adele
- Bette Midler (consecutive)
- Bono
- Brody Brown
- Adam Clayton
- D'Mile (consecutive)
- The Edge
- James Horner
- Will Jennings
- Henry Mancini
- Bruno Mars
- Johnny Mercer
- Larry Mullen Jr.

== Songwriters with multiple nominations ==
9 nominations

- Jack Antonoff
- Taylor Swift

8 nominations

- Bruno Mars

6 nominations

- Beyoncé
- Billie Eilish
- Philip Lawrence
- Paul McCartney
- Finneas O'Connell
- Lionel Richie

5 nominations

- Burt Bacharach
- Lady Gaga
- Kendrick Lamar
- John Lennon
- Max Martin

4 nominations

- Adele
- Alan Bergman
- Marilyn Bergman
- Bono
- Brody Brown
- Sammy Cahn
- Brandi Carlile
- Adam Clayton
- D'Mile
- The Edge
- Jay-Z
- Will Jennings
- Billy Joel
- Hillary Lindsey
- Larry Mullen Jr.
- Dan Nigro
- Ed Sheeran
- SZA
- Sting
- Jimmy Van Heusen

3 nominations

- Amy Allen
- Carole Bayer Sager
- Jeff Bhasker
- Justin Bieber
- Christopher Brody Brown
- Cirkut
- Hal David
- Phil Hanseroth
- Tim Hanseroth
- Don Henley
- H.E.R.
- Michael Jackson
- Alicia Keys
- Greg Kurstin
- Robert John "Mutt" Lange
- John Legend
- Ari Levine
- Henry Mancini
- Lori McKenna
- Johnny Mercer
- Tim Rice
- Olivia Rodrigo
- Liz Rose
- Paul Simon
- Sounwave
- Bruce Springsteen
- Tricky Stewart
- Jule Styne
- Diane Warren
- Paul Francis Webster
- Kanye West
- Paul Williams
- Andrew Wyatt

2 nominations

- Caroline Ailin
- Peter Allen
- Ruby Amanfu
- Johntá Austin
- Corinne Bailey Rae
- Glen Ballard
- Louis Bell
- Benny Blanco
- Leslie Bricusse
- Mariah Carey
- Sabrina Carpenter
- Rogét Chahayed
- Tracy Chapman
- Lauren Christy
- Dave Cobb
- Phil Collins
- Christopher Cross
- Lana Del Rey
- Sam Dew
- Neil Diamond
- Dr. Luke
- The-Dream
- Fred Ebb
- Graham Edwards
- Eminem
- Omer Fedi
- Dino Fekaris
- Eric Fredericks
- Barry Gibb
- Robin Gibb
- Norman Gimbel
- Howard Greenfield
- Marvin Hamlisch
- Kuk Harrell
- James Horner
- Rodney Jerkins
- Elton John
- John Kander
- Josh Kear
- R. Kelly
- Kris Kristofferson
- Carter Lang
- Avril Lavigne
- Michel Legrand
- Dua Lipa
- Lizzo
- Post Malone
- Barry Mann
- Michael McDonald
- Alan Menken
- Julia Michaels
- Anthony Newley
- Freddie Perren
- Linda Perry
- Ricky Reed
- Mark Ronson
- Nate Ruess
- Bobby Russell
- Neil Sedaka
- Shellback
- Eddie Snyder
- Stephen Sondheim
- Sounwave
- Joe South
- Scott Spock
- Tiara Thomas
- Justin Tranter
- Shania Twain
- Andrew Watt
- Jimmy Webb
- Cynthia Weil
- will.i.am
- Dan Wilson
- Stevie Wonder

== See also ==
- Grammy Award for Record of the Year
- Grammy Award for Best Country Song
- Grammy Award for Best R&B Song
- Grammy Award for Best Song Written for Visual Media
- Grammy Award for Best Rock Song
- Grammy Award for Best Rap Song
- Grammy Award for Best Gospel Song
- Grammy Award for Best Gospel Performance/Song
- Grammy Award for Best Contemporary Christian Music Song
- Grammy Award for Best Contemporary Christian Music Performance/Song
- Grammy Award for Best American Roots Song
