= That Once in a Lifetime =

Single by Demis Roussos

from the album Demis Roussos
- Released: 1978
- Label: Mercury
- Songwriters: Dino Fekaris, Freddie Perren
- Producer: Freddie Perren

Demis Roussos singles chronology
"Ainsi soit-il" (1977)	"That Once in a Lifetime" (1978)	"L.O.V.E. Got a Hold of Me" (1978)

"That Once in a Lifetime" is a song by Greek singer Demis Roussos and was also released as a single from his 1978 English-language album Demis Roussos.

== Background and writing ==
The song was written by Dino Fekaris and Freddie Perren. The recording was produced by Freddie Perren.

== Commercial performance ==
The song peaked at no. 50 on the Billboard Easy Listening chart on the week of June 3, 1978 and at no. 47 on the Billboard Hot 100 on the week of July 22, 1978.

== Track listing ==
7" single Mercury SFL-2302 (1978, Japan, etc.)

A. "That Once in a Lifetime" (3:38)
B. "I Just Don't Know What to Do With Myself" (3:04)

== Charts ==
Chart (1978)	Peak position
Canada Top Singles (RPM)	75
US Adult Contemporary (Billboard)	50
US Billboard Hot 100	47
