= We've Got Love =

Single by Peaches & Herb

from the album 2 Hot
- B-side: "Four's a Traffic Jam"
- Released: June 1979
- Recorded: 1978
- Genre: R&B; adult contemporary
- Length: 3:17
- Label: Polydor
- Songwriter(s): Dino Fekaris; Freddie Perren

Peaches & Herb singles chronology
"Reunited" (1979)	"We've Got Love" (1979)	"Roller Skatin' Mate" (1979)

"We've Got Love" is a 1978 ballad by R&B vocal duo Peaches & Herb. It was the third of three single releases from their LP, 2 Hot.

== Chart history ==
The song became a hit during the summer of 1979 in the U.S., narrowly missing the Top 40. It was also an R&B and Adult Contemporary hit. "We've Got Love" did best in the Netherlands, where it reached number 14.

Chart (1978–79)	Peak position
Canada (RPM)	85
Canada (RPM Dance)	27
Netherlands	14
New Zealand (Listener)	42
U.S. Billboard Hot 100	44
U.S. Billboard Hot Soul Singles	25
U.S. Billboard Adult Contemporary	43
U.S. Cash Box Top 100	47
