= L.O.V.E. Got a Hold of Me =

Single by Demis Roussos

from the album Demis Roussos
- Released: 1978
- Label: Mercury
- Songwriter(s): Dino Fekaris, Freddie Perren
- Producer(s): Dino Fekaris, Freddie Perren

Demis Roussos singles chronology
"That Once in a Lifetime" (1978)	"L.O.V.E. Got a Hold of Me" (1978)	"Lost in Love" (1980)

"L.O.V.E. Got a Hold of Me" is a song by Greek singer Demis Roussos from his 1978 English-language album Demis Roussos.

The song was released as a 12" maxi single in 1978.

== Background and writing ==
The song was written by Dino Fekaris and Freddie Perren. Fekaris and Perren also produced the recording.

== Commercial performance ==
The song reached no. 26 on the Billboard disco chart on the week of July 22, 1978.

== Track listing ==
12" maxi single Mercury MK-51 (1978, US)

A. "L.O.V.E. Got a Hold of Me" (10:01)
B. "I Just Live" (7:07)

== Charts ==
Chart (1978)	Peak position
US Dance Club Songs (Billboard)	26
