= I Pledge My Love =

Single by Peaches & Herb

from the album Twice the Fire
- B-side: "(I Want Us) Back Together"
- Released: January 1980
- Recorded: 1979
- Genre: R&B, Adult Contemporary
- Length: 4:11
- Label: Polydor
- Songwriters: Dino Fekaris; Freddie Perren
- Producer: Freddie Perrin

Peaches & Herb singles chronology
"Roller-Skatin' Mate" (1979)	"I Pledge My Love" (1980)	"Funtime" (1980)

"I Pledge My Love" is a ballad by R&B vocal duo Peaches & Herb from their LP, Twice the Fire. It became a hit in early 1980 in the U.S. (#19) and Canada (#23). It was also a Top 40 R&B and Adult Contemporary hit.

The song had an unusually long chart run for only just making the top-twenty, spending five months on the U.S. charts and six months on the Canadian charts. Billboard ranked it as the 80th biggest U.S. hit of 1980. "I Pledge My Love" also reached number one on the New Zealand Singles Chart for one week in May 1980.

== Chart history ==
=== Weekly charts ===
Chart (1980)	Peak position
Canada RPM Top Singles	23
New Zealand (RIANZ)	1
U.S. Billboard Hot 100	19
U.S. Billboard R&B	37
U.S. Billboard Adult Contemporary	33
U.S. Cash Box Top 100	25

=== Year-end charts ===
Chart (1980)	Rank
New Zealand	6
U.S. Billboard Hot 100	80

== Certifications ==
Region	Certification	Certified units/sales
New Zealand (RMNZ)	Gold	10,000^{*}
^{*} Sales figures based on certification alone.
