= Demis Roussos (album) =

Studio album by Demis Roussos
- Released: 1978
- Labels: Philips; Mercury (US, Japan)
- Producer: Freddie Perren

Demis Roussos chronology
| The Demis Roussos Magic (1977) | Demis Roussos (1978) | Universum (1979) |

Singles from Demis Roussos
- 1. "Life in the City" Released: 1978; 2. "That Once in a Lifetime" Released: 1978; 3. "L.O.V.E. Got a Hold of Me" Released: 1978 (US)

Demis Roussos is a studio album by Greek singer Demis Roussos, released in 1978 on Philips Records (on Mercury Records in the United States).

== Commercial performance ==
The album spent 6 weeks on the U.S. Billboard Top LPs & Tape chart (now called Billboard 200), peaking at no. 184 on the week of 8 July 1978.

== Track listing ==
Produced by Freddie Perren for Grand Slam Productions.

Side A
| No. | Title | Length |
|---|---|---|
| 1. | "Feel like I'll Never Feel This Way Again" | 3:35 |
| 2. | "Loving Arms" | 2:50 |
| 3. | "Life in the City" | 3:33 |
| 4. | "Just Don't Know What to Do with Myself" | 3:04 |
| 5. | "I Just Live" | 4:33 |

Side B
| No. | Title | Length |
|---|---|---|
| 1. | "Hey Friend" | 3:17 |
| 2. | "The Other Woman" | 3:15 |
| 3. | "This Song" | 3:13 |
| 4. | "That Once in a Lifetime" | 3:38 |
| 5. | "L.O.V.E. Got a Hold of Me" | 5:43 |

== Charts ==
| Chart (1978) | Peak position |
|---|---|
| US Billboard 200 | 184 |
