= List of Billboard number-one R&B albums of 1979 =

These are the Billboard magazine R&B albums that reached number one in 1979.

== Chart history ==
Issue date	Album	Artist
January 6	C'est Chic	Chic
January 13	C'est Chic	Chic
January 20	C'est Chic	Chic
January 27	C'est Chic	Chic
February 3	C'est Chic	Chic
February 10	C'est Chic	Chic
February 17	C'est Chic	Chic
February 24	C'est Chic	Chic
March 3	2 Hot	Peaches & Herb
March 10	2 Hot	Peaches & Herb
March 17	2 Hot	Peaches & Herb
March 24	2 Hot	Peaches & Herb
March 31	Instant Funk	Instant Funk
April 7	We Are Family	Sister Sledge
April 14	2 Hot	Peaches & Herb
April 21	2 Hot	Peaches & Herb
April 28	2 Hot	Peaches & Herb
May 5	2 Hot	Peaches & Herb
May 12	We Are Family	Sister Sledge
May 19	We Are Family	Sister Sledge
May 26	We Are Family	Sister Sledge
June 2	We Are Family	Sister Sledge
June 9	We Are Family	Sister Sledge
June 16	We Are Family	Sister Sledge
June 23	Bad Girls	Donna Summer
June 30	Bad Girls	Donna Summer
July 7	Bad Girls	Donna Summer
July 14	I Am	Earth, Wind & Fire
July 21	Teddy	Teddy Pendergrass
July 28	Teddy	Teddy Pendergrass
August 4	Teddy	Teddy Pendergrass
August 11	Teddy	Teddy Pendergrass
August 18	Teddy	Teddy Pendergrass
August 25	Teddy	Teddy Pendergrass
September 1	Teddy	Teddy Pendergrass
September 8	Teddy	Teddy Pendergrass
September 15	Midnight Magic	Commodores
September 22	Midnight Magic	Commodores
September 29	Midnight Magic	Commodores
October 6	Off the Wall	Michael Jackson
October 13	Off the Wall	Michael Jackson
October 20	Off the Wall	Michael Jackson
October 27	Ladies' Night	Kool & the Gang
November 3	Ladies' Night	Kool & the Gang
November 10	Off the Wall	Michael Jackson
November 17	Off the Wall	Michael Jackson
November 24	Off the Wall	Michael Jackson
December 1	Off the Wall	Michael Jackson
December 8	Off the Wall	Michael Jackson
December 15	Off the Wall	Michael Jackson
December 22	Masterjam	Rufus and Chaka Khan
December 29	Masterjam	Rufus and Chaka Khan

== See also ==
- 1979 in music
- R&B number-one hits of 1979 (USA)
