= Steve Topley =

Pop music manager

Steve Topley (born Stephanovich Mikhail Alexandrovich Toplitsky, December 5, 1925 – April 8, 2013) was a music manager and World War II veteran.

March 27, 1965 Billboard Magazine published in the News From the Music Capitals of the World, Hollywood section, " Steve Topley joined T.M. Music as administrator. He was formerly with lafinity Records and Garett Electronics."

November 5, 1996 Billboard Magazine published "Steve Topley, formerly with Hanna-Barbera is the new sales-promotion manager. " referring to Abnak Music which had just bought a building in Dallas, TX to start their own national record label.

March 23, 1968 Billboard Magazine published in the Executive Turntable column, "Steve Topley has joined Frank Slay's Claride Music Group as national promotion manager. In a move to enlarge his West Coast operations, Slay also assigned to Topley the additional function of new talent coordination. Topley has been national promotion manager for Hanna-Barbera."

May 3, 1969 Billboard Magazine published "Steve Topley appointed director of national promotion, Kapralik International. Topley will handle record promotion for Sly and the Family Stone, Peaches and Herb, and other acts represented by the company. Previously Topley was West Coast regional man for Epic Records. He will be based in Hollywood."

August 7, 1982 The Sound Doctor's, Tonight's Just Right song made Billboard's Top Singles in the Pop category. Topley helped produce this song.
