= 2 Hot =

2 Hot!

Studio album by Peaches & Herb
- Released: 1978
- Recorded: 1977–1978
- Studio: The Mom & Pop's Company Store, Studio City, California
- Genre: Disco; R&B; soul
- Length: 38:06
- Label: MVP; Polydor
- Producer: Freddie Perren

Peaches & Herb chronology
Peaches & Herb (1977)	2 Hot! (1978)	Twice the Fire (1979)

2 Hot! is an album by American vocalist duo Peaches & Herb. The album was issued in 1978. It was the strongest performing album by the duo on the Billboard charts, where it topped the R&B Albums chart and reached the second position on the Pop Albums chart. 2 Hot notably featured the disco hit "Shake Your Groove Thing" and the No. 1 R&B and pop ballad, "Reunited".

== Reception ==
Professional ratings
Review scores
Source	Rating
AllMusic	3/5 stars
Christgau's Record Guide	B+
The Virgin Encyclopedia of R&B and Soul	2/5 stars

The AllMusic review by Andrew Hamilton stated: "Disco jams and sweet ballads are featured on Peaches & Herb's return to the charts after a long absence... This new Peaches oozed sexuality, and her voice could raise the dead... The duo's specialty were ballads, and 'Four's a Traffic Jam' is a beauty, Fame's sweet falsetto and Greene's sexy phrasings are intoxicating."

== Track listing ==
All tracks are written by Dino Fekaris and Freddie Perren.

No.	Title	Length
1.	"We've Got Love"	3:21
2.	"Shake Your Groove Thing"	5:45
3.	"Reunited"	5:46
4.	"All Your Love (Give It Here)"	4:22
5.	"Love It Up Tonight"	4:58
6.	"Four's a Traffic Jam"	5:11
7.	"The Star of My Life"	4:08
8.	"Easy as Pie"	4:35

== Charts ==
=== Weekly charts ===
Chart (1978–1979)	Peak position
Australia Albums (Kent Music Report)	50
Dutch Albums (Album Top 100)	18
New Zealand Albums (RMNZ)	18
US Billboard 200	2
US Top R&B/Hip-Hop Albums (Billboard)	1

=== Year-end charts ===
Chart (1979)	Position
US Top R&B/Hip-Hop Albums (Billboard)	3

== Personnel ==
- Benjamin Barrett – contractor
- Mathieu Bitton – design
- David Blumberg – horn arrangements, string arrangements
- Bob "Boogie" Bowles – guitar
- Samuel F. Brown III – string arrangements, percussion
- Philip Chiang – design
- Rick Clifford – assistant engineer
- Paulinho da Costa – percussion
- Mike Doud – art direction, design
- Scott Edwards – bass (uncredited)
- Electric Ivory Experience (John Barnes and Bob Robitaille) – synthesizer, synthesizer arrangements
- Herb Fame – vocals
- Larry Farrow – keyboards
- James Gadson – drums
- Roger Glenn – flute, soloist
- Linda "Peaches" Greene – vocals
- Michele Horie – art direction, production coordination
- Pat Lawrence – executive producer
- Gavin Lurssen – mastering
- Wade Marcus – horn arrangements, string arrangements
- Jim McCrary – photography
- Freddie Perren – keyboards, producer, rhythm arrangements, vibraphone
- Steve Pouliot – engineer
- Peter Manning Robinson – horn arrangements, string arrangements, synthesizer, synthesizer arrangements
- Jack Rouben – engineer, remixing
- Jessica Ruiz – master tape research
- Lily Salinas – master tape research
- Thane Tierney – selection
- David T. Walker – guitar
- Wah Wah Watson – guitar
- Harry Weinger – reissue supervisor
- Bob Zimmitti – percussion

== See also ==
- List of number-one R&B albums of 1979 (U.S.)
