= Ainsi soit-il =

Single by Demis Roussos

from the album Ainsi soit-il
- Released: 1977
- Label: Philips
- Songwriter(s): Alec R. Costandinos, Martial Carcelès, Célestin Ganou
- Producer(s): Demis Roussos

Demis Roussos singles chronology
"Kyrila" (1977)	"Ainsi soit-il" (1977)	"That Once in a Lifetime" (1978)

Music video
- "Ainsi soit-il" (French TV, 25 Feb 1978) on YouTube

"Ainsi soit-il" is a song in French by Greek singer Demis Roussos.

The song was recorded by Roussos at Philips. It was released as a 45-RPM single with "Un cœur qui bat pour toi" on the other side (in 1977 on the label Philips Records).

The song "Ainsi soit-il" was also part of Roussos' 1977 French-language album Ainsi soit-il.

== Background and writing ==
The song was written by Martial Carcelès, Célestin Ganou, and Alec R. Costandinos. The recording was produced by Demis Roussos.

== Commercial performance ==
=== France ===
The single "Ainsi-soit-il" reached the top 10 in France (according to the chart compiled by Groupement d'Intérêt Economique de l'Edition Phonographique et Audiovisuelle, a.k.a. GIEEPA).

As of October 21, 1977, it was at no. 4 of the RTL Hit Parade.

== Track listing ==
7" single Philips 6172 048 (1977, France)

A. " Ainsi soit-il" (3:43)
B. "Un cœur qui bat pour toi" (2:46)
