= Shake Your Groove Thing =

1978 single by Peaches & Herb

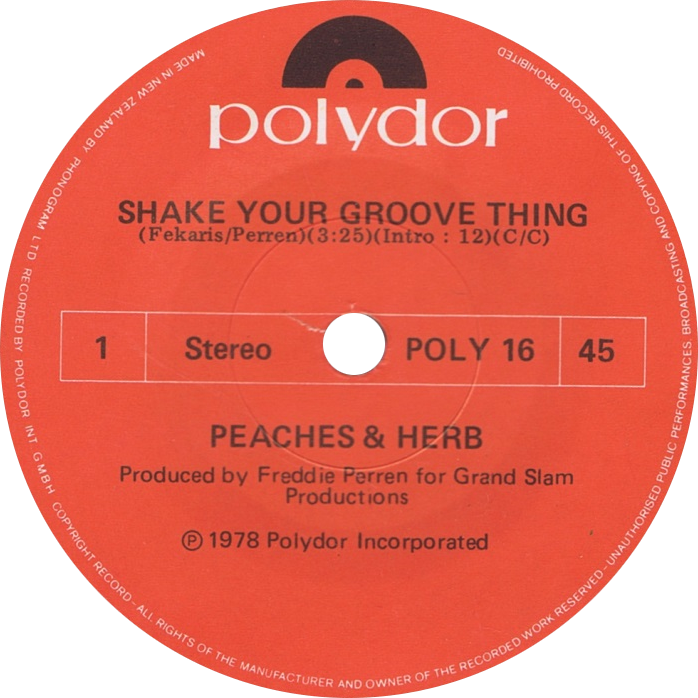
- Side A of the New Zealand single

Single by Peaches & Herb

from the album 2 Hot!
- B-side: "All Your Love (Give It Here)"
- Released: December 1978
- Genre: Disco
- Length: 5:45 (Album version); 3:25 (7" version); 6:35 (12″ version)
- Label: Polydor
- Songwriters: Dino Fekaris; Freddie Perren
- Producer: Freddie Perren

Peaches & Herb singles chronology
"We're Still Together" (1977)	"Shake Your Groove Thing" (1978)	"Reunited" (1979)

"Shake Your Groove Thing" is a Disco song from 1979 by R&B duo Peaches & Herb. The single reached No. 5 on the U.S. Billboard Hot 100 and No. 4 on the Billboard R&B chart. It also reached No. 2 for four weeks on the Billboard Disco chart in 1979. The song spent 22 weeks on the American charts and became a Gold record.

The song was Peaches & Herb's return to the charts after an absence of seven years. It was their first hit with the third "Peaches", Linda Greene.

== Chart performance ==
=== Weekly charts ===
Chart (1979)	Peak position
Australia (Kent Music Report)	13
Canada (RPM)	5
Netherlands	22
New Zealand (RIANZ)	10
UK Singles Chart	26
U.S. Billboard Hot 100	5
U.S. Billboard National Disco Action Top 40	2
U.S. Billboard Hot Soul Singles	4
U.S. Cash Box Top 100	5

Chart (1994)	Peak position
Australia (ARIA)	71
UK Singles Chart	99

=== Year-end charts ===
Chart (1979)	Rank
Australia (Kent Music Report)	99
Canada	38
U.S. Billboard Hot 100	31
U.S. Cash Box Top 100	50

== Certifications ==
Region	Certification	Certified units/sales
Canada (Music Canada)	Gold	75,000^{^}
United States (RIAA)	Gold	1,000,000^{^}
^{^} Shipments figures based on certification alone.

== Cover versions ==
- In 1996, Filipino singer Regine Velasquez covered the song for her album Retro.
- In the 2009 film Alvin and the Chipmunks: The Squeakquel, the song was sung by The Chipmunks and The Chipettes and also featured on the soundtrack album.
- The song is featured in the 2011 dance-based music video game Just Dance Kids 2, and covered by The Just Dance Kids.
- The song was used as a parody called "Shake Your Tail Now" for the Dance Star Mickey toy.

== Popular culture ==
- In 1997, Intel used this song in an advert for the Pentium II that arrives in New York.
- In 1999, Disney used this song in a trailer for An Extremely Goofy Movie.

It was heard in TV and movies like:

- The Adventures of Priscilla, Queen of the Desert
- The Drew Carey Show
- An Extremely Goofy Movie
- Friends
- The Sweetest Thing
- The Country Bears
- Monster
- Grand Theft Auto IV
- Shrek Forever After
- Night at the Museum: Secret of the Tomb
- Modern Family
- Scandal
- Mr Motivator's BLT
- The Bad Guys 2
- Grown-ish

== Other sources ==
- The Best of Peaches & Herb (liner notes).
