= An Extremely Goofy Movie =

2000 American animated film by Douglas McCarthy

- Home video release poster
- Directed by: Douglas McCarthy
- Screenplay by: Scott Gorden
- Based on: Goof Troop by: Robert Taylor; Michael Peraza Jr.
- Produced by: Lynne Southerland
- Starring: Jason Marsden; Bill Farmer; Rob Paulsen; Pauly Shore; Bebe Neuwirth; Jeff Bennett; Brad Garrett; Jim Cummings
- Music by: Steve Bartek
- Production company: Walt Disney Television Animation
- Distributed by: Buena Vista Home Entertainment (Note: Distributed under the Walt Disney Home Video imprint.)
- Release date: February 29, 2000
- Running time: 79 minutes
- Countries: United States; Singapore; Australia
- Language: English

Disney's An Extremely Goofy Movie is a 2000 direct-to-video animated sports comedy film produced by Walt Disney Television Animation, and directed by Douglas McCarthy. It is a sequel to A Goofy Movie (1995) and serves as the series finale to the television series Goof Troop (1992). An Extremely Goofy Movie was released by Buena Vista Home Entertainment on February 29, 2000. The film was re-released on Blu-ray as a Disney Movie Club exclusive alongside A Goofy Movie on April 23, 2019. The film received positive reviews from critics.

== Plot ==
After Max Goof leaves for college with his friends P.J. and Bobby Zimuruski, Goofy falters at work due to his empty nest syndrome, resulting in his dismissal. At the unemployment office, Goofy is told that he needs a college degree to get another job. Max and his friends meet Bradley Uppercrust III, the leader of the Gamma Mu Mu fraternity and a veteran skateboarder. Bradley is impressed by Max's own skateboarding talent and invites him to join the Gammas and take part in the college's X Games. Max declines the offer due to the condition that he cannot bring his friends along. Following a skirmish, the two parties place a bet in which the loser becomes the other group's towel boy. To Max's horror, Goofy begins attending the same college and interrupts the group's down-time with chores. Max plots to distract his father by introducing him to the college librarian, Sylvia Marpole, with whom he has much in common. Goofy accidentally impresses Bradley with his clumsy attempt at skateboarding and is invited to join the Gammas, which he accepts upon Max's encouragement.

During the first qualifiers for the X Games, Bradley discreetly blinds Max with a pocket mirror during his performance and installs a rocket booster on Goofy's skateboard. Goofy beats Max at his best event, and Max's team barely makes the semi-finals. Eventually, Max lashes out at Goofy, telling him to stay out of his life and storms off in anger. A depressed Goofy fails his first midterm exam and misses a date with Sylvia. Returning home, Goofy is motivated by his neighbor Pete to regain his focus. Meanwhile, Max considers transferring to another campus due to his conflict with Goofy but decides to stay with the encouragement of his friends. Goofy goes back to college and reconciles with Sylvia, who helps him ace the rest of his exams. As Goofy quits the Gammas, he overhears the group plotting to cheat for the semi-finals, but Max, still angry with his father over beating him in the qualifiers, refuses to listen.

At the semi-finals, all teams but Max's and the Gammas' are eliminated. Just before the final triathlon, Bradley eliminates P.J. from the games, leaving Max's team short one player and spurring Max to recruit and apologize to Goofy via the jumbotron. Throughout the race, Bradley and his team attempt to hinder Max's team, but only manage to eliminate Bobby. Although Goofy manages to knock out Bradley with a horseshoe in the final section of the race, his final trick results in Max and Gamma member Tank getting trapped underneath the wreckage of a logo. As Bradley passes them by, Max and Goofy rescue Tank, who assists Max in winning the race. Afterwards, Bradley concedes his defeat. Max calls off the bet, but allows a vengeful Tank to advance on Bradley for betraying him and fling him into the X Games blimp overhead. During graduation day, Max gives Goofy his grand-prize trophy engraved with an affirmation of their bond, and Goofy drives away with Sylvia for their next date.

== Voice cast ==
- Jason Marsden as Max Goof, Goofy's son, who desires a normal college life independent of his father. Bob Baxter and Steven Trenbirth served as the supervising animators for Max.
  - Dana Hill (via archive) as young Max during one of Goofy's visions.
- Bill Farmer as Goofy, Max's well-meaning but accident-prone father and a one-time college dropout, who attends the same college Max does to cope with empty nest syndrome and to finish earning his degree so he can find employment again. Andrew Collins served as the supervising animator for Goofy.
- Jeff Bennett as Bradley Uppercrust III, the arrogant leader of the Gamma Mu Mu fraternity. Kevin Peaty served as the supervising animator for Brad.
  - Bennett also voices the Unemployment Lady and Chuck the Sportscaster, in addition to his uncredited roles as Ken Clark, a diminutive member of the Gammas, and an X-Games referee.
- Jim Cummings as Pete, P.J.'s father and Goofy's misanthropic next-door neighbor, who, unlike Goofy, has little emotional attachment to his son and is happy to see him leave for college, having planned to convert his bedroom into a bowling alley.
  - Cummings also has uncredited roles as Goofy's supervisor at his toy factory job, a member of the Gammas who wears sunglasses, and both a professor and a tour guide at the college.
- Brad Garrett as Tank, the immensely strong second-in-command of the Gammas.
- Vicki Lewis as the Beret Girl, a charismatic beatnik and suave stage performer in the college café called the "Bean Scene", who becomes P.J.'s love interest when the latter shows innate talent in poetry. Kevin Peaty served as the supervising animator for the Beret Girl.
- Bebe Neuwirth as Sylvia Marpole, the college librarian who immediately becomes Goofy's love interest when she is shown to share Goofy's love for American culture from the 1970s, when Goofy previously attended college. Andrew Collins served as the supervising animator for Sylvia.
- Rob Paulsen as P.J., Pete's timid son and Max's best friend since childhood. Bob Baxter and Steven Trenbirth served as the supervising animators for P.J.
  - Paulsen also voices a member of the Gammas with black hair and a large snout (uncredited), and an attendant at the X-Games semifinals (uncredited).
- Pauly Shore as Robert "Bobby" Zimuruski, Max's other best friend. Bob Baxter and Steven Trenbirth served as the supervising animators for Bobby. Unlike the first film, Shore receives credit for his work.

== Soundtrack ==
Unlike its predecessor, the film has no musical sequences where the characters sing on-screen. However, a number of songs are used in the soundtrack and have been included in the official album release which is titled Disney's An Extremely Goofy Movie Dance Party!, released in February 2000 alongside the film itself.

1. "Future's So Bright I Gotta Wear Shades" – Pat Benatar and Neil Giraldo
2. "Don't Give Up" – John Avila, Terrence A. Carson, Carmen Carter and Carl Graves
3. "Nowhere to Run" – John Avila
4. "Pressure Drop" – The Specials
5. "Shake Your Groove Thing" – Peaches & Herb
6. "You Make Me Feel Like Dancing" – Carmen Carter and Donnie McClurkin
7. ESPN X Games Theme 1 and Theme 2
8. "C'mon Get Happy!" – The Partridge Family
9. "Knock on Wood" – Carmen Carter
10. ESPN X Games Theme 3
11. "Right Back Where We Started From" – Cleopatra

== Release and reception ==
The film was released on February 29, 2000, to positive reviews from critics, who called it "likable," "fun," "funny," "ambitious and surprisingly good," and Goofy's character in the film "limber and funny as ever." On the review aggregator Rotten Tomatoes, the film holds a 63% approval rating based on eight reviews, with an average rating of 5.4/10. The Houston Chronicle's Bruce Westbrook praised its "fluid" animation, "handsomely detailed" backgrounds, and the "charming" sequences with the Beret Girl. Randy Myers of the Contra Costa Times complimented its positive take on the father-and-son relationship trope as "refreshing" compared to other films painting it in a negative manner. Many touches were positively noted, such as the elements of 1970s' culture, the soundtrack (particularly its 1970s tracks and the newly-recorded covers), movie parodies (such as The Gooffather, The Goofinator and Pup Fiction Too), and a line making fun of characters "always wearing gloves" in the Disney universe. Subplots such the skateboard competition and the "sweet" relationship between Goofy and Sylvia were highlighted as well.

An Extremely Goofy Movie's less favorable reviews categorized the film as a weaker version of Rodney Dangerfield's Back to School. and the Los Angeles Times' Susan King who wrote that despite "some funny lines and scenes," it had too little emotionally due to a lack of character development for Goofy. Michael Scheinfeld of Common Sense Media praised the film's morals of "the importance of education, of not cheating, and staying focused on one's goals," but disliked its attempts to be hip and the "less-than-exemplary character traits" that paint an inaccurate picture of college students. Barbara Bova of Naples Daily News also dismissed the film for the immature behavior of the college students as well as the dysfunctional relationship between Max and Goofy and a "depressing," humorless plot where "the adults are no smarter than the kids" and "Goofy is the essential innocent who is stupid with a capital S." Scheinfeld also called the animation "less sophisticated than Disney's theatrical films, but features some amusing and stylish touches, such as a psychedelic dream sequence in the style of Yellow Submarine, and a school dance that Goofy turns into a disco inferno."

Petrana Radulovic of Polygon, in 2019, ranked An Extremely Goofy Movie the sixth best Disney sequel, labeling it as "all delightfully bonkers" and claiming its best aspects to be the Beret Girl and Bobby's poke on Disney characters wearing gloves; she also, however, criticized some of its content as "stuck in a gnarly late-’90s vortex."

Consumers could receive a $4 mail-in rebate after purchasing the video and three Parkay products, while select Parkay packages contained An Extremely Goofy Movie trading cards.

An Extremely Goofy Movie won the award for "Best Animated Home Video Production" and Bill Farmer was nominated for "Best Voice Acting by a Male Performer" at the 28th Annie Awards in 2000.
