= Meritxell Negre =

Spanish singer (1971–2020)

- Born: 17 February 1971; Barcelona, Spain
- Died: 21 January 2020 (aged 48) Barcelona, Spain
- Genres: R&B, neo soul, Latin, pop, jazz, funk
- Years active: 2008–2010
- Labels: Columbia Records, Imagen Records, Meritxell Music
- Website: latinqueenofsoul.com

Meritxell Negre (17 February 1971 – 21 January 2020) was a Spanish singer-songwriter who was the sixth "Peaches" of international R&B/pop duo Peaches and Herb. Negre was born in Barcelona, Spain. She was the lead singer in Barcelona's The Sutton Club Orchestra and was a runner up in the hit TV talent show El Trampolin (Telecinco), Spain's equivalent of Star Search.

In 1996 Negre signed a publishing and production contract with EMI Publishing, Inc. She recorded her first solo album in 2004, The Meritxell Project/El Proyecto Meritxell. The album, which holds the same title as Negre's band, was co-written and produced with popular bassist/producer Gary Grainger. The album incorporates a bilingual mixture of R&B, Latin grooves and Jazzy ballads.

== Fame ==
In 2008 Negre was heard doing session work by Fame, who was looking for the next singer to collaborate with as "Peaches." She officially became the first-ever non-African American Peaches and third recording artist since 1983 to co-record with Fame a Peaches and Herb album. The duo's latest album, Colors Of Love (Imagen Records), features Negre's powerful alto-soprano voice and range.

== Philanthropy ==
Negre did her share of philanthropic work. She performed for the New Mexico Barack Obama Inaugural Party and as musical entertainer and spokesperson for the Pennington Empowerment Foundation I LOVE YOU, ME! Women's Empowerment Conference. She also sang the theme song and made public service announcements for the elderly for non-profit newspaper, Street Sense.

== Later career ==
On 13 February 2010 Negre parted from Peaches and Herb after KLUC's fourth Annual Valentine's Love Affair at the Orleans Arena, Las Vegas. At the concert the duo performed various hits, including "Reunited," “Shake Your Groove Thing," and "I Pledge My Love." Post Peaches & Herb, Negre relocated from Washington D.C. to Los Angeles to concentrate on various music projects. She continued doing sessions, movie soundtracks, and wrote and recorded the commercial jingle for national debt relief company, DebtFreeLeague.com. She also toured independently as the "Latin Queen Of Soul" and managed her own variety band, Rhythm Rapture Band.

In 2010 Negre founded Silly Dog Entertainment. The live music and entertainment agency books variety bands, musicians, and specialty acts for corporate events, weddings, and private parties.

== Death ==
On 21 January 2020, her record label Gestmusic Endemol announced that Negre died after a long battle with cancer.
