= Reunited (song) =

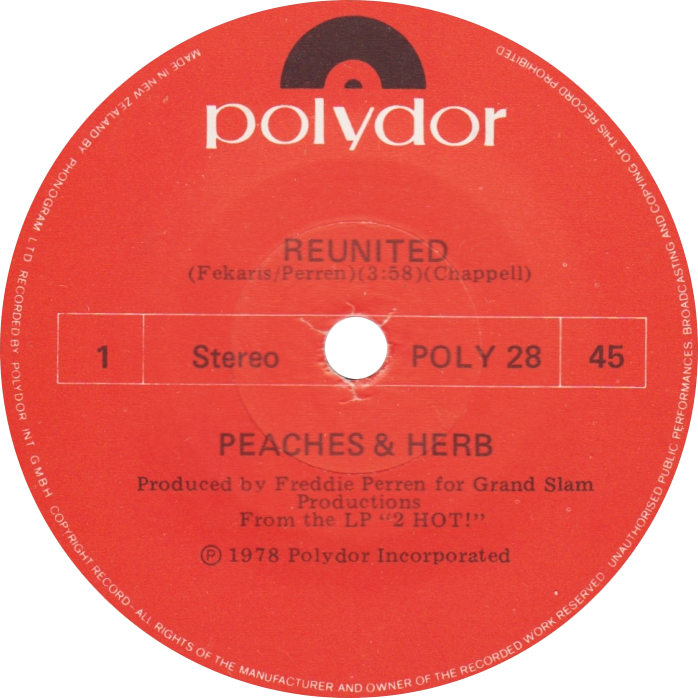
- Side A of the New Zealand single

Single by Peaches & Herb

from the album 2 Hot
- B-side: "Easy as Pie"
- Released: March 1979
- Recorded: 1978
- Genre: R&B; soft rock; disco; smooth soul
- Length: 5:46 (Album Version); 3:58 (Single Version)
- Label: Polydor
- Songwriters: Dino Fekaris; Freddie Perren
- Producer: Freddie Perren

Peaches & Herb singles chronology
"Shake Your Groove Thing" (1978)	"Reunited" (1979)	"We've Got Love" (1979)

"Reunited" is a hit ballad for R&B vocal duo Peaches & Herb. As the second single release from their album, 2 Hot (1978), the song was a huge crossover smash, topping both the pop and soul charts. It spent four weeks at number one on both the R&B singles chart and the Billboard Hot 100 singles chart in 1979 and sold over two million copies. Billboard ranked it as the No. 5 song for 1979. In Canada, "Reunited" likewise reached number one and was the No. 9 song for the year.

The song was written by Dino Fekaris and Freddie Perren. It was the sequel to the duo's 1968 hit "(We'll Be) United", performed with the original Peaches, which was itself a cover of The Intruders' original 1966 hit.

== Charts ==
=== Weekly charts ===
Chart (1979)	Peak position
Australia (Kent Music Report)	8
Canada (RPM Top Singles)	1
Canada (RPM Adult Contemporary)	1
Ireland (IRMA)	3
Netherlands	2
New Zealand (RIANZ)	2
Spain (AFE)	1
UK	4
US Billboard Hot 100	1
US Adult Contemporary (Billboard)	4
US Hot R&B/Hip-Hop Songs (Billboard)	1
US Cash Box Top 100	1

=== Year-end charts ===
Chart (1979)	Rank
Australia (Kent Music Report)	58
Canada	9
New Zealand	18
UK	27
US Billboard Hot 100	5
US Cash Box Top 100	9

=== All-time charts ===
Chart (1979–2018)	Position
US Billboard Hot 100	304

== Sales and certifications ==
Region	Certification	Certified units/sales
Canada (Music Canada)	Platinum	150,000^{^}
United Kingdom (BPI)	Silver	250,000^{^}
United States (RIAA)	Platinum	2,000,000^{^}
^{^} Shipments figures based on certification alone.

== Cover versions ==
- A version by Louise Mandrell and R. C. Bannon reached #13 on the Hot Country Singles chart in 1979.
- It was regularly covered by Faith No More as the intro song to the live shows on their 2009/2010 reunion tour.
- It was sung by David Hasselhoff at the fall of the Berlin Wall in 1989.
- Lulu recorded a version with Cliff Richard for her album Together (2002). It also appeared on Cliff's 2006 album Two's Company: The Duets.
- Raven-Symoné and Bobb'e J. Thompson sang "Reunited" in the season 3 episode of That's So Raven, "The Grill Next Door" (2005).

== Sampled versions ==
- South Korean rapper Cho PD sampled in "First Love" (첫사랑) from the album Money Talks (2007).

== Uses in popular culture ==
- It appears in the TV series Son of the Beach, Haven, Grounded for Life, King of the Hill, Raising Hope, Brooklyn Nine-Nine, That '70s Show and was also used as the theme for the BBC TV series Stars Reunited between 2003 and 2004. It also featured in an episode of The Fresh Prince.
- It also appears in the comedy movie Dudley Do-Right (1999).
- The song featured in the comedy movie Stealing Harvard (2002) for the scenes where the lonely widower judge forces some unsuspecting man to wear his late wife's dress and spoon with him.
- The song appeared on the September 16, 2019 episode of ESPN's Monday Night Countdown about Odell Beckham Jr.'s return to MetLife Stadium as a member of the Cleveland Browns.
- It appears in episode 7 of season 1 of the BBC time travel procedural television series Ashes to Ashes, originally broadcast on March 20, 2008.
- It is featured as the song for a spring 2021 Saint Louis Zoo commercial, welcoming guests back to the zoo after winter during the COVID-19 pandemic.
- Radio requests and records sales spiked during the reunification of Germany in Germany and elsewhere in Western Europe.
