= Miriamm Wright =

American singer and songwriter (born 1971)

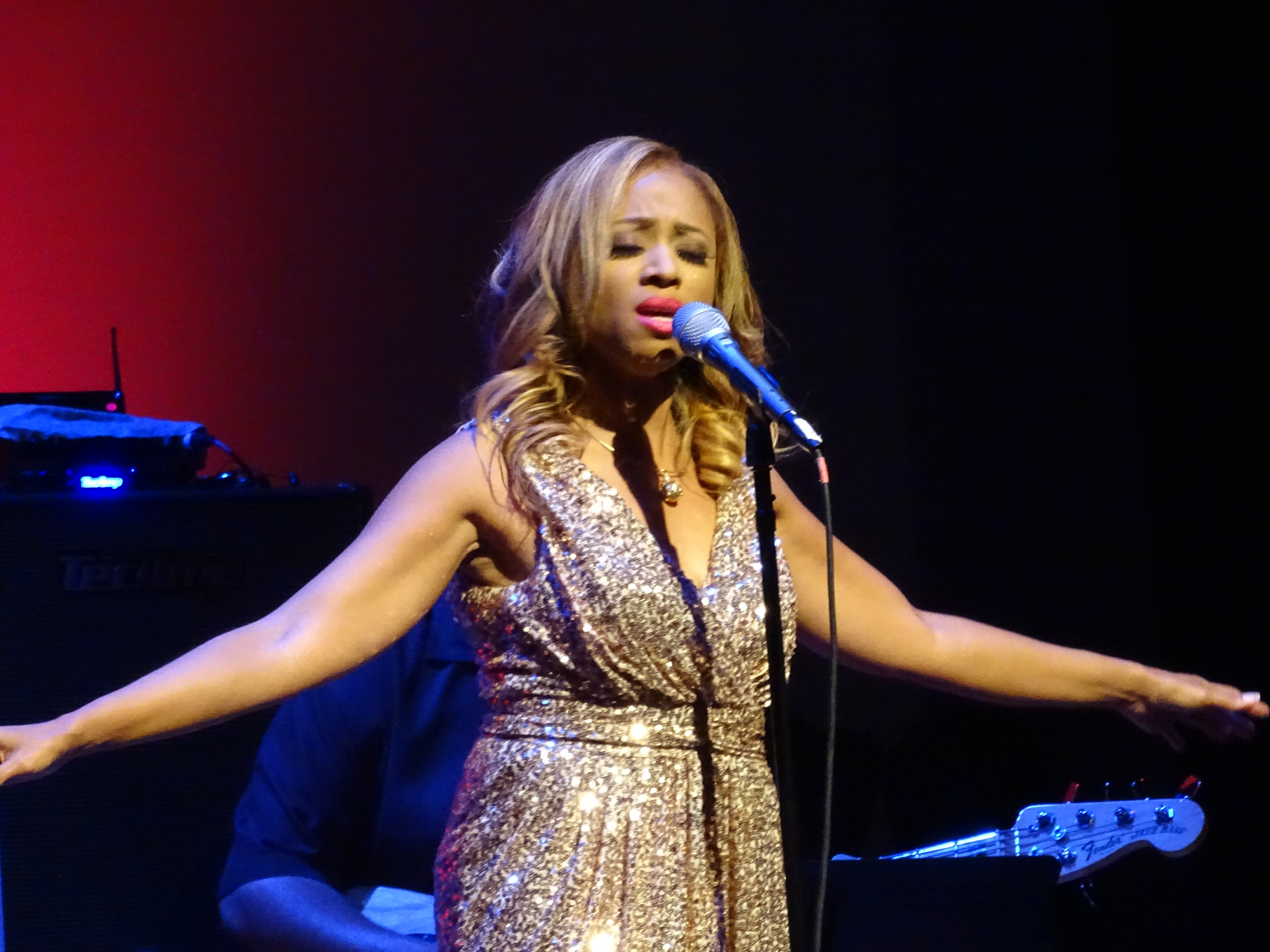
- Miriamm performing at Bethesda Blues and Jazz in 2017

Background information
- Born: Miriamm Ebony Wright; September 23, 1971 (age 54); Pittsburgh, Pennsylvania, United States
- Origin: Washington, D.C., United States
- Genres: R&B; soul
- Occupations: Singer, songwriter, actress
- Instrument: Vocals
- Years active: 2002–present
- Labels: JasMar Entertainment, LLC (WorldWide), JasMar Entertainment
- Website: miriamm.com

Miriamm Wright is an American singer and songwriter.

== Early life ==
At age 10, Wright lost her mother to breast cancer. She entered talent shows during high school and discovered her love of old school music. She went on to write, produce and star in a play called Sound the Alarm, which was created for the purpose of dispelling myths surrounding breast cancer.

== Career ==
=== 2007: Kennedy Center ===
Wright headlined a concert at The Kennedy Center for the Performing Arts in performance in "A Concert of Love: Conquering, Claiming, and Celebrating Your Victory," honoring breast cancer survivors.

=== 2008–2010: Tours ===
Wright opened for acts such as India.Arie, Jill Scott and Boyz II Men. Her debut video, "Road of Peace" aired on BET JAZZ and BET Gospel.

=== 2014 – Present : Bethesda Blues ===
In 2014, Wright began performing at a benefit concert called "Miriamm turns Bethesda Blues & Jazz Pink" in honor of Breast Cancer Awareness Month with the annual EPW Awards! EPW Awards honors breast cancer survivors, their caregivers, doctors, and members of the community who are working in the fight against breast cancer.

== Discography ==
- 2004: Miriamm! Live at Blues Alley
- 2008: Road of Peace
- 2010: My Favorite Things

== Filmography ==
Wright portrayed the late Mahalia Jackson in the stage play Sing Mahalia Sing and appeared in Cadillac Records (Sony Music Films), portraying a background singer for Etta James (Beyoncé Knowles).

== Philanthropy ==
Wright founded and serves as Chair of the Board for the non-profit organization the Edith P. Wright Breast Cancer Foundation, Inc. (EPW), raising money to provide support services to families facing breast cancer, as well as to provide education and screening to under-served communities. Wright has headlined at the John F. Kennedy Center for the Performing Arts, Bethesda Blues and Jazz Supper Club and Blues Alley in concerts designed to raise funding and awareness to the disease of breast cancer. Wright wrote a song for Breast Cancer Awareness entitled, "We Must Find A Cure" with proceeds supporting the fight against breast cancer.
