= Dino Fekaris =

American music producer and songwriter

- Born: Dino George Fekaris; January 24, 1945 (age 81); Pittsburgh, Pennsylvania, U.S.
- Education: Wayne State University
- Known for: "I Will Survive"

Dino George Fekaris (born January 24, 1945) is an American music producer and songwriter.

Fekaris was the producer and co-writer, with Freddie Perren, of the 1978 song "I Will Survive", and other songs recorded by Gloria Gaynor. Nominated five times for the Grammy Award, he won once in 1979 for "I Will Survive".

== Biography ==
Dino attended Wayne State University in Detroit, Michigan, and was a member of Delta Chi Fraternity.

He joined Motown at the tail end of the 1960s as a producer and writer, initially linking with Nick Zesses and working with the likes of The Naturals. Their first major success came with Rare Earth, for whom they penned "I Just Want to Celebrate" and "Hey Big Brother", with Zesses and Fekaris also linking up with fellow writer and producer Tom Baird in the band Matrix. The trio also wrote together, penning "Love Me" for Diana Ross, a No. 38 UK hit in 1974.

Fekaris was fired by Motown in the mid-70s, and he teamed up with Perren to write "I Will Survive", later recorded by Gloria Gaynor. Fekaris and Perren also wrote a number of songs together, including "Shake Your Groove Thing", "I Pledge My Love" and "Reunited" by Peaches & Herb, "She Don't Let Nobody (But Me)" by Curtis Mayfield, and "Makin' It" by David Naughton and co-writer of the Rare Earth hit "I Just Want to Celebrate".
