= Peaches & Herb =

American vocal duo

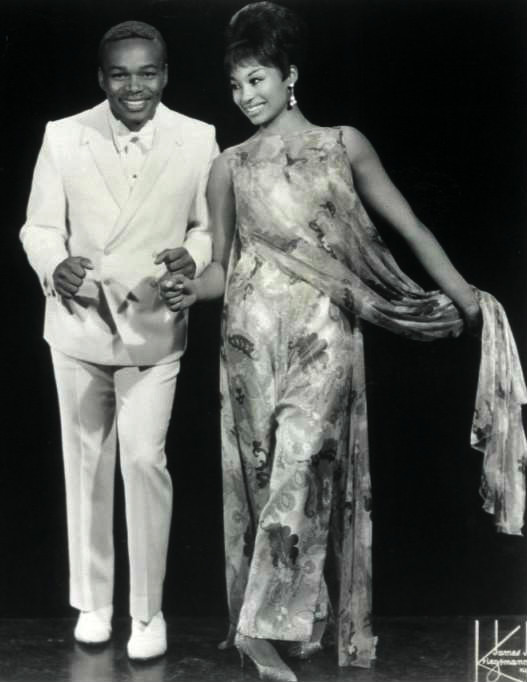
- Peaches and Herb in 1968

Background information
- Origin: Washington, D.C., U.S.
- Genres: Disco; funk; R&B; soul
- Years active: 1966–1970; 1976–1986; 1990–present
- Labels: Date; Columbia Records; Imagen; Polydor
- Members: Wanda Makle; Herb Fame
- Past members: Francine "Peaches" Hurd Barker †; Marlene Mack; Linda Greene; Patrice Hawthorne; Gabrielle Goyette; Miriamm Wright; Meritxell Negre †

Peaches & Herb is an American vocal duo. Herb Fame (born October 1, 1941) has remained a constant as "Herb" since the duo was created in 1966; seven different women have filled the role of "Peaches", most notably Francine Edna "Peaches" Hurd Barker (April 28, 1947 – August 13, 2005), the original "Peaches" who lent her nickname to the duo, and Linda Greene Tavani, the third "Peaches", who appeared on the duo's biggest hits "Shake Your Groove Thing" (1978) and "Reunited" (1979).

== History ==
=== With Francine "Peaches" Barker and Marlene Mack (1966–1970) ===
Herb Fame (born Herbert Feemster, October 1, 1941, in Anacostia, Washington, D.C.) sang in church and neighborhood groups as a child. After graduation from high school, he worked in a local record store, where he met record producer Van McCoy and was signed to Columbia subsidiary Date Records by McCoy and A&R executive Dave Kapralik. Francine "Peaches" Barker (April 28, 1947 – August 13, 2005), using the stage name Francine Day, started a singing trio initially dubbed The Darlettes and later renamed The Sweet Things after a change of record label to Date Records. Having produced two releases for the trio, McCoy decided to record Feemster/Fame and Hurd/Day together at Kapralik's suggestion. The resulting single, "We're in This Thing Together," was distributed to radio stations but went nowhere for months until December 1966, when a St. Louis disc jockey broadcast the single's B-side, a revival of the 1934 hit "Let's Fall in Love".

The new duo, christened "Peaches & Herb", had a string of successful singles and albums over the next year such as "Close Your Eyes", "For Your Love", "Let's Fall in Love", and "Love Is Strange". Despite burgeoning success and a media image as the "Sweethearts of Soul", Barker chose to semi-retire from the duo after two years because of the rigors of touring. Marlene Mack (aka Marlene Jenkins), who had sung on the Jaynetts' hit "Sally Go 'Round the Roses" and had recorded as Marlina Mars, replaced Barker on stage, but Barker remained on all of the duo's recordings for Date Records. During this period, the semi-retired "Peaches" also worked as a solo artist using her married name, Francine Barker. She released three singles in total on the Columbia Records label, including "Angels in the Sky" and "Mister DJ".

Fame retired the act in 1970 when he enrolled in the police academy of Washington, D.C., and thereafter joined the city's police department.

=== With Linda Greene (1976–1983) ===
Peaches & Herb lay dormant until Fame decided to re-enter the music business in 1976. In his search for a new "Peaches", Herb again enlisted the assistance of Van McCoy, who suggested that Linda Greene would be suitable for the position. Fame met Greene and concurred, thereby leading to formation of the most successful of the "Peaches & Herb" incarnations to date. Linda's early musical training (while growing up in Washington, D.C.) was at The Sewell Music Conservatory.

Fame and Greene recorded seven albums altogether, including one album released only in Argentina. Their first album, Peaches & Herb, was recorded for MCA Records and produced by Van McCoy, but it generated only one charted hit, "We're Still Together". Peaches & Herb signed with MVP/Polydor and under the management of Paul J. Cohn, released 2 Hot, which went gold. The album's first single, "Shake Your Groove Thing", went gold and peaked at No. 5 on the Billboard Hot 100 in March 1979. The follow-up single, viewed as the album's "secret weapon" by producer/songwriter Freddie Perren, was the triple platinum hit "Reunited". This song, evoking the 1960s Peaches & Herb hit "United" (originally recorded and made a hit by The Intruders), reached number one on both the Hot 100 and the Billboard R&B chart, and in Canada. "Reunited" was nominated for a Grammy Award for Song of the Year in 1980. Subsequent releases with Polydor produced several more hits, including the lasting wedding staple, "I Pledge My Love". After changing labels again to the Entertainment Company, Fame and Greene released their seventh album in 1983. Scoring only one minor hit, Greene and Fame decided to make no more albums and retired their partnership. Once again, Fame returned to law enforcement and joined the U.S. Marshals Service in 1986 as a deputized court security officer at the U.S. Court of Appeals for Veterans Claims. Greene returned to her family and, together with her husband Stephen Tavani, went on to release three gospel albums and start the charity WOW (Winning Our World). Formerly Greene, Linda now goes by Linda 'Peaches' Tavani.

=== Later years ===
While remaining employed at the court, Fame again revived the brand in 1990. For the fourth "Peaches" he chose Patrice Hawthorne, fresh from television exposure on the Natalie Cole-hosted talent show Big Break. The duo appeared infrequently in concerts and did not release any recordings.

Due to unpaid royalties, Fame's financial state was far from wealthy despite years of hits and selling nine million records with Greene. Thus, in 2001, Fame and Greene hired attorneys Oren Warshavsky and Steven Ames Brown through Artists Rights Enforcement Corporation. The attorneys brought a lawsuit against MVP Records, then headed by Christine Perren. Perren's testimony at trial revealed a series of contradictions in MVP's defense, with the result that Fame and Greene received royalties, income, and a reaffirmation of their artists' rights. Those rights have since been vigorously defended.

Having financial security, Fame would then have been able to leave the court and focus solely on his music career. Instead, he banked significant funds and continued enjoying the work.

A fifth "Peaches"—singer, songwriter, and advocate for breast cancer prevention, Miriamm—joined the duo in 2002. Miriamm began touring with Herb and was introduced to the world as the new "Peaches" when she joined Herb in the PBS-televised "Rhythm, Love & Soul" fundraising drive. They shared the stage with people such as Aretha Franklin, Gloria Gaynor and Lou Rawls, among others. Their performance re-introduced Peaches and Herb and their on-stage chemistry was so well received, it sparked another invitation to the duo for the follow-up star-studded installment of the PBS show featuring R&B greats such as Irene Cara, Heatwave, and Anita Ward. Miriamm currently performs as a freelance vocalist and has founded a breast cancer foundation, EPW Breast Cancer Foundation, Inc., in honor of her mother, Edith P. Wright, providing support to families facing breast cancer.

Wanda Makle subsequently performed with Fame in weekend appearances, and in 2008 they were reported to be planning a recording together. Those plans dissolved, and instead Makle was ultimately dropped in favor of another "Peaches," Meritxell Negre from Barcelona, Spain.

Negre, who was introduced to Fame by producer Bill Davis, is the first-ever non-black "Peaches" and third recording artist to co-record a Peaches and Herb album. Together, Fame and Negre recorded Colors of Love, the first album from Peaches & Herb since 1983. Colors of Love was released in May 2009 by Imagen Records, approximately three months after Negre's stage debut as "Peaches". Negre died in 2020 after battling cancer.

Fame has since returned to touring with Wanda Makle Tolson.

== Discography ==
=== Studio albums ===
Year	Title	Details	US Billboard 200	Peaches:
1967	Let's Fall in Love	Label Date; Format- LP; Country of Release- United States	30	Francine Barker
1967	For Your Love	Label Date; Format- LP; Country of Release- United States	135	Francine Barker
1977	Peaches & Herb	Label- MCA; Format- LP; Country of Release- United States	—	Linda Greene
1978	2 Hot	Label- MVP / Polydor; Format- LP, CD; Country of Release- United States	2	Linda Greene
1979	Twice the Fire	Label- MVP / Polydor; Format- LP; Country of Release- United States	31	Linda Greene
1979	Demasiado Candente	Label- MVP / Polydor; Format- LP; Country of Release- Argentina	—	Linda Greene
1980	Worth the Wait	Label- MVP / Polydor; Format- LP, CD; Country of Release- United States	120	Linda Greene
1981	Sayin' Something	Label- MVP / Polydor; Format- LP; Country of Release- United States	168	Linda Greene
1983	Remember	Label- The Entertainment Co. / Columbia; Format- LP, CD; Country of Release- United States	204	Linda Greene
2009	Colors of Love	Label- Imagen; Format- CD; Country of Release- United States	—	Meritxell Negre
"—" denotes releases that did not chart or were not released in that territory.

=== Compilation albums ===
Year	Title	Details	US Billboard 200	Peaches:
1968	Greatest Hits	Label- Date; Country of Release- United States	187	Francine Barker
1979	Greatest Hits	Label- Epic; Country of Release- United States	—	Francine Barker
1994	Sweathearts of Soul	Label- Original Sound Entertainment; Country of Release- United States	—	Francine Barker
1995	Reunited: At Their Best	Label - PSM; Country of Release- United States	—	Linda Greene
1996	Best of Peaches & Herb	Label- MVP / Polydor; Country of Release- United States	—	Linda Greene
2001	Reunited	Label- Rotation / MVP / Polydor; Country of Release- EU	—	Linda Greene
2002	20th Century Masters	label- MVP / Polydor; Country of Release- United States	—	Linda Greene
2005	Two of a Kind	Label - Collectables; Country of Release- United States	—	Francine Barker
2005	Old School Cruzin' with Peaches & Herb	Label- Thump; Country of Release- United States	—	Francine Barker
2007	The Best of Peaches & Herb: Love Is Strange	Label- Epic / Legacy; Country of Release- United States	—	Francine Barker
2009	Greatest Hits	Label- Wounded Bird; Country of Release- United States	—	Francine Barker
2009	Golden Duets	Label- Wounded Bird; Country of Release- United States	—	Francine Barker
"—" denotes releases that did not chart or were not released in that territory.

=== 7" singles and promos ===
Year	Title	Peak chart positions						Certifications	Peaches:
Year	Title	US Hot 100	US R&B	AUS	UK	NLD	NZ	Certifications	Peaches:
1967	"Close Your Eyes" b/w "I Will Watch Over You"	8	4	—	—	—	—		Francine Barker
1967	"For Your Love" b/w "I Need Your Love So Desperately"	20	10	—	—	—	—		Francine Barker
1967	"Two Little Kids" b/w "We've Got to Love One Another"	31	25	—	—	—	—		Francine Barker
1967	"Let's Fall in Love" b/w "We're in This Thing Together"	21	11	—	—	—	—		Francine Barker
1967	"Love Is Strange" b/w "It's True I Love You"	13	16	—	—	—	—		Francine Barker
1968	"United" b/w "Thank You"	46	11	—	—	—	—		Francine Barker
1968	"Let's Make a Promise" b/w "Me & You"	75	34	—	—	—	—		Francine Barker
1968	"The Ten Commandments of Love" b/w "What a Lovely Way (To Say Goodnight)"	55	25	—	—	—	—		Francine Barker
1969	"Let Me Be the One" b/w "I Need Your Love So Desperately"	74	40	—	—	—	—		Francine Barker
1969	"When He Touches Me (Nothing Else Matters)"	49	10	—	—	—	—		Francine Barker
1969	"Darling How Long" b/w "Cupid"	—	—	—	—	—	—		Francine Barker
1970	"The Sound of Silence"	100	—	—	—	—	—		Francine Barker
1970	"It's Just a Game, Love" b/w "Satisfy My Hunger"	110	50	—	—	—	—		Francine Barker
1971	"God Save This World"	—	—	—	—	—	—		Francine Barker
1977	"I'm Counting on You"	—	—	—	—	—	—		Linda Greene
1977	"We're Still Together"	107	98	—	—	—	—		Linda Greene
1978	"Shake Your Groove Thing"	5	4	13	26	22	10		Linda Greene
1979	"Reunited" b/w "Easy as Pie"	1	1	8	4	2	2	BPI: Silver	Linda Greene
1979	"Reunited" b/w "We've Got Love"	—	—	—	—	—	—		Linda Greene
1979	"We've Got Love" b/w "Four's a Traffic Jam"	44	25	—	—	14	42		Linda Greene
1979	"Roller Skatin' Mate"	66	30	—	—	—	—		Linda Greene
1979	"I Pledge My Love" b/w "(I Want Us) Back Together"	19	37	73	—	—	1		Linda Greene
1979	"Howzabout Some Love" b/w "Put It There"	—	—	—	—	—	—		Linda Greene
1979	"Sacude Tu Alegria" b/w "Todo Tu Amor"	—	—	—	—	—	—		Linda Greene
1980	"Funtime"	—	37	—	—	—	—		Linda Greene
1980	"All Night Celebration"	—	—	—	—	—	—		Linda Greene
1980	"One Child of Love" b/w "Hearsay"	—	51	—	—	—	—		Linda Greene
1981	"Freeway" b/w "Picking Up the Pieces"	—	37	—	—	—	—		Linda Greene
1981	"Bluer Than Blue" b/w "Go with the Flow"	—	45	—	—	—	—		Linda Greene
1983	"Remember"	—	35	—	—	—	—		Linda Greene
1983	"In My World" b/w "Keep On Smiling"	—	—	—	—	—	—		Linda Greene
"—" denotes releases that did not chart or were not released in that territory.

=== 12" and maxi singles ===
Year	Title	Peak chart positions	Peaches:
Year	Title	AUS	Peaches:
1978	"Shake Your Groove Thing"	—	Linda Greene
1979	"Roller Skatin' Mate"	—	Linda Greene
1980	"Fun Time"	—	Linda Greene
1981	"Freeway"	—	Linda Greene
1994	"Shake Your Groove Thing" (Serious Rope Remixes)	71	Linda Greene

== Legacy ==
The disco song "Shake Your Groove Thing" has featured prominently in many films such as An Extremely Goofy Movie, Monster, The Adventures of Priscilla, Queen of the Desert,The Sweetest Thing, Connie and Carla, Marock, Sausage Party, The Country Bears, Shrek Forever After, The Bad Guys 2, Night at the Museum: Secret of the Tomb, and Alvin and the Chipmunks: The Squeakquel which is covered by The Chipmunks and The Chipettes as well as in an advertisement campaign by Intel in the late 1990s.

In June 2009, rock band Faith No More opened their set at Brixton Academy with their own cover of "Reunited"; the song alluding to the band's own eleven-year break up and subsequent reunion. They subsequently did the same for their headlining slot at Download Festival on June 12, 2009.

== See also ==
- Music of Washington, D.C.
- List of Soul Train episodes
- List of artists who reached number one in the United States
- List of acts who appeared on American Bandstand
- List of Polydor Records artists
- List of performers on Top of the Pops
- List of artists who reached number one on the Billboard R&B chart
