= Freddie Perren =

American songwriter, musician, producer, arranger, and conductor (1943–2004)

- Born: Frederick James Perren; May 15, 1943; Englewood, New Jersey, U.S.
- Origin: Los Angeles, California, U.S.
- Died: December 16, 2004 (aged 61) Chatsworth, California, U.S.
- Genres: R&B, soul, funk, disco, dance-pop
- Occupations: Record producer, songwriter, arranger
- Instrument: Keyboards
- Years active: 1968–1986
- Formerly of: The Corporation

Frederick James Perren (May 15, 1943 – December 16, 2004) was an American songwriter, musician, record producer, arranger, and orchestra conductor. He co-wrote and produced a series of major chart songs, including "Boogie Fever" by the Sylvers, "I Will Survive" by Gloria Gaynor, "Reunited" and "Shake Your Groove Thing" by Peaches & Herb, and "Love Machine" by the Miracles.

== Biography ==
=== Early life ===
Perren was born on May 15, 1943, in Englewood, New Jersey, and graduated from Englewood's Dwight Morrow High School with future songwriting partner Alphonse Mizell in 1961. Perren attended Howard University in Washington, D.C. graduating in 1966. It was here he met future Capitol Records R&B A&R executive Larkin Arnold. He met Christine Yarian in 1967, and they married in 1970. They remained married until his death. She also co-wrote some songs with him.

=== Motown and The Jackson 5 ===
Shortly after moving to California from Washington, D.C., in 1968, Perren and bassist Alphonzo Mizell met guitarist Deke Richards. They started writing songs together. In 1969 Motown president Berry Gordy invited them to be part of his collective The Corporation, a collection of songwriters and record producers for the Jackson 5. "I Want You Back" was the first hit from this new collaboration, going to number one on the Billboard Hot 100 in early 1970. They wrote and produced more Jackson 5 hits such as "ABC", "The Love You Save", "Mama's Pearl", and "Maybe Tomorrow", among others. Perren and the Corporation continued their work for Motown on soundtracks such as Hell Up in Harlem and Cooley High, which featured "It's So Hard to Say Goodbye to Yesterday" (later a hit for Boyz II Men).

=== The birth of disco and a break with Motown ===
Perren then moved into the disco arena with the hits "Do It Baby" and "Love Machine" for The Miracles. By 1976, Perren had left Motown and headed over to Capitol Records where another old college friend, Larkin Arnold, was now vice-president. In the next two years, Perren had success with The Sylvers, producing their first two Capitol albums. They had two gold singles, "Boogie Fever" and "Hot Line", and a top ten single "High School Dance".

=== Tavares and Fever ===
Also successful collaborations for Perren were Tavares, for whom he produced three albums—Sky High!, Love Storm, and Future Bound. Commercial highlights of his work with the group include co-writing and producing the number-one disco hits "Don't Take Away the Music" and "Heaven Must Be Missing An Angel", and producing the group's take on The Bee Gees' "More Than A Woman". Both groups' versions were featured in the landmark 1977 movie and soundtrack to Saturday Night Fever. The Bee Gees recorded another of their own compositions, "If I Can't Have You", for the film and its soundtrack, but after hearing the Perren-produced version by Yvonne Elliman, preferred it to their own, which was relegated to a b-side. The Elliman production topped the Hot 100 and went gold for U.S. sales over one million. The Saturday Night Fever soundtrack album sold over 15 million copies and, in 1979, Perren received a Grammy Award for Album of the Year for his contribution, the first of two back-to-back Grammys he earned.

=== MVP Productions and "Reunited" ===
In 1978, Perren signed Peaches & Herb to his production company, MVP Productions. Through him, the duo inked a deal with Polydor Records. Their first Polydor album, 2 Hot, included the gold single and top five pop and R&B hit "Shake Your Groove Thing", as well the number-one crossover smash "Reunited" and third single "We've Got Love". 2 Hot went platinum on the strength of those three hits, occupying the number-two pop albums spot for six weeks in early 1979. Peaches & Herb follow-up Twice the Fire went gold and yielded the singles, "Roller Skate Mate (Part 1)", and "I Pledge My Love".

=== "Survive": the peak and decline of disco ===
He received his second accolade from the Recording Academy by winning the first Grammy Award for Best Disco Recording in 1980 for Gloria Gaynor's "I Will Survive." Gaynor's recording went to number one in both the U.S. and the UK, eventually being certified double platinum by the RIAA for sales of over four million copies in the U.S. The song became a disco classic and has been recorded by dozens of artists in the decades since its debut, including charting versions by Cake, Chantay Savage, and Diana Ross. However, the disco craze had been so overwhelming in some quarters that it caused a backlash so strong that the Recording Academy reacted by omitting the category before the following year; this, then, was the only Grammy specifically awarded for the disco genre. After leaving Polydor in 1981, Perren attempted to produce acts on other labels such as Warner Bros. Records (for Atkins in 1982) and Atlantic (for The Spinners' 1982 album Grand Slam and Johnny Gill's self-titled debut).

=== Later years ===
Perren last worked with New Edition in 1986 on their Under the Blue Moon, but by the end of the decade he was largely inactive as a writer and producer. In the 1990s, Perren experienced a resurgence of success as the boyband phenomenon sought musical credibility and instant recognizability with covers of 1970s soul-disco hits. Boyz II Men eclipsed the success of the G.C. Cameron original with their cover of Perren's "It's So Hard to Say Goodbye to Yesterday", hitting number two on the Hot 100 and the top spot on the Hot R&B Singles chart. The song was later covered by Irish boyband Westlife. In 1998, British boyband 911 took a cover of "More Than a Woman" to number two in the UK Singles Chart.

In 1993, Perren suffered a massive stroke. He died 11 years later at the age of 61 in his home in Chatsworth, Los Angeles. He is interred in the Forest Lawn Memorial Park (Hollywood Hills).
