= List of music released posthumously =

The following is a list of music released posthumously.

== 19th century and earlier ==
- Ludwig van Beethoven had numerous works not released in his lifetime; these include, but are not limited to:
  - Für Elise
  - Piano Concerto No. 0
  - Violin Concerto in C
- Frédéric Chopin's opuses 66–74 contain more than 20 posthumous works:
  - Fantaisie-Impromptu
  - Nocturne in C-sharp minor
- "Beautiful Dreamer", published in 1864, shortly after the death of songwriter Stephen Foster; at the time of publication of its first edition, it was promoted as "the last song ever written by Stephen C. Foster, composed but a few days prior to his death," though it actually may have been written as early as 1862.
- The phonautograms of Édouard-Léon Scott de Martinville could not be played back until long after his death in 1879, as they required digital technology.

== 20th century ==
=== 1900s–1950s ===
- "Cannibal Carnival", a dance barbarique, was published in late May 1920, three months after composer Sol P. Levy's death on Valentine's Day earlier that year. Levy's composition was later popularized as thematic stock material in such films as Trader Horn and the Tarzan film series.
- Karelian kantele player Iivana Mišukka's posthumous album Iivana Mišukka (with Arja Kastinen) was released on February 6, 2026, almost 107 years after his death. It features songs recorded on wax cylinders between 1916 and 1917, combined with Kastinen's kantele.
- Karelian kantele player Teppana Jänis' posthumous album Teppana Jänis (with Arja Kastinen and Taito Hoffrén) was released on February 28, 2021, 99 years after his death. It features songs recorded on wax cylinders between 1916 and 1917, combined with Kastinen's kantele and Hoffrén's vocals.
- Turandot, a three-act opera by Giacomo Puccini, was finished by fellow composer Franco Alfano and premiered, almost two years after Puccini's death, on April 25, 1926.
- Country singer Jimmie Rodgers' last 25 songs were released between 1933 and 1938 after his death from tuberculosis on May 26, 1933.
- Blues legend Robert Johnson's work was released after his death in 1938. Three albums were released: King of the Delta Blues Singers (1961), King of the Delta Blues Singers, Vol. II (1970) and The Complete Recordings (1990).
- Fats Navarro's The Complete Blue Note and Capitol Recordings of Fats Navarro and Tadd Dameron released by Blue Note Records in 1995. Also is featured on Dizzy Gillespie's The Complete RCA Victor Recordings (1995).
- Charlie Christian died of tuberculosis in 1942. He worked with Benny Goodman and Lionel Hampton. His album Solo Flight: The Genius of Charlie Christian (1972), appears on Dizzy Gillespie's The Complete RCA Victor Recordings (1995), appears on Goodman's Solo Flight, with the Benny Goodman Sextet (2003), Electric, with the Benny Goodman Sextet and the Charlie Christian Quartet (2003) and others.
- "Your Cheatin' Heart", "Kaw-Liga", and "Take These Chains from My Heart", three singles released after Hank Williams' death from a heart attack in January 1953, brought on by a fatal combination of alcohol, chloral hydrate, vitamin B12, and morphine.
  - The song "There's a Tear in My Beer", which was a demo recorded in 1950, was reworked as a duet with his son Hank Williams Jr. for his album Greatest Hits, Vol. 3, which was released on February 1989, 36 years after Williams' death.
- American rhythm and blues singer Johnny Ace's only compilation album Memorial Album was released in 1957, three years after his death from an accidental gunshot. Originally it was released as a shorter version entitled Memorial Album for Johnny Ace, released in 1955.
- Charlie Parker had two albums released after his death in 1955: The Genius of Charlie Parker, #1 – Night and Day (1957) and Dizzy Gillespie's The Complete RCA Victor Recordings (1995).
- Clifford Brown's work was released after his death in 1956. Two albums with Max Roach were Daahoud (1972) and Alone Together: The Best of the Mercury Years (1995).
- Most of Big Bill Broonzy's work was released after he died from throat cancer in 1958, including albums such as Trouble in Mind (2000).
- "Peggy Sue Got Married" and other songs by Buddy Holly were released after his death in a plane crash in February 1959.
  - Ritchie Valens, who died along with Holly, his two albums, a self-titled album and Ritchie were released in February and October 1959, respectively; only the former released nine days after his death.
    - Nearly two years later, his live album In Concert at Pacoima Jr. High was released in December 1960.
  - The Big Bopper, who also died in the accident, wrote Johnny Preston's song "Running Bear", which was released a few months after his death.
- American jazz saxophonist Lester Young's final album Le Dernier Message de Lester Young, which was recorded on March 4, 1959, was released a few months after his death from internal bleeding on March 15.
  - Sixty-three years later, a 2022 edition of this album, which includes the last studio track "D.B. Blues" recorded four days before his death, was released.
- Last Recordings was released just days after Billie Holiday's death from heart disease and cirrhosis of the liver in July 1959.
  - The album Remixed and Reimagined was released on August 7, 2007, 48 years after her death.
- American blues singer and guitarist Blind Willie McTell's first long play album Last Session, which was recorded in 1956, was released in 1961, two years after his death from a stroke on August 19, 1959.
  - His second long play album, Blind Willie McTell: 1940, which features some unreleased songs, was released in 1966, seven years after his death.

=== 1960s ===
- Jesse Belvin's work Mr. Easy featuring Art Pepper and Marty Paich Orchestra (1960), Yesterdays (1975), Hang Your Tears out To Dry (1986) and others were released after he died in a car crash in February 1960.
- The singles "Lonely" and "Weekend" were released after Eddie Cochran's death in a taxi accident in April 1960.
- Several of country singer Johnny Horton's albums and singles were released during the rest of the decade.
- Several of Patsy Cline's singles and albums were released after her death in a 1963 plane crash, including the singles "Leavin' on Your Mind", "Sweet Dreams (Of You)", and "Faded Love", which became hits, and the albums The Patsy Cline Story, A Portrait of Patsy Cline, That's How a Heartache Begins, and Patsy Cline's Greatest Hits.
- The Beatles' early member Stuart Sutcliffe appears on Anthology 1 released in 1995. He played bass on the songs "Hallelujah, I Love Her So", "You'll Be Mine" and "Cayenne", which had been recorded in 1960. Sutcliffe died in 1962 before the Beatles became famous.
- Many of Elmore James' singles and albums were released after his death in 1963. Notable singles include "Bleeding Heart", "One Way Out" and "Every Day I Have the Blues". Albums Whose Muddy Shoes (1969), Street Talkin' (1975), King of the Slide Guitar (1992) and The Classic Early Recordings: 1951–1956 (1993), etc.
- Sam Cooke's albums Shake and Try a Little Love were both released in 1965, a year after he was shot dead.
- Jim Reeves' album The Jim Reeves Way was released in 1965, a year after his death.
  - Yours Sincerely was released in 1966, Two years after his death.
  - The album Blue Side of Lonesome was released on April 24, 1967, Three years after his death.
  - Six months later, My Cathedral was released on October 23, 1967.
  - A Touch of Sadness was released on March 25, 1968, Almost four years after his death.
  - The album And Some Friends was released in 1969, Five years after his death.
  - Jim Reeves Writes You a Record was released in 1971, Seven years after his death.
- Eric Dolphy's live album called Here And There was released on May 1966, Almost two years after his death in 1964.
- Nat King Cole died of lung cancer in February 1965. His album Unreleased was released in 1983, featuring previously unreleased songs.
- Sonny Boy Williamson II's albums Sonny Boy Williamson and the Yardbirds (1966), The Real Folk Blues (1966) and other albums and singles were released after his death in 1965.
- Bobby Fuller had many albums released after his mysterious death in 1966, including The Bobby Fuller Tapes Vol. 1 (1983) and The Bobby Fuller Tapes Vol. 2 (1984).
- Mexican singer and actor Javier Solís' album Vida de Bohemio was released in 1966 some time after his death from complications due to gallbladder surgery.
- Many of Woody Guthrie's recordings were released in albums after his death in 1967. See the Woody Guthrie discography.
- Chilean singer Violeta Parra had several albums released after her suicide in 1967, including Violeta Parra y sus canciones reencontradas en París and Canciones de Violeta Parra, both in 1971.
- John Coltrane's album Om was released in January 1968, six months after his death.
  - Six months later, his collaborative album with Alice Coltrane, Cosmic Music, was released in July 1968.
  - Selflessness: Featuring My Favorite Things was released in 1969, Two years after his death.
  - The album Transition was released in July 1970, Three years after his death.
  - Sun Ship was released on April 16, 1971, Four years after his death.
  - The album Infinity was released in September 1972, Five years after his death.
  - Interstellar Space, an album containing his last recordings was released in September 1974, Six years after his death.
  - The album First Meditations (for quartet) was released in December 1977, Ten years after his death.
  - Stellar Regions was released on October 10, 1995, 28 years after his death.
  - The compilation album entitled Living Space was released on March 10, 1998, 31 years after his death.
  - Both Directions at Once, an unreleased album recorded in 1963 was released on June 29, 2018, 51 years after his death.
  - His last album Blue World was released on September 27, 2019, 52 years after his death.
  - A Love Supreme: Live in Seattle was released on October 22, 2021, 54 years after his death.
  - His collaborative album with Eric Dolphy entitled Evenings at the Village Gate was released on July 14, 2023, 57 years after Coltrane's death and 59 years after Dolphy's death.
- The single "(Sittin' On) The Dock of the Bay" was released on January 8, 1968, less a month after the December plane crash that killed singer Otis Redding.
  - A month later, his album The Dock of the Bay was released on February 23, 1968.
  - The Immortal Otis Redding was released four months later on June 15, 1968.
  - Love Man was released on June 20, 1969, Two years and six months after his death.
  - His last studio album entitled Tell the Truth was released on July 1, 1970, Three years and seven months after his death.
  - The compilation album entitled Remember Me featuring 22 unissued tracks was released on March 29, 1992, 25 years after his death.
- French singer Édith Piaf's last recording, "L'homme de Berlin", was released five years after she died of liver cancer in October 1963.
  - Her album Symphonique featuring Legendis Orchestra was released on October 13, 2023, 60 years after her death.
- "I'm Sorry" and "Seabreeze" by Frankie Lymon were released in 1969, a year after Lymon's death from an accidental heroin overdose.
- Little Willie John's album Ninety Sixty Six was released in 2008, 40 years after he died of a heart attack in jail.
- Wes Montgomery's albums Road Song (1968), Willow Weep for Me (1969) and Eulogy (1970) were released after his sudden passing.
- The Sheik of Shake by Dickie Pride was released in 1992, 23 years after he died from an accidental overdose.
- Fairport Convention's drummer, Martin Lamble, was killed in a car accident nearly two months before their album Unhalfbricking was released in October 1969.
- Brian Jones of The Rolling Stones drowned in a swimming pool in July 1969. The band's album Let It Bleed was released five months later. He appeared in two songs: "Midnight Rambler" and "You Got the Silver".
  - He was featured on The Beatles' song "You Know My Name (Look Up the Number)", which was recorded in 1967 and was released on March 6, 1970, eight months after his death.
  - He produced the live album Brian Jones Presents the Pipes of Pan at Joujouka by the Master Musicians of Joujouka, which was released on October 1971, two years after his death.
  - He was featured in the live album The Rolling Stones Rock and Roll Circus, which was recorded live on December 11 and 12, 1968 and was released on October 14, 1996, 27 years after his death.

=== 1970s ===
- Several of Otis Spann's work was released after his death. Last Call: Live at Boston Tea Party was released in 2000 as it was recorded shortly before his passing.
- Earl Hooker appears on Sonny Terry's and Brownie McGhee's I Couldn't Believe My Eyes (1973) which was recorded in 1969 a year before he died.
- The last album of Alan Wilson with Canned Heat was Hooker 'n Heat in collaboration with John Lee Hooker was released in 1971. He is also featured on Live at Topanga Corral (1971), Woodstock 2 (1971), and Uncanned! The Best of Canned Heat (1994).
  - His solo album Alan Wilson: The Blind Owl was released in 2013, 43 years later.
- Tammi Terrell's compilation album The Essential Collection was released on July 1, 2001, 31 years after her death from cancer.
- Most of the extensive catalog of American guitarist Jimi Hendrix; in his lifetime, Hendrix only saw the release of three albums by the Jimi Hendrix Experience, a compilation by the same group, and a live album by the Band of Gypsys. The Cry of Love (1971), Valleys of Neptune (2010), West Coast Seattle Boy: The Jimi Hendrix Anthology (2010), People, Hell and Angels (2013), Both Sides of the Sky (2018).
- Janis Joplin's album Pearl was released on January 11, 1971, three months after her death. Joplin had recorded all the vocals for all the songs (except "Buried Alive In The Blues") before she died. Her band, the Full Tilt Boogie Band, recorded the music.
  - Her second posthumous album entitled Farewell Song was released in February 1982, about 12 years after her death.
  - Her rarity album Rare Pearls was released in 1999, the nine-disc set Blow All My Blues Away (2012) and The Pearl Sessions (2012).
  - The compilation album This Is Janis Joplin was released in 1995, about 25 years after her death.
  - She also appeared on The Lost Tapes with Big Brother and the Holding Company released in 2008.
- Baby Huey's only album The Baby Huey Story: The Living Legend was released in February 1971, four months after his death from a drug overdose.
- Arlester "Dyke" Christian of Dyke and the Blazers had three compilations released after his death in 1971. So Sharp (1983), The Funky Broadway (1999), and We Got More Soul (2007).
- Louis Armstrong's live album Satchmo at The National Press Club, which was recorded live on January 29, 1971, was released in 1972, some time after his death from a heart attack. 40 years later, it was re-released with a complete performance.
- Jim Morrison's poetry album An American Prayer was released on November 17, 1978, seven years after his death.
  - The Doors' live album Alive, She Cried was released in October 1983, 12 years after his death.
  - The Doors: Box Set was released in October 28, 1997, 26 years after Morrison's death. This box set featured many unreleased tracks and live songs.
- Duane Allman had many albums released after his death in 1971 in a motorcycle accident such as An Anthology (1972), An Anthology Vol. II (1974), and Eat a Peach (1972) with The Allman Brothers Band.
- Berry Oakley also with the Allman Brothers Band died in a motorcycle crash near where Duane Allman was killed a year earlier. He is featured in Brothers and Sisters in 1973.
- Peruvian singer Lucha Reyes' albums Lucha por siempre... Lucha and El show de Lucha Reyes were released in 1974 after her death from a heart attack in 1973.
- Lee Morgan's final album The Last Session was released in May 1972, three months after he was shot to death.
  - He was featured on Charles Earland's Intensity (1972), Charles III (1973), and Funk Fantastique (2004). All of this was recorded just days before his death.
- Linda Jones' Soul Talkin was released in 2008. She died in 1972 from diabetes.
- Leslie Harvey is featured on Stone the Crows' live albums The BBC Sessions Vol. 1. and 2 (1998), Live Montreux 1972 (2002), Radio Sessions 1969–1972 (2009), and BBC Sessions 1969–1972 (2014). All the band's albums were recorded between 1969 and 1972. He died in 1972 when he was electrocuted.
- The only album that New York Dolls' Billy Murcia played on is Lipstick Killers – The Mercer Street Sessions 1972 (1981). Murcia died in November 1972.
- Danny Whitten who was the guitarist for Neil Young and Crazy Horse appears on Young's Tonight's the Night (1975), Gone Dead Train: The Best of Crazy Horse 1971–1989 (2005), Scratchy: The Complete Reprise Recordings (2005), and Live at the Fillmore East (2006). Also appeared on Young's The Archives Vol. 1 1963–1972.
- Ron "Pigpen" McKernan, founding member of the Grateful Dead, is featured in many albums since his death in 1973. He died from gastrointestinal bleeding from years of alcoholism.
- Clarence White was killed in 1973 after being hit by a drunk driver. He is featured on Kentucky Colonels, his solo albums and The Byrds' Live at the Fillmore – February 1969 (2000), Live at Royal Albert Hall 1971 (2008) and The Lost Broadcasts (2011).
- Spanish singer Nino Bravo's album ...y volumen 5 and many unreleased songs on compilation albums were released after his death in April 1973. He died in a car accident.
- Gram Parsons' album Grievous Angel was released in January 1974, Four months after his death from a drug overdose.
  - Sleepless Nights was released in April 1976, Two years and seven months after his death.
  - The compilation album entitled Another Side of This Life was released on December 19, 2000, 27 years and 3 months after his death.
  - Sacred Hearts & Fallen Angels was released on May 1, 2001, 28 years after his death.
  - The compilation album entitled The Complete Reprise Sessions was released on June 20, 2006, 33 years and 9 months after his death.
- Several of Jim Croce's singles and albums were released after his 1973 death in a plane crash along with Maury Muehleisen. Together their work was released posthumously.
- Maury Muehleisen's album Before the Ever Since: Early Recordings 1969–1970 (2006) and a reissue of 1970's Gingerbreadd (2006) edition was released after he died in a plane crash in 1973 along with Jim Croce.
- Chilean singer Víctor Jara's albums Tiempos que cambian and Manifiesto were released in 1974, a year after his death.
- Bobby Darin's Live at the Desert Inn (1987) was recorded in 1971. Darin died following heart surgery in 1973.
- Duke Ellington's Eastbourne Performance was released in 1975, a year after his death.
- Graham Bond's Live at Klooks Kleek was released in 1988, 14 years after his death. The album was recorded in 1964 with the Graham Bond Organisation.
- Mama Cass of The Mamas & the Papas is featured on The Mamas & the Papas Complete Anthology (1999) with previously unreleased tracks. Cass died in 1974.
- Various home recordings by Nick Drake have been released since his death in 1974 to satisfy growing interest in his work.
- Peruvian folk singer Picaflor de los Andes' final album Para Huanca... Yo was released some time in 1976, a year after his death.
- Various solo albums by Pete Ham, 7 Park Avenue (1997), Golders Green (1999) and The Keywhole Street Demos 1966–67 (2013) were released several after his death in 1975.
- Various live recordings and studio outtakes by Tim Buckley have been released posthumously 1975 from an accidental overdose of heroin and alcohol.
- Al Jackson Jr. drummer for Booker T. & the M.G.'s was murdered in 1975. He appears on the bands albums' The Very Best of Booker T. & the MG's (1994), Play The 'Hip Hits' (1995), Time Is Tight (1998) and Stax Instrumentals (2002), all have unreleased tracks.
- Bernard Herrmann's soundtrack album Taxi Driver: Original Soundtrack Recording, which was the final score recorded between 22 and 23 December 1975, was released on May 19, 1998, 22 years and a half after his death from a heart attack on December 24, 1975.
- Blues legend Howlin' Wolf had various albums released after his death in 1976, including His Best (1997).
- Many of Vince Guaraldi's work was released after his in death in 1976 due to a sudden heart attack. Featuring Jazz Casual: Paul Winter / Bola Sete & Vince Guaraldi (2001), A Charlie Brown Christmas (2006 & 2012) editions, The Definitive Vince Guaraldi (2009), and Vince Guaraldi and the Lost Cues from the Charlie Brown Television Specials Vol. 1 (2006) and Vol. 2 (2010).
- Florence Ballard only album The Supreme Florence "Flo" Ballard (2002). Originally the album was supposed to be released by ABC Records in 1968 under the proposed title, "...You Don't Have To".
- Paul Kossoff's 2nd Street (1976) and Koss (1977) were released after he died from a pulmonary embolism whilst on a flight from Los Angeles to New York in 1976.
- The Yardbirds' Keith Relf is featured many live Yardbirds albums like BBC Sessions and Live! Blueswailing July '64. Also his singles "Together Now" and "All the Fallen Angels" were both released in 1989. "All the Fallen Angels" was recorded in 1976 just 12 days before his death.
- Jimmy Reed died in 1976 of respiratory failure. Two albums were released after his death: I'm Going to Upside Your Head (1980) and I'm the Man Down There (1985).
- Many of Peter Laughner's work was released after his death in 1977. Albums Peter Laughner (1982), Take the Guitar Player for a Ride (1994), and The Day the Earth Met the Rocket from the Tombs (2002) by Rocket from the Tombs. Also appears on Pere Ubu's The Shape of Things (2000).
- Several of Elvis Presley albums have been released since his death in 1977. In October 1977 Elvis in Concert was released two months after his death.
  - The compilation album entitled If I Can Dream featuring The Royal Philharmonic Orchestra was released on October 30, 2015, 38 years after his death.
  - The Wonder of You was released on October 21, 2016, 39 years after his death.
  - The album Where No One Stands Alone was released on August 10, 2018, 41 years after his death.
  - The box set called Sunset Boulevard was released on August 1, 2025, 48 years after his death.
- Several albums were released after Marc Bolan's death in 1977. Featuring his solo albums, work he did with John's Children and concert albums he did with T. Rex. Featuring You Scare Me to Death which was released in 1981.
- Bing Crosby's Seasons was released after he died. Singles "Peace on Earth/Little Drummer Boy" with David Bowie was released in 1982 and "True Love" with Grace Kelly was released in 1983. Many other albums have been released since 1977.
- The only solo album recorded by Steve Gaines of Lynyrd Skynyrd, One in the Sun, was released in 1988, 11 years after he died in a plane crash.
- Ronnie Van Zandt of Lynyrd Skynyrd was featured on Skynyrd's First and... Last (1978) recorded during their early years. He died in 1977, in the same plane crash as Steve Gaines.
- Many of Rahsaan Roland Kirk's work was released after his death in 1977. Featuring I, Eye, Aye: Live at the Montreux Jazz Festival, 1972 (1996), Dog Years in the Fourth Ring (1997), and Brotherman in the Fatherland (2006).
- French singer Claude François's single "Alexandrie Alexandra" was released in 1978, four days after his accidental death in his home.
- Chicago's Terry Kath is featured on Chicago Presents the Innovative Guitar of Terry Kath (1997) and Chicago XXXIV: Live in '75 (2011). He accidentally shot himself in 1978.
- Sandy Denny has had several albums released since her death, including Who Knows Where the Time Goes? (1985), The BBC Sessions 1971–1973 (1997), Gold Dust (1998), and Sandy Denny (2011).
- Keith Moon of The Who is featured in many live albums that were released after his death in 1978 of a drug overdose.
- Mel Street's album Many Moods of Mel was released in 1980, two years after he committed suicide.
- Chris Bell's debut album I Am the Cosmos was released in 1992, 14 years after he was killed in a car accident.
- Judee Sill's album Dreams Come True was released on February 22, 2005, 26 years after her death in 1979.
  - Abracadabra: The Asylum Years was released on June 19, 2006, 27 years after her death.
  - The compilation album Live in London: The BBC Recordings 1972–1973 was released on May 22, 2007, 28 years after her death.
- Sex Pistols bassist Sid Vicious has been the subject of a plethora of posthumous solo albums in the years following his death of a heroin overdose in 1979.
- Lowell George appears on Little Feat's Down on the Farm released after the band broke up that same year and Hoy-Hoy! (1981) and other Little Feat albums. He did an album with Bonnie Raitt Ultrasonic Studios 1972 (Live) (2014). He also appears on Frank Zappa's You Can't Do That on Stage Anymore Vol. 1 (1988), Vol. 4 (1991), Vol. 5 (1992), Mystery Disc (1998) and other Zappa albums.
- Jimmy McCulloch of Paul McCartney and Wings is featured on Thunderclap Newman's Beyond Hollywood (2010).
- John Glascock is featured in many of Jethro Tull's albums like 20 Years of Jethro Tull (1988) and The Best of Jethro Tull – The Anniversary Collection (1993). He is also featured in other bands Carmen's and Toe Fat's albums.

=== 1980s ===
- Two songs performed by Donny Hathaway (in collaboration with Roberta Flack) – "Back Together Again" and "You Are My Heaven" – were released in 1980, one year following his death.
  - These Songs for You, Live! was released on June 8, 2004, 23 years after his death.
- Two singles and Love Lives Forever were released in 1980 after Minnie Riperton died a year earlier.
- AC/DC's box set Bonfire was released on November 28, 1997, Seventeen years after Bon Scott died of alcohol poisoning in 1980.
  - The compilation album Volts was also released on the same day as the Bonfire box set on November 28, 1997.
  - He was also featured on another box set entitled Backtracks released on November 10, 2009, 29 years after his death.
- Jazz pianist Bill Evans released two albums I Will Say Goodbye (1980) and You Must Believe in Spring (1981), after he died of pneumonia and complications with a gastric ulcer on September 15, 1980. He also released many live albums after his death.
- The non-album single "Love Will Tear Us Apart" was released in June 1980, a month after the suicide of Joy Division lead singer Ian Curtis on May 18 of that year. Its music video was also released. The remaining members of Joy Division later went on to form New Order.
  - A month later, their final album Closer was released on July 18, 1980.
  - The compilation album Still was released on October 8, 1981, A Year and five months after his death.
  - Substance was released on July 11, 1988, Eight years after his death.
  - The two The Peel Sessions EP's were originally released in both November 1986 & September 1987. While the entire compilation of both sessions was released in September 1990, Ten years after his death.
  - Their planned debut album Warsaw was released in 1994, Fourteen years after his death.
  - The Heart and Soul box set was released in December 1997, Seventeen years after his death.
  - The live album entitled Preston 28 February 1980 was released in May 1999, Nineteen years after his death.
  - The Complete BBC Recordings was released in October 2000, Twenty years after his death.
  - Les Bains Douches 18 December 1979 was released in April 2001, 21 years after his death.
  - The compilation album entitled Martin Hannett's Personal Mixes was released in June 2007, 27 years after his death.
- Ricky Lancelotti appears on Frank Zappa's The Lost Episodes and Läther, both released in 1996. He died in 1980.
- Punk musician Darby Crash is featured on the Germs' What We Do Is Secret and Germicide, both released in 1981. Crash committed suicide in 1980.
- John Lennon was murdered by a Beatles fan Mark David Chapman on December 8, 1980. His singles "Woman" and "Watching the Wheels" were both released in 1981.
  - The recording of Elton John's 1974 Madison Square Garden concert, in which Lennon performed, was released as a live album entitled Live! 28 November 1974 in 1981, a year after his death. It was later included on the 1995 reissue of Elton's double live album Here and There.
  - The album Milk and Honey came out on January 9, 1984, three years after his death.
  - Live in New York City was released on February 10, 1986, five years and two months after his death.
  - Nine months later, his 2nd posthumous album entitled Menlove Ave. was released on November 3, 1986.
  - The soundtrack album of the documentary called Imagine: John Lennon was released on October 10, 1988, almost eight years after his death.
  - The Beatles' songs "Free as a Bird" and "Real Love" were released in 1995, 15 years after his death. Both songs featured the three surviving Beatles playing instruments over Lennon's demos.
  - His remix album entitled Double Fantasy Stripped Down was released on October 5, 2010, almost 30 years after his death.
  - On the same day the Gimme Some Truth box set was released also on October 5, 2010.
  - Gimme Some Truth. The Ultimate Mixes was released on October 9, 2020, almost 40 years after his death.
  - Lennon also appears on many of The Beatles' album re-issues released since his death.
  - The Beatles' song "Now and Then" was originally a Lennon's demo and was recorded in around 1977, it featured the three surviving Beatles playing instruments recorded in 1995. Then Lennon's voice was extracted using Peter Jackson's MAL technology, and the song was finished and released on November 2, 2023, almost 43 years after Lennon's death, and almost 22 years after Harrison's death.
  - The Power To The People box set was released on October 10, 2025, 45 years after Lennon's death.
  - Lennon's song "Little Girl", which was a home demo recorded sometime in 1965, was featured in The Beatles' reissue album Rubber Soul: Special Edition, which was released on October 2, 2026, almost 46 years after his death.
- Tim Hardin's albums Unforgiven and The Homecoming Concert were both less than a year after his death. Other songs were released on other albums compilations album years later.
- Mike Bloomfield's albums Living in the Fast Lane (1981), Bloomfield: A Retrospective (1983) and I'm with You Always (2008) were released after his death.
- Coda (1982) by Led Zeppelin was released two years after the death of John Bonham. Bonham is featured in many live albums of the band.
- Keith Green's album The Prodigal Son was released in August 15, 1983, a year after his death from a plane crash.
  - Jesus Commands Us to Go! was released on July 20, 1984, two years after his death.
  - The compilation album entitled The Ministry Years was released between 1987 & 1988, five to six years after his death.
- Dennis Wilson's album Bambu (The Caribou Sessions) was released on April 22, 2017, 34 years after he drowned in the ocean in 1983.
  - He appears on some unreleased demos of The Beach Boys that were released years after his death.
- The Soldier on the Wall by punk legend Alex Harvey was released in 1983, a year after his death from a heart attack.
  - The Sensational Alex Harvey Band's first live album entitled BBC Radio 1 Live in Concert, which was recorded for the BBC at The Paris Theatre 1972 and The Hippodrome 1973, was released in 1991, nine years after Harvey's death.
  - Their second live album entitled Live on the Test, which was recorded for the BBC between 1973 and 1977, was released in 1995, 13 years after Harvey's death.
  - Their third live album entitled The Gospel According to Harvey, which contains the live recording of Reading Festival in 1977, was released in 1998, 16 years after Harvey's death.
  - The reissue of the album Alex Harvey and His Soul Band, which contains 20 previously unreleased songs, was released in 1999, 17 years after Harvey's death.
  - His album entitled Teenage a Go Go - The Unreleased Recordings of Alex Harvey 1963-67 was released in 2003, 21 years after his death.
  - Their fourth live album entitled British Tour '76 was released in 2004, 22 years after Harvey's death.
  - Their fifth live album entitled U.S. Tour '74 was released in 2006, 24 years after Harvey's death.
  - The album entitled Hot City, which is the early version of The Impossible Dream, was released in 2009, 27 years after Harvey's death.
  - The box set entitled Last of the Teenage Idols, which contains 21 previously unreleased songs, was released in 2016, 34 years after his death.
- Confrontation (1983) by Bob Marley and the Wailers was released two years after Marley's death from metastatic melanoma.
- The Carpenters released their album Voice of the Heart on October 18, 1983, Eight months after Karen Carpenter's death.
  - An Old-Fashioned Christmas was released on October 26, 1984, A Year after her death.
  - The album Lovelines was released on October 31, 1989, Six years after her death.
  - Karen's Self-Titled Album was released on October 7, 1996, Thirteen years after her death.
  - Their last album called As Time Goes By. was released on August 1, 2001, Eighteen years after her death.
- Peruvian singer-songwriter Chabuca Granda's final album Por Siempre... was released in 1983 some time after her death from heart disease.
  - Her album Chabuca Inédita, which contains outtakes recorded on June 13, 1968, was released in 2005, 22 years after her death.
- The Pretenders' Pete Farndon and James Honeyman-Scott were both featured on the 2006 remaster editions of Pretenders and Pretenders II with previously unreleased material and demos. Honeyman-Scott died in 1982 and Fandon in 1983, both of drug overdoses.
- Thelonious Monk's albums Thelonious Monk: The Complete Riverside Recordings (1986), Thelonious Monk Nonet Live in Paris 1967 (1988), Thelonious Monk Quartet with John Coltrane at Carnegie Hall (2005), The Complete 1957 Riverside Recordings (2006), and many others since his death in 1982.
- Muddy Waters' albums Rollin' Stone: The Golden Anniversary Collection (2000), The Anthology: 1947–1972 (2001), Breakin' It Up, Breakin' It Down (2007) and Live at the Checkerboard Lounge, Chicago 1981 (2012), etc.
- Chris Wood's only album Vulcan was released in 2008. It was recorded in 1983, the same year he died.
- Klaus Nomi's albums Encore (1983), In Concert (1986) and Za Bakdaz (2007) were released after he died from AIDS in 1983.
- Stukas Over Disneyland by The Dickies was released in 1983 two years after Chuck Wagon's death.
- The album Lost Recordings by The Blues Brothers, which contains unreleased live performances, was released on October 7, 2025, 43 years after John Belushi's death from a drug overdose.
- Stan Rogers died in a burning airplane in June 1983. His first posthumous album For the Family was released a few weeks after his death.
  - His second posthumous album From Fresh Water was released in 1984, a year after his death.
  - His first posthumous live album In Concert, which was recorded live on March 12, 1982, was released in 1991, eight years after his death. Two years later, a remastered version entitled Home in Halifax was released with a slightly different track listing.
  - His second posthumous live album From Coffee House to Concert Hall, which is a compilation album of live performances and studio recordings unreleased, was released in 1999, sixteen years after his death.
  - His box set entitled The Collection was released in 2013, 30 years after his death. It contains a bonus EP entitled Discoveries - Rare Live Recordings with five previously unreleased songs.
- Marvin Gaye's album Dream of a Lifetime was released on May 21, 1985, A Year after he was killed by his father in 1984.
  - Six months later, the album Romantically Yours was released on November 1985.
  - Vulnerable was released on April 22, 1997. Thirteen years after his death.
  - The Complete Duets (with Tammi Terrell) was released in 2001, 17 years after his death, and 31 years after Terrell's death.
  - The live album entitled Marvin Gaye at the Copa was released on April 29, 2005, 21 years after his death.
  - His last album entitled You're The Man was released on March 29, 2019, 35 years after his death.
  - Seven months later, What's Going On Live was released on October 18, 2019.
- Badfinger's live album Day After Day: Live was released on September 24, 1990, 15 years after Pete Ham's death and six years after Tom Evans' death.
  - BBC in Concert 1972–1973 was released in 1997, 22 years after Pete's death and 14 years after Tom's death.
  - Their last studio album called Head First was released on November 14, 2000, 25 years after Pete's death and 17 years after Tom's death.
- Andy Kaufman's Andy and His Grandmother released on July 13, 2013, a comedy album that was recorded from 1977 to 1979. Kaufman died in 1984 from lung cancer and kidney failure.
- Jimmie Spheeris was killed in a motorcycle crash on July 4, 1984, hours after he had recorded his album Spheeris. The album was released in 2000. Paul Delph was featured in this album, four years after his death.
  - His first live album entitled An Evening with Jimmie Spheeris, which was recorded live at Willimantic, Connecticut in October 1976, was released in 2000, 16 years after his death.
  - His second live album entitled Alive in America, which was recorded live at Ebbets Field in Denver, CO on March 12, 1974, was released on January 10, 2023, 19 years after his death.
- Philippé Wynne's final album, self-titled, was released on August 7, 1984, nearly a month after his death from a heart attack following a performance at a nightclub.
- My Place, a solo album by Australian guitarist Guy McDonough (Australian Crawl), was released in 1985 after his death.
- Ricky Wilson appears on The B-52's Bouncing Off the Satellites released in 1986 a year after his death. Also he is featured on Nude on the Moon: The B-52's Anthology (2002), and Live! 8-24-1979 (2015).
- The live album Ballot Result by the punk band The Minutemen was released two years after the death of lead singer/guitarist D. Boon in a van accident.
- Gary Thain and David Byron of Uriah Heep are both featured on Live at Shepperton '74 (1986). Both Thain died in 1975 and Byron died in 1985.
  - Also David Byron is also featured on The Lansdowne Tapes (1993) early recordings of Uriah Heep, Lost and Found (2003) by the David Byron Band and his solo album That Was Only Yesterday – The Last EP (2008).
- Ricky Nelson's unreleased album The Memphis Sessions recorded between 1978 and 1979, was released in May 1986, five months after his death from a plane crash.
- Leila and the Snakes' only eponymous album, which contains unreleased songs recorded in 1978, was released on October 24, 2006, 20 years after Jane Dornacker's death from a helicopter crash.
- Randy Rhoads is featured in Ozzy Osbourne's album Tribute which was a tribute album to Rhoads who died in 1982 was released five years after. The album was work done by Rhoads. Also Quiet Riot released the album The Randy Rhoads Years in 1993 during Rhoads time with the band in the late 1970s.
- Newark 1953 by Hank Mobley was released on April 17, 2012, 27 years after his death.
- Thin Lizzy's live album Live at Sydney Harbour '78 was released in 1988, Two years after Phil Lynott's death in 1986.
  - The Peel Sessions was released on October 6, 1994, Eight years after his death.
  - His solo live album Live in Sweden 1983 on April 23, 2002, Sixteen years after his death.
  - His EP entitled The Lost Recording 1970 was released on June 8, 2006, Twenty years after his death.
  - The live album called Still Dangerous was released on March 2, 2009, 23 years after his death.
  - The compilation album entitled Yellow Pearl was released on July 12, 2010, 24 years after his death.
  - The Acoustic Sessions was released on January 24, 2025, 39 years after his death.
- Richard Manuel's solo work Whispering Pines: Live at the Getaway (2002), Live at O'Tooles Tavern (2009) and Live at the Lone Star (2011). He is also featured many of The Band's albums. He did two last songs with the band, "Country Boy," on Jericho (1993), and "She Knows," on High on the Hog (1996).
- Daniel Balavoine's single "Sauver l'amour" was released in March 1986, two months after he was killed in a helicopter crash.
- The song "To Live Is to Die" on heavy metal band Metallica's fourth studio album ...And Justice for All (1988) was written by bassist Cliff Burton, who died in 1986, when the band's tour bus crashed in Sweden.
- Six years after Harry Chapin's death the album Remember When the Music was released in 1987, The Last Protest Singer in 1988 and many others.
- Paul Butterfield died of an accidental drug overdose on May 4, 1987. Several live albums were released years after his death.
- Hip hop disc jockey and producer Scott La Rock was murdered in 1987. His singles and EPs with KRS-One have been released.
- Peter Tosh was murdered in 1987. He had several live albums and compilations released after his death.
- Andy Gibb's 1991 Self-Titled Compilation Album including "Man on Fire", a track recorded in 1987 was finally released on November 19, 1991, Three years and eight months after his death.
  - A further track by Gibb from the same recording sessions, "Arrow Through the Heart", was included on his brothers' band the Bee Gees' 2010 box set Mythology.
- Bola Sete's albums Ocean Memories (1999), and The Navy Swings (2010) with Vince Guaraldi. Sete died in 1987. Ocean Memories was recorded in 1972 with unreleased song during the recording of Ocean. The Navy Swings with Vince Guaraldi were recorded radio shows for the U.S. Navy in 1965.
- Many of Jaco Pastorius' work with various artists and Weather Report have been released since his death in 1987. His album The Birthday Concert (1995) was recorded live in 1981.
- Many live albums by zydeco accordionist and singer Clifton Chenier were released after his death from diabetes-related kidney disease in December 1987.
- Argentine alternative rock band Sumo's final album Fiebre, which was recorded between 1981 and 1987, was released in 1989, two years after Luca Prodan was found dead in the room he rented in the boarding house.
  - Prodan's first posthumous solo album Time Fate Love, which was recorded between 1981 and 1983, was released in 1996, nine years after his death.
  - His second posthumous solo album Perdedores Hermosos, which was also recorded between 1981 and 1983, was released in 1997, ten years after his death.
- Pete Drake was featured playing pedal steel guitar on Ringo Starr's instrumental song "Nashville Jam", recorded in 1970 and released as a bonus track on his album Beaucoups of Blues on May 1, 1995, almost seven years after his death from emphysema and congestive heart failure.
  - He was also featured on George Harrison's song "I Live for You", recorded in 1970, overdubbed in 2000, and released as a bonus track on the 30th anniversary reissue of All Things Must Pass on January 22, 2001, almost 13 years after his death.
- All of Alexander Bashlachev's work was released after he committed suicide in 1988. His first album, Time of Bells was released in 1989.
- Divine died in 1988, followed by the release of The Best Of and the Rest Of (1989) (compilation), 12 Inch Collection (1993) (compilation), Born To Be Cheap (1995) (live), Shoot Your Shot (1995), The Originals and the Remixes (1996) (2-CD compilation), and The Best of Divine (1997) (compilation).
- Red Hot Chili Peppers guitarist Hillel Slovak died in 1988 of a drug overdose. He appears on the band's cover of the Jimi Hendrix song "Fire" on the 1989 album Mother's Milk.
- Argentine singer-songwriter Federico Moura died in 1988 from AIDS-related complications. Months before he died, he recorded two songs from Leda Valladares' two folklore compilation albums Grito en el Cielo, volumes 1 (1989) and 2 (1990), "A Mí Me Dicen el Tonto" and "En Atamisqui", both with Daniel Sbarra, both members of the band Virus.
  - Virus' album Tierra del Fuego was released in March 1989, three months after Moura's death. Although he did not participate in the album, he co-wrote two songs: "Un amor inhabitado" and "Lanzo y escucho".
  - Virus' live album Vivo 2, which was recorded in May 1986, was released on April 29, 1997, nine years and four months after Moura's death.
- Many of Roy Buchanan's albums Early Years (1989, Krazy Kat), Sweet Dreams: The Anthology (1992, Polydor) and many others were released after Buchanan committed suicide in a prison in 1988.
- Roy Orbison's album Mystery Girl was released on January 31, 1989, a month after his death.
  - The music video for his song "You Got It", which features footage of his performance at the Diamond Awards Festival in Antwerp, Belgium, in 1988, was released a few months later.
  - Nine months later, his live album entitled A Black & White Night Live was released on October 23, 1989.
  - The album King of Hearts was released on October 20, 1992, four years after his death.
  - One of the Lonely Ones was released on December 4, 2015, almost 27 years after his death.
  - The compilation album A Love So Beautiful featuring The Royal Philharmonic Orchestra was released on November 3, 2017, about 28 years after his death.
- Joe Raposo died from Lymphoma in 1989, his final song for Sesame Street, Let's Make a Dream, was included on the Sesame Street environmental album We Are All Earthlings, which was released in 1993, four years after his death. The song was recorded in 1988.
- Echo & the Bunnymen's drummer Pete de Freitas died in a motorcycle accident in 1989. He appears on BBC Radio 1 Live in Concert (1992), and Crystal Days: 1979–1999 (2001).
- B. W. Stevenson's Rainbow Down the Road (1990, Amazing Records) was released two years after Stevenson died during heart surgery.
- Keith Whitley's album I Wonder Do You Think of Me was released on August 1, 1989, Three months after his death from an alcohol overdose.
  - The compilation album called Kentucky Bluebird was released on September 10, 1991, Two years after his death.
  - Keith Whitley: A Tribute Album was released on September 27, 1994, Five years after his death.
  - The album Wherever You Are Tonight was released on October 24, 1995, Six years after his death.
  - His last album entitled Sad Songs & Waltzes was released on September 12, 2000, Eleven years after his death.

=== 1990s ===
- Mother Love Bone's sole album Apple was released on August 14, 1990, nearly five months after lead singer Andrew Wood's death in March earlier that year.
  - The Love Bone Earth Affair, the video album by Mother Love Bone, was released in 1993, three years after Wood's death.
  - Malfunkshun's debut album Return to Olympus, which was recorded between 1986 and 1987, was released on July 18, 1995, three years after Wood's death.
  - On Earth As It Is was released on November 4, 2016, 26 years after Wood's death.
- Sarah Vaughan released many live albums since 1991, a year after her death from lung cancer.
- Grateful Dead's keyboardist Brent Mydland was featured in many of the Dead's albums after his death in 1990. He was featured on Without a Net (1990), Infrared Roses (1991), and many other live albums.
- Soviet-Korean band Kino released their final album Kino or "Чёрный альбом" on December 1990, four months after Viktor Tsoi's death in August.
  - The Last Recordings or "Последние записи" was released in 2002, Twelve years after his death.
  - The song Ataman or "Атаман" was released on what would have been Viktor's 50th Birthday, 22 years after his death.
- Brazilian singer Cazuza's final album Por aí, which was recorded in 1989 (all but one song recorded in 1986), was released in 1991, a year after his death from AIDS.
  - Barão Vermelho's live album Barão Vermelho Ao Vivo, which was recorded live at Rock in Rio in 1985, was released in 1992, two years after Cazuza's death.
  - His live album O Poeta Está Vivo – Ao Vivo no Teatro Ipanema 1987 was released in 2005, 15 years after his death.
  - 17 years later, O Tempo Não Para (Show Completo) was released on April 4, 2022, the day he would have turned 64. It's an updated version of the album originally released in 1988 and contains many previously unreleased live songs.
- The song "Where Is Love" by Mel and Kim was released in 2018. Mel Appleby died in 1990 from pneumonia while battling cancer.
- Tom Fogerty's album Sidekicks with Randy Oda was released in 1992, two years after his death in 1990 from tuberculosis.
  - He was featured in Merl Saunders' album entitled Fire Up Plus which was released on July 9, 1992, also two years after his death.
  - His compilation album The Very Best of Tom Fogerty was released on July 27, 1999, nine years after his death.
  - He was featured in Creedence Clearwater Revival's box set called CCR: Box Set it was released on October 2, 2001, 11 years after his death.
  - He was also featured in Creedence Clearwater Revival's live album entitled At the Royal Albert Hall it was released on September 16, 2022, 32 years after his death.
- Steve Marriott's work was released. Also albums he did with Small Faces and Humble Pie.
- Stevie Ray Vaughan's albums Family Style (1990), The Sky Is Crying (1991), and In the Beginning (1992) were released after his death in a helicopter crash in 1990.
- Del Shannon's album Rock On! was released on October 1, 1991, A Year after his death.
  - Home and Away was released on October 30, 2006, Sixteen years after his death.
  - The Dublin Sessions was released on July 7, 2017, 27 years after his death.
- Steve Clark wrote songs and did demos for Def Leppard's 1992 album Adrenalize, which was released a year after his death.
- Miles Davis' released his last studio album entitled Doo-Bop on June 30, 1992, nine months after his death. Many live albums have been released since his death.
  - The soundtrack album of the movie Dingo composed by both Miles Davis and Michel Legrand was released on November 5, 1991, almost two months after Miles' death.
  - His live album Bitches Brew Live was released on February 8, 2011, almost 20 years after his death.
  - Rubberband was released on September 6, 2019, almost 28 years after his death.
- Kiss' Eric Carr appears on backing vocals on "God Gave Rock 'n' Roll to You II", and drums on "Carr Jam 1981" on Revenge (1992). Carr died of heart cancer in 1991.
  - His first posthumous album Rockology was released on October 19, 1999, almost eight years after his death.
  - His second posthumous album Unfinished Business, which was recorded in the 80s, was released on November 8, 2011, almost 20 years after his death.
- Freddie Mercury solo albums The Freddie Mercury Album and The Great Pretender were both released in 1992 a year after his death from AIDS-related bronchopneumonia. Mercury also had other albums released later on.
  - Queen's live album Live at Wembley '86 was released on May 26, 1992, six months after Freddie's death.
  - Made in Heaven was released on November 6, 1995, four years after Freddie's death.
  - The box set The Solo Collection was released on October 23, 2000, almost nine years after his death.
  - Queen on Fire – Live at the Bowl was released on October 25, 2004, almost thirteen years after Freddie's death.
  - Queen Rock Montreal was released on October 29, 2007, almost sixteen years after Freddie's death.
  - All of Queen's studio albums were re-released as remastered deluxe editions in 2011 that feature previously unreleased songs in Bonus EPs.
  - Hungarian Rhapsody was released on September 20, 2012, almost 21 years after Freddie's death.
  - Live at the Rainbow '74 was released on September 8, 2014, almost 23 years after Freddie's death.
  - Two months later, both "Let Me in Your Heart Again" and "There Must Be More to Life Than This" (with Michael Jackson) were released for the album Queen Forever, which was released on November 10, 2014, almost 23 years after Freddie's death, and five years after Jackson's death.
  - A Night at the Odeon was released on November 20, 2015, almost 24 years after Freddie's death.
  - On Air was released on November 6, 2016, almost 25 years after Freddie's death.
  - The recording of their Live Aid performance was featured in Bohemian Rhapsody soundtrack, which was released on October 19, 2018, almost 27 years after Freddie's death.
  - The box set Never Boring was released on October 11, 2019, almost 28 years after his death.
  - Queen released The Miracle Collector's Edition featuring the song Face It Alone and 5 other unreleased demos was released on November 18, 2022, almost 31 years after Freddie's death.
- Canadian guitarist Paul Hackman of Helix is featured on Half-Alive (1998), Deep Cuts: The Best Of (1999), B-Sides (1999), and Live! in Buffalo (2001). Hackman died in a car accident in 1992.
- American experimental musician Arthur Russell released an album entitled The World of Arthur Russell was released on January 26, 2004, almost 12 years after his death.
  - Two months later, Calling Out of Context was released on March 16, 2004.
  - Picture of Bunny Rabbit an album recorded between 1985-1986 was released on June 23, 2023, 31 years after his death.
- Bolivian Andean folk band Los Kjarkas' album Hermanos was released in 1993, a year after Ulises Hermosa's death from leukemia. He wrote a song "Papá Estrella" and composed a song "Hermanos".
  - A los 500 Años was released in 1994, two years after Hermosa's death. He wrote a song "Niños de América".
  - El Líder de los Humildes was released in 1998, four years after Hermosa's death. He wrote a song "Al Partir".
  - Lección de Vida was released in 2001, nine years after Hermosa's death. He wrote a song "Te Llevas Todo Amor".
  - 35 Años was released in 2006, 14 years after Hermosa's death. He wrote a song "Mi Vida sin Tu Amor".
  - 40 Años Después... was released in 2012, 20 years after Hermosa's death. He wrote a song "Llévame".
- Toto's album Kingdom of Desire was released on September 7, 1992, almost a month after Jeff Porcaro's death.
  - He also played in Bruce Springsteen's songs "Sad Eyes" and "Trouble River" from the compilation album 18 Tracks, released on April 13, 1999, six years after his death.
- 7 Year Bitch released their first album Sick 'Em after co-founder and guitarist Stefanie Sargent died of a drug overdose.
- Since Albert King's death many albums have been released, including with Blues at Sunset (1993) and In Session (1999) with Stevie Ray Vaughan.
- Conway Twitty's album Final Touches (1993) was released two months after his death from an aneurysm.
- Heaven and Hull (1994), Just Like This (1999), Showtime (1999), Indian Summer (2001) by Mick Ronson were released after his death in 1993. He is also featured on albums by David Bowie, Bob Dylan, Ian Hunter and Elton John.
- Mayhem's debut album De Mysteriis Dom Sathanas was released in May 24 1994, Four years after the suicide of vocalist Dead in April 1991 and A Year after the murder of Euronymous in 1993.
  - The infamous bootleg live album called The Dawn Of The Black Hearts was released on February 17, 1995, Five years after Dead's passing and Two years after Euronymous' death.
- GG Allin's Brutality and Bloodshed for All was released three months after his death in 1993 from a drug overdose.
  - A few months later, the EP Layin' Up with Linda, comprising his final recordings, was released.
- Badlands released their album Dusk on December 15, 1998, five years after vocalist Ray Gillen's death in 1993 from AIDS-related complications.
  - The Self-Titled Album of Sun Red Sun was released in 1995, nearly two years after Gillen's death.
  - The deluxe edition of Black Sabbath's album The Eternal Idol, which features the earlier recording sessions, was released in 2010, nearly 17 years after Gillen's death.
- Molly Drake's songs "Poor Mum" and "Do You Ever Remember?" were featured on her son Nick Drake's compilation album, Family Tree, which was released on July 9, 2007, 14 years after her death.
  - Drake's Self-Titled Compilation Album, which contains recordings made during 1950s at the family home, was released on March 5, 2013, nearly 20 years after her death.
- Puerto Rican salsa singer Héctor Lavoe's album The Master & The Protege was completed with sound-alike Van Lester, and was released on December 7, 1993, five months after he died from a complication of AIDS.
- The Gits' album Enter: The Conquering Chicken was released on March 22, 1994, A Year after lead singer Mia Zapata was murdered.
  - The album Kings & Queens was released on June 11, 1996, Almost three years after her death.
  - The compilation album enttitled Seafish Louisville was released on September 25, 2000, Seven years and two months after her death.
- Ghanaian percussionist Rocky Dzidzornu was featured on the songs "Sunshine of Your Love" and "Crying Blue Rain" by Jimi Hendrix from the album Valleys of Neptune, which was released on March 5, 2010, almost seventeen years after his death.
- California rapper Charizma released his collaborative album Big Shots with Peanut Butter Wolf on November 18, 2003, ten years after his death.
  - Big Shots Bonus EP was released on June 2004, eleven years after his death.
- Rob "The Bass Thing" Jones of The Wonder Stuff appeared on Construction for the Modern Idiot released a month after he died of a sudden heart attack. The album reached No. 4 in the UK.
- Frank Zappa's album Civilization Phaze III was released on October 31, 1994, Ten months after his death of prostate cancer in 1993. Also multiple album re-issues and boxsets from his solo work and his work with The Mothers Of Invention were released after his death.
  - The Lost Episodes was released on February 27, 1996, Three years after his death.
  - Seven months later, the live album called Läther was released on September 24, 1996.
  - The compilation album entitled Have I Offended Someone? was released on April 8, 1997, Four years after his death.
  - Mystery Disc was released on September 14, 1998, Five years after his death.
  - The album Everything Is Healing Nicely was released on December 21, 1999, Six years after his death.
  - The live album entitled FZ:OZ was released on August 16, 2002, Nine years after his death.
  - Another live album Halloween was released on February 4, 2003, Ten years after his death.
  - Joe's Corsage was released on May 30, 2004, Eleven years after his death.
  - Four months later Quaudiophiliac was released on September 14, 2004.
  - The compilation album entitled Joe's Xmasage was released on December 21, 2005, Twelve years after his death.
  - Trance-Fusion was released on October 24, 2006, Thirteen years after his death.
  - Two months later, The MOFO Project/Object was released on December 5, 2006.
  - The Dub Room Special! was released on August 24, 2007, Fourteen years after his death.
  - Two months later, the live album entitled Wazoo was released on October 30, 2007.
  - The live album entitled Joe's Menage was released on October 1, 2008, Fifteen years after his death.
  - The Lumpy Money Project/Object was released on January 23, 2009, Sixteen years after his death.
  - Almost a year later, Philly '76 was released on December 21, 2009.
  - Hammersmith Odeon was released on November 6, 2010, Seventeen years after his death.
  - The album Feeding The Monkies At Ma Maison was released on September 22, 2011, Eighteen years after his death.
  - A Month later, the live album entitled Carnegie Hall was released on October 31, 2011.
  - Road Tapes, Venue 1 was released on October 31, 2012, Nineteen years after his death.
  - On the same day, The compilation album entitled Understanding America was released on October 31, 2012.
  - Two months later, Finer Moments was released on December 18, 2012.
  - Road Tapes, Venue 2 was released on October 31, 2013, Twenty years after his death.
  - The compilation album called Joe's Camouflage was released on January 30, 2014, 21 years after his death.
  - The album Dance Me This was released on June 21, 2015, 22 years after his death.
  - Road Tapes, Venue 3 was released on May 27, 2016, 23 years after his death.
  - Six months later, His 3-Disc compilation album entitled Meat Light was released on November 4, 2016.
  - Halloween '77 was released on October 31, 2017, 24 years after his death.
  - The live album The Roxy Performances was released on February 2, 2018, 25 years after his death.
  - The Hot Rats Sessions Boxset was released on December 20, 2019, 26 years after his death.
  - Halloween '81 was released on October 2, 2020, 27 years after his death.
  - The live album entitled Zappa '88: The Last U.S. Show was released on June 18, 2021, 28 years after his death.
  - Zappa '75: Zagreb/Ljubljana was released on October 14, 2022, 29 years after his death.
  - Two months later, the Waka/Wazoo box set was released on December 16, 2022.
  - The album Funky Nothingness was released on June 30, 2023, Thirty years after his death.
  - Whisky a Go Go 1968 was released on June 21, 2024, 31 years after his death.
  - The live album Zappa '66 Vol. 1 was released on May 15, 2026, 33 years after his death.
- Keep the Fire Burnin' (1994) by Dan Hartman was released nine months after his death.
- Nirvana's live album MTV Unplugged in New York was released on November 1, 1994, seven months after Kurt Cobain's death on April 5th of the same year.
  - Two weeks later, Live! Tonight! Sold Out!! was released on November 15, 1994.
  - From the Muddy Banks of the Wishkah was released on October 1, 1996, two years after his death.
  - Their Self-Titled Greatest Hits Album featuring the song You Know You're Right, recorded on January 30, 1994, at Robert Lang Studios during their final studio session was finally released on October 29, 2002, Eight years after Cobain's death.
  - The box set With the Lights Out featuring unreleased demos, outtakes and live tracks was released on November 23, 2004, Ten years after Kurt's death.
  - The compilation album Sliver: The Best of the Box was released on November 1, 2005, eleven years after his death.
  - Live at Reading was released on November 2, 2009, fifteen years after Kurt's death.
  - A day later, The 20th Anniversary Deluxe Edition of their debut studio album Bleach was released on November 3, 2009, featuring Nirvana's unreleased live performance at The Pine Street Theatre in 1990.
  - Live at the Paramount was released on September 24, 2011, Seventeen years after Cobain's death.
  - Live and Loud was released on September 23, 2013, nineteen years after Kurt's death.
  - Two months later, The 2013 Mix of In Utero was released on November 22, 2013.
  - The release of the single Pennyroyal Tea was cancelled due to Cobain's death in April 1994, the song was finally re-released on Record Store Day '14 (April 19, 2014), 20 years after Cobain's death.
  - The soundtrack album of the documentary Montage Of Heck featuring Kurt's personal cassettes including spoken word, demos, covers and full songs was released on November 13, 2015, 21 years after Kurt's death.
- Hole's Kristen Pfaff was featured on one track of My Body, the Hand Grenade three years after her death.
- American tenor saxophone player Lee Allen was featured in the album Southern Child by Little Richard, which was recorded in 1972 and released in January 2005 as part of the Complete Reprise Recordings box set, ten years after his death from lung cancer.
- American jazz and jazz fusion guitarist Eric Gale's final album Utopia, which was recorded in 1991, was released on May 25, 1998, exactly four years after his death from lung cancer.
- Carmen McRae's live album entitled For Lady Day Vol.1 was released on March 14, 1995, Five months after her death.
  - Seven months later, For Lady Day Vol.2 was released on October 24, 1995.
  - Her final studio album Dream of Life was released on September 29, 1998, Four years after her death.
- A Future to This Life: Robocop – The Series Soundtrack by Joe Walsh and various artists features Nicky Hopkins who died a few months before its release.
- Vivian Stanshall who died in 1995. His singles "Blind Date", "11 Moustachioed Daughters" b/w "The Strain", and "Cyborg Signal" were released in 2016.
- Dreaming of You, the only English album by Selena, was released on July 18, 1995, four months after her murder by Yolanda Saldívar.
  - Siempre Selena was released on October 29, 1996, a year after her death.
  - The live album entitled Selena LIVE! The Last Concert was released on March 27, 2001, five years after her death.
  - Momentos Intimos was released on March 23, 2004, almost nine years after her death. It features two re-recorded songs and an unreleased song "Puede Ser", which is a duet with Nando "Guero" Dominguez, recorded two weeks before her death.
  - Enamorada de Ti was released on April 3, 2012, sixteen years after her death.
  - The remix album called Moonchild Mixes was released on August 26, 2022, 26 years after her death.
- Rory Gallagher's live album BBC Sessions was released in 1999, four years after he died of an infection in 1995.
  - His album Wheels Within Wheels was released on March 10, 2003, eight years after his death.
  - Eight months later, Meeting with the G-Man was released on November 22, 2003.
  - Live at Montreux was released on July 31, 2006, eleven years after his death.
  - His double album entitled Notes from San Francisco was released on May 17, 2011, sixteen years after his death.
- Phyllis Hyman's album I Refuse to Be Lonely was released on November 21, 1995, five months after her death.
  - Forever with You was released on July 28, 1998, three years after her death.
- Canadian electronic musician Dwayne Goettel of Skinny Puppy appeared in many of their albums like The Process (1996) and Puppy Gristle (2002). Goettel died of a drug overdose in 1995.
- Velvet Underground's Sterling Morrison is on Peel Slowly and See a month after he died, Bootleg Series Volume 1: The Quine Tapes (2001), and The Complete Matrix Tapes (2015). Also he appeared on bandmate's John Cale's Antártida (1995) and Stainless Gamelan (2002).
- Harry Nilsson's album Losst and Founnd was released on November 22, 2019, 25 years after his death from a heart attack in 1994.
- Eazy-E's album Str8 off tha Streetz of Muthaphukkin Compton was released on January 30, 1996, eight months after his death from AIDS.
  - His Posthumous EP entitled Impact of a Legend was released on March 26, 2002, exactly seven years after his death.
- Chilean rock band La Ley's album Invisible was released on July 28, 1995, a year and three months after Andrés Bobe's death from a motorcycle accident. Although he did not participate in the album, he co-wrote four songs: "Animal", "El Duelo", "R&R" and "1-800 Dual".
- Many of Jerry Garcia's albums were released with The Grateful Dead and Jerry Garcia Band's How Sweet It Is (1997) and many others.
- John Kahn did an album with Jerry Garcia Pure Jerry: Marin Veterans Memorial Auditorium, San Rafael, California, February 28, 1986 (2009). Kahn died in 1996 from a heart attack.
- Jerry Garcia and John Kahn's Garcia Live Volume 14 was released on July 24, 2020. The album was recorded live in 1986. Garcia died in 1995 and Kahn died in 1996.
- Antonio Brasileiro and Tom Jobim were both released after Antonio Carlos Jobim's death from cardiac arrest on December 8, 1994.
- Chic's Bernard Edwards appeared on the band's Live at the Budokan (1999) and The Power Station's Living in Fear just seven months after died of pneumonia.
- Blind Melon's compilation album Nico was released on November 12, 1996, A Year after Shannon Hoon's death from a cocaine overdose.
  - The Best of Blind Melon was released on September 27, 2005, Almost ten years after Shannon's death.
  - Live at the Palace, a live album recorded ten days before Hoon's passing was finally released on April 4, 2006, Eleven years after his death.
  - The 20th anniversary edition of their Self-Titled Album featuring 5 bonus tracks including songs from The Sippin' Time Sessions EP. it was released on April 16, 2013, Eighteen years after Shannon's death.
  - Screamin' at the Sun was released on iTunes in 2015, Twenty years after Shannon's death. The live album was recorded in New York in 1993.
- Mexican singer Lola Beltrán's final album Las Tres Señoras featuring Amalia Mendoza and Lucha Villa was released in 1996 after her death from a pulmonary embolism.
- Argentine cumbia singer Gilda's first posthumous album Entre el Cielo y la Tierra was released on April 7, 1997, seven months after her death from a car accident.
  - Her second posthumous album La Más Grande was released in 1998, two years after her death.
  - Her final album Las Alas del Alma was released on March 2, 1999, three years and a half after her death.
- The Self-Titled Album from California ska group Sublime was released on July 30, 1996, two months after lead singer Bradley Nowell's death.
  - The compilation album called Second-Hand Smoke was released on November 11, 1997, a year and six months after his death.
  - The live album called Stand by Your Van was released on June 23, 1998, two years after his death.
  - Five months later, Sublime Acoustic: Bradley Nowell & Friends was released on November 17, 1998.
  - The box set called Everything Under the Sun was released on November 14, 2006, ten years after his death.
  - 3 Ring Circus - Live at The Palace was released on June 1, 2013, seventeen years after his death.
- Kevin Gilbert's live album Live at the Troubadour was released on September 9, 1999, Three years after his death from autoerotic asphyxiation.
  - His concept album The Shaming of the True was released in February 13, 2000, Four years after his death.
  - The albums Nuts and Bolts were both released simultaneously in October 19, 2009, Thirteen years after his death.
- British drummer Mathew Fletcher was featured on Heavenly's Operation Heavenly a few months after he committed suicide in 1996. He is also featured on Talulah Gosh's single "Demos EP" (2011) and the album Was It Just a Dream? (2013).
- Jason Thirsk appears on Humble Gods' album No Heroes (1996) a few months after his 1996 accidental suicide while he was drunk. He also appears on Pennywise's Full Circle (1997), and Yesterdays (2014).
- Tupac Shakur's first and only album under the name "Makaveli" called The Don Killuminati: The 7 Day Theory was released on November 5, 1996, Two months after his murder in September.
  - The double album entitled R U Still Down? (Remember Me) was released on November 25, 1997, A Year after his death.
  - His Greatest Hits album featuring 4 previously unreleased tracks was released on November 24, 1998, Two years after his death.
  - His collaboration album with his group Outlawz called Still I Rise was released on December 21, 1999, Three years after his death.
  - Until the End of Time was released on March 27, 2001, Five years after his death.
  - Nine months later, his only collaborative EP under the name "Makaveli" entitled Don't Go 2 Sleep featuring Daz Dillinger was released on December 24, 2001.
  - His last double album called Better Dayz was released on November 26, 2002, Six years after his death.
  - His remix album Nu-Mixx Klazzics was released on October 7, 2003, Seven years after his death.
  - A month later. The soundtrack album to the documentary called Tupac: Resurrection was released on November 11, 2003.
  - 2Pac Live was released on August 10, 2004, Eight years after his death.
  - Four months later, Loyal to the Game was released on December 14, 2004.
  - Live at the House of Blues was released on September 5, 2005, Nine years after his death.
  - His last album called Pac's Life was released on November 21, 2006, Ten years after his death.
  - Nu-Mixx Klazzics Vol. 2 was released on August 14, 2007, Eleven years after his death.
- Colleen Peterson's Postcards from California was released in 2004 eight years after she died of cancer.
- Seagram's album Souls on Ice was released on August 12, 1997, a year after his death.
- Eva Cassidy's debut solo album entitled Eva by Heart was released on September 23, 1997, over ten months after her death from melanoma in 1996.
  - Time After Time was released on June 20, 2000, four years after her death.
  - Imagine was released on August 20, 2002, six years after her death.
  - The album called American Tune containing her rehearsal tapes and live recordings was released on August 12, 2003, seven years after her death.
  - Somewhere was released on August 26, 2008, twelve years after her death.
  - Her last studio album called Simply Eva was released on January 25, 2011, fifteen years after her death.
  - The live album entitled Nightbird was released on November 13, 2015, nineteen years after her death.
  - The album called I Can Only Be Me featuring The London Symphony Orchestra was released on March 3, 2023, 27 years after her death.
- Townes Van Zandt's work A Far Cry from Dead (1999), Texas Rain: The Texas Hill Country Recordings (2001), In the Beginning (2003), Sunshine Boy: The Unheard Studio Sessions & Demos 1971–1972 (2013), Sky Blue (2019), and Somebody Had to Write It (2020). All released after he died suddenly in 1997.
- Billy MacKenzie of The Associates appears on The Glamour Chase (2002). Many solo albums like Beyond the Sun (1997), Eurocentric (2001) and Transmission Impossible (2005) were all released. He died by suicide in 1997.
- Jermaine Stewart's album Attention was released on November 15, 2005, Eight years after his death in 1997.
- The Notorious B.I.G.'s album Life After Death was released on March 25, 1997, Two weeks after his murder.
  - Born Again was released on December 7, 1999, almost two years after his death.
  - The remix album entitled Duets: The Final Chapter was released on December 20, 2005, eight years after his death.
  - His Greatest Hits album was released on March 6, 2007, ten years after his death.
  - The collaborative album called The King & I featuring Faith Evans was released on May 19, 2017, twenty years after his death.
- Jeff Buckley's album Sketches for My Sweetheart the Drunk was released on May 26, 1998, a year after his death in 1997.
  - The live album entitled Mystery White Boy was released on May 9, 2000, three years after his death
  - Live À L'Olympia was released on July 3, 2001, four years after his death.
  - His collaborative album with Gary Lucas entitled Songs to No One was released on October 15, 2002, five years after his death.
  - The Legacy Edition re-issue of his album Grace featuring eight unreleased studio tracks was released exactly ten years after its original release on August 23, 2004, seven years after his death.
  - Grace Around the World was released on June 2, 2009, twelve years after his death.
  - The compilation album entitled You and I, was released on March 11, 2016, almost nineteen years after his death.
- Johnny Copeland's albums The Crazy Cajun Recordings (1998) and Honky Tonkin (1999), both released after he died from complications of heart surgery.
- Much of Pakistani musician Nusrat Fateh Ali Khan's work was released after his death in 1997. His remix album Star Rise was released a year later.
  - Chain of Light was released on 20 September 2024, after being rediscovered in 2021 at Real World Records.
- Luther Allison's Live in Chicago (1999), Standing at the Crossroad (1999), Pay It Forward (2002), Underground (2007), and Songs from the Road (2009). He died in 1997.
- Paul Delph's final album A God That Can Dance, which was privately released in 1996, was released commercially in 2003, seven years after his death.
- Nigeria's Fela Kuti work was released after he died from AIDS in 1997. Albums The Underground Spiritual Game (2004), Live in Detroit, 1986 (2012) and many others were released.
- Brazilian rock band Legião Urbana's final album Uma Outra Estação was released on July 18, 1997, nine months after Renato Russo's death from AIDS.
  - Russo's first posthumous solo album O Último Solo was released in October 1997, a year after his death.
  - His second posthumous solo album Presente was released on March 27, 2003, six years and five months after his death.
- Laura Nyro's album Angel in the Dark was released on March 20, 2001, four years after her death in 1997.
  - Her box set American Dreamer was released on September 3, 2021, 24 years after her death.
- Glen Buxton, founding member of the original Alice Cooper band, was featured on the album Rock Legends from the Original Alice Cooper Group, which was recorded live on Houston, Texas, on October 12, 1997, was released in 2000, three years after his death from complications of pneumonia.
  - He was also featured on the songs "What Happened to You" and "Return of the Spiders 2025" from the album The Revenge of Alice Cooper, which was released on July 25, 2025, almost 18 years after his death.
- INXS frontman Michael Hutchence released his Self-Titled Album on December 14, 1999, two years after his death of suicide by hanging in 1997.
  - INXS' EP entitled Bang the Drum was released on August 14, 2004, seven years after Hutchence's death.
  - The first posthumous live album Live at Barker Hangar, which was recorded live on May 8, 1993, was released on October 4, 2005, eight years after Hutchence's death.
  - The seconds posthumous live album Live at Wembley Stadium 1991 was released on February 7, 2014, over 16 years after Hutchence's death.
  - The 30th Anniversary Reissue of INXS' sixth studio album Kick features unreleased demos, outtakes and live tracks. It was released on November 24, 2017, over twenty years after his death.
  - The soundtrack album to the documentary called Mystify: Michael Hutchence was released on July 5, 2019, 22 years after his death.
  - The third posthumous live album Live at the US Festival 1983 (Shabooh Shoobah) was released on October 28, 2022, almost 25 years after Hutchence's death.
  - The fourth posthumous live album Live from Royal Albert Hall, London, 1986 was released on November 28, 2025, 28 years after Hutchence's death.
- Blues musician Junior Kimbrough's first posthumous album God Knows I Tried was released a few months after his death from a heart attack on January 17, 1998.
  - A year later, his second posthumous album Meet Me in the City, which was recorded between 1992 and 1996, was released.
  - His third posthumous album First Recordings, which was recorded in 1966, was released in 2009, eleven years after his death.
- Austrian pop star Falco released his album Out of the Dark (Into the Light) on February 27, 1998, three weeks after his death from traffic collision.
  - The first posthumous music video for his song "Out of the Dark" was released in 1998.
  - The second posthumous music video for his song "Egoist" was also released in 1998.
  - The third posthumous music video for his song "Push! Push!" was released in 1999.
  - The fourth posthumous music video for his song "Verdammt wir leben noch" was also released in 1999.
  - The album Verdammt wir leben noch was released in February 1999, a year after his death.
  - The Spirit Never Dies was released on December 4, 2009, almost twelve years after his death.
- Brazilian comedy rock band Mamonas Assassinas compilation album Atenção, Creuzebek: A Baixaria Continua was released in 1998, two years after their death from a plane crash on March 2, 1996.
  - Their live album Mamonas Ao Vivo was released in 2006, ten years after their death.
- Brazilian sertanejo duo Leandro e Leonardo's final album Um Sonhador was released on July 15, 1998, nearly a month after Leandro's death from multiple organ dysfunction syndrome.
- Israel Kamakawiwoʻole's live album IZ in Concert: The Man and His Music was released on October 1, 1998, a year after his death in 1997 from respiratory failure.
  - Alone in IZ World was released on September 18, 2001, Four years after his death.
- Rozz Williams with Christian Death and Shadow Project's albums. His first live album Live in Berlin was released in 2000.
- Drummer Cozy Powell's album Especially for You was released in 1999, a year after his death.
- Rich Mullins' album The Jesus Record was released on July 21, 1998, ten months after his death in 1997.
  - Here in America was released on May 6, 2003, six years after his death.
- John Denver's album Forever, John was released on September 29, 1998, a year after he died in a plane crash in 1997.
  - Christmas in Concert in September 2001, four years after his death. Many live albums have been released.
- Michael Hedges' album Torched was released on February 9, 1999, a year and two months after his death.
- Southern rapper Fat Pat released his album Ghetto Dreams on March 17, 1998, a month after his death.
  - A month later, Throwed in da Game was released on April 7, 1998.
  - I Had a Ghetto Dream was released on November 4, 2008, ten years after his death.
- Linda McCartney's only album Wide Prairie was released on October 26, 1998, Six months after she died of cancer.
  - McCartney appears on many album re-issues by Paul McCartney and Wings since her death.
- Junior Wells albums Every Day I Have the Blues with Buddy Guy (2000), Live at Theresa's 1975 (2006) and many others were released.
- Indian musician Ananda Shankar's album Walking On (with State of Bengal) was released on September 12, 1999, a year and nearly six months after his death from cardiac failure.
  - His 2nd posthumous album Arpan (with Suresh Wadkar) was released on November 17, 2000, two years and nearly ten months after his death.
- Zilch's debut album 3.2.1. was released on July 23, 1998, two months after Japanese vocalist Hide's death in May.
  - Hide with Spread Beaver's first and only studio album with Hide entitled Ja, Zoo was released on November 21, 1998, six months after his death.
  - The remix album entitled Bastard Eyes by his US band Zilch was released on March 3, 1999, ten months after his death.
  - He appeared on the album Tribute Spirits via a song called "Celebration" featuring I.N.A, PATA & HEATH (originally performed by X Japan via the album Blue Blood). Both the song and album are released on May 1, 1999, a year after his death.
  - The re-recording of Hide's song Tell Me featuring his band Spread Beaver was released on January 19, 2000, two years after his death.
  - X Japan's live album The Last Live was released on May 5, 2001, three years after his death.
  - His last single In Motion was released on July 10, 2002, four years after his death.
  - The compilation album Singles ~ Junk Story along with the song "Junk Story" was released two weeks later on July 24, 2002.
  - Five months later, he was featured in X Japan's remix album Trance X which was released on December 4, 2002.
  - The compilation album entitled KING OF PSYBORG ROCK STAR along with his rendition of the song "MISCAST" (originally performed by X Japan via the album Jealousy) was released on April 28, 2004, six years after his death.
  - He was featured in X Japan's single "I.V.". It was released on January 23, 2008, nine years and eight months after his death.
  - Two months later, his live album called Psyence a Go Go was released on March 19, 2008.
  - Another live album Hide Our Psychommunity was released a month later on April 23, 2008.
  - Co Gal a song that was finished using Vocaloid Technology to mimic his voice along with its compilation album of the same name was released on December 10, 2014, sixteen years and seven months after his death.
  - He was featured in X Japan's soundtrack album of their documentary entitled We Are X. The album was released on March 3, 2017, almost nineteen years after his death.
  - The compilation album entitled REPSYCLE+ alongside it's box set REPSYCLE THE REPSYCLED was released on July 1, 2026, 28 years after his death.
- Frank Sinatra's live album Live from Las Vegas was released on April 26, 2005, seven years after his death. Also many live albums and box sets were released since his death in 1998.
- Puerto Rican salsa singer Frankie Ruiz's live album Salsa Live Vol. 1 (with Tommy Olivencia), which was recorded live on July 31, 1987, was released on March 7, 2000, a year and nearly seven months after his death due to complications from liver disease.
  - His compilation album Éxitos Eternos was released on 2003, five years after his death. The album features the unreleased track "Que Siga la Fiesta" which was recorded in 1998.
- California session singer Warren Wiebe has been featured on various compilation albums following his suicide in October 1998 as well as several demo recordings.
- Swedish singer-songwriter Björn Afzelius albums Elsinore (1999), Björn Afzelius & Mikael Wiehe 1993 – Malmöinspelningarna (with Mikael Wiehe) (2004), and Tusen bitar – Sånger om kärlek & rättvisa (2011).
- Hip Hop group Lost Boyz released their album LB IV Life on September 28, 1999, six months after Freaky Tah's death.
- Founder of Moby Grape Skip Spence single "Land of the Sun" was released the year he died. Also, he is featured on two albums by Moby Grape The Place and the Time (2009) and Moby Grape Live (2010).
- Rapper Big L was featured on D.I.T.C.'s Self-Titled Debut Album which was released on February 22, 2000, a year after he was shot to death in his neighbourhood; the murder is still unsolved.
  - Six months later his album The Big Picture was released on August 1, 2000.
  - Live from Amsterdam was released in 2003, four years after his death.
  - The compilation album entitled Big L: The Archives 1996–2000 was released on June 28, 2006, seven years after his death.
  - 139 & Lenox was released on August 31, 2010, eleven years after his death.
  - Three months later, Return of the Devil's Son was released on November 23, 2010.
  - The Danger Zone was released on May 31, 2011, twelve years after his death.
  - The compilation album entitled L Corleone was released digitally on February 14, 2012, thirteen years after his death.
  - His last album entitled Harlem's Finest: Return of the King was released on October 31, 2025, 26 years after his death.
- Stéphane Sirkis, member of French band Indochine, died of Hepatitis C while Dancetaria was in pre-production. The album was released nearly six months after his death.
- Dusty Springfield's live album Live at the Royal Albert Hall, which was recorded live in August 1979, was released on October 18, 2005, six years and seven months after her death from breast cancer.
  - Her first posthumous album Faithful, which was recorded in 1971, was released on April 7, 2015, 16 years after her death.
  - Her second posthumous album Longing, which was recorded in 1974, was released on June 6, 2025, 26 years after her death.
- Jackson C. Frank had several compilation albums and a box set released after his death on March 3, 1999, featuring previously unreleased tracks and demos.
- Morphine's final album The Night was released on February 1, 2000, nearly seven months after Mark Sandman's death from a heart attack onstage in Italy.
  - Their live album Bootleg Detroit, which was recorded live in 1994, was released on September 26, 2000, over a year after Sandman's death. A deluxe remastered edition was released in 2025 that includes the full concert.
  - Sandman was featured on Tanya Donelly's song "Moonbeam Monkey" from her album Beautysleep, which was released on February 18, 2002, two years and seven months after his death.
  - Morphine's compilation album The Best of Morphine: 1992–1995 was released on February 18, 2003, three years and seven months after Sandman's death. It features two previously unreleased songs "Jack and Tina" and "Pretty Face".
  - Sandman's posthumous solo album Sandbox: The Music of Mark Sandman was released in November 2004, five years after his death.
  - Treat Her Right's album The Lost Album was released in December 16, 2009, ten years after Sandman's death.
  - A bonus CD from the video album Cure for Pain: The Mark Sandman Story Collector's Edition was released in 2012, thirteen years after Sandman's death.
  - Morphine's live album Live at the Warfield 1997 was released on July 17, 2017, eighteen years after Sandman's death.
- Grover Washington Jr.'s final album Aria was released on March 7, 2000, nearly three months after his death from a heart attack.
- Charles Earland's album entitled Stomp! was released on August 29, 2000, nearly a year after his death from heart failure.
  - His final album entitled If Only for One Night was released on June 18, 2002, two and a half years after his death.
- Tripping Daisy's member Wes Berggren is on the band's last Self-Titled Album was released in 2000 just months after Berggren died of an overdose.
- Canadian musician Rick Danko is featured on many of The Band's live albums since his death in 1999. His solo albums Times Like These (2000), Cryin' Heart Blues (2005) and many others. He is also featured on Richard Manuel's albums and Danko/Fjeld/Andersen's One More Shot (2002) with Jonas Fjeld and Eric Andersen.
- Visual Kei band Malice Mizer released their EP called Shinwa on February 1, 2000, Eight months after their drummer Kami died of Subarachnoid Hemorrhage.
- Scatman John's album Listen to the Scatman was released on December 11, 2001, Two years after his death in 1999.
  - One of his last songs, Can You Hear Me, was released digitally on July 16, 2025, 25 years after his death.

== 21st century ==
=== 2000s ===
- King Ernest's album Blues Got Soul was released on September 26, 2000, Six months after his death in March.
- Raymond Scott's album Manhattan Research Inc. (2000), which contained selected samples of Scott's work from the 1950s and 1960s for film soundtracks, commercials, and for his own technical and musical experiments, was released six years after Scott's death in 1994.
- Israeli musician Ofra Haza's albums Manginat Halev Vol. 1 and 2 (2000 and 2004) and remix album Forever (2008) were released after her death in 2000 from AIDS-related pneumonia.
- Big Pun's album Yeeeah Baby was released on April 4, 2000, two months after he died of a heart attack.
  - He was featured in Jennifer Lopez's music video for her song Feelin' So Good with Fat Joe, which was released months after his death.
  - His single How We Roll featuring Ashanti was released a year after his death.
  - His album Endangered Species was released on April 3, 2001, a year and nearly two months after his death.
- The Mamas & the Papas leader John Phillips released his album entitled Pay Pack & Follow on April 23, 2001, a month after his death from heart failure.
- Puerto Rican Latin jazz and mambo musician Tito Puente's collaborative and final album Masterpiece/Obra maestra (with Eddie Palmieri) was released in July 2000, almost two months after his death from a heart attack.
  - His first posthumous live album Live at the Playboy Jazz Festival, which was recorded live in 1994, was released on May 21, 2002, nearly two years after his death.
  - His second posthumous live album Live in Brussels (with Toots Thielemans) was released on September 28, 2011, eleven years after his death.
- Australian Indie rock band The Whitlams released two singles after the death of bassist Andy Lewis in early 2000: "Blow Up the Pokies" (2000) and "Made Me Hard" (2001).
- Ian Dury was featured in Madness' music video for their song "Drip Fed Fred", which was released months after his death from colorectal cancer on March 27, 2000.
  - Ian Dury & the Blockheads' live album Straight from the Desk, which was recorded on December 23, 1978, was released in 2001, a year after his death.
  - Ten More Turnips from the Tip, which was recorded between 1991 and 2001, was released in 2002, two years after his death.
- Proto-punk band Death's first album ...For the Whole World to See, which was recorded in 1975, was released on February 17, 2009, eight years and four months after David Hackney's death from lung cancer on October 9, 2000.
  - Their second album Spiritual Mental Physical, which was recorded between 1974 and 1976, was released on January 25, 2011, ten years and three months after Hackney's death.
- Chet Atkins's final album Solo Sessions was released in 2003, two years after his death from colon cancer.
- French singer-songwriter Charles Trenet's live album Concert à la Varenne-Saint-Hilaire en 1954 was released on May 27, 2005, four years after his death from a stroke.
  - His final album Je n'irai pas à Notre-Dame, which was recorded between 1994 and 1999, was released on February 12, 2006, almost five years after his death.
- Aaliyah's music video for her song "Rock the Boat" was completed the morning of her death. Nearly two months later, it was released on October 9, 2001.
  - Her compilation album I Care 4 U was released on December 10, 2002, a year and nearly four months after her death. It features six previously unreleased tracks.
- Joey Ramone's debut solo album Don't Worry About Me was released on February 19, 2002, A Year after his death from lymphoma in 2001.
  - Few months later, Dee Dee Ramone died and his collaborative album featuring the band Youth Gone Mad in their Self-Titled Album was released on December 31, 2002, Six months after his death in June.
  - Eight months later, both were featured on Ramones live album NYC 1978 released on August 19, 2003, Two years after Joey's death & A Year after Dee Dee's death.
  - Joey's second solo album ...Ya Know? was released on May 22, 2012, Eleven years after his death.
  - Johnny Ramone is featured on Morrissey Curates The Ramones which was released on November 28, 2014, Ten years after his death in 2004.
- Sludge Metal band Kylesa released their Self-Titled Debut Album on April 2, 2002, Ten months after Brian Duke's death in 2001.
- Brazilian rock band Titãs' album A Melhor Banda de Todos os Tempos da Última Semana was released on October 2001, four months after Marcelo Fromer's death from injuries sustained after being hit by a motorcycle while running. Although he did not participate in the album, he co-wrote five songs: "Bom Gosto", "Um Morto de Férias", "Não Fuja da Dor", "Alma Lavada" and "Cuidado Com Você".
- George Harrison was featured on the song "Horse to the Water" on the album Small World, Big Band by Jools Holland's Rhythm and Blues Orchestra. He died from lung cancer in 2001.
  - Harrison's album Brainwashed was completed by his son Dhani Harrison and producer Jeff Lynne. The album was released in November 2002, one year after his death.
  - The Beatles' remix album entitled Let It Be... Naked was released on November 17, 2003, almost 2 years after Harrison's death, and almost 23 years after John Lennon's death.
  - Early Takes: Volume 1 was released on May 1, 2012, ten years and six months after his death.
  - Harrison appears on many album re-issues by The Beatles since his death.
  - The Beatles' live album Get Back – The Rooftop Performance was released on January 28, 2022, 21 years after Harrison's death, and 42 years after Lennon's death.
- TLC's member Lisa Lopes was featured on the album 3D. It was released on October 10, 2002, just seven months after her death from a car accident.
  - Her solo album Eye Legacy was released on January 27, 2009, almost seven years after her death.
  - Almost 11 months later, Forever... The EP was released on November 3, 2009.
- Brazilian singer Cássia Eller's first posthumous album Dez de Dezembro was released on December 10, 2002, almost a year after her death from cardiac arrest.
  - Her live album Rock in Rio: Cássia Eller ao Vivo was released in 2006, five years after her death.
  - Her second posthumous album In Blues (with Victor Biglione), which was recorded between 1991 and 1992, was released on December 10, 2022, almost 21 years after her death.
- American folk duo Dave Carter and Tracy Grammer released their album Seven Is the Number on October 17, 2006, four years after Carter's death.
  - A year prior, Tracy Grammer's album Flower of Avalon features nine songs that Carter wrote but never recorded. The album was released on April 26, 2005, three years after his death.
- Josh Clayton-Felt's album Spirit Touches Ground was released on February 12, 2002, two years after his death from choriocarcinoma.
  - His last album Center of Six was released on May 6, 2003, three years after his death.
- Death metal band Death released many live albums since 2005, four years after Chuck Schuldiner's death from a brain tumor on December 13, 2001.
- Waylon Jennings' live album Live from Austin, TX was released on February 21, 2006, Four years after his death in 2002.
  - The live album entitled Never Say Die was released on July 24, 2007, Five years after his death.
  - Waylon Forever was released on October 21, 2008, Six years after his death.
  - The album Goin' Down Rockin': The Last Recordings was released on September 25, 2012, Ten years after his death.
  - The EP Old 97's & Waylon Jennings along with country band Old 97's was released on October 1, 2013, Eleven years after his death.
  - New Stuff was released on November 24, 2017, Fifteen years after his death.
  - The album Songbird was released on October 3, 2025, 23 years after his death.
  - When the Balladeer Met the Dukes was released on April 18, 2026, 24 years after his death.
  - His upcoming album Diamonds will be releasing on November 13, 2026, 24 years after his death and nine years after Glen Campbell's death.
- Snot's live album Alive! was released in July 30, 2002, Four years after Lynn Strait's death in 1998.
- Hong Kong singer and actor Leslie Cheung's album Everything Follows the Wind (一切隨風) was released on July 8, 2003, 3 months and 1 week after his death from suicide on April 1, 2003.
- Cuban salsa singer Celia Cruz released her album Regalo del Alma on July 29, 2003, 13 days after her death from brain cancer.
  - Her song "El Año Viejo" was released in late 2003, some time after her death.
  - Dios Disfrute a la Reina, an unreleased album recorded between 1993 and 1999, was released on July 12, 2004, almost a year after her death.
  - A live recording of the song Bemba Colorá, which was recorded on June 16, 2002, appears on a live album Central Park SummerStage: Live from the Heart of the City by various artists, and was released in 2005, two years after her death.
  - She was featured on Dionne Warwick's album My Friends & Me, in the song Do You Know the Way to San Jose. The album was released on November 7, 2006, three years after her death.
  - The album Havana Nights was released on November 8, 2019, 16 years after her death.
  - The album En Vivo: 100 Años de Azúcar, which contains unreleased live recordings in Miami, Florida, between 1986 and 1987, was released on May 24, 2024, almost 21 years after her death.
  - The album Queen of Salsa: En vivo desde Europa, which was recorded live in Hamburg, Germany, in 1986, will be released on July 16, 2026, exactly 23 years after her death.
- Big Mello's album The Gift was released on July 29, 2002, a month after his death.
  - Done Deal was released on June 15, 2003, exactly a year after his death.
- Mic Christopher's first and only album Skylarkin' was released on November 29, 2002, exactly a year after his death.
- Fingerstyle guitarist John Fahey released his album Red Cross on February 11, 2003, almost two years after his death in 2001.
  - The live album entitled The Great Santa Barbara Oil Slick was released on November 9, 2004, three years and nine months after his death.
  - On Air was released on August 23, 2005, four years after his death.
- Cuban singer and songwriter Polo Montañez's album Memoria was released on June 1, 2004, a year and a half after his death from a car crash.
  - The video album El Guajiro was released on June 21, 2005, two years and a half after his death.
  - His band Grupo Polo Montañez's first album Cuestión de Suerte was released on May 23, 2006, three years and a half after his death. It features some songs written by Montañez.
  - Grupo Polo Montañez's second album Regreso was released on September 4, 2015, almost 13 years after his death. It features two songs written by Montañez.
- Australian children's music group The Wiggles' albums Santa's Rockin'! (2004), Live Hot Potatoes! (2005), and Sailing Around the World (2005) were released after the passing of the late pianist Steve Blau.
- David Ruffin's album David (not to be confused with his self-titled 1973 album) was released in 2004, 13 years after his death in 1991.
- Paul Baloff wrote songs for the album Let There Be Blood (2008) by Exodus.
- Sinema, a video album by Drowning Pool, was released on November 19, 2002, three months after Dave Williams suddenly died of heart failure.
  - The Unlucky 13th Anniversary Edition of their debut album Sinner containing 13 unreleased demos, 7 of which are new songs including both "Soul" and "Heroes Sleeping". The re-issued album was released on November 11, 2014, 12 years after his death.
- Live at Montreux 2001 by Run-DMC featuring Jam Master Jay was released in 2007, four and a half years after Jay was murdered.
- Rick James' video album Rick James at Rockpalast, which was filmed live at Grugahalle in Essen, Germany on April 3, 1982, was released in 2005, a year after his death from cardiac and pulmonary failure.
  - He was featured on the song "In the Ghetto" by Busta Rhymes, which was released in 2006, two years after his death.
  - His last studio album Deeper Still was released in May 15, 2007, three years after his death.
  - He also appears on Neil Young's The Archives Vol. 1 1963–1972 (2009) when he was a member of The Mynah Birds, five years after his death.
  - He produced and wrote all the songs on the album Conversation by Mary Jane Girls, which was recorded in 1986 and released in 2014, ten years after his death.
- Joe Strummer & The Mescaleros's final album Streetcore was released in October 21, 2003, Ten months after Strummer's death.
  - The Hellcat Years was released on August 21, 2012, almost ten years after Strummer's death.
  - Three months later Live at Acton Town Hall was released on November 23, 2012.
  - The compilation album entitled Joe Strummer 001 was released on September 28, 2018, Sixteen years after his death.
- June Carter Cash's album Wildwood Flower was released on September 9, 2003, four months after her death due to complications of a leaky heart valve.
- Johnny Cash's box set entitled Unearthed was released on November 25, 2003, Two months after his death. Also, many live and collaboration albums have been released as well.
  - Four months later, My Mother's Hymn Book was released as standalone album on April 6, 2004.
  - American V: A Hundred Highways was released on July 4, 2006, Three years after his death.
  - American VI: Ain't No Grave was released on February 23, 2010, Seven years after his death.
  - Out Among the Stars, an unreleased album recorded between 1981 and 1984 was released on March 25, 2014, Eleven years after his death. His wife June Carter Cash was also featured in this album on two tracks.
  - Johnny Cash and the R.P.O. was released on November 13, 2020, Seventeen years after his death.
  - Songwriter, an unreleased album recorded in 1993 was released on June 28, 2024, 21 years after his death.
- Jeremy Michael Ward was featured on Omar Rodríguez-López albums A Manual Dexterity: Soundtrack Volume One (2004), Omar Rodriguez Lopez & Jeremy Michael Ward (2008) and Minor Cuts and Scrapes in the Bushes Ahead (2008) were all recorded in 2001. Ward died in May 2003.
- Elliott Smith's final album entitled From a Basement on the Hill was released on October 18, 2004, almost a year after his death in 2003.
  - New Moon was released on May 8, 2007, three years and seven months after his death.
  - The soundtrack album of his documentary called Heaven Adores You featuring his unreleased home recordings was released on February 6, 2016, 12 years and 4 months after his death.
- pre)Thing's first and only album 22nd Century Lifestyle was released on April 6, 2004, A Month after former member of Crazy Town and lead singer of the band Rust Epique died of a sudden heart attack.
- Warren Zevon's Reconsider Me: The Love Songs (2006) and Preludes: Rare and Unreleased Recordings (2007) were released after his death in 2003. Preludes was recorded before 1976.
- Buzz Gardner appears on Frank Zappa's Beat the Boots! III (2009) and Ant-Bee's Electronic Church Muzik (2011).
- Coil's live album ...And the Ambulance Died in His Arms was released in April 2005, a year after John Balance's death in 2004.
  - Eight months later, the album The Ape of Naples was released on December 2, 2005.
  - The New Backwards was released on April 18, 2008, four years after his death.
- Ray Charles' album Genius Loves Company (2004) was released two months after his death. Also albums Genius & Friends (2005), Ray Sings, Basie Swings (2006), and Rare Genius (2010) were released was well.
- Jan & Dean's Carnival of Sound was released in 2010 after Jan Berry died in 2004. It was the duo's last album and was recorded between 1966 and 1968.
- Robert Palmer's Live at the BBC was released in 2010, seven years after his death.
- Laura Branigan's EP Rhino Hi-Five: Laura Branigan was released on September 20, 2005, a year after her death from a cerebral aneurysm.
- Norwegian singer Terje Bakken's compilation album Valfar, ein Windir was released on November 2, 2004, nearly a year after his death.
- Argentine singer-songwriter Pappo's album Juanito y El Carposaurio (with Juanse), which was recorded in 1992, was released on April 30, 2021, 16 years after his death from a motorcycle accident.
  - His live album Vivo Cosquín Rock, which was recorded live in 2005, was released on August 6, 2021, 16 years after his death.
  - His collaborative album with Botafogo (Miguel Vilanova) entitled Blues acústico en El Living, which was recorded in 1998, was released on November 5, 2025, 20 years and 9 months after his death.
- Rebel Meets Rebel, a collaboration album by David Allan Coe and Pantera, was released in May 2005, five months after Pantera guitarist Dimebag Darrell was murdered.
- Ol' Dirty Bastard's album entitled Osirus was released on January 4, 2005, two months after his death in 2004. Also, many albums have been released since and his work with Wu-Tang Clan.
  - A Son Unique was released digitally on June 21, 2005, seven months after his death.
  - His live album Free to Be Dirty! Live was released on August 30, 2005, nine months after his death.
- Drummer Kenny Buttrey appears on Neil Young's The Archives Vol. 1 1963–1972 (2009), Neil Young Archives Volume II: 1972–1976 (2020); Bob Dylan's 50th Anniversary Collection 1969 (2019) and others.
- Long John Baldry's Looking at Long John Baldry: The UA Years 1964–1966 (2006), Live – Iowa State University (2009), and The Best of the Stony Plain Years (2014) were all released after he died in 2005.
- Thrash Metal band Voivod released their album Katorz on July 25, 2006, Almost a year after Denis D'Amour's death in 2005.
  - Infini was released on June 23, 2009, Four years after D'Amour's death.
- Polish drummer Krzysztof Raczkowski is featured on Sweet Noise – The Triptic (2007, as member), Atrocious Filth – Atrocious Filth (2008), and Dies Irae – The Art of an Endless Creation (2009, DVD).
- Chris Whitley albums Reiter In (2006), Dislocation Blues (2007) and On Air (2008) were released after he died from lung cancer in 2005.
- Lou Rawls' live album Live in Concert 1992–95 was released on November 13, 2006, ten months after his death from lung cancer.
- Lynden David Hall's single "Promise" was recorded in 2005 and released in 2013. Hall died of cancer in 2006.
- Colombian-American singer-songwriter Soraya wrote the song "Pedazos" for the deluxe edition of Ha*Ash's album Primera Fila: Hecho Realidad, released on November 13, 2015, nine years after her death from breast cancer.
- Rapper J Dilla released his album The Shining on August 22, 2006, six months after his death due to cardiac arrest.
  - His EP Ruff Draft was re-issued on March 20, 2007, a year after his death.
  - Three months later Jay Love Japan was released on June 26, 2007.
  - Jay Deelicious: The Delicious Vinyl Years was released two months later on August 21, 2007.
  - The album Jay Stay Paid was released on June 2, 2009, three years and four months after his death.
  - The instrumental EP entitled Donut Shop was released on June 11, 2010, four years and four months after his death.
  - The compilation album called Dillatronic was released on October 30, 2015, nine years and eight months after his death.
  - His last album The Diary was released on April 15, 2016, ten years and two months after his death.
  - Dillagence II was released on August 25, 2026, Twenty years after his death.
- Big Hawk's album Endangered Species was released on May 15, 2007, A Year after his death in 2006.
- The Runaways' live album Live (Agora Ballroom, Cleveland - July 19, 1976 was released on November 2, 2015, eleven years after Sandy West's death from lung cancer.
- Nikki Sudden solo albums The Truth Doesn't Matter (2006) and Golden Vanity with Phil Shoenfelt (2009) were released. Many live albums have been released as well as stuff with Jaocbites and Swell Maps. Sudden died in March 2006.
- Ray Barretto's final album Standards Rican-ditioned, which was recorded in December 2005 prior to his death on February 17, 2006, was released on August 14, 2006.
- Malian singer and multi-instrumentalist Ali Farka Touré's album Savane was released on July 17, 2006, four months after his death in March.
  - His collaborative album with Toumani Diabaté entitled Ali and Toumani was released on February 23, 2010, four years after his death.
- Syd Barrett released his compilation album An Introduction to Syd Barrett on October 4, 2010, four years after his death. It features a series of new remasters and remixes of Pink Floyd songs and his post-band solo songs, it also features an unreleased track "Rhamadan".
- Brazilian singer-songwriter Yoñlu released his Self-Titled Album on May 5, 2008, almost two years after his death.
  - A Society in Which No Tear Is Shed Is Inconceivably Mediocre was released on April 14, 2009, three years after his death.
- Canadian jazz trumpeter Maynard Ferguson's last album The One and Only, which was recorded a few weeks prior to his death in 2006, was released several months later in 2007.
- Soul and funk singer James Brown's compilation albums The Singles, volumes II through XI, were released between 2007 and 2011 after his death from complications of pneumonia. They feature all 7" single releases, including re-issues and cancelled singles.
  - The live album entitled Live at the Apollo, Volume IV: September 13–14, 1972 was released on April 16, 2016, nine years after his death.
  - Live at Home with His Bad Self was released on October 25, 2019, almost thirteen years after his death.
  - His single "We Got to Change", which was recorded on August 16, 1970, was released on February 16, 2024, 17 years after his death.
- Korean singer U;Nee released her last album Habit on January 26, 2007, five days after her death.
- American jazz saxophonist Michael Brecker released his album Pilgrimage on May 22, 2007, four months after his death from myelodysplastic syndrome.
- Gerald Levert's In My Songs was released in February 2007, three months after his death.
- Argentine alternative rock band Babasónicos' album Mucho was released on May 8, 2008, almost four months after Gabriel "Gabo" Manelli's death from Hodgkin lymphoma.
- Macedonian singer-songwriter Toše Proeski's album The Hardest Thing was released posthumously in 2009, two years after his death in a car accident.
- French singer Grégory Lemarchal's album La Voix d'un ange was released on June 18, 2007, a month after his death from cystic fibrosis.
  - The compilation album entitled Rêves was released on November 16, 2009, two years after his death.
- LeRoi Moore, founding member of Dave Matthews Band, died of complications from an ATV accident while Big Whiskey and the Groogrux King was still in production. The album was released approximately nine months after his death.
- Black Beauty, an unreleased album by the group Love, was recorded and shelved in 1973. The album was released in 2012, five years after the death of the band's frontman, Arthur Lee.
- Luther Vandross' single "Shine" was released in 2006, the year following his death.
- Brad Delp of Boston committed suicide in March 2007. He appears on Rockin Away with Barry Goudreau (2007), Mark Miller's Whatcha Gonna Do (2008) and Bruce Arnold's Orpheus Again (2010).
- Since Ike Turner's death in 2007 many albums have been released such as Jack Rabbit Blues: The Singles of 1958–1960 (2011) and other early work.
- UGK released their album UGK 4 Life on March 31, 2009, two years after Pimp C's death in 2007.
  - The Naked Soul of Sweet Jones was released on October 5, 2010, three years after his death.
  - The album Still Pimping was released on July 12, 2011, four years after his death.
  - His last album Long Live the Pimp was released on December 4, 2015, eight years after his death.
- Spanish singer Rocío Dúrcal's album Duetos (with various artists) was released on August 25, 2009, three years after her death.
  - Una Estrella en el Cielo (with various artists) was released on November 30, 2010, four years after her death.
- Dan Fogelberg's Love in Time (2009) was released nearly two years after his death. Also, Live at Carnegie Hall was released in 2017.
- Canadian singer-songwriter Jeff Healey's album Mess of Blues was released on March 11, 2008, nine days after his death from sarcoma. Also Songs from the Road (2009), Last Call (2010) and others were released.
- Camu Tao's album King of Hearts was released on August 17, 2010, two years after his death in 2008.
- German musician Klaus Dinger's album Japandorf was released on March 22, 2013, five years after his death in 2008.
- Buddy Miles the drummer for Jimi Hendrix appears on Songs for Groovy Children: The Fillmore East Concerts released on November 22, 2019, nearly 50 years after the concert on New years 1969–1970. Hendrix died in 1970 and Miles died in 2008.
- Italian pop singer Valentina Giovagnini's album L'amore non ha fine was released on May 15, 2009, four months after her death in a car accident.
- Jimmy Carl Black released four studio and live albums in 2009. He appears on Frank Zappa and the Mothers of Invention's The Lumpy Money Project/Object (2009), Beat the Boots! III (2009), Road Tapes, Venue 1 (2012) and Meat Light (2016). Also, he appears on Ant-Bee's Electronic Church Muzik (2011).
- Spanish singer-songwriter Mari Trini's compilation album Yo No Soy Esa Que Tú Te Imaginas (Una Memoria Sentimental) was released on October 4, 2024, 15 years after her death from liver cancer. It features two previously unreleased songs: "Ayer (El Vals)" (French version of "Ayer") and "El Desamor" (movie version).
- Michael Jackson's song This Is It along with its soundtrack album was released on October 26, 2009, four months after his death in June.
  - I Want You Back! Unreleased Masters, a compilation of previously unreleased Jackson 5 songs and alternate versions of some of the group's hits, was released on November 10, 2009, roughly five months after Michael's death.
  - The music video for his song "One More Chance", which was filmed on November 17, 2003, was finished and released in a deluxe DVD box set Michael Jackson's Vision on November 22, 2010, 16 months after his death.
  - A month later, His first posthumous album of all-new material, simply titled Michael, was released on December 14, 2010.
  - The single All In Your Name featuring Barry Gibb was released on June 25, 2011. two years after his death.
  - Five months later, a Remix Album entitled Immortal was released on November 18, 2011.
  - Come and Get It: The Rare Pearls, another compilation of previously unreleased Jackson 5 songs, was released digitally on August 28, 2012 and psychically on September 18, 2012, three years after his death.
  - The 25th-anniversary edition reissue of Bad entitled Bad 25, featuring six unreleased tracks and his live performance at Wembley Stadium in 1988, was released on the same day on September 18, 2012.
  - His second posthumous album titled Xscape was released on May 13, 2014, about five years after his death.
  - The 40th-anniversary edition reissue of Thriller entitled Thriller 40, featuring ten unreleased tracks, was released on November 18, 2022, 13 years after his death.
- M2: Descending into Madness by Midnight was released in 2014 five years after Midnight died of a stomach aneurysm.
- Versailles album Jubilee was released on January 20, 2010, Five months after Jasmine You's death.
- Brother by Boyzone was released on March 8, 2010, five months after member Stephen Gately's death from natural causes on October 10, 2009.
- Peruvian creole singer Arturo "Zambo" Cavero's unreleased song "Mis Cenizas" was featured in the compilation album Gran colección de la música criolla which was released in 2011, two years after his death from complications of sepsis on October 9, 2009.
- Neil Young's The Archives Vol. 1 1963–1972 was released in June 2009. It features Bruce Palmer, Danny Whitten, Jack Nitzsche, Kenny Buttrey and Rick James, all of whom died years before the box set was released.
- Argentine singer Mercedes Sosa's first live album Deja la Vida Volar (En Gira) was released on October 4, 2010, exactly a year after her death.
  - Her second live album Ángel was released on October 23, 2014, five years after her death. It has unreleased live recordings between 1992 and 1996 in Europe and Latin America.
  - Her studio album Lucerito, which was recorded in 2000, was released on July 31, 2015, about six years after her death.
  - Her third live album En Vivo en el Gran Rex 2006, was released on August 9, 2024, nearly 15 years after her death.
  - Her fourth live album Mercedes Sosa en Nueva York, 1974, was released on November 22, 2024, 15 years after her death, and 46 years after the death of guitarist Santiago "Pepete" Bértiz.
- Al Martino's album Thank You was released in 2011, two years after his death.
- SOULmate by Jacksoul was released on December 1, 2009, ten days after Haydain Neale died of lung cancer.
- Jack Rose released three albums in 2010 after a sudden heart attack on December 5, 2009.
- Manic Street Preachers released an album Journal for Plague Lovers using lyrics constructed by Richey Edwards before his disappearance in 1995.
- Avenged Sevenfold's fifth album Nightmare was released on July 27, 2010, almost seven months after the death of drummer The Rev.
  - He was also featured on the band's eighth album Life Is But a Dream..., on two songs called "Mattel" and "Beautiful Morning". It was released on June 2, 2023, Fourteen years after his death.

=== 2010s ===
- Gregory Slay, founder of Remy Zero died on New Year's Day 2010. Slay appears on Horsethief Beats' The Sound Will Find You (2010).
- Francis M.'s collaborative album with Ely Buendia entitled In Love and War was released on May 25, 2010, A Year and two months after his death from acute myeloid leukemia.
- Japanese producer Nujabes released his album Spiritual State on December 3, 2011, a year after he died in a car accident in 2010.
  - His collaborative album with Shing02 entitled Luv(Sic) Hexalogy was released on December 9, 2015, four years after his death.
- Gil Scott-Heron's album Nothing New was released on April 19, 2014, almost three years after his death on May 27, 2011.
- Shiki∞project's album Kureha (紅葉) was released on December 7, 2011, Five months after Isshi's death.
- Jay Reatard had many singles released after he died of a drug overdose in early 2010. He appears on In Utero, in Tribute, in Entirety (2014) tribute to Nirvana.
- Indie rock band Sparklehorse released their collaborative album with Danger Mouse entitled Dark Night of the Soul on July 12, 2010, four months after singer and multi-instrumentalist Mark Linkous committed suicide.
  - Bird Machine an album that was recorded in 2009 was finally released on September 8, 2023, Thirteen years after Linkous' death.
- Dio's live album At Donington UK: Live 1983 & 1987 was released on November 9, 2010, nearly six months after Ronnie James Dio's death from stomach cancer.
  - Heaven & Hell's live album Neon Nights: 30 Years of Heaven & Hell was released on November 16, 2010, six months after his death.
  - Ronnie was featured on the song "Metal Will Never Die" (recorded in 2009) by David "Rock" Feinstein (guitarist in the bands Ronnie Dio & the Prophets, Elf and The Rods) in the album Bitten by the Beast, which was released on November 22, 2010, six months after his death.
  - He was also featured on the song "The Code" (the last one recorded also in 2009) by The Rods, in the album Vengeance, which was released on May 23, 2011, a year after his death.
  - Ronnie Dio & the Prophets' songs "Judy's Theme", "That's All" and "Fallin'" were featured in the compilation album The Early Years, which was released in Spain in 2012, two years after his death.
  - Dio's live album Finding the Sacred Heart – Live in Philly 1986 was released on June 17, 2013, three years after his death.
  - Another Dio's live album Live in London, Hammersmith Apollo 1993 was released on May 12, 2014, nearly four years after his death.
- Daisuke to Kuro no Injatachi (大佑と黒の隠者達) released their album Shikkoku no Hikari (漆黒の光) on April 20, 2011, Nine months after Daisuke Ochida's death in 2010.
- Gerry Rafferty's album Rest in Blue was released on September 3, 2021, Ten years after his death in 2011.
- Gary Moore's live album entitled Blues for Jimi was released on September 24, 2012, A Year and seven months after his death in 2011.
  - The album called How Blue Can You Get was released on April 30, 2021, Ten years after his death.
- John Martyn's Heaven and Earth studio album was released in May 2011, two years after he died. Many compilation albums have been released since his death.
- Conrad Schnitzler's last album Endtime, which was recorded four days before his death in 2011, was released on April 8, 2012.
- Canadian band Woods of Ypres released their album Woods 5: Grey Skies & Electric Light on February 13, 2012, three months after frontman David Gold's death in Late 2011.
- Slipknot's bassist Paul Gray is featured on their video album entitled (sic)nesses released on September 28, 2010, four months after his death.
  - He is also featured on Antennas to Hell released on July 23, 2012, two years after his death.
  - Both Paul and drummer Joey Jordison were featured on Slipknot's Live at MSG album released on August 18, 2023, 13 years after Paul's death and two years after Joey's death.
- Ou Est le Swimming Pool released their first and only album The Golden Year after lead singer Charles Haddon committed suicide two months before.
  - They were featured on the song "The Feeling" by Tiësto, Dutch DJ and record producer, from the album A Town Called Paradise, which was released on June 13, 2014, almost four years after Haddon's death.
- David Bedford's live album The Original Broadcast of the Orchestral Hergest Ridge, which is an orchestrated interpretation of Mike Oldfield's album Hergest Ridge, was released on August 28, 2025, nearly 14 years after his death from lung cancer.
- Swiss musician Steve Lee of Gotthard is featured on Homegrown – Live in Lugano in 2011 a year after he died.
- Eyedea's albums Birthday (I Feel Triangular) (2011) with Guitar Party, Grand's Sixth Sense (2011) with Sixth Sense, and The Many Faces of Mikey (2015) were all released after he died of a drug overdose in 2010.
- Mick Karn of Dalis Car is featured on InGladAloneness. It was released in 2012 a year after Karn died of cancer.
- Trish Keenan is featured on Scott Herren's The Only She Chapters (2011) and Broadcast's Berberian Sound Studio (2013). She suddenly died from pneumonia on January 14, 2011.
- Australian pub rock band Cold Chisel's Steve Prestwich is featured on No Plans (2012). Prestwich died of a brain tumor on January 16, 2011.
- Nate Dogg is featured in singles "Party We Will Throw Now!" (2012), "My House" with Warren G (2015), "Gangsta Walk" (2016), and "I Got Love" (2018). Dogg died in 2011.
- Wild Man Fischer's Deep State (2018) was released seven years after he died from heart failure.
- Andrew Gold's The Late Show – Live 1978 was released in 2015, four years after he died.
- Lioness: Hidden Treasures, an album of lost recordings (from 2002 to 2011) by British singer-songwriter Amy Winehouse, was released on December 5, 2011; four months after her death on July 23. Two singles were also released: "Our Day Will Come", on December 5; and "Body & Soul", which is a duet with the legendary Tony Bennett, on the day that would have been her 28th birthday.
  - Amy Winehouse at the BBC was released on November 13, 2012, a year and four months after her death.
  - The soundtrack album for her 2015 documentary Amy was released on October 30, 2015, four years after her death.
- Dear Mr Fantasy: The Jim Capaldi Story (2011) was released after Jim Capaldi died in 2005. This was a four-disc boxed set.
- Argentine singer Luis Alberto Spinetta released Los Amigo (recorded in 2011) on 27 November 2015 with a group project "Spinetta Los Amigo". Spinetta died of lung cancer on February 8, 2012.
  - He also released Ya No Mires Atrás (recorded between 2008 and 2009) on January 23, 2020.
- Captain Beefheart's album Bat Chain Puller was released on February 22, 2012. It was recorded in 1976. Also Sun Zoom Spark: 1970 to 1972 was released in 2014. Beefheart died in 2010 from multiple sclerosis.
- Deep Purple's founding member Jon Lord's final album Concerto for Group and Orchestra (studio version) was released on September 28, 2012, Two months after his death.
- Donna Summer's remix album Love to Love You Donna was released on October 22, 2013, a year and five months after her death with lung cancer.
- Pay Money to My Pain's album Gene was released on November 13, 2013, A Year after frontman K's death due to acute heart failure.
  - The track Room #103 was released on their official YouTube channel on December 29, 2014, Two years after his death.
  - His solo EP called Orange Ave. was released on January 4, 2023, Ten years after his death.
  - The Live DVD entitled From Here To Somewhere was released alongside their documentary SUNRISE TO SUNSET on May 8, 2024, Eleven years after his death.
- Levon Helm's album The Midnight Ramble Sessions, Volume Three (2014) was released two years after he died. Also he appears on Neil Young's Neil Young Archives Volume II: 1972–1976 (2020).
- Tommy Marth of The Killers is featured on Black Camaro's Black Camaricans in 2012.
- Robin Gibb of Bee Gees released the album entitled 50 St. Catherine's Drive on September 29, 2014, two years after his death in 2012.
  - Sing Slowly Sisters an unreleased album recorded in 1970 was released on May 29, 2015, three years after his death.
- Spanish flamenco guitarist Paco de Lucía's album Canción Andaluza was released on April 29, 2014, two months after his death from a heart attack.
  - His first posthumous live album Paco and John Live at Montreux 1987 (with John McLaughlin) was released on June 24, 2016, two years after his death.
  - His second posthumous live album The Montreux Years, which contains unreleased performances in 1984, 2006 and 2012, was released on February 24, 2023, almost nine years after his death.
  - His album Pepito y Paquito (with his brother Pepe de Lucía) was released on May 31, 2024, ten years after his death. It was recorded in 1959.
- Chuck Brown's album Beautiful Life was released on August 19, 2014, two years after his death.
- Renaissance's album Grandine il vento was released on June 1, 2013, seven months after Michael Dunford's death in late 2012 due to a massive cerebral hemorrhage.
- The Monkees album Christmas Party was released on October 12, 2018, six years after Davy Jones' death from a heart attack in 2012.
- No Use For A Name's compilation album entitled Rarities Vol. 1: The Covers was released on September 11, 2017, Five years and two months after lead singer Tony Sly's death in 2012.
  - Rarities Vol. 2: The Originals was released on February 12, 2021, Eight years and seven months after Tony's death.
- Mitch Lucker appears on Suicide Silence's video album Ending Is the Beginning: The Mitch Lucker Memorial Show on the song "Engine No. 9" via archival recordings. It was released on February 18, 2014, a year and three months after his death from a motorcycle accident.
  - Five months later, he also appeared on the album You Can't Stop Me released on July 14, 2014.
- Indian sitarist Ravi Shankar's final album The Living Room Sessions Part 2 was released on May 14, 2013, five months after his death in 2012.
  - The live album entitled Nine Decades Vol. IV: A Night at the John the Divine was released on August 14, 2013, about a year after his death.
  - Live in Bangalore (with Anoushka Shankar) was released on September 11, 2015, about three years after his death.
  - In Hollywood, 1971 was released on September 30, 2016, about four years after his death.
  - The album called Nine Decades Vol. V: Ghanashyam: A Broken Branch, which is a special re-mastered recording of the music-theater piece, was released on July 14, 2017, about five years after his death.
  - Nine Decades Vol. VI: Dutch-India Airwaves and Nine Decades Vol. VII: Live in Copenhagen were released on April 24, 2020, seven years after his death.
- Jenni Rivera's compilation album entitled La Misma Gran Señora was released on December 11, 2012, Two days after her death from a plane crash.
  - Both live albums 1969 – Siempre, En Vivo Desde Monterrey, Parte 1 and Parte 2 were released seven months apart the first being on December 3, 2013 and the second on July 1, 2014, Two years after her death.
  - Five months later the live DVD entitled 1 Vida – 3 Historias was released on December 2, 2014.
  - Paloma Negra Desde Monterrey was released on October 28, 2016, Four years after her death.
  - The compilation album entitled Angel Baby was released on December 5, 2017, Five years after her death.
  - The album Misión Cumplida was released on June 30, 2023, Eleven years after her death.
- From Beer to Eternity was the last album to have Ministry with Mike Scaccia. Scaccia died from a heart attack during the beginning of recording for the album.
- Beautiful was released on January 15, 2013, approximately two years after Teena Marie's death in December 2010.
- Flash's albums Flash Featuring Ray Bennett & Colin Carter and In Public were released after Peter Banks' death in March 2013.
- Lost My Way by Tim Ryan was released on October 8, 2013, approximately two years following a fatal car crash.
- Philip Chevron of The Pogues is on BBC Sessions 1984–1985, released on August 29, 2020. Chevron died in 2013.
- Eyehategod's drummer Joey LaCaze is on the band's album Eyehategod in 2014 a year after LaCaze died of respiratory failure.
- Step Back by Johnny Winter was released on September 2, 2014, almost two months after his death.
- Vietnamese singer-songwriter WanBi Tuấn Anh's final album Nụ cười Còn Mãi (with various artists) was released on the day that would have been his 27th birthday, almost six months after his death from complications of a pituitary tumor.
- Whitney Houston's two songs "Celebrate" (with Jordin Sparks) and "His Eye Is on the Sparrow" were featured on the soundtrack album Sparkle: Original Motion Picture Soundtrack, which was released on July 31, 2012, five months after her death. The music video for "Celebrate" was also released.
  - Her first live album Her Greatest Performances was released on November 10, 2014, two years and nine months after her death.
  - The compilation album entitled I Go to the Rock was released on March 24, 2023, 11 years after her death.
  - Her second live album The Concert for a New South Africa (Durban) was released on November 8, 2024, twelve years and nine months after her death.
- Game Theory's album Supercalifragile was released on August 24, 2017, four years after Scott Miller's death in 2013.
- Isaiah "Ikey" Owens appears on Run the Jewels' Run the Jewels 2 on October 24, 2014, and Omar Rodríguez-López's Arañas en la Sombra released in 2016. Owens died of a sudden heart attack on October 14, 2014, in Mexico.
- Venezuelan rapper Canserbero's collaborative album with NicoJP entitled Another Five, which was recorded in 2014, was released on October 3, 2025, ten years after his murder in January.
- Spanish singer and guitarist Peret's final album Des del Respecte / Desde el Respeto was released on November 17, 2017, three years after his death from lung cancer.
- Static-X's album Project Regeneration Vol. 1 was released on July 10, 2020, Six years after Wayne Static's death from an accidental drug and alcohol overdose.
  - Project Regeneration Vol. 2 was released on January 26, 2024, Nine years and two months after his death.
  - Mephisto Odyssey's re-imagined Fallen Star version of the song "Crash" was released on Dec 31, 2025, Eleven years after his death.
- Pink Floyd's 2014 album The Endless River was released six years after keyboardist Richard Wright's death; the album consists almost entirely of leftover instrumentals featuring Wright from the recording sessions for 1994's The Division Bell.
  - Wright's speaking vocals is featured on David Gilmour's song "A Boat Lies Waiting", from the album Rattle That Lock.
  - He also appeared in Barn Jams with Gilmour, which were filmed and recorded in January 2007, and some of the jams were released on Gilmour's albums: Live in Gdańsk DVD, the deluxe edition of Rattle That Lock and Luck and Strange, with the song of the same title and the original version as a bonus track.
  - He was featured in Pink Floyd's live album The Dark Side of the Moon Live at Wembley 1974 released on March 24, 2023, 15 years after his death.
- Mike Porcaro, bassist for Toto, is featured on Toto's 40 Trips Around the Sun (2018) and Old Is New (2018). The album features songs that have were previously unreleased.
- Argentine rock band Krebs' only album Krebs was released on March 13, 2015, after Agustín Briolini was electrocuted to death in 2014.
- Its All Over Now Baby Blue, recorded by the SIMS Foundation was a tribute album to Sims Ellison of Pariah, celebrating 20 years after his death. Ellison committed suicide in 1995 and is the first album after his death.
- British synth-pop band Visage released their album Demons to Diamonds on November 6, 2015, nine months after lead vocalist Steve Strange's death in February.
- The Velvet Underground's The Complete Matrix Tapes released in 2015 as a live album recorded in 1969. It has Lou Reed who died in 2013 and Sterling Morrison who died in 1995.
- Chinx Drugz's album Welcome to JFK was released on August 14, 2015, A Month after his death.
  - Legends Never Die was released on September 16, 2016, A Year after his death.
- Puerto Rican reggaeton singer Jadiel's compilation album Tsunami Is Back was released on February 14, 2017, almost three years of his death from a motorcycle accident.
- Curtis Knight's You Can't Use My Name: The RSVP/PPX Sessions (2015) featuring Jimi Hendrix was released after Knight died in 1999 and Hendrix died in 1970. This was recorded when Hendrix was backing up for Knight in 1965 to 1967 before Hendrix's fame.
- Motörhead's live album Clean Your Clock was released on June 10, 2016, six months after Lemmy Kilmister died from prostate cancer. Also many live albums including The Lost Tapes series have been released since his death.
  - Under Cöver was released on September 1, 2017, almost two years after his death.
  - Almost six years after his death Hellraiser had an official animated video released on October 21, 2021, for the 30th anniversary of No More Tears, featuring Lemmy and Ozzy Osbourne.
  - The album The Manticore Tapes, which was recorded in 1976, was released on June 27, 2025, nine years and six months after Lemmy's death; seven years after Eddie Clarke's death; and nine years and seven months after Phil Taylor's death.
- Johnnie Frierson's Have You Been Good to Yourself was found as a cassette tape at a thrift store in 2012 and released on August 19, 2016, six years after his death.
- Isao Tomita's live album Dr. Coppelius (with Tokyo Philharmonic Orchestra), which was recorded live at the 12th Bunkamura Orchard Hall on November 11 and 12, 2016, was released on March 22, 2017, 10 months after his death from heart failure.
- Sean Price's album Imperius Rex was released on August 8, 2017, two years after his death in 2015.
- Guru Josh's song "Love to Infinity" with Anike Ekina and Darren Bailie was released on May 29, 2020. Guru died in 2015 when he committed suicide.
- Tony Duran appears on Frank Zappa's live album Little Dots (2016), he was in Zappa's band in 1972. This album was recorded in fall of 1972 during the 1972 Petit Wazoo tour. Duran died from prostate cancer in 2011.
- Pantelis Pantelidis' single "Thimame" was released in June 2016, four months after his death in a car crash.
- Live Facelift by Alice in Chains was recorded in 1990, and released on vinyl in 2016. Also Live in Oakland October 8, 1992 was released on July 24, 2017, on vinyl. Featured both Layne Staley who died in 2002 and Mike Starr who died in 2011. Only 5000 copies were issued.
- A Tribe Called Quest's final album We Got It from Here... Thank You 4 Your Service was released on November 11, 2016, eight months after Phife Dawg died from diabetes. The album features guests Elton John, Jack White, Kanye West, Andre 3000, Kendrick Lamar, Anderson .Paak, Talib Kweli, Consequence and Busta Rhymes.
  - Phife Dawg's solo album Forever was released on March 22, 2022, in the 6th anniversary of his death.
- Michael Burks' I'm a Bluesman was released in 2016, after he died of a sudden heart attack in 2012.
- Eight months after David Bowie's 2016 death from liver cancer, The Gouster, an early version of Young Americans, was released as part of the box set Who Can I Be Now? (1974–1976).
  - Just two days short of the one year anniversary of Bowie's death, the EP No Plan was released, featuring three studio recordings of Bowie performing songs from his musical Lazarus, which had previously only been recorded by the musical's cast. The songs on No Plan are stated to be the last three songs Bowie had ever recorded in his lifetime.
  - Live Nassau Coliseum '76 was released on February 10, 2017, a year after his death.
  - Two months later, another live album called Cracked Actor was released on April 22, 2017.
  - Welcome to the Blackout was released on April 21, 2018, two years after his death.
  - Six months later, Never Let Me Down 2018 was released on October 12, 2018.
  - Glastonbury 2000 was released a month later on November 30, 2018.
  - The compilation album called Spying Through a Keyhole was released on April 5, 2019, three years after his death.
  - Seven months later, the box set entitled Conversation Piece was released on November 15, 2019.
  - The EP entitled Is It Any Wonder? was released on February 14, 2020, four years after his death.
  - ChangesNowBowie was released two months later on April 17, 2020.
  - Four months later, I'm Only Dancing was released on August 29, 2020.
  - The album called Toy was released on November 26, 2021, five years after his death.
  - The live album entitled Ready, Set, Go! was released on April 12, 2025 (Record Store Day), Nine years after his death.
  - The Shel Talmy Recordings was released on September 18, 2026, Ten years after his death.
- Last in Line's debut album Heavy Crown was released on February 19, 2016, nearly five weeks after Jimmy Bain's death from lung cancer on January 23, 2016.
- Prince's greatest hits album 4ever featuring the unreleased track "Moonbeam Levels", which was recorded in 1982 was released on November 22, 2016, seven months after his death of a fentanyl overdose. Also many album re-issues have been released since his death.
  - His demo album entitled Piano and a Microphone 1983 was released on September 21, 2018, a year and ten months after his death.
  - Originals was released on June 7, 2019, two years after his death.
  - The album entitled Welcome 2 America was released on July 30, 2021, five years and three months after his death.
  - The album called Timeless was released on August 28, 2026, ten years and four months after his death.
- Alan Vega's first posthumous album It, which contains recordings from 2010-2016, was released on July 14, 2017, almost a year after his death.
  - His second posthumous album Mutator, which contains recordings from 1995-1997, was released on April 23, 2021, almost five years after his death.
  - His third posthumous album Insurrection, which contains recordings from 1997-1998, was released on May 31, 2024, almost eight years after his death.
- Christina Grimmie was featured on the soundtrack album of her first and only film The Matchbreaker it was released on November 29, 2016, five months after her murder in June of the same year.
  - Five months later, her EP, Side B was released on April 21, 2017.
  - Two months later, on the day before the first anniversary of her death, her album All Is Vanity was released on June 9, 2017.
  - Her single "Little Girl" was released on May 11, 2018, almost two years after her death.
  - "Hold Your Head Up" was released on June 13, 2019, three years after her death.
  - "Cry Wolf" was released on September 15, 2020, four years after her death.
  - "Back to Life", which was recorded in 2015, was released on June 4, 2021, almost five years after her death.
  - "Rule the World" was completed as a duet with vocals by Ryan Brown, and was released on March 11, 2022, five years and nine months after her death.
  - "Eyes of Your Storm", which was recorded in 2015, was released on February 13, 2026, nine years and eight months after her death.
  - Five months later, The Legacy Collection compilation album was released on July 17, 2026.
- Leon Russell's final album On a Distant Shore was released on September 22, 2017. He died in his sleep nearly a year earlier from heart surgery.
- Greg Lake's live album Live in Piacenza, which was recorded live in 2012, was released on December 7, 2017, exactly a year after his death from pancreatic cancer. Also he produced Annie Barbazza & Max Repetti album Moonchild (2018).
- Rick Parfitt's album Over and Out was released on March 23, 2018, two years after his death in 2016.
- German electronic band Tangerine Dream is featured on Jean-Michel Jarre's song "Zero Gravity" from the album Electronica 1: The Time Machine, released as a single on July 10, 2015, nearly six months after Edgar Froese's death.
  - The mini-album Quantum Key was released on November 20, 2015, ten months after Edgar Froese's death.
  - The album Quantum Gate was released on September 29, 2017, two years after Froese's death.
  - The EP entitled Probe 6–8, which has two songs co-written by Froese, was released on November 26, 2021, six years after Froese's death.
  - The album Raum, which has three songs co-written by Froese, was released on February 25, 2022, seven years after Froese's death.
- Sharon Jones' album Soul of a Woman featuring her band The Dap-Kings was released on November 17, 2017, a year after her death from pancreatic cancer.
- Glen Campbell's album Sings for the King, which is a compilation of previously unreleased demo recordings Campbell made for Elvis Presley, including one remixed track combining Campbell and Presley's vocals, was released on November 16, 2018, a year and three months after his death from Alzheimer's disease, and 41 years after Presley's death.
  - The album Duets - Ghosts on the Canvas Sessions (with various artists) was released on April 19, 2024, almost seven years after his death.
- AC/DC's album Power Up was released on November 13, 2020, almost three years after Malcolm Young's death from the effects of dementia. Although he did not participate in the album, he co-wrote all of the album's songs, as they were never-before released tracks written by him and Angus.
- Viola Beach's eponymous album was released in July 2016, five months after all the band members (and their manager) died when their car fell off a bridge.
- Charles Bradley's album Black Velvet was released on November 9, 2018, a year after his death.
- Jonghyun's second solo album Poet | Artist, was released on January 23, 2018, A Month after his death.
  - He was featured on Shinee's The Best from Now On compilation album. released on April 18, 2018, Four months after his death.
  - A Month later, he was also featured on Shinee's The Story Of Light album, in the special track entitled "Lock You Down". The album was released on May 28, 2018.
  - He was featured on Shinee's single Poet | Artist a song which was an outtake on his final album of the same name. The song was released on May 25, 2025, Eight years after his death.
- Mexican singer Juan Gabriel's first posthumous album Los Dúo, Vol. 3 was released on November 11, 2022. He died of a heart attack on August 28, 2016.
  - Charles Aznavour appears in the song "Venecia Sin Ti" from the same album, four years after his death.
  - His second posthumous album México con Escalas en Mi Corazón (Ciudades) was released on October 5, 2023, seven years after his death.
  - His third posthumous album Eterno was released on September 5, 2025, nine years after his death.
- Here's to You, the ninth studio album by country music duo Montgomery Gentry, was released following member Troy Gentry's death in a helicopter crash. The accident took place on September 8, 2017, in Medford, New Jersey, where the duo was scheduled to perform that evening.
- Chuck Berry's final album Chuck, which was recorded between 1991 and 2014, was released on June 9, 2017, four months after he died of cardiac arrest in March.
  - His first posthumous live album Rockin' Rollin' New Year's Eve, which was recorded live on December 31, 1988, in New York City, was released on November 27, 2020, three years and eight months after his death.
  - His second posthumous live album Live from Blueberry Hill, which was recorded live between 2005 and 2006, was released on December 17, 2021, four years and nine months after his death.
- Johnny Cash's Forever Words (2018) features Chris Cornell, former lead singer of Soundgarden and Audioslave on "You Never Knew My Mind". Cash died in 2003 and Cornell died by suicide on May 18, 2017.
  - Cornell's Self-Titled Album was released on November 16, 2018, a year and a half after his death.
  - Soundgarden's album Live from the Artists Den was released on July 26, 2019, two years after his death.
  - Cornell's cover album No One Sings Like You Anymore was released on December 11, 2020, three years and seven months after his death.
- Falling Down, a collaboration between rappers XXXTentacion and Lil Peep was released on September 19, 2018. It is Lil Peep's third posthumous single as a lead artist (ten months after his death) and XXX's first (three months after he was murdered).
  - XXX's album Skins was released on December 7, 2018, almost six months after his death.
  - Bad Vibes Forever was released on December 6, 2019, a year and six months after his death.
  - The compilation album Look at Me featuring 11 songs from his SoundCloud era and the song True Love was released on June 10, 2022, four years after his death.
- Gregg Allman's final album Southern Blood was released on September 8, 2017, four months after his death from liver cancer.
  - The Allman Brothers Band's live album Manley Field House, Syracuse University, April 7, 1972 was released on January 12, 2024, seven years after Gregg's death & 52 years after Berry Oakley's death.
- Tom Petty's box set entitled An American Treasure was released on September 28, 2018, almost a year after his death in 2017.
  - His second solo album was re-released under the name Wildflowers & All the Rest on October 16, 2020, three years after his death.
  - Live at the Fillmore 1997 was released on November 25, 2022, five years after his death.
  - The expanded Deluxe Edition of his album Long After Dark, which features twelve previously unreleased tracks, was released on October 18, 2024, seven years after his death.
- Butch Trucks of The Allman Brothers Band is featured on Allman's The Fox Box (2017), Filmore West 1971 (2019) and Trouble No More: 50th Anniversary Collection (2020). He died in January 2017.
- Earth, Wind & Fire's founding member Maurice White's final album Manifestation was released digitally on July 16, 2019, three years after his death. Its deluxe edition, which features six previously unissued tracks, was released on May 3, 2024, eight years after his death.
- George Michael's song "This Is How (We Want You to Get High)", which was recorded in 2015, was released in Last Christmas soundtrack album on November 8, 2019, almost three years after his death from heart and liver disease.
  - His live album The Faith Tour, which was recorded between May 30 and 31, 1988 in Paris, was released in November 6, 2026, ten years after his death.
- 10x10 by Ronnie Montrose was released on September 29, 2017. Montrose died in March 2012.
- Prodigy's album The Hegelian Dialectic 2 (The Book of Heroine) was released on September 30, 2022, Five years after his death in 2017.
  - Mobb Deep's final album Infinite was released on October 10, 2025, Eight years after Prodigy's death.
- Chester Bennington of Linkin Park is on the band's album One More Light Live released on December 15, 2017, just five months after Bennington's suicide. It was a European tour for the album One More Light just weeks before he died.
  - Bennington featured on the song "Cross Off" by Mark Morton, from the album Anesthetic, which was released in 2019.
  - Bennington's former band, Grey Daze, released their album Amends on June 26, 2020, nearly three years after his suicide.
  - The 20th anniversary edition of Linkin Park's album Hybrid Theory was released on October 9, 2020, with many unreleased songs and demos from 1996 to 2002.
  - Grey Daze's album The Phoenix was released on June 17, 2022, Five years after his death.
  - The 20th anniversary edition of Meteora was released on April 7, 2023. Including the songs "Lost" and "Fighting Myself".
  - The compilation album entitled Papercuts - Singles Collection 2000-2023 featuring the song "Friendly Fire" an outtake from the One More Light sessions was finally released on April 12, 2024, seven years after his death. Its music video was also released.
- Geoffrey Gurrumul Yunupingu's album Djarimirri was released on April 13, 2018, Nine months after his death in July 2017.
  - The compilation album The Gurrumul Story was released on September 10, 2021, Four years after his death.
  - Banbirrngu was released on November 8, 2024, Seven years after his death.
- French composer Pierre Henry's box set Galaxie Pierre Henry was released on March 19, 2021, three years and eight months after his death. It features some previously unreleased works.
  - Henry's speaking vocals is featured on Jean-Michel Jarre's song "Agora", from the album Oxymore.
- French rock and roll and pop singer Johnny Hallyday's posthumous album Mon pays c'est l'amour was released on October 19, 2018, ten months after his death from cancer on December 5, 2017.
  - The song "C'est l'amour que j'attendais" (with Michel Berger), which was recorded during Rock'n'roll attitude sessions in 1985, was released on December 4, 2025, almost eight years after his death, and 33 years after Berger's death from a heart attack.
- Irish rock band The Cranberries' final album In the End was released on April 26, 2019, over a year after the death of lead singer Dolores O'Riordan.
  - Many live performances were featured on the 25th anniversary editions of Everybody Else Is Doing It, So Why Can't We?, No Need to Argue and To the Faithful Departed.
  - Their live album MTV Unplugged, which was recorded in 1995, was released on November 7, 2025, almost eight years after O'Riordan's death.
- Kyle Pavone of We Came as Romans did a collaboration song with Kayzo and ARMNHMR, "LA Never Says Goodbye", released in 2019. Pavone died form an accidental drug overdose on August 25, 2018.
- French singer Charles Aznavour's English-language album I Will Warm Your Heart, which was recorded in 1975, was released on May 24, 2024, five years after his death from cardiorespiratory arrest.
  - Six months later, the Spanish-language Christmas album El Disco de Navidad, which was recorded in 1996, was released on November 22, 2024.
- Metalcore band All That Remains released their album Victim of the New Disease on November 9, 2018, a month after lead guitarist Oli Herbert's death in October.
- Dead or Alive's final album Fan the Flame (Part 2): The Resurrection, which was recorded on 1992, was released on October 29, 2021, five years after Pete Burns' death and two and a half years after Steve Coy's death.
- The Tragically Hip frontman Gord Downie released his double album entitled Introduce Yerself on October 27, 2017, ten days after his death from brain cancer. Also many album re-issues including outtakes and demos have been released since his death.
  - Two months later, The Tragically Hip's live DVD called A National Celebration was released on December 8, 2017.
  - Away Is Mine, an album containing his last recordings was released on October 16, 2020, almost three years after his death.
  - Their EP Saskadelphia was released on May 21, 2021, four years after his death.
  - Live at the Roxy was released on June 24, 2022, five years and eight months after his death.
  - The collaborative album entitled Lustre Parfait featuring Bob Rock was released on May 5, 2023, six years and seven months after his death.
  - Live at 6 O'Clock was released on February 27, 2026, Nine years after his death.
- Lil Peep's album Come Over When You're Sober, Pt. 2 was released on November 9, 2018, nearly a year after his death.
  - The Goth Angel Sinner EP was released on October 31, 2019, nearly two years after his death.
  - Two weeks later, his compilation album Everybody's Everything was released on November 15, 2019.
  - His collaborative album with ILoveMakonnen entitled Diamonds was released on September 8, 2023, almost six years after his death.
  - COWYS, Pt. 2 (OG Version) was released two months later on November 10, 2023.
- South African musician and composer Hugh Masekela's collaborative album with Tony Allen entitled Rejoice, which was recorded in 2010, was released on March 20, 2020, two years after his death from prostate cancer.
  - His final album with the Trinidadian steel band Siparia Deltones entitled Siparia to Soweto, which was recorded between 2012 and 2016, was released on September 15, 2023, five years and almost eight months after his death.
- Smoke Dawg's album Struggle Before Glory was released on November 30, 2018, five months after his death.
- Avicii's song "SOS" was released on April 10, 2019, almost a year after his death.
  - A month later, his posthumous album TIM was released on June 6, 2019.
- J. J. Cale is featured on Eric Clapton's Live in San Diego album which was recorded in 2007 and released on September 30, 2016, three years after his death.
  - His final album Stay Around was released on April 26, 2019, nearly six years after his death.
- French musical duo Cassius' final album, Dreems was released on June 21, 2019, 2 days after Philippe Zdar died after falling from a 19-storey building in Paris.
- Scary Kids Scaring Kids released their single "Loved Forever" on September 29, 2019, honoring former lead singer Tyson Stevens who died of a suspected heroin overdose in 2014. Stevens would have been 34 years old on his birthday.
- Spanish singer Camilo Sesto's song "Te Quiero Así" was released on September 7, 2020, a year after he died from kidney failure. It was recorded during Amaneciendo sessions.
  - His live album CAMILO Love Sound Typhoon, which was recorded live in Osaka, Japan, on May 17, 1985, was released on December 5, 2025, six years after his death.
- Yes' live album Like It Is: Yes at the Mesa Arts Center, which was recorded in 2014, was released on July 3, 2015, nearly a week after Chris Squire died from leukemia in 2015.
  - The song "Don't Take No for an Answer", which was recorded during Fly from Here sessions, was released on the new version of the album Fly from Here – Return Trip on March 25, 2018, nearly three years after Squire's death.
  - The mini-album From a Page, which was recorded in 2010, was released on October 25, 2019, four years after Squire's death.
- Gang Starr's One of the Best Yet was released on November 1, 2019, nine years after Guru died from blood cancer.
- Canadian singer-songwriter Leonard Cohen's last album Thanks for the Dance was released on November 22, 2019, three years after his death.
- Argentine singer-songwriter Gustavo Cerati was featured on Leandro Fresco's song "Sol de Medianoche" from the album El Reino Invisible, which was released on March 2, 2015, nearly six months after his death.
  - His first live album En Vivo en Monterrey was released on November 20, 2019, five years after his death.
  - The music video for his song "No Te Creo", which was filmed in 2004, was released on YouTube on August 10, 2021.
  - His second live album 14 episodios sinfónicos / En vivo / Auditorio Nacional / Ciudad de México / Febrero 2002 was released on the day that would have been his 63th birthday.
- Nipsey Hussle's collaborative album with Bino Rideaux entitled Prolific will be released on August 14, 2026, Seven years after his death in Early 2019.
- Mexican singer José José's compilation album José por siempre José (Revisitado) was released on September 25, 2020, nearly a year after his death from pancreatic cancer. It contains revisited versions of his songs.
  - The compilation album entitled Aún te echamos de menos, was released on October 31, 2024, five years after his death. It contains 2024 mixes of his songs and the previously unreleased song "Ya no pienso en ti", which was recorded in 1978.
  - The EP entitled Amor para los dos, was released on February 27, 2025, five and a half years after his death.
- Brazilian singer-songwriter Juliano Cezar's EP Para Sempre EP 1 (Ao Vivo) was released on December 3, 2021, almost two years after his death from a heart attack on stage on December 31, 2019.

=== 2020s ===
- Mac Miller's album Circles was released on January 17, 2020, a year and four months after his death.
  - Balloonerism was released on January 17, 2025, seven years after his death.
- Earth Quake's live album Live at Rockpalast 1978 was released on October 31, 2025, over five years after Steve Nelson's death, six years after Stan Miller's death, over 14 years after John Doukas' death and 18 years after Gary Phillips' death.
- Cadet's debut studio album The Rated Legend was released on April 10, 2020, A Year and two months after his death in a car accident in 2019.
- Eddie Money's album Brand New Day was released on April 21, 2020, seven months after his death. It was originally set to be released on July 19, 2019, but was subsequently postponed due to Money's illness.
- Gorillaz's song How Far?, featuring Tony Allen, was released on May 2, 2020, two days after Allen's death.
- Neil Peart appears on the 40th anniversary version of Rush's album Permanent Waves, released on May 29, 2020. The 40th anniversary edition features unreleased live content from concerts in England. Peart died four months before its release.
- Pop Smoke's debut album entitled Shoot for the Stars, Aim for the Moon on July 3, 2020, five months after his death.
  - The album Faith was released on July 16, 2021, a year and five months after his death.
- Juice Wrld's album Legends Never Die was released on July 10, 2020, seven months after his death.
  - Two weeks later he was featured on The Kid Laroi's mixtape entitled F*ck Love on the song "Go" which was released on July 24, 2020.
  - His single "Bad Boy", featuring Young Thug along with his final music video that Cole Bennett filmed and directed was released on January 15, 2021, over a year and a month after his death.
  - The album Fighting Demons was released on December 10, 2021, two years and two days after his death.
  - His single Bye Bye featuring Marshmello was released on October 14, 2022, Almost three years after his death.
  - The Pre-Party EP was released on September 8, 2024, over four and a half years after his death.
  - Two months later, The Party Never Ends was released on November 29, 2024.
- King Crimson's member Bill Rieflin appears in the video album In the Court of the Crimson King: King Crimson at 50 and other performances including the Rock in Rio concert, released on December 9, 2022, two years after his death from complications of colon cancer.
  - He will also be featured on King Crimson's live album 2014 NYC, which will be released on July 10, 2026, six months after his death.
- Kenny Rogers' album Life Is Like a Song was released on June 2, 2023, three years after his death.
- Haruma Miura's second single "Night Diver", was released digitally via A-Sketch on July 24, 2020 and physically on August 26, 2020, one month and eight days after his death.
- Spanish rock band Jarabe de Palo's music video for their song "Misteriosamente Hoy" was released on December 11, 2020, six months after Pau Donés' death from colon cancer.
- Mexican singer-songwriter and composer Armando Manzanero was featured on the song "Todavía" with Carlos Rivera from his album Leyendas, released on May 28, 2021, five months after his death from COVID-19. Its music video was also released.
- MF Doom's collaborative album with Czarface entitled Super What? was released on May 7, 2021, seven months after his death.
- Van Halen's live album Live in Dallas 1991 was released on March 23, 2025, four years and five months after Eddie Van Halen's death from a stroke on October 6, 2020.
- Ken Hensley appears on Blind Golem's song "The Day Is Gone" from the album A Dream of Fantasy released in 2021. Hensley died on November 4, 2020.
- Neil Young's Neil Young Archives Volume II: 1972–1976 features band members Tim Drummond, Jack Nitzsche, Kenny Buttrey, Stan Szelest, Rusty Kershaw, Joe Lala, Rick Danko and Levon Helm.
- King Von's album What It Means to Be King was released on March 4, 2022, a year after his death in 2020.
  - The album Grandson was released on July 14, 2023, almost three years after his death.
- MO3's album Shottaz 4Eva was released on April 9, 2021, Five months after his death.
  - The album Legend was released on May 30, 2024, Three years and six months after his death.
- Kool & The Gang's album Perfect Union was released on August 20, 2021, a year after Ronald Bell's death and nearly two weeks after Dennis "D.T." Thomas' death.
  - Ronald was featured on the songs "Let's Party", "We Are the Party" and "99 Miles to JC" from the album People Just Wanna Have Fun, which was released on July 14, 2023, almost two years after his death. Dennis "D.T." Thomas was also featured on the songs "Let's Party" and "99 Miles to JC", nearly two years after his death.
- German electronic musician Florian Schneider appears on Kraftwerk's song "Non Stop" from the album Remixes released on December 21, 2020, eight months after his death.
- Finnish guitarist and singer Alexi Laiho appears on Bodom After Midnight's Paint the Sky with Blood, released in 2021. Laiho died on December 29, 2020.
- 6 Dogs' album Ronald was released on March 12, 2021, two months after his death in January.
  - He was featured in Lyrical Lemonade's album All Is Yellow, released on January 26, 2024, three years after his death.
- Sophie's sophomore Self-Titled Album was released on September 25, 2024, three years after her death in 2021.
- Chick Corea appears on Eliane Elias's Mirror Mirror, released on September 10, 2021. Corea died on February 9, 2021, from cancer.
  - His first posthumous live album Resonance (with Makoto Ozone), which was recorded live at various locations in Japan in 2016, was released on August 25, 2021, six months after his death.
  - His final album Remembrance (with Béla Fleck) was released on May 10, 2024, three years and three months after his death.
  - His second posthumous live album Trilogy 3 (with Brian Blade and Christian McBride), which was recorded live between February and March 2020 in Europe, was released on February 28, 2025, four years after his death.
  - His third posthumous live album Forever Yours: The Farewell Performance, which was recorded live at Ruth Eckerd Hall in Clearwater, FL in October 2020, was released on October 17, 2025, four years and eight months after his death.
- DMX's album Exodus was released on May 28, 2021. The single "X Moves", which did not appear on Exodus, was released six days after his death. DMX died on April 9, 2021, from a sudden heart attack.
  - His EP entitled Let Us Pray: Chapter X was released on December 13, 2024, eight months after his death.
- Vinyl copies of Weezer's album Van Weezer contain bonus unused vocals by Ric Ocasek recorded in 2014. The album released on May 7, 2021, nearly two years after Ocasek's death.
- Lee "Scratch" Perry's album King Perry was released on February 2, 2024, two years and six months after his death in 2021.
  - His final album Spaceship to Mars was released on August 30, 2024, three years after his death.
- Phi Nhung's single "Hai Ơi, Đừng Qua Sông" was released on October 8, 2021, ten days after her death from COVID-19.
- Charlie Watts appears the reissue of The Rolling Stones's Tattoo You released on October 22, 2021, two months after his death.
  - He was also featured on the songs "Live by the Sword" and "Mess It Up" from the album Hackney Diamonds, which was released on October 20, 2023, two years and two months after his death.
  - He was also featured on the songs "Hit Me in the Head" and "Bad Luck Hideaway" from the album Foreign Tongues, which was released on July 10, 2026, almost five years after his death.
  - He also appears on many live albums by The Rolling Stones since his death.
- Brazilian singer Marília Mendonça extended plays Decretos Reais, Vol. 1, Decretos Reais, Vol. 2, and Decretos Reais, Vol. 3 were released on 2022 and 2023, less than a year following her death from a plane crash on November 5, 2021.
- Taylor Hawkins appears on Ozzy Osbourne's album Patient Number 9, released on September 9, 2022, nearly six months after his death from a cardiovascular collapse.
  - He was also featured on Iggy Pop's album Every Loser, released on January 6, 2023, almost a year after his death.
- German electronic musician Klaus Schulze's final album Deus Arrakis was released on July 1, 2022, two months after his death.
  - His second posthumous album 101, Milky Way, which was recorded in 2009, was released on November 15, 2024, two years after his death.
  - His live album Bon Voyage (Live Audimax Hamburg 1981) was released on April 25, 2025, nearly three years after his death.
- Ramsey Lewis' album The Beatles Songbook was released on January 6, 2023, Almost four months after his death.
- The Uncrowned's second album entitled WITNESS was released on September 21, 2022, a month after their lead singer SHAL died due to cervical cancer.
  - The album STOPOVER was released on November 22, 2023, a year and three months after her death.
- Dr. John's album Things Happen That Way was released on September 23, 2022, three years after his death in 2019 from a heart attack.
- Riky Rick's album Boss Zonke Forever was released on April 4, 2025, Three years after his death in 2022.
- Olivia Newton-John's cover of the song "Jolene" (with Dolly Parton) was released on February 17, 2023, six months after her death from breast cancer. Its music video was also released.
- Low Roar's Self-Titled Album was re-released on vinyl and it features a new song entitled "No Words" the song was released on November 7, 2023, a year after lead singer Ryan Karazija's death due to complications with pneumonia.
  - The album House in the Woods was released on February 7, 2025, two years and four months after Karazija's death.
- XY member YOSHI released his album Reiwa Rockstar (令和のロックスター) on May 15, 2025, Two and a half years after his death from a motorcycle accident.
- Aaron Carter's final album Blacklisted was released on November 7, 2022, two days after his death.
  - The album Recovery was released on May 24, 2024, A Year and six months after his death.
- i_o's album Warehouse Summer in collaboration with Lights was released on November 23, 2022, exactly two years after his death.
- Takeoff was featured on Metro Boomin's song "Feel the Fiyaaaah" released on December 2, 2022, a month after his death.
  - He was also featured on Quavo's album Rocket Power released on August 18, 2023, nine months after his death.
- Indian singer Sidhu Moose Wala has released multiple songs after his death including Mera Na on April 7, 2023, 11 months after his death.
- Young Dolph's album Paper Route Frank was released on December 16, 2022, a year after his death.
- South African rapper AKA released his album Mass Country on February 24, 2023, two weeks after his death.
- The Quireboys' live album Live at Rockpalast 2007 & 1990 was released on July 25, 2025, two years after Guy Bailey's death.
- Lil Keed's album Keed Talk to 'Em 2 was released on March 17, 2023, Ten months after his death.
  - His collaborative album with Lil Gotit entitled Fraternal was released on October 31, 2025, Three years and five months after his death.
- Bobbie Nelson's final album Loving You (with Amanda Shires) was released on June 23, 2023, a year and three months after her death.
- Evelyn Thomas' song "Out with the Old", which was recorded in 2010, was released on August 1, 2024, a week and four days after her death.
- Dire Straits' member Jack Sonni was featured in a live album entitled San Antonio Live in 85, which was released on 16 May 2025, a year and nearly nine months after his death.
- Peruvian singer and actor Diego Bertie's EP entitled Rio XXX was released on April 28, 2023, eight months after his death from a fall from the 14th floor of the building.
- Cuban singer Pablo Milanés was featured on the song "Mi Isla Bella" by Alexis Valdés and his daughter Haydée Milanés, which was released on April 20, 2023, nearly five months after his death from myelodysplastic syndrome.
  - He was also featured on the song "El Largo Camino de Santiago" by Spanish Celtic band Luar na Lubre from the album Encrucillada, which was released on May 19, 2023, nearly six months after his death.
  - His album Amor y salsa (with various artists) was released on May 26, 2023, six months after his death.
  - He was featured on the song "Y Tú Qué Has Hecho" from the album Rodando por el Mundo by José Alberto "El Canario", which was released on September 14, 2023, nearly a year after his death. Its music video was also released.
  - His collaborative album with Francisco Céspedes entitled P&P was released on April 17, 2026, three years and nearly five months after his death.
- Mexican ranchera singer Vicente Fernández was featured on the song "La Jugada" by Ana Bárbara, which was recorded in 2018, and was released on February 17, 2023, a year and two months after his death. Its music video was also released.
  - His album Vicente Fernández le canta a los grandes compositores de México was released on August 10, 2023, nearly two years after his death.
  - Three months later, Las clásicas de José Alfredo Jiménez Vol. 2 was released on November 23, 2023.
  - Ten months later, Pa' la parranda was released on September 6, 2024.
  - Vicente Fernández con Banda, which was recorded between 2010 and 2011, was released on November 28, 2024, nearly three years after his death. It features five previously unreleased songs.
  - Tributo al Rey con Banda (Grandes Duetos Vol. 1), an album with various artists was released on May 14, 2026, four years and five months after his death.
- Bernie Marsden's album Working Man was released on December 8, 2023, Almost three months after his death.
  - The album Icons was released on May 9, 2025, A Year and nine months after his death.
- Jazz trumpeter Jaimie Branch released his album Fly or Die Fly or Die Fly or Die (World War) on August 25, 2023, a year after her death.
- De La Soul's album Cabin in the Sky was released on November 21, 2025, Two years after Trugoy The Dove's death in early 2023.
- Lynyrd Skynyrd's live album Celebrating 50 Years - Live At The Ryman was released on June 27, 2025, Two years after Gary Rossington's death in 2023.
- Jimmy Buffett's album Equal Strain on All Parts was released on November 3, 2023, two months after his death due to complications from Merkel-cell carcinoma.
- Kool & The Gang member George "Funky" Brown released his solo album entitled Where I'm Coming From on September 13, 2024, Ten months after his death in 2023.
- BUCK-TICK released their live DVD entitled BUCK-TICK バクチク現象 -2023-, The live performance features archival footage and vocal recordings of Atsushi Sakurai who passed away in late 2023. The live DVD was released on August 21, 2024, almost a year after Atsushi's death.
  - Almost a month later, The live album called TOUR 2023 異空-IZORA- FINALO was released on September 18, 2024.
- X Japan bassist HEATH released his box set entitled All of Heath on October 23, 2024, Almost a year after his death in 2023 due to colon cancer.
- Jeff Beck was featured on Mark Knopfler's 2024 studio version of the song Going Home (Theme from Local Hero) (with various musicians), which was released on March 15, 2024, a year after his death. It was Beck's last recording.
- Denny Laine appears on Paul McCartney and Wings' album One Hand Clapping, which was released on June 14, 2024, six months after his death, and 26 years after Linda McCartney's death.
- Punk Band MC5 released their album Heavy Lifting on October 18, 2024, eight months after Wayne Kramer's death and five months after Dennis Thompson's death.
- Cola Boyy's album Quit to Play Chess was released on May 23, 2025, A Year and two months after his death in 2024.
- The GazettE bassist REITA was featured in a live DVD entitled LIVE TOUR 2022-2023 / MASS 'THE FINAL' LIVE AT 07.15 NIPPON BUDOKAN it was released on April 17, 2024, two days after his death.
- Shellac's sixth studio album To All Trains was released on May 17, 2024, ten days after the death of producer, songwriter and guitarist Steve Albini.
- Japanese band NEE released their single Popstar (ポップスター) on July 24, 2024, Two months after Qoo's death.
  - Their compilation album entitled EXPO (博覧会) was released on May 21, 2025, A Year after Qoo's death.
- Rich Homie Quan's album Forever Goin' In was released on October 4, 2024, A Month after his death from an accidental overdose.
  - The compilation album entitled Legacy of Hits was released on October 3, 2025, A Year after his death.
- Nell Smith's only album Anxious was released on April 11, 2025, Six months after her death from a car accident.
  - The first music video for her song "Anxious" was released on YouTube on February 6, 2025.
  - The second music video for her song "Boy in a Bubble" was released on YouTube on February 27, 2025.
  - The third music video for her song "Billions of People" was released on YouTube on March 20, 2025.
  - The fourth music video for her song "Daisy Fields" was released on YouTube on April 10, 2025.
  - The last music video for her song "Split in the Sky", which was filmed hours before her death, was released on YouTube on April 30, 2025.
- Ed Askew's final album The Final Painting was released on July 31, 2026, A Year and six months after his death in 2025.
- Former My Chemical Romance drummer Bob Bryar was featured on the deluxe re-issue of Three Cheers for Sweet Revenge which was released on June 6, 2025, Seven months after his death.
- Gary Brooker's live album Live at Rockpalast 1983 was released on May 30, 2025, three years after his death from cancer.
- Dominican merengue singer Rubby Pérez's EP entitled La Voz y La Trompeta (with Rodhen Santos) was released on June 27, 2025, two months after his death in the Jet Set nightclub roof collapse.
- Mexican corridos tumbados singer Chuy Montana's album No Fue Suerte was released on June 26, 2025, approximately a year and a half after his murder near Tijuana.
- The Beach Boys' founding member Brian Wilson's final album Cows in the Pasture (with Fred Vail), which was recorded between April 1970 and 2024, will be released in 2026.
- Peruvian salsa group La Timbera Orquesta's single "Y Tú Te Vas" was released on November 8, 2025, almost a month after the murders of Johan Mora and Ariana Cañola.
- Clem Burke of Blondie will be featured on the album High Noon which will be released in the spring of 2026 after his death from cancer on April 6, 2025.
- Pre-Black Sabbath band Earth released their album The Legendary Lost Tapes on September 12, 2025, nearly two months after Ozzy Osbourne's death from a heart attack on July 22, 2025.
  - Two months later, Ozzy was featured on Judas Priest's cover of Black Sabbath's song "War Pigs", which was released on September 26, 2025.
  - The upcoming live album called Back To The Beginning is set to be released on December 11, 2026, A Year after his death.
- Gorillaz's 2026 album The Mountain features numerous posthumous features.
  - "The Mountain" features Dennis Hopper, who died 16 years prior.
  - "The Moon Cave" features Bobby Womack and Trugoy the Dove, who died 12 and 3 years prior, respectively.
  - "The Hardest Thing" features Tony Allen, who died 6 years prior.
  - "The Manifesto" features Proof, who died 20 years prior.
  - "Delerium" features Mark E. Smith, who died 8 years prior.
- CKY's single Days Of Self Destruction was released on August 14, 2026, Almost a year after Brent Hinds' death in 2025.
- Rapper Coolio's final album Long Live Coolio will be released in 2026.
- Luna Sea's single "Forever" was released on May 29, 2026, three months after Shinya's death.
