= 21st South African Music Awards =

2015 award ceremony

21st Annual South African Music Awards
- Date: Sunday, April 19, 2015
- Venue: Sun City Resort, Bojanala, North West
- Country: South Africa
- Hosted by: HHP

Highlights
- Most awards: Beatenberg (7)
- Most nominations: Cassper Nyovest (5); Beatenberg (5)
- Website: samusicawards.co.za

Television/radio coverage
- Network: SABC 1
- Runtime: 120 minutes

The 21st Annual South African Music Awards were announced during a gala event at Sun City's Super Bowl arena in the North West province on Sunday night, 19 April 2015. It was branded as #SAMAXXI, where XXI represents the Roman numerals for 21.

== Winners and nominees ==
Cassper Nyovest had five nominations for SAMA awards but only walked away with Newcomer of the Year. K.O. beat him to the Best Rap Album of the Year and AKA took Male Artist of the Year. Beatenberg secured 3 SAMAs out of 5 nominations. The group went to win four Special Awards during the pre-show for their collaboration with DJ Clock.

=== Awards ===
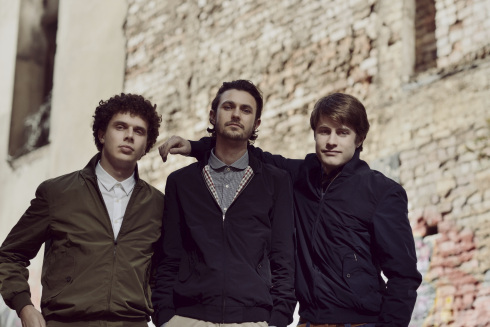
Beatenberg, Album of the Year

Album of the Year: The Hanging Gardens of Beatenberg – Beatenberg; Tsholofelo – Cassper Nyovest; Skhanda Republic – K.O.; Vulani – Ringo Madlingozi; Nostalgic Moments – The Soil	Duo or Group of the Year: Beatenberg – The Hanging Gardens of Beatenberg; Bittereinder – Skerm; BlackByrd – Home; McCoy Mrubata – Brasskap Sessions Vol. 2; The Soil – Nostalgic Moments
Female Artist of the Year: Bucie – Princess of House (Easy to Love); Lulu Dikana – I Came To Love; Maleh – You Make My Heart Go; Moneoa – Ndim Lo; Simphiwe Dana – Firebrand	Male Artist of the Year: AKA – Levels; Cassper Nyovest – Tsholofelo; Jimmy Nevis – The Masses; K.O. – Skhanda Republic; Ringo Madlingozi – Vulani
Newcomer of the Year: Cassper Nyovest – Tsholofelo; Beatenberg – The Hanging Gardens of Beatenberg; Duncan – Street Government; Howie Combrink – Eat It While It's Hot; Jeremy Loops – Trading Change	Best Rock Album: Morning After – aKING; Let The Night In – Prime Circle; Majestic – Reburn; Tenfold – Taxi Violence; Knuckles – Zebra & Giraffe
Best Pop Album: The Hanging Gardens of Beatenberg – Beatenberg; The Masses – Jimmy Nevis; Home – Monark; Kiff – The Kiffness; Ascension – Toya Delazy	Best Pop Album (Afrikaans): Die Regte Tyd – Riana Nel; Skildery – Nádine; Lied Vir Die Vrou – Kurt Darren; Nooit Oud Raak Nie – Eden; Maak ‘n Wens – Bobby van Jaarsveld
Best Adult Contemporary Album: Back Again – Joe Niemand; Lightning Prevails – Arno Carstens; Home – BlackByrd; Eat It While It's Hot – Howie Combrink; S'bongile – Josie Field	Beste Kontemporêre Musiek Album: Ek en Jy – Dewald Wasserfal; Want Jy Is Boer – Adam Tas; Posduif – Chris Chameleon and Daniella Deysel; Hande Vol Genade – Dozi; Wat Die Hart Van Vol Is – Pieter Koen
Best Traditional Music Album: Spoken Word & Music – Botlhale Boikanyo; Living For Yesterday – Brian Finch; Palesa – Imfez'emnyama; Isiporoporo – Impumelelo; Uhambo Olusha – Qadasi	Best Maskandi Album: Igema Lami – Thokozani Langa; KoMalume – Abakamnyandu; Mhla Uphelamandla – Amawele Ka Mamtshawe; Ohulumeni – Ichwane Lebhaca; I Facebook – Maqhinga Radebe
Best Jazz Album: Brasskap Sessions Vol. 2 – McCoy Mrubata; African Time Quartet in Concert – Herbie Tsoaeli; Dream State – Kyle Shepherd Trio; Maji in the Land of Milk & Honey – Marcus Wyatt; Mother Tongue – Nduduzo Makhathini	Best R&B / Soul / Reggae Album: For The Lovers – Afrotraction; I Came To Love – Lulu Dikana; Ndim Lo – MoNeOa; Nostalgic Moments – The Soil; Did It For Love – Vusi Nova
Best Rap Album: Skhanda Republic – K.O.; Levels – AKA; Tsholofelo – Cassper Nyovest; Street Government – Duncan; Audio High Definition – Reason	Best Kwaito Album: University of Kalawa Jazmee Since 1994 – Professor; The Boss – L’vovo Derrango; Licence to Hustle – Phi & Ginger; Legend – Mojalefa Thebe; Delicious – Trompies
Best Dance Album: Fortune Teller – Black Motion; Princess of House (Easy to Love) – Bucie; The Brand New Me: Soul Candi Sessions 2015 (Disc 2) – Cuebur; Da Capo – Da Capo; The 4th Tick: A Clockumentary – DJ Clock	Best Classical / Instrumental Album: Winds Of Samsara – Wouter Kellerman; Soos in die Ou Dae – CH2 Guitar Duo; Baroqueswing – Charl du Plessis Trio; Padkos – Tony Cox; Phoenix Camerata – University of Pretoria
Best Traditional Faith Album: Bayede Baba – Sfiso Ncwane; Chapter 6 Ujehova Ungibiyele – Andile Kamajola; Ama VIP – Rebecca Malope; Victory In The Blood – Rofhiwa Manyaga; Live Project 11 – Worship House	Best Contemporary Faith Music Album: Power Love Sound – Loyiso; The Uprising – Khaya Mthethwa; Rhythm of Worship – Ndo Dlakadla; He’s Alive – Tybelo; Freedom – Word & Life Worship
Best African Adult Album: You Make My Heart Go – Maleh; Back To My Roots – Kelly Khumalo; Traveling Man – MaxHoba; Vulani – Ringo Madlingozi; Firebrand – Simphiwe Dana	Best Alternative Album: Skerm – Bittereinder; Space Elephant – Bye Beneco; Mistress – David Moffatt; Trading Change – Jeremy Loops; Light – Tailor
Best Live DVD: First Decade by Lira – Robin Kohl; Renewal in His Presence by Benjamin Dube – Aubrey Peacock and Benjamin Dube; Krone Live by Krone – Ben Heyns; Spirit Of Praise Vol. 5 by Spirit Of Praise – Aubrey Peacock, Benjamin Dube and Oupa Montshiwaga; Innibos is Groot 2014 by Various Artists – Barry Pretorius	Best Music Video of the Year: "Let The Night In" by Prime Circle – Ryan Kruger; "Yaya" by DJ Dimplez featuring Dream Team and ANATII – Studio Space; "Turn You On" by Micasa – Izm Works; "In Defense Of My Art" by Tumi Molekane – Kyle Lewis; "Ghetto" by Zakes Bantwini – Zakes Bantwini
Best Producer of the Year: Wouter Kellerman and Ricky Kej – Winds Of Samsara by Wouter Kellerman; Denholm Harding – Let The Night In by Prime Circle; Ewald Jansen Van Rensburg – Negatives by Monark; Holidave – Home by BlackByrd; Lulu Dikana and Powella Tiemo – I Came To Love by Lulu Dikana	Best Engineer of the Year: Brian O'Shea, Crighton Goodwill and Maruispopplanet – Johnny Apple by Johnny Apple; Dave Reynolds and Peter Pearlson – The Light of Day by Dave Reynolds; Peter Auret – Brasskap Sessions Vol. 2 by McCoy Mrubata; Heritage Sound – Let The Night In by Prime Circle; Jürgen von Wechmar, Rogan Kelsey, Ross Fink and Jaziel Sommers – Ascension by Toya Delazy
Best Collaboration: K.O. featuring Kid X – "Caracara"; AKA featuring K.O. – "Run Jozi"; Cassper Nyovest featuring Gusheshe – "OkMalumkoolkat"; DJ Clock featuring Beatenberg – "Pluto"; The Soil featuring Ladysmith Black Mambazo – "Hamba Uyosebenza"	Remix of the Year: "Indlela Yam" – DJ Sbu and Robbie Malinga; "Tsiki Tsiki" – Select Play; "Goldfish Moonwalk Away" – Goldfish; "Personal Paradise" – Heavy K; "Amantombazane" – Riky Rick

=== Special awards ===
International Achievement Award

- Wouter Kellerman – The world-renowned flautist received the award for his Grammy-winning album, Winds of Samsara.

Lifetime Achievement Awards

- M'du Masilela
- Mandla Mofokeng
- Zim Ngqawana

SAMPRA Award (Highest Airplay of the Year)

- "Pluto" – DJ Clock featuring Beatenberg

=== Mobile Music Awards ===
Best Selling Album

- Die Regte Tyd – Riana Nel

Best Selling DVD

- Vol. 18 One Purpose – Joyous SA

Best Selling Mobile Music Download

- "Pluto" – DJ Clock featuring Beatenberg

Best Selling Ring-Back Tone

- "Pluto" – DJ Clock featuring Beatenberg

Best Selling Full-Track Download

- "Pluto" – DJ Clock featuring Beatenberg
