= Alan Dawa Dolma discography =

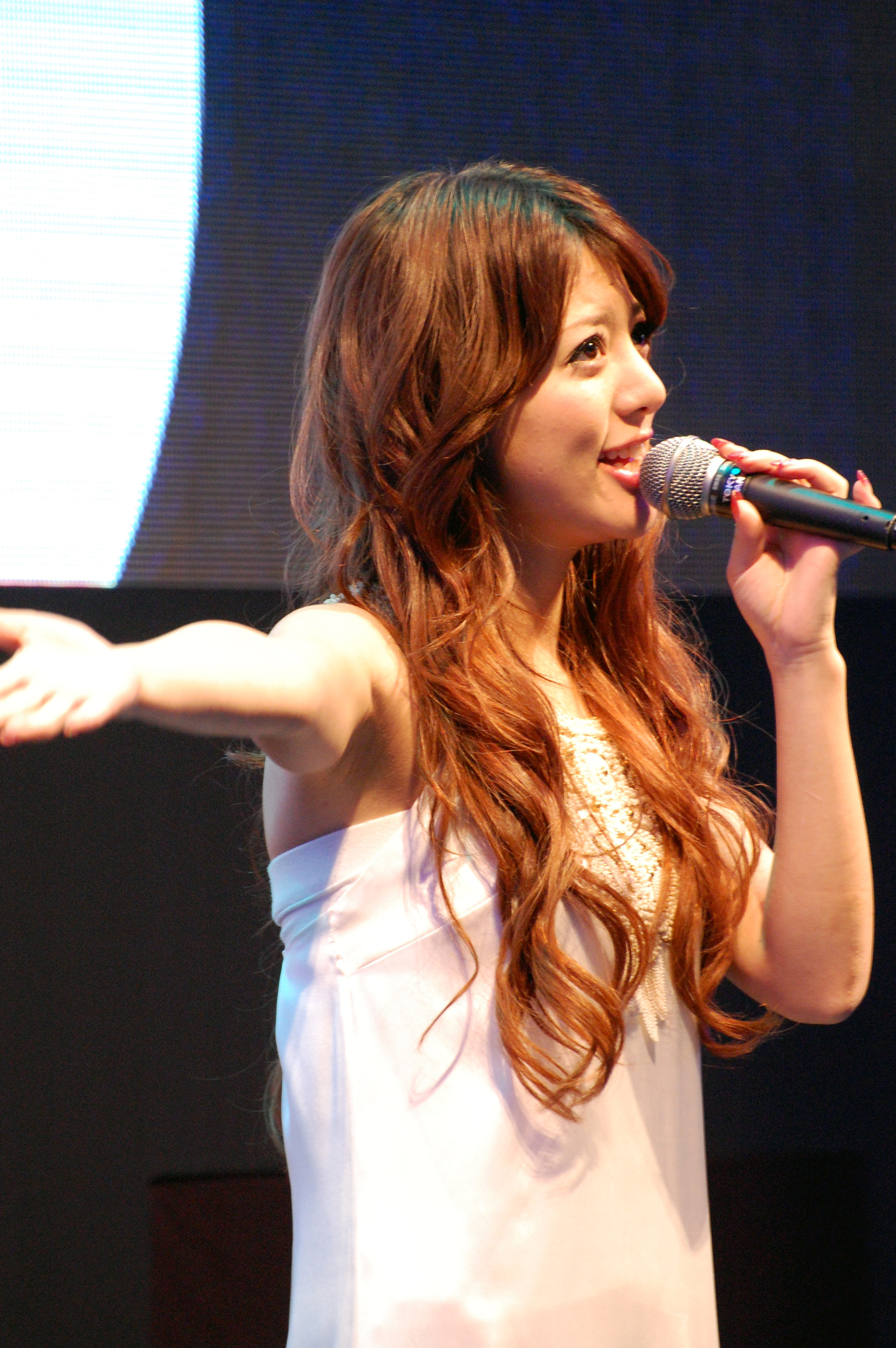
- Alan in 2008
- Studio albums: 7
- Extended plays: 2
- Compilation albums: 1
- Singles: 17
- Digital releases: 58
- Concert DVDs: 3

The discography of Chinese recording artist Alan Dawa Dolma, active in Japan and China, consists of seven studio albums, one compilation album, two extended play, seventeen singles, fifty eight digital releases and three concert DVDs.

== Studio albums ==
=== Japanese ===
Year	Album details	Peak chart positions		Sales
Year	Album details	JPN	TWN East Asia	Sales
Voice of Earth	Released: March 4, 2009; Label: Avex Trax; Formats: CD, digital download	15	5	JPN: 23,568
My Life	Released: November 25, 2009; Label: Avex Trax; Formats: CD, digital download	16	—	JPN: 21,065

=== Mandarin Chinese ===
Title	Album details
Shengsheng Zui Rulan (声声醉如兰)	Released: August 12, 2005; Formats: CD
Xin De Dongfang (心的東方)	Released: July 10, 2009; Label: Avex China; Formats: CD, digital download
Love Song	Released: June 18, 2012; Label: Yue Hua Entertainment; Formats: CD, digital download
Mo Lan (驀蘭)	Released: July 15, 2014; Label: Yue Hua Entertainment; Formats: CD, digital download
Shi Nian (十念)	Released: November 24, 2017; Formats: CD, digital download; Label: Yue Hua Entertainment

== Compilation albums ==
Year	Album details	Peak chart positions	Sales
Year	Album details	JPN	Sales
Japan Premium Best	Released: March 2, 2011; Label: Avex Trax; Formats: CD, digital download	15	JPN: 9,957

== Extended plays ==
Title	Album details	Album
Xin Zhan: Red Cliff	Released: June 20, 2008; Label: Avex China; Formats: CD, digital download	Xin De Dongfang
Lan Se ~Love Moon Light~ (蘭色)	Released: April 16, 2010; Label: Avex China; Formats: CD, digital download	

== Singles ==
Title	Year	Peak chart positions	Sales (JPN)	Album
Title	Year	JPN	Sales (JPN)	Album
"Ashita e no Sanka"	2007	69	4,729	Voice of Earth
"Hitotsu"	2008	100	1,486	Voice of Earth
"Natsukashii Mirai (Longing Future)"	2008	19	10,267	Voice of Earth
"Sora Uta"	2008	34	4,537	Voice of Earth
"Kaze no Tegami"	2008	34	3,914	Voice of Earth
"Red Cliff (Shin-Sen)"	2008	23	15,642	Voice of Earth
"Megumi no Ame"	2008	30	5,422	Voice of Earth
"Gunjō no Tani"	2009	30	4,580	Voice of Earth
"Kuon no Kawa"	2009	3	37,740	My Life
"Ballad (Namonaki Koi no Uta)"	2009	11	13,925	My Life
"Swear"	2009	35	3,854	My Life
"Diamond/Over the Clouds"	2010	20	8,976	Japan Premium Best & More
"Kaze ni Mukau Hana"	2010	17	6,313	Japan Premium Best & More
"Kanashimi wa Yuki ni Nemuru"	2010	20	5,624	Japan Premium Best & More
"Ai wa Chikara" (with Kei Fukui)	2011	95	567	Non-album singles
"Minna dene - PANDA with Candy BEAR's - / Ikiru"	2011	25	5,306	Non-album singles
"Dream Express ~Mugen Kukan Cho Tokkyu~"	2013	196	339	Non-album singles
"Michishirube"	2015	—		Non-album singles

== Digital releases ==
=== Japanese ===
Title	Year	Released
"Shiawase no Kane"	2008	May 20, 2008
"Liberty"	2009	January 5, 2009
"Happy Birthday to You/alan"	2010	January 12, 2010
"Michishirube"	2015	March 25, 2015
"The Lost Eden"	2015	September 29, 2015

=== Chinese ===
Title	Year	Released	Album
"Ai Jiushi Shou"	2008	May 20, 2008	
"Jiayou! Ni You Me!"	2008	October 29, 2008	
"Chibi ~Da Jiangdong Qu~"	2009	April 8, 2009	
"Huhuan"	2011	January 10, 2011	
"Yinghua De Yanlei"	2011	February 24, 2011	
"Wo Huilaile"	2011	November 18, 2011	
"为爱成魔"	2014	May 28, 2014	
"遥远的重逢"	2014	June 10, 2014	
"真爱无双"	2014	October 31, 2014	
"The Lost Eden"	2015	September 29, 2015	
"一梦千寻"	2015	November 25, 2015	
"霸道天下"	2016	January 26, 2016	
"心花"	2016	April 15, 2016	十念
"唱给天空听"	2016	May 9, 2016	
"一朵雲"	2016	July 25, 2016	
"上师祈祷文"	2016	September 7, 2016	
"兰之乐光"	2017	April 19, 2017	
"幻梦"	2017	April 26, 2017	十念
"不负人间"	2017	May 10, 2017	
"龙女"	2017	May 20, 2017	十念
"热血三国"	2017	June 22, 2017	
"做个磨人的小妖精"	2017	October 17, 2017	
"美人谷"	2017	October 27, 2017	十念
"Time Goes By"	2017	November 3, 2017	十念
"乐此不疲"	2017	November 10, 2017	十念
"赌注"	2017	November 17, 2017	十念
"有你真好"	2017	December 29, 2017	
"吉祥三聚"	2018	March 27, 2018	
"转念"	2018	June 3, 2018	
"离兮"	2018	July 26, 2018	
"拈花笑"	2018	August 10, 2018	
"好热好热"	2018	August 10, 2018	
"桃花缘"	2018	August 17, 2018	
"叹相思"	2018	October 17, 2018	盛唐幻夜 影视原声带
"天涯寄北"	2019	May 29, 2019	
"最完美的分手"	2019	June 11, 2019	你是我的大明星
"白衣的天使"	2019	July 15, 2019	
"朝暮"	2019	August 28, 2019	
"远飞的大雁"	2019	September 20, 2019	
"等爱"	2019	October 24, 2019	
"冰之翼"	2019	November 21, 2019	
"熊猫侠"	2019	December 4, 2019	
"夢中的圖瓦盧"	2019	December 11, 2019	
"追求"	2019	December 19, 2019	電視劇《劍王朝》原聲帶
"新年好"	2020	January 1, 2020	
"每一滴泪是一颗星"	2020	April 19, 2020	
"星灯"	2020	May 31, 2020	
"无相"	2020	June 24, 2020	
"情缘"	2020	June 24, 2020	
"晚"	2020	August 7, 2020	
"不忘相思"	2020	August 25, 2020	
"布达拉宫"	2020	October 23, 2020	

== DVDs ==
Year	Information	Peak chart positions	Sales
Year	Information	JPN DVD	Sales
Alan 1st Concert Tour: Voice of You In Tokyo 2010.01.24	Released: March 24, 2010; Format: DVD	10	JPN: 2,675
Alan Japan Premium Best & More Live 2011	Released: December 21, 2011; Format: DVD	29	JPN: 2,776
alan symphony 2014 LIVE DVD	Released: March 31, 2015; Format: DVD		
