= In My Life (disambiguation) =

"In My Life" is a 1965 song by the Beatles.

In My Life may also refer to:

== Film and theatre ==
- In My Life (1978 film), a Danish drama by Bille August
- In My Life (2009 film), a Filipino drama starring Vilma Santos-Recto
- In My Life (musical), a 2005 Broadway musical by Joseph Brooks

== Music ==
=== Albums ===
- In My Life (Cilla Black album), 1974
- In My Life (George Lamond album), 1992
- In My Life (George Martin album), 1998
- In My Life (Judy Collins album), 1966
- In My Life (Kevin Kern album), 1999
- In My Life (Marian McPartland album), 1993
- In My Life: Greatest Hits or the title song (see below), by Stephanie Mills, 1985
- In My Life, by Ariel Rivera, 2001
- In My Life, by Patti Austin, 1983

=== Songs ===
- "In My Life" (Divinyls song), 1984
- "In My Life" (Juvenile song), 2003
- "In My Life" (The Rasmus song), 2003
- "In My Life", by the Brian Jonestown Massacre from Take It from the Man!, 1996
- "In My Life", by Glen Campbell from Still Within the Sound of My Voice, 1987
- "In My Life", by Kim Wilde from The Singles Collection 1981–1993, 1993
- "In My Life", by Nelly from Suit, 2004
- "In My Life", by the Real Milli Vanilli from The Moment of Truth, 1991
- "In My Life", by Stephanie Mills from I've Got the Cure, 1984
- "In My Life", from the musical Les Misérables, 1980

== See also ==
- In My Lifetime (disambiguation)
- It's My Life (disambiguation)
- My Life (disambiguation)
- The Story of My Life (disambiguation)
- This Is My Life (disambiguation)
