= My Life =

My Life may refer to:

== Autobiographies ==
- Mein Leben (Wagner) (My Life), by Richard Wagner, 1870
- My Life (Clinton autobiography), by Bill Clinton, 2004
- My Life (Meir autobiography), by Golda Meir, 1973
- My Life (Mosley autobiography), by Oswald Mosley, 1968
- My Life (Trotsky autobiography), by Leon Trotsky, 1930
- My Life: A Spoken Autobiography, by Fidel Castro, with Ignacio Ramonet, 2006
- My Life, by Isadora Duncan, 1927
- My Life, by Lyn Hejinian, 1980
- My Life, by Magic Johnson, 1992
- My Life, by David Lange, 2005
- My Life, by Burt Reynolds, 1994
- My Life, by John Starks, 2004
- My Life, by Alfred Russel Wallace, 1905

== Music ==
=== Albums ===
- My Life (Alan Dawa Dolma album) or the title song, 2009
- My Life (Don Chezina album), 2007
- My Life (Grace Griffith album) or the title song, 2006
- My Life (Iris DeMent album) or the title song, 1994
- My Life (Jake Shimabukuro album), 2007
- My Life (Mary J. Blige album) or the title song, 1994
- My Life (Rain album), 2017
- My Life (Ronnie Milsap album) or the title song, 2006
- My Life: The Greatest Hits, by Julio Iglesias, 1998
- My Life: The True Testimony, by Blood Raw, 2008
- My Life, a 1999 album by Antidote
- My Life, a 2004 album by Hideaki Tokunaga
- My Life, a 2008 album by Mai Hoshimura
- My Life, a 2019 album by Marwa Loud

=== Songs ===
- "My Life" (50 Cent song), 2012
- "My Life" (Billy Joel song), 1978
- "My Life" (Bliss N Eso song), 2013
- "My Life" (The Game song), 2008
- "My Life" (Hot Rod song), 2012
- "My Life" (J. Cole, 21 Savage and Morray song), 2021
- "My Life" (Kids in the Kitchen song), 1985
- "My Life" (Phil Ochs song), 1969
- "My Life" (Slaughterhouse song), 2012
- "My Life (Throw It Away If I Want To)", by Bill Anderson, 1969
- "My Life", by 12 Stones from 12 Stones, 2002
- "My Life", by Anson Lo, 2024
- "My Life", by Big Tymers from I Got That Work, 2000
- "My Life", by C-Murder from The Tru Story: Continued, 2006
- "My Life", by DJ Khaled from We the Best Forever, 2011
- "My Life", by Dido from No Angel, 1999
- "My Life", by E-40 from The Block Brochure: Welcome to the Soil 2, 2012
- "My Life", by Erykah Badu from Mama's Gun, 2000
- "My Life", by Imagine Dragons from Mercury – Act 1, 2021
- "My Life", by Jesse Johnson, 1996
- "My Life", by jj from jj n° 3, 2010
- "My Life", by John Frusciante and Josh Klinghoffer from A Sphere in the Heart of Silence, 2004
- "My Life", by John Lennon from John Lennon Anthology, 1998
- "My Life", by K. Michelle from Rebellious Soul, 2013
- "My Life", by KRS-One from Life, 2006
- "My Life", by Mark Owen from In Your Own Time, 2003
- "My Life", by NF from Perception, 2017
- "My Life", by the Ohio Players from Contradiction, 1976
- "My Life", by Oingo Boingo from Boi-ngo, 1987
- "My Life", by Reks from Grey Hairs, 2008
- "My Life", by Robin Thicke from Despicable Me: Original Motion Picture Soundtrack, 2010
- "My Life", by Rodney Atkins from Caught Up in the Country, 2019
- "My Life", by Sleeping with Sirens from Gossip, 2017
- "My Life", by Styles P from A Gangster and a Gentleman, 2002
- "My Life", by T.I. from Urban Legend, 2004
- "My Life", by TLC from FanMail, 1999
- "My Life", by Tanvi Shah from the film Saroja, 2008
- "My Life", by Wumpscut from Music for a Slaughtering Tribe, 1993
- "My Life", by Zhu with Tame Impala from Ringos Desert, 2018
- "My Life", by Zion I from Break a Dawn, 2006

== Other ==
- My Life (film), a 1993 drama
- "My Life" (novella), an 1896 novella by Anton Chekhov
- My Life: Karate Kids, a 2010 British television documentary
- MyLife, an American information brokerage firm

== See also ==
- In My Life (disambiguation)
- The Story of My Life (disambiguation)
- This Is My Life (disambiguation)
- It's My Life (disambiguation)
- Mi Vida (disambiguation)
- My Life and Loves, by Frank Harris
