= David Reynolds =

David Reynolds may refer to:

- David Reynolds (author) (born 1948), English publisher and author
- David Reynolds (historian) (born 1952), English professor of history
- David Reynolds (racing driver) (born 1985), Australian racing car driver
- David Reynolds (screenwriter) (born 1962), American screenwriter for television and film
- David H. Reynolds, co-owner of a mobile home parks business in the United States
- David P. Reynolds (1915–2011), American businessman, also owner and breeder of thoroughbred racing horses
- David S. Reynolds (born 1948), American historian
- Dave Reynolds (musician) (born 1972), South African composer and multi-instrumentalist

== See also ==
- David Reynolds (Jericho), character in 2006 TV series Jericho
