= This Is Your Life =

This Is Your Life may refer to:

== Television ==
- This Is Your Life (American TV series), an American documentary biography series hosted by Ralph Edwards
- This Is Your Life (Australian TV series), the Australian version of the American series
- This Is Your Life (British TV series), the British version of the American series
- This Is Your Life (New Zealand TV series), the New Zealand version of the American series

== Radio ==
- This Is Your Life (radio program), an American radio documentary biography series hosted by Ralph Edwards

== Literature ==
- This Is Your Life, a 2002 novel by John O'Farrell

== Music ==
=== Albums ===
- This Is Your Life (Norman Connors album) or the title song, 1977
- This Is Your Life (Out of Eden album) or the title song, 2002
- Ronnie James Dio – This Is Your Life, 2014
- This Is Your Life, by the Adicts, or the title song, 1984
- This Is Your Life, by Augustines, 2016
- This Is Your Life, an EP by Glaxo Babies, or the title song, 1979

=== Songs ===
- "This Is Your Life" (song), by Switchfoot, 2003
- "This Is Your Life", by the 5th Dimension from Portrait, 1970
- "This Is Your Life", by Banderas, 1991
- "This Is Your Life", by the Bee Gees from E.S.P., 1987
- "This Is Your Life", by the Blow Monkeys from Whoops! There Goes the Neighbourhood, 1989
- "This Is Your Life", by Carcass from The Heartwork, 1993
- "This Is Your Life", by Dio from Angry Machines, 1996
- "This Is Your Life", by Dropkick Murphys from Blackout, 2003
- "This Is Your Life", by the Dust Brothers, from the film Fight Club, 1999
- "This Is Your Life", by En Vogue from Funky Divas, 1992
- "This Is Your Life", by the Killers from Day & Age, 2008
- "This Is Your Life", by Propagandhi from Supporting Caste, 2009
- "This Is Your Life", by Robin Schulz from Sugar, 2015

== See also ==
- This Is My Life (disambiguation)
- This Is the Life (disambiguation)
