= Ésta es mi vida =

Ésta es mi vida, meaning "This Is My Life" in Spanish, may refer to:

- This Is My Life (1952 film)
- Esta Es Mi Vida, an album by Jesse & Joy
