= Someday Soon =

Someday Soon or Some Day Soon may refer to:

- "Someday Soon" (Ian Tyson song), also recorded by Judy Collins, Moe Bandy, Chris LeDoux, and Suzy Bogguss
- "Someday Soon" (Natalie Bassingthwaighte song)
- "Someday Soon", a song by Crosby, Stills, Nash & Young from Looking Forward
- "Someday Soon", a song by Doves from Some Cities
- "Someday Soon", a song by Great Big Sea, from Great Big Sea
- "Someday Soon", a song by Journey from Departure
- "Someday Soon", a song by KT Tunstall from Drastic Fantastic
- "Someday Soon", a song by Wilco from Being There
- Some Day Soon, a 2004 album by Kristian Leontiou
- "Some Day Soon", a song by Alexi Murdoch from Towards The Sun
