= Prime circle =

Prime circle may refer to:

- Prime Circle, South African rock band
- Prime circle (engineering)
