= Grace Griffith =

American folk and Celtic singer (1956–2021)

- Born: Grace Bernadette Sisson; October 30, 1956; La Plata, Maryland, U.S.
- Died: June 5, 2021 (aged 64) Silver Spring, Maryland, U.S.
- Genres: Folk, celtic, contemporary
- Occupations: Singer
- Instruments: Vocals
- Years active: 1988–2021
- Label: Blix Street Records
- Website: Seamaid.org; Grace Griffith discography at MusicBrainz

Grace Bernadette Griffith (née Sisson; October 30, 1956 – June 5, 2021) was an American folk and Celtic singer based in Washington, D.C. She has been honored with multiple Wammie awards by the Washington Area Music Association. Griffith was diagnosed with Parkinson's disease in 1998, and died of complications from the disease in 2021.

== Early life and education ==
Griffith was raised in a family of ten children on a small farm in Southern Maryland. At a young age she began singing and accompanying herself on guitar playing in small coffeehouse stages, mentored by her sister Maura. Griffith's parents encouraged her to follow a practical career. Putting her musical hobby to one side she graduated from the University of Maryland in 1978 with a degree in physical therapy and embarked on a career as a physical therapist at what is now the Charles Regional Medical Center.

== Career ==
Several years after her college studies she was invited to sing for a local Irish band in Washington D.C. called “The Hags” and toured the college circuit for two years. Her successor in that band was the later to be famous singer-songwriter Mary Chapin Carpenter. In 1987 Griffith formed a duo called “Hazlewood” with songwriter Susan Graham White. They produced some independent releases and ultimately appeared at the 1991 Philadelphia Folk Festival.

Returning to her Celtic roots, Griffith formed an East Coast Celtic group called Connemara which she formed with fiddler/arranger Cathy Palmer along with harpist Tracie Brown. They were also joined on the albums by guitarist and multi-instrumentalist Zan McLeod. They released two albums, firstly Beyond Horizon in 1993 and Siren Song in 1995. Other musicians to participate on the projects were harpists Sue Richards, Julia Lane, Carol Thompson and Mary Fitzgerald along with box player Billy McComiskey and Jody Marshall on hammered dulcimer. In 1993 as a solo artist Griffith released her debut album Every Hue and Shade which came out on her own independent label.

When Blix Street Records were looking for an artist to succeed Ireland's Mary Black as their main project in the U.S., they signed Griffith on a long-term recording contract. They revamped her album Every Hue and Shade which became her label debut called Grace. In 1996 Blix Street also licensed the two Connemara recordings for distribution. Griffith completed two further albums with Minstrel Song, released in 2000, and followed by Sands of Time in 2003. Her album My Life in 2006 drew critical acclaim extending beyond her home base of Washington D.C.

Griffith has been called a singer's singer. One of her keen fans of her singing was the late Eva Cassidy. When Griffith came to know Eva's work, she encouraged Blix Street to sign her as well, which they did just after the release of her album Grace. Eva Cassidy was first and foremost a music lover sitting in the front row watching her musical heroes perform in Washington. She was also an avid fan of Griffith's, who spotted Eva's face at several of her concerts during the late 1980s and early 1990s. Griffith got to hear about Cassidy's talents and in 1996 made a drive to Potomac to see the then mystery girl at a small club in Alexandria, VA. By this time the Washington Area Association had awarded Griffith more than a dozen "Wammies", including “Best Female Vocalist” and “Best Album”. In September 1996 hearing of Eva Cassidy's illness she went to visit her. Griffith made a telephone call to Bill Straw, the president of Blix Street Records, explaining the situation, and two days later Griffith sent a tape of Cassidy's Live at Blues Alley album to him. On that tape was a recording of "Fields of Gold"; the song became Cassidy's big hit in what has become a phenomenal posthumous career. "All the colors of the rainbow, all life's palette of beauty and sadness and sweet passion and eternity — it was all there in that voice that came from that heart and those hands" said Griffith in interview when talking about Eva.

At the memorial service for Eva at Greenbelt Park, Griffith performed a haunting Celtic-tinged version of "Golden Thread".

During the next seven years the Eva Cassidy story unfolded whilst Griffith continued to toil in relative obscurity. In one of life's ironies, in 1998 Griffith was diagnosed with the degenerative neurological condition Parkinson's disease. It affected her life profoundly, but, although her voice was affected, she could still sing, but she had to give up playing whistle, guitar, and dulcimer and relied on musical friends to support her. In 2006 she released her fourth album "My Life", including two songs that held close family ties for her. "Bendemere's Stream" was a song she remembered her parents singing, and "Passing Thoughts" was written by her older brother, Fred Sisson. Sisson had been diagnosed with Parkinson's disease six years before Griffith, and embraced photography and poetry as a way to celebrate life and find new freedoms in his diminishing mobility. They shared a bond through their creativity and shared diagnoses, spending many hours together singing, talking and discussing poetry. Sisson died of Parkinson's disease on March 2, 2006.

At the World Parkinson's Congress in February 2006 she performed If I Can’t Dance from her album My Life, dedicating it to other fellow Parkinson's Disease sufferers.

In 2006, Griffith underwent pioneering surgery at Johns Hopkins Hospital in Baltimore, for the implantation of electrodes for deep brain stimulation. She benefited from the then experimental procedure and became an effective speaker and educator on Parkinson's. Over a period of time as the batteries ran down, her voice diminished. In March 2010, her doctors, though unable to assure her of a positive result, changed and upgraded the batteries, and it proved successful. Griffith had more energy and more voice. Griffith sang at the opening of the second World Parkinson Congress (September 28 – October 1, 2010) held in Glasgow, Scotland. Accompanied by Mark Cowan on guitar, she performed a traditional tune “The Seasons” (Scots pastoral song) along with “Sailing”, which was a hit for Rod Stewart. Griffith also spoke at a Music & Parkinson's Disease Workshop on the last day of the event.

On September 28, 2010, Blix Street Records released the compilation album Sailing with the intention that it would elevate this relatively unknown artist to her rightful place among her peers.

For the week commencing September 3, 2011, Griffith's song "My Life" was added to the BBC Radio 2 B Playlist.

== Musical career ==
=== Grace ===
Griffith's debut album with Blix Street Records released on August 6, 1996. It was a re-package of her 13 track independent record called Every Hue and Shade. On this 10 track recording it includes a take of the show tune “Summertime” from the George Gershwin opera Porgy and Bess and a cover of "Turning Away" written by Scottish singer-songwriter Dougie MacLean which appeared on his album Indigenous in 1999. It also contains a musical version of the W.B.Yeats poem "The Lake Isle of Innisfree".

=== Minstrel Song ===
On April 24, 2000 Griffith released this 10-track recording on the Blix Street Record label. It was produced by Grammy Award nominee Marcy Marxer. On this album which was a mixture of traditional and contemporary material Griffith interprets songs with arrangements ranging from sparse guitar and cello accompaniment to lush productions. She covers songs by Iris Dement ("My Life"), Jane Siberry ("Bound By The Beauty"), John Martyn ("May You Never") and Richard Farina ("Swallow Song").

=== Sands Of Time ===
On her third album with Blix Street Records, Griffith collaborates with former Eva Cassidy producer/band members, Chris Biondo and Lenny Williams along with Griffith's long-time friend producer/instrumentalist Marcy Marxer. It is essentially a collection of ballads which includes a cover of “Moment of Forever” written by Kris Kristofferson. The album was dedicated to Eva Cassidy.

=== My Life ===
On March 14, 2006, Griffith released My Life her fourth studio release for Blix Street Records and was again produced by Chris Biondo, Marcy Marxer and Lenny Williams. It consisted of twelve tracks which are all cover interpretations. The title track My Life was written by Iris Dement and appeared on her 1994 album My Life. The ninth track, the song "Passing Thoughts", written by Griffith's older brother Fred Sisson and set to music by her friend Carey Creed.

=== Sailing ===
On September 28, 2010 Blix Street Records released Sailing, which is an 11-track compilation package. The opening track "Wondering Where the Lions Are” was written by Bruce Cockburn and first appeared in 1979. The tenth track “Sailing/Ships Are Sailing” is a combination of a cover of the 1975 number one hit Sailing for Rod Stewart and "Ships are Sailing" the popular traditional Irish Reel.

=== Passing Through ===
After battling Parkinson's disease for more than 15 years, Griffith was determined to record one more album. On July 22, 2014 she did just that again with Blix Street. The tracks were mostly recorded a cappella, with generally sparse instruments added later. Griffith's former Hazlewood partner, Susan Graham White, added her voice to Griffith's new recording of Susan's "Brigid's Shield" and, for one more song, Hazlewood rides again! In addition to eight new recordings, the album includes 4 previously recorded but unreleased tracks that did not quite fit on their intended albums plus the bonus track, "Water Fire and Smoke."

== Discography ==
- 1996: Grace
- 2000: Minstrel Song
- 2003: Sands of Time
- 2006: My Life
- 2010: Sailing
- 2014: Passing Through
