= River of No Return (song) =

2009 single

"Kuon no Kawa"

Single by alan
- Released: April 8, 2009
- Genre: J-pop
- Label: Avex Trax
- Producer(s): Kikuchi Kazuhito

Alan singles chronology
| "'Gunjō no Tani'" (2009) | "Kuon no Kawa" (2009) | "'Ballad: Namonaki Koi no Uta'" (2009) |

"Kuon no Kawa" is the ninth Japanese single released by alan. The song is the theme song of the movie Red Cliff (Part II), released in Japan on April 10, 2009.

The single contains the Chinese version of the song, titled "Chibi: Da Jiangdong Qu", which was released in December 2008, before the movie's January release in most of East Asia. It also contains her seventh single "Red Cliff: Shin-Sen" and its Chinese version (also her second Chinese single) "Xin Zhan: Red Cliff".

Slightly different end roll versions of the songs are also included in the movie's original soundtracks, composed by Iwashiro Taro.

Kuon no Kawa was alan's first single to be in the top 10 weekly. On the sixth day of release, it suddenly jumped from #10 to #1 on the Oricon Singles Chart, her first #1 daily. This made her the first Chinese singer to reach #1 on the Oricon daily chart. It is also the first single by alan to pass the 30,000 units sold mark on the Oricon, beating "Red Cliff: Shin-Sen" by more than twice.

This single was nominated in the "Best Original Film Song" category in the 29th Hong Kong Film Awards.

== Track listing ==
=== CD ===
1. Kuon no Kawa (久遠の河; River of Eternity)
2. Chibi: Da Jiangdong Qu (赤壁 〜大江東去〜; Red Cliff: Great River Gone East)
3. Red Cliff: Shin-Sen (Red Cliff: 心・戦; Red Cliff: Heart . War)
4. Xin·Zhan: RED CLIFF (心・戰 ～RED CLIFF～; Heart . War: Red Cliff)
5. Kuon no Kawa (Instrumental)
6. Chibi: Da Jiangdong Qu (Instrumental).

=== CD (special theater version) ===
1. Kuon no Kawa
2. Chibi ~Da Jiangdong Qu~ (End Roll Version)

=== DVD ===
1. Kuon no Kawa (music video)
2. Red Cliff: Shin-Sen (music video)
