= Frank Rolfe =

Owner of US trailer parks

- Born: 1961 or 1962 (age 64–65)
- Occupations: Owner of US trailer parks, Mobile Home University

Frank Rolfe is the co-owner of the 6th largest mobile home parks business in the United States. He is also co-owner of Mobile Home University. His business model and the business model he teaches have been criticized as being unethical.

== Early career ==
Rolfe began working at a local advertising agency in Dallas, Texas during the summer while in high school. After graduating from St. Mark's School of Texas in 1979, Rolfe attended Stanford University, graduating with a degree in economics. Planning to gain experience for applying to business school, he went into the billboard business in the Dallas area. He became the largest private owner of billboards in the Dallas/Fort Worth area before selling to Clear Channel in 1996 for $5.8 million.

== Mobile home park business ==
In 1996, four months after selling his billboard business, Rolfe bought Glenhaven Mobile Home Park in Dallas for $400,000. By 2007, he had purchased and sold 24 mobile parks, which he has said earned him about as much as selling the billboard business. In 2006, Rolfe met David H. Reynolds at an industry conference. They became business partners and began buying mobile parks during and after the recession at a rate of about two dozen per year. As of 2015, the partners were ranked as the 6th largest owner of mobile home parks in the United States. Operating as privately held MHP Funds, they own about 11,000 lots in over 160 mobile parks. In 2013, their mobile parks generated $30 million in revenue, and over half was profit.

In 2014, The New York Times Magazine reported they typically spend several hundred thousand dollars fixing up the parks they purchase, calling them "the trailer-park equivalent of the developer who buys abandoned properties in the Bronx and converts them into livable places that are, at least, clean and safe." In 2015, The Guardian quoted Rolfe as saying "We traditionally raise our rents by an average of 10% a year or something like".

In 2015, advocacy groups in Austin, Texas helped residents of North Lamar Community Mobile Home Park successfully sue Rolfe and Reynolds over rent hikes and eviction notices, shortly after the two purchased the trailer park.

== Mobile Home University ==
Rolfe co-owns Mobile Home University, a three-day intensive course on the mobile home business taught once a month in locations around the United States. Rolfe and Reynolds both consider the course to be a hobby. While Rolfe and Reynolds originally both taught Mobile Home University, Rolfe is now the primary instructor.

The course costs approximately $2,000 and is a combination of classroom lecture and onsite tour visits to local mobile home communities. During the course, attendees are taught how to make a profit by purchasing mobile home parks. One concept taught during the course is how to increase rent rates as much as 10% per year, even if it is more than market rate, a practice that has received criticism. Course promotional materials have included, “With over 20% of American households now making $20,000 per year or less and another 10,000 baby boomers per day retiring into social security incomes that average $14,400 per year, the demand for affordable housing is giant," and “The fact that tenants can’t afford the $5,000 it takes to move a mobile home...makes it easy to raise rent without losing any occupancy.”

Course teachings include instructing would-be mobile home park owners, "What I've found...is the customers are stuck there. They don't have the option, they can't afford to move the trailer, they don't have the three grand. The only way they can object to your rent raise is to walk off and leave the trailer, in which case it becomes abandoned property, and you recycle it, put another person in it. So you really hold all the cards."

In an audio seminar titled "How To Buy, Operate, Turnaround And Sell A Mobile Home Park" Rolfe said "One of the big drivers to making money is the ability to increase the rent. If we didn't have them hostage, if they weren't stuck in those homes in the mobile home lots, it would be a whole different picture."

Courses include a "boot camp" which takes students on site visits of mobile home parks, which has sparked protest from park residents and local advocacy groups who say the course teaches unethical business practices. Rolfe has told course enrollees during site visits, “Don’t get too hung up on appearances...remember, you don’t have to live in these homes.”

An estimated 25-30% of Mobile Home University participants purchase mobile home parks.

== "Waffle House" quote ==
Rolfe compared owning a mobile home park where residents own the homes but rent the land to "a Waffle House where the customers are chained to the booths." In 2019, John Oliver called Rolfe "completely shameless about the degree to which his business depends on having a captive customer base," referencing the quote.

Rolfe said the quote had been taken out of context and was meant to compare the revenue streams from a mobile home park, which are dependable because residents who own their homes can't move if land rents are raised, due to the prohibitive expense of moving, to those customers at a restaurant, who are unpredictable because they have other options.
