= The Best of Prime Circle =

Greatest hits album by Prime Circle
- Released: 2007 South Africa
- Recorded: 2007
- Genre: Alternative rock
- Length: 63:38
- Label: David Gresham Records
- Producer: Ziggy

Prime Circle chronology
Live This Life (2005)	The Best of Prime Circle (2007)	All or Nothing (2008)

The Best of Prime Circle is a greatest hits of the South African band, Prime Circle.

== Track listing ==
=== CD ===
1. Moments (3:28)
2. Hello (3:43)
3. Live This Life (3:40)
4. As Long as I am Here [Café d'Afrique Mix] (4:21)
5. Same Goes for You (4:18)
6. Maybe Wrong (4:03)
7. Let Me Go (4:14)
8. Miracle (3:13)
9. My Inspiration (2:51)
10. Weaker Still [Exclusive Live Version] (3:56)
11. The Way it Could Be (3:31)
12. Can't Stop the Rain (3:44)
13. Father (3:14)
14. Shed My Skin (3:36)
15. Nice to Know You (3:23)
16. Same Goes for You [Acoustic] (4:12)
17. Let Me Go [Acoustic] (4:12)

=== DVD ===
1. Live This Life
2. The Way It Could Be
3. Hello
4. Take Me Up
5. Let Me Go
6. My Inspiration
7. Weaker Still
8. Fall Too Fast
9. Run Away
10. Same Goes for You
11. Maybe Wrong
12. Miracle
13. As Long as I Am Here
14. New Phase
15. Shed My Skin
