= My Life (Alan Dawa Dolma album) =

- CD cover

Studio album by Alan
- Released: November 25, 2009 (JP); November 27, 2009 (TW, HK)
- Recorded: 2009
- Genre: J-Pop
- Length: 62:00
- Label: Avex Trax
- Producer: Kazuhito Kikuchi

Alan chronology
Voice of Earth (2009)	My Life (2009)

Alternate cover
- CD+DVD Cover

Singles from My Life
- 1. "Kuon no Kawa" Released: April 8, 2009; 2. "Ballad (Namonaki Koi no Uta)" Released: September 2, 2009; 3. "Swear" Released: November 11, 2009

My Life is the second Japanese album by Alan, released in Japan on November 25, 2009, and in Taiwan and Hong Kong on November 27, 2009, under the literally translated title Wǒ de Rénshēng (Chinese: 我的人生). The album was released in two different editions: a CD+DVD edition and a CD-only edition. The first press of the CD+DVD edition came with three bonus videos, including special live studio session performances of "Nada Sōsō" and "Natsukashii Mirai (Longing Future)", and a remix of "Namida", the B-side from her seventh single "Megumi no Ame". First pressings of the CD-only edition came with a 40-page mini photobook. The album's titular song, "My Life", was used as the theme song for the PSP game God Eater. A pop version of "Essence of Me", called "Diamond", is an A-side on her 12th single, "Diamond/Over the Clouds". On track 11, "Nobody Knows But Me", the shakuhachi is played by former Rin' member Tomoca. Tomoca also made a guest appearance at Alan's debut concert, "Voice of You", playing the shakuhachi while Alan performed the song. The album peaked at #16 on the weekly Oricon charts, charting for seven weeks.

== Track listing ==
CD
No.	Title	Lyrics	Music	Arrangement	Length
1.	"Reflection (Overture)"		Yūta Nakano	Yūta Nakano	1:28
2.	"Swear"	Aico, Yuka Miyagawa	Kazuhito Kikuchi	Kei Kawano	4:50
3.	"One"	Hitomi Yaida	Alan, Kazuhito Kikuchi		4:19
4.	"Mitsumeteitai" (見つめていたい)	Kaito Okachimachi	Kazuhito Kikuchi	Akira Murata	4:51
5.	"Namida (Smooth Jam Mix)" (涙(Smooth Jam Mix) "Tears (Smooth Jam Mix)")	Tōko Furuuchi	Kazuhito Kikuchi	Akira Murata	4:17
6.	"Lost Child"	Kenn Kato	Alan, Kazuhito Kikuchi	Kei Kawano	4:35
7.	"Butterflies"	Shōko Fujiabayashi	Alan, Kazuhito Kikuchi	Shinta	4:42
8.	"Essence of Me"	Shōko Fujiabayashi	Kazuhito Kikuchi	Army Slick	3:50
9.	"Call My Name"	Kenko-p	Alan, Kazuhito Kikuchi	Akira Murata	5:02
10.	"Shiroi Tsubasa" (白い翼 "White Wings")	Kaito Okachimachi	Kazuhito Kikuchi	Akira Murata	4:43
11.	"Nobody Knows But Me"	Alan, Kazuhito Kikuchi	Alan	Akira Murata	4:52
12.	"Ballad (Namonaki Koi no Uta)"	Kenko-p	Kazuhito Kikuchi	Yūta Nakano	5:21
13.	"Kuon no Kawa"	Gorō Matsui	Tarō Iwashiro	Yūta Nakano	4:34
14.	"My Life"	Tōko Furuuchi	Kazuhito Kikuchi	Yūta Nakano	5:02
Total length:					62:00

DVD
No.	Title	Length
1.	"My Life"
2.	"Kuon no Kawa"
3.	"Ballad (Namonaki Koi no Uta)"
4.	"Swear"
5.	"Shiawase no Kane (2009 ver.)"
6.	"Offshot 2009"
7.	"Namida (Smooth Jam Mix)^{1}"
8.	"Natsukashii Mirai (Longing Future)^{1}"
9.	"Nada Sōsō^{1}"

- ^{1} From limited edition DVD 'Special Studio Live Session'.

== Charts ==
=== Japan ===
Chart	Peak position	Sales total
Oricon Daily Chart	8	
Oricon Weekly Chart	16	21,065
