= This Is My Life =

This Is My Life may refer to:

== Albums ==
- This Is My Life (soundtrack), by Carly Simon, 1992
- This Is My Life (Shirley Bassey album), a U.S. and UK release, 1968
  - This Is My Life (La vita), an Italian release by Shirley Bassey, 1968
- This Is My Life, by Joe Dolan, 1987
- This Is My Life, by Tracy Hamlin, 2013

== Songs ==
- "This Is My Life" (Anna Bergendahl song), 2010
- "This Is My Life" (Edward Maya song), 2008
- "This Is My Life" (Elli Erl song), 2004
- "This Is My Life" (Eurobandið song), 2008
- "This Is My Life" ("La vita"), written by Bruno Canfora and Antonio Amurri in 1968, with English lyrics by Norman Newell
- "This Is My Life", by Dei Hamo from First Edition, 2005
- "This Is My Life", by Eartha Kitt, 1986
- "This Is My Life", by Fefe Dobson from Sunday Love, 2006
- "This Is My Life", by Gasolin' from Efter endnu en dag, 1976
- "This Is My Life", by Hopsin, Ak'Sent, Tynisha Keli and Donte "Burger" Winston from the soundtrack of the film Fame, 2009
- "This Is My Life", by Joana Zimmer, theme of the German telenovela Rote Rosen, 2006
- "This Is My Life", by Lisa Loeb, from A Simple Trick to Happiness, 2020
- "This Is My Life", by Phil Vassar from Prayer of a Common Man, 2007
- "This Is My Life", by Tom Jones from Mr. Jones, 2002
- "This Is My Life", by Tubeway Army from The Plan, 1984

== Films ==
- This Is My Life (1952 film), an Argentine film directed by Román Viñoly Barreto
- This Is My Life (1992 film), an American comedy-drama directed by Nora Ephron
- Uuno Turhapuro – This Is My Life, a 2004 Finnish comedy directed by Ere Kokkonen

== See also ==
- My Life (disambiguation)
- It's My Life (disambiguation)
- The Story of My Life (disambiguation)
- This Is the Life (disambiguation)
- This Is Your Life (disambiguation)
