= DJ Clock =

South African DJ and record producer

- Born: Kholile Elvin Gumede; 16 May 1988 (age 37)
- Origin: Vosloorus, South Africa
- Genres: Afro house; House
- Occupations: DJ; record producer
- Instrument: Keyboards
- Years active: 2008–present
- Labels: AM-PM Productions

Kholile Elvin Gumede (born 16 May 1988), better known as DJ Clock, is a South African DJ and record producer.

== Career ==
=== 2007-2010: The First Tick (2008), The Second Tick (2009) ===
His first album The First Tick was released on 6 January 2008 in South Africa.

At the South Africa Music Awards (2008), The First Tick was nominated for SAMA Awards, as the Best Urban Dance Album and his single "Umahamba Yedwa" as Record of the Year.

After he established his owned record label ÄM-PM Productions, his album second studio album The Second Tick was released in 2009.

=== 2010-2014: The Third Tick (2010); The 4th Tick: Clockumentary (2014) ===
His third studio album The Third Tick was released in July 2010, features Rockboys, DJ Cleo, Bantu Soul, Mpho Maboi.

He signed his label AM-PM production with Universal Music South Africa, and released his fourth studio album The 4th Tick: Clockumentary, which was commercial success certified platinum by the Recording Industry of South Africa (RISA).

== Discography ==
=== Albums ===
- The First Tick (2008)
- The Second Tick (2009)
- The Third Tick (2010)
- The 4th Tick: Clockumentary (2014)
- The 5th Tick (2016)

== Awards and nominations ==
Awards	Year	Category	Nominated work	Result
10th Metro FM Music Awards	2010	Hit Single of the Year	DNB BEAT	Nominated
21st South African Music Awards	2015	SAMPRA Award	"Pluto (Remember You)"	Won
21st South African Music Awards	2015	Best Selling Mobile Music Download	"Pluto (Remember You)"	Won
21st South African Music Awards	2015	Best Selling Ring-Back Tone	"Pluto (Remember You)"	Won
21st South African Music Awards	2015	Best Selling Full-Track Download	"Pluto (Remember You)"	Won
21st South African Music Awards	2015	Best Collaboration	Beatenberg and DJ Clock	Nominated
21st South African Music Awards	2015	Best Dance Album	The 4th Tick: A Clockumentary – DJ Clock	Nominated
