= Kristian Leontiou =

English singer (born 1982)

- Born: February 1982 (age 44); London, England
- Genres: Pop, adult contemporary
- Occupation: Singer
- Years active: 2004–present
- Label: Polydor

Kristian Leontiou (born February 1982) is an English singer. Formerly a solo artist, he is the lead singer of indie rock band One eskimO.

== Early life ==
Kristian Leontiou was born in London, England and is of Greek Cypriot descent. He went to Hatch End High School in Harrow and worked several jobs in and around London whilst concentrating on music when he had any free time. In 2003 he signed a major record deal with Polydor. At the time, Leontiou was dubbed "the new Dido" by some media outlets. His debut single "Story of My Life" was released in June 2004 and reached #9 in the UK Singles Chart. His second single "Shining" peaked at #13 whilst the album Some Day Soon was certified gold selling in excess of 150,000 copies.

Leontiou toured the album in November 2004 taking him to the US to work with L.A Reid, Chairman of the Island Def Jam music group. Unhappy with the direction his career was going, on a flight back from the US in 2004 he decided to take his music in a new direction. Splitting from his label, he went on to collaborate with Faithless on the song "Hope & Glory" for their album ‘'To All New Arrivals'’. It was this release that saw him unleash the One eskimO moniker. It was through working with Rollo Armstrong on the Faithless album, that Rollo got to hear an early demo of "Astronauts" from the One eskimO project. Being more than impressed by what he heard, Rollo opened both his arms and studio doors to Leontiou and they began to co-produce the ‘'All Balloons’' album.

It was at this time that he paired up with good friend Adam Falkner, a drummer/musician, to introduce a live acoustic sound to the album. They recorded the album with engineer Phill Brown (engineer for Bob Marley and Robert Plant) at Ark studios in St John's Wood where they recorded live then headed back to Rollo's studio to add the cinematic electro touches that are prominent on the album.

Shortly after its completion, One eskimO's "Hometime" was used on a Toyota Prius advert in the USA. The funds from the advert were then used to develop the visual aspect of One eskimO. He teamed up with friend Nathan Erasmus (Gravy Media Productions) along with animation team Smuggling Peanuts (Matt Latchford and Lucy Sullivan) who together began to develop the One eskimO world, the first animation produced was for the track ‘Hometime’ which went on to win a British animation award in 2008.

In 2008 Leontiou started a new management venture with ATC Music. By mid-2008 Time Warner came on board to develop all 10 One eskimO animations which were produced the highly regarded Passion Pictures in London.

Leontiou released a cover version of Tracy Chapman's "Fast Car", which was originally released as a single in 2005. Leontiou's version was unable to chart, however, due to there being no simultaneous physical release alongside the download single, a UK chart rule that was in place at the time. On 24 April 2011, the song entered the singles chart at number 88 due to Britain's Got Talent contestant Michael Collings covering the track on the show on 16 April 2011.

== Discography ==
=== Albums ===
Year	Album details	Peak chart positions	Certifications (sales thresholds)
Year	Album details	UK	Certifications (sales thresholds)
2004	Some Day Soon: Released: 31 May 2004 - (#14); Re-released: 4 April 2005 - (#86); Label: Polydor; Formats: CD, Digital download	14	BPI: Gold

=== Singles ===
Year	Title	Peak chart positions		Album
Year	Title	UK	CIS	Album
2004	"Story of My Life"	9	3	Some Day Soon
2004	"Shining"	13	13	Some Day Soon
2004	"Some Say"	54	20	Some Day Soon
2005	"Fast Car"^{[A]}	88	—	Some Day Soon
"—" denotes items which were not released in that country or failed to chart.

Notes

- ^{A} - Originally released as a single in April 2005, Leontiou's version of "Fast Car" did not chart until 2011 in the UK.

=== Also featured on ===
- Now That's What I Call Music! 58 _{(Story of My Life)}
- Win a Date with Tad Hamilton! OST, Love Love Songs - The Ultimate Love Collection _{(Shining)}
- Summerland OST _{(The Crying)}
