= Lulu Dikana =

South African singer (1978–2014)

- Lulu Dikana in 2014

Background information
- Also known as: Lulu
- Born: Lungisa Dikana; 18 December 1978; Kwazakhele, Eastern Cape, Port Elizabeth, South Africa
- Died: 3 December 2014 (aged 35)
- Genres: R&B, Pop, afrosoul
- Occupations: singer-songwriter, vocalist
- Instrument: Vocals
- Years active: 1998–2014
- Label: Sony

Lungisa Dikana (18 December 1978 – 3 December 2014) was a South African recording artist and vocalist. Her music career shot to limelight in 2008 following the release of her debut album My Diary, My Thoughts. She died on 3 December 2014 after a short illness.

== Life and career ==
Born into a family of musicinas in Kwazakhele, a small town in Eastern Cape, Port Elizabeth, Lulu began singing as a chorister in her local church at the age of 15. Her father, Vuyiselie Dikana was a drummer for a band known as "Black Slave and the Flamingo". An alumna of Fort Hare University where she studied Law, Lulu released her debut album titled My Diary, My Thoughts in 2008 produced by Nigerian-born music producer Wilson Joel . The album contained hit tracks like "Real Love" and "Life and Death".

Following the success of her debut album, Lulu began working on her second album This Is the Life. The album was released in 2011 and went on to be nominated in three categories at the 2013 Metro FM Music Awards and "Best R&B/Soul/Reggae Album" category at the 19th South African Music Awards. In October 2014, she released I Came To Love, her third studio album which earned her three nomination spots at the 21st South African Music Awards.

== Death ==
In 2009, Lulu was diagnosed of oesophageal perforation and underwent five oesophagus operations. On 3 December 2014, she died in a hospital in South Africa after a short illness.

== Discography ==
- My Diary, My Thoughts
- This Is The Life
- I Came to Love

== Awards and nominations ==
Year	Award ceremony	Prize	Nominated work/Recipient	Result	Ref
2013	19th South African Music Awards	Best R&B / Soul / Reggae Album	This Is the Life	Nominated	
2013	19th South African Music Awards	Female Artist of the Year	Herself	Nominated	
2013	12th Metro FM Music Awards	Best Produced Album	This Is the Life	Nominated	
2013	12th Metro FM Music Awards	Best Female Album	This Is the Life	Nominated	
2013	12th Metro FM Music Awards	Best Contemporary Jazz Album	This Is the Life	Nominated	
2015	14th Metro FM Music Awards	Best Female Album	I Came to Love	Nominated	
2015	21st South African Music Awards	Female Artist of the Year	Herself	Nominated	
2015	21st South African Music Awards	Best R&B / Soul / Reggae Album	I Came to Love	Nominated	
2015	21st South African Music Awards	Best Producer of the Year	Herself (with Powella Tiemo)	Nominated	

== Personal life ==
Until her death, Lulu was a born-again Christian and devoted to God. She was committed to the works of God and took going to church serious. She is the older sister of Zonke, a South African singer-songwriter and record producer. She had a son before her death.
