= Swear (Alan song) =

- CD single cover

Single by Alan

from the album My Life
- B-side: "Beauty"
- Released: November 4, 2009
- Recorded: 2009
- Genre: J-pop, R&B
- Length: 18:13
- Label: Avex Trax
- Songwriter(s): Ypenus
- Producer(s): Kazuhito Kikuchi

Alan singles chronology
"Ballad (Namonaki Koi no Uta)" (2009)	"Swear" (2009)	"Diamond/Over the Clouds" (2010)

"Swear" is a song recorded by Chinese singer Alan. "Swear" was written by Aico and Yuka Miyagawa and was produced by Kazuhito Kikuchi. The song was used as the theme song of Bourbon's Blanchul Mini Series commercial, in which Alan appears. The PV for the single was shot at Keisei Rose Garden. The B-side, "Beauty", was used as the commercial song for Yomeishu's Re:on Nutrition Drink Product. "Swear" was released as a truetone on September 17, 2009 and was released as a single on the Avex Trax label on November 4, 2009. "Swear" reached a peak of #35 on the weekly Oricon charts, and charted for three weeks.

== Promotion ==
To promote the single, Alan appeared on Music Japan and sang "Swear". She also performed the song on Music Station.

== Track listing ==
No.	Title	Lyrics	Music	Length
1.	"Swear"	Yuka Miyagawa, Aico	Kazuhito Kikuchi	04:47
2.	"Beauty"	Ayako Ikeda	K. Kikuchi	04:21
3.	"Swear" (instrumental)			04:47
4.	"Beauty" (instrumental)			04:18

DVD track list
No.	Title	Length
1.	"Swear" (music video)	04:50
2.	"Swear" (music video; alternative version)	03:13
