= Hello Crazy World =

Studio album by Prime Circle
- Released: July 2002
- Genre: Rock, Alternative
- Label: David Gresham Records

Prime Circle chronology
Hello Crazy World (2002)	Live This Life (2005)

Hello Crazy World is a 2002 album by South African rock band Prime Circle. A two-disc special edition of the album was released in 2003. The album spawned hits such as "Hello", "Same Goes For You", "Let Me Go", and "My Inspiration".

== Track listing ==
1. "Same Goes For You" – 4:15
2. "Hello" – 3:40
3. "As Long As I Am Here" – 3:29
4. "Crazy World" – 3:44
5. "Inside Out" – 3:56
6. "Standing" – 2:48
7. "Father" – 3:09
8. "Shed My Skin" – 3:32
9. "My Inspiration" – 2:47
10. "Nice To Know You" – 3:20
11. "In My Head" – 3:12
12. "Lose tomorrow" – 2:58
13. "Let Me Go" – 4:14
14. "Weaker Still" – 3:23

=== Disc 2 Special Edition Tracks ===
1. "Daydreamer (What Are You On)" – 3:46
2. "Same Goes For You (Acoustic Mix)" – 4:10
3. "Hello (Acoustic Mix)" – 3:54
4. "Let Me Go (Acoustic Mix)" – 4:11
5. "My Inspiration (Acoustic Mix)" – 2:56
