= Evidence (Prime Circle album) =

Studio album by Prime Circle
- Released: 2012
- Genre: Alternative rock

Prime Circle chronology
Jekyll & Hyde (2010)	Evidence (2012)

Singles from Evidence
- 1. "Time Kills Us All" Released: October 2012; 2. "Evidence" Released: January 2013

Evidence is the fifth studio album by South African rock band Prime Circle. It was released in 2012. The album was licensed through EMI Music South Africa for that country. Internationally other specialised labels were selected to distribute the album. It is the follow-up to the album Jekyll & Hyde (2010). The album was recorded in Cape Town, South Africa between the months of February and June 2012. Evidence was officially announced in June 2012 via the band's official Facebook page and website.

== Style and lyrics ==
Lead singer-songwriter and guitarist Ross Learmonth stated in an interview that the album was about trying to let go of something when "evidence" of it is left behind. Lyrically the album stays consistent with that of the previous releases. The lyrics focus mainly on the breakdowns of relationships from a positive perspective. The lyrics also deal with themes such as, innocence, changes, taking things for granted, isolation, and belonging. Stylistically the album draws from previous releases such as Jekyll & Hyde (2010) with darker tone songs such as "Evidence". The album also incorporates rock ballads such as "Written in Riddles" and "Know You Better" similar to those from All or Nothing (2008) and Live This Life (2005).

== Singles ==
"Time Kills Us All" was released as the album's first single. It made its debut on radio stations across South Africa in October 2012. A music video for the track was released in June 2013. The video was filmed in Cape Town, South Africa and focused on the end of the world as the main theme. Following the success of "Time Kills Us All" the band released their second single, the title track "Evidence". The second single was released in January 2013. The single was accompanied by the release of the music video for the song. The video dealt with themes such as interrogation, isolation, accusation, and events from the past affecting the present.

== Track listing ==
No.	Title	Lyrics	Music	Producer(s)	Length
1.	"Intro"	Prime Circle	Prime Circle, Theo Crous	Theo Crous	0:57
2.	"Evidence"	Prime Circle	Prime Circle, Theo Crous	Theo Crous	3:13
3.	"Change"	Prime Circle	Prime Circle, Theo Crous	Theo Crous	2:54
4.	"Time Kills Us All"	Prime Circle	Prime Circle	Theo Crous	3:41
5.	"Answers"	Prime Circle	Prime Circle, Theo Crous	Theo Crous	3:34
6.	"Know You Better"	Prime Circle	Prime Circle, Theo Crous	Theo Crous	3:30
7.	"King for a Day"	Prime Circle	Prime Circle, Theo Crous	Theo Crous	3:23
8.	"Room Of Ghosts"	Prime Circle	Prime Circle, Theo Crous	Theo Crous	3:33
9.	"Staring at Satellites"	Prime Circle	Prime Circle, Theo Crous	Theo Crous	3:46
10.	"Only Way Out"	Prime Circle	Prime Circle, Theo Crous	Theo Crous	3:49
11.	"Given The Truth"	Prime Circle	Prime Circle, Theo Crous	Theo Crous	2:53
12.	"Written in Riddles"	Prime Circle	Prime Circle, Theo Crous	Theo Crous	2:53
13.	"Evidence (Acoustic Version)"	Prime Circle	Prime Circle, Theo Crous	Theo Crous	3:22

== Personnel ==
- Ross Learmoth – vocals, rhythm guitar, Acoustic guitar, songwriter
- Marco Gomes – bass, songwriter
- Dale Schnettler – drums, backing vocals, Acoustic guitar, percussion, songwriter
- Dirk Bisschoff – lead guitar, Acoustic guitar, songwriter
- Neil Breytenbach – keyboards, songwriter

== Credits ==
- Theo Crous – Producer
- Kevin "The Caveman" Shirley – Mixer
- Neil Breytenbach – String Arrangements
- Theo Crous – String arrangements (Except "Time Kills Us All")
