= Let the Night In =

Let The Night In

Studio album by Prime Circle
- Released: 13 June 2014
- Recorded: 2014 at M5 & M2 Studios, Johannesburg, South Africa
- Genre: Alternative rock; Pop rock
- Label: Prime Records
- Producer: Denholm Harding

Prime Circle chronology
Evidence (2012)	Let The Night In (2014)	If You Don't You Never Will (2017)

Singles from Let The Night In
- 1. "Gone" Released: May 2014; 2. "Doors" Released: August 2014

Let The Night In is the sixth studio album by South African rock band Prime Circle. It was released worldwide via iTunes on June 13, 2014 through the band's newly formed label, Prime Records. This album is the follow-up to the band's 2012 offering, Evidence (2012). The album was officially announced on April 25, 2014 via the band's official social media pages and website. The first single "Gone" was released on 21 May 2014 on the announcement of the album's iTunes pre-order listing, with Gone available for immediate download.

The album was supported by the band's first South African arena tour, which included dates at the Teatro Theatre at Montecasino in Johannesburg (18/19 July 2014), Cape Town's Grand Arena, Grandwest (9 August 2014) and Bloemfontein's Sand du Plessis Theatre (31 July & 1 August 2014). The band embarked on a European tour in June 2014 in support of the album including dates in Spain, France and Belgium where they performed at Graspop Festival. In October the band returns to Germany to tour the album extensively across the country.

== Singles ==
"Gone" was released as the album's first single on 21 May 2014 and immediately entered the charts across South Africa. The second single, "Doors", was released on 21 August 2014.

== Track listing ==
No.	Title	Length
1.	"Let the Night In"	3:34
2.	"Gone"	2:57
3.	"My City"	4:33
4.	"Doors"	3:16
5.	"Before the Fire Burns Out"	3:36
6.	"The Fallout"	4:04
7.	"Yeah"	3:18
8.	"Bastards"	3:31
9.	"On Top of the World"	2:51
10.	"Blame It On Me"	3:27
11.	"Not Alone"	3:16
12.	"I Am"	3:27
13.	"Batten Down the Hatches"	4:10
