= This Is the Life =

This Is the Life may refer to:

== Music ==
=== Albums ===
- This Is the Life (Amy Macdonald album), or the title song (see below), 2007
- This Is the Life (Duane Steele album), or the title song, 1997
- This Is the Life (Farmer's Daughter album), or the title song, 1998
- This Is the Life (Lulu Dikana album), or the title song, 2009
- This Is the Life (Ricky Ross album), or the title song, 2002
- This Is the Life!, by Norm Lewis, 2008

=== Songs ===
- "This Is the Life" (Amy Macdonald song)
- "This Is the Life" (Hannah Montana song), by Miley Cyrus, performing as Hannah Montana
- "This Is the Life" by "Weird Al" Yankovic from Dare to Be Stupid
- "This Is the Life", by The Dismemberment Plan from The Dismemberment Plan Is Terrified
- "This Is the Life", by Dream Theater from A Dramatic Turn of Events
- "This Is the Life", by E-40 from The Block Brochure: Welcome to the Soil 2
- "This Is the Life", by Irving Berlin
- "This Is the Life", by Jim Jones from Pray IV Reign
- "This Is the Life", by Living Colour from Time's Up
- "This Is the Life", by the Outlawz from Novakane
- "This Is the Life", by Rick Ross from Trilla
- "This Is the Life", by Two Door Cinema Club from Tourist History
- "This Is the Life", from the musical Golden Boy
- "This Is the Life", from the musical Love Life

== Television and film ==
- This Is the Life, a 1914 American film directed by Lloyd Ingraham
- This Is the Life, a 1915 American film starring Adele Farrington
- This Is the Life (1933 film), a film directed by Albert de Courville
- This Is the Life (1935 film), a musical starring Jane Withers
- This Is the Life (1944 film), a film starring Donald O'Connor
- This Is the Life (2008 film), a documentary about the Good Life Cafe hip hop scene
- This Is the Life (TV series), an American Christian television dramatic anthology series

== Literature ==
- This Is the Life!, 1926 autobiography by cartoonist Walt McDougall
- This Is the Life, 1991 novel by Joseph O'Neill

== See also ==
- This Is th'Life, a 1914 American film
- "Is This the Life", a 1988 song by Cardiacs
