= My Life (Grace Griffith album) =

Studio album by Grace Griffith
- Released: March 14, 2006
- Recorded: Williams & Biondo Studio, Kensington, Maryland, Community Music Studio
- Genre: Folk
- Length: 45:20
- Label: Blix Street
- Producer: Chris Biondo, Marcy Marxer, Lenny Williams

Grace Griffith chronology
Sands Of Time (2003)	My Life (2006)	Sailing (2010)

My Life is the fourth studio release for American artist Grace Griffith. The album was released March 14, 2006, on Blix Street Records and was produced by Chris Biondo, Marcy Marxer and Lenny Williams who were long-time associates of Griffith who were the production team behind her previous album Sands Of Time. Chris Biondo credits as a producer include Eva Cassidy who also recorded with the record label.

== Background ==
My Life was recorded at two separate studios and consisted of twelve tracks. They are all cover interpretations. The title track My Life was written by Iris Dement on her 1994 album My Life which was nominated for a Grammy in the Best Contemporary Folk Album category. Griffith first recorded it on her Minstrel Song album in 2003. On this recording strings were added and ultimately it became the title track as it set the tone for the album's central theme of the all-healing power of love, hope and inspiration.

Shape Of My Heart written by Sting and Dominic Miller) appeared on Sting's 1993 album Ten Summoner's Tales. For the album Griffith choose an eclectic mix of styles adapting poems, traditional (fourth track The Cuckoo) and contemporary songs. Track seven Song For A Winter's Night was written by Canadian singer-songwriter Gordon Lightfoot.

The poem and ninth track Passing Thoughts was written by her older brother Fred Sisson and set to music by Carey Creed. Diagnosed with Parkinson's disease six years before Griffith, Sisson left his government job to devote himself to photography and poetry. According to Griffith, it's not unusual for people with Parkinson's to spout creative wings and celebrate life in and with new directions.

The tenth track If I Can't Dance was a song she performed at the World Parkinson's Congress in February 2006 which Griffith dedicated to other fellow Parkinson's Disease sufferers.

"MY LIFE feels different than any of my other albums," explains Griffith. "It was recorded during a time of profound change in how I define myself. A lot of that change has its origins in my experience with Parkinson's Disease. This album is not about sweating the small stuff. It's about embracing the big stuff—like comforting someone or making them smile, savoring the light of a candle on a winter's night or the sunlight in the whispering summer leaves on a walk in the woods. This album is about connection and how essential connection is to our survival and growth as human beings. I think I've gone a bit further into the dark side of living than on my other albums, but I'm hoping this eyes-wide-open look at struggle makes the beacon—the light of love in a friend's eyes or the spark to dance in the face of an avalanche—shine more brightly."

== Critical reception ==
Professional ratings
Review scores
Source	Rating
Allmusic	4/5 stars

Jonathan Widran of Allmusic gave the album four out of five stars. Widran said that Griffith's voice had an "ethereal, emotional magic of Sarah McLachlan", and he made comparisons to the late Eva Cassidy because of the albums "exquisite and haunting" values the fact that My Life was recorded for Blix Street, the label that made Cassidy a "posthumous phenomenon". Wildran also pointed out the sadder connection in that "Griffith has been battling Parkinson's Disease since 1998, and who knows how much longer her voice will be as stunning and pure as it is here? " He said that listeners would pay attention to the "heartbreaking, inspiring opening ballad, My Life ". He went on to say that "If this is the last heard from Griffith on disc, it will indeed be a tragedy "

== Track listing ==
No.	Title	Writer(s)	Length
1.	"My Life"	Iris DeMent	3:07
2.	"Hills of Shiloh"	James Friedman, Shel Silverstein	3:32
3.	"Calling All Angels"	Jane Siberry	4:04
4.	"The Cuckoo"	Traditional	3:44
5.	"Love Is On Our Side"	Tish Hinojosa	3:42
6.	"Shape Of My Heart"	Sting, Dominic James Miller	4:22
7.	"Song For A Winter's Night"	Gordon Lightfoot	4:02
8.	"Garden of Mysteries"	Mark A.Simos	4:01
9.	"Passing Thoughts"	Fred Sisson	3:52
10.	"If I Can't Dance"	Jennifer Berezan	4:03
11.	"Crossing Over"	Susan Graham White	3:39
12.	"Bendemere's Stream"	Thomas Moore, Traditional tune	3:08

== Personnel ==
Musicians

- Grace Griffith – lead vocals, harmony vocals, alto recorder
- Chris Biondo – bass guitar
- Marcy Marxer – mandolin, guitar, percussion, harmony vocal, pennywhistle
- Lenny Williams - piano
- Al Petteway - guitar, harmony vocal
- Roger Scott Craig – Piano, synthesizer, synthesised strings
- Anderson Allen – Zabumda-Brazilian drum
- Carey Creed – piano
- Jon Carrol – piano
- Mark Evans – strings
- Cathy Fink – banjo, harmony vocals
- Ralph Gordon – standup bass
- Paul Henry – bass guitar
- Jody Marshall – hammered dulcimer
- Zan Marshall – bouzouki, guitar, mandolin
- Richard Miller – nylon stringed guitar
- Jennifer Mondie – strings
- Richie Simpkins - fiddle
- Amy White - harmony vocals
- Ann Louise White - harmony vocals
- Jesse Winch – bodhran
- Rhonda Winter - pennywhistle

Technical personnel

- Irene Young - photography
- Lois Gerard - graphic Design
