= Story of My Life (Kristian Leontiou song) =

2004 single by Kristian Leontiou

Single by Kristian Leontiou

from the album Some Day Soon
- B-side: "Homecoming"
- Released: 24 May 2004
- Studio: Western Boulevard (Nottingham, England)
- Length: 3:30
- Label: Polydor
- Songwriter(s): Sarah Erasmus; Pete Wilkinson; Kristian Leontiou
- Producer(s): Ash Howes; Pete Wilkinson

Kristian Leontiou singles chronology
"Story of My Life" (2004)	"Shining" (2004)

"Story of My Life" is a song by British singer Kristian Leontiou, written by Leontiou, Sarah Erasmus, and Pete Wilkinson and released as Leontiou's debut single on 24 May 2004. The song was produced by Ash Howes and Wilkinson and features backing vocals from Wilkinson and Erasmus. Issued as the lead single from Leontiou's first studio album, Some Day Soon (2004), "Story of My Life" reached number nine on the UK Singles Chart and also charted in Germany, the Netherlands, and the Commonwealth of Independent States (CIS), where it reached number two on the region's airplay chart. In Russia, it was the most successful airplay hit of 2004.

== Reception ==
=== Critical ===
British columnist James Masterton called "Story of My Life" a "captivating" track and wrote that the song "catches the ear and the heartstrings from the moment you hear it".

=== Commercial ===
Upon the song's release in the United Kingdom, "Story of My Life" debuted at its peak of number nine on 30 May 2004, spending a total of seven weeks on the UK Singles Chart. In mainland Europe, the song appeared on the singles charts of Germany and the Netherlands. It first charted in the latter country, debuting at number 98 on the Single Top 100 on 2 October 2004. Despite charting no higher than number 82, the song lingered on the chart for 16 weeks, dropping out of the top 100 in January 2005. On 27 December 2004, the song debuted on the German Singles Chart at number 82, rising to its peak of number 70 on 24 January 2005; it spent a further four weeks on the German chart, tallying nine weeks on the listing altogether. The song was an airplay hit in the Commonwealth of Independent States, debuting within the top 300 in July 2004 and taking 13 weeks to ascend to its peak of number two in late September. It was the region's eighth-most-successful song of 2004. The single was particularly successful in Russia, where it reached number one and was the most successful radio hit of 2004.

== Track listings ==
UK CD single

1. "Story of My Life"
2. "Homecoming"

German maxi-CD single

1. "Story of My Life" – 3:43
2. "Homecoming" – 3:52
3. "Sometimes I Wonder" – 3:25
4. "Story of My Life" (CD-ROM video)

== Credits and personnel ==
Credits are lifted from the UK CD single liner notes.

Studio

- Vocals recorded at Western Boulevard Studios (Nottingham, England)

Personnel

- Kristian Leontiou – writing, lead vocals
- Sarah Erasmus – writing, background vocals
- Pete Wilkinson – writing, background vocals, keyboards, production, strings and percussion arrangement, original programming
- Seton Daunt – guitar
- Ash Howes – additional drums, production
- Chris Lord-Alge – mixing
- Keith Udden – additional programming and engineering
- Mark Gamble – vocal recording

== Charts ==
=== Weekly charts ===
Chart (2004–2005)	Peak position
CIS Airplay (TopHit)	2
Germany (GfK)	70
Netherlands (Single Top 100)	82
Russia Airplay (TopHit)	1
Scotland (OCC)	6
UK Singles (OCC)	9

=== Year-end charts ===
Chart (2004)	Position
CIS Airplay (TopHit)	8
Russia Airplay (TopHit)	1
UK Singles (OCC)	173

== Release history ==
Region	Date	Format	Label	Ref.
United Kingdom	24 May 2004	CD	Polydor	
