= Live This Life =

Studio album by Prime Circle
- Released: 2005
- Genres: Rock, alternative
- Label: David Gresham Records

Prime Circle chronology
| Hello Crazy World (2002) | Live This Life (2005) | The Best of Prime Circle (2007) |

Live This Life is a 2005 album by South African rock band Prime Circle. The album spawned hits such as "Live This Life", "Miracle", and "Maybe Wrong".

== Track listing ==
1. "Live This Life" –3:38
2. "Miracle" –3:11
3. "The Way It Could Be" –3:29
4. "Take Me Up" –3:46
5. "I Don't Know" –2:55
6. "Bring Me Down" –3:45
7. "Miss You" –3:55
8. "Always Surrounded" –4:09
9. "Maybe Wrong" –4:01
10. "Run Away" –3:18
11. "Fall Too Fast" –4:09
12. "Can't Stop the Rain" –3:42
13. "New Phase" –4:24

== Living in a Crazy World DVD/CD ==
Living in a Crazy World

Video by Prime Circle
- Released: 2007
- Genres: Rock, alternative

On the 26th June 2006, prime circle released their live DVD "Living in a crazy world" and was later followed by their audio CD/DVD in 2007 containing tracks from Hello Crazy World and Live This life.
