= The Story of My Life =

The Story of My Life or Story of My Life may refer to:

== Literature ==
- The Story of My Life (biography), a 1903 autobiography by Helen Keller
- Story of My Life (novel), a 1988 novel by Jay McInerney
- Histoire de ma vie (Story of My Life), a 1789 memoir and autobiography by Giacomo Casanova
- Histoire de ma vie (George Sand) (Story of a Life), an 1855 autobiography by George Sand
- The Story of My Life, a 1919 autobiography by Alma Bridwell White
- The Story of My Life, a 1932 autobiography by Clarence Darrow
- The Story of My Life, a 1942 autobiography by Rosina Davies
- Povest o Zhizni (Story of a Life), a 1963 autobiography by Konstantin Paustovsky

== Music ==
=== Songs ===
- "The Story of My Life" (Marty Robbins song), 1957
- "The Story of My Life" (Millencolin song), 1995
- "Story of My Life" (Kristian Leontiou song), 2004
- "Story of My Life" (Lesley Roy song), 2020
- "Story of My Life" (One Direction song), 2013
- "Story of My Life" (Rich Croin song), 2008
- "Story of My Life" (Smash Mouth song), 2006
- "Story of My Life" (Social Distortion song), 1990
- "Historyja majho žyccia" ("Story of My Life"), a 2017 song by Naviband
- "The Story of My Life", a song by Neil Diamond from the 1986 album Headed for the Future
- "The Story of My Life", a song by White Town from the 2000 album Peek & Poke
- "Story of My Life", a song by Automatic Loveletter from the 2010 album Truth or Dare
- "Story of My Life", a 2009 song by Billy Blue featuring Akon
- "Story of My Life", a song by Bon Jovi from the 2005 album Have A Nice Day
- "Story of My Life", a 2021 song by Illenium and Sueco featuring Trippie Redd
- "Story of My Life", a song by Loretta Lynn from the 2004 album Van Lear Rose

=== Albums ===
- Story of My Life (album), by Pere Ubu, 1993
- The Story of My Life (Deana Carter album), 2005
- The Story of My Life (Gangsta Pat album), 1997
- The Story of My Life (Irma Thomas album), 1997
- The Story of My Life, a 2008 album by Eric Gales
- Story of My Life, a 2016 album by Cita Citata
- Story of My Life, a 1970 album by Marty Robbins

== Other uses ==
- The Story of My Life (film), a 2004 French romantic comedy film
- The Story of My Life (musical), a 2006 musical by Brian Hill

== See also ==
- My Life Story, an English pop group
- My Life (disambiguation)
