= Shengsheng Zui Rulan =

Shēngshēng Zuì Rúlán

Studio album by alan
- Released: August 15, 2005
- Recorded: 2005
- Genre: Mandopop

Alan chronology
Shēngshēng Zuì Rúlán (2005)	Xin Zhan: Red Cliff (2008)

Shēngshēng Zuì Rúlán (聲聲醉如蘭 Drunk with the Sounds of Alan) is the first studio album from Chinese singer Alan. It features covers of contemporary Chinese language hit songs. The album was re-released a year later, with the title Yùjiàn Ālán (遇見阿蘭; Meeting alan), with a different track order and one extra track.

== Track listing ==
1. "Chìbǎng" (翅膀 "Wings") (originally by Cyndi Wang)
2. "Yùjiàn" (遇見 "Meet") (originally by Stefanie Sun)
3. "Zhīzǐ Huākāi" (梔子花開 "Gardenia in Blossom") (originally by He Jiong)
4. "Gardenia in Blossom" (English version of track above)
5. "Bōli-bēi" (玻璃杯 "A Glass") (originally by Cao Huijuan and Lu Xiaoyun)
6. "Tóng Huà" (童話 "Fairy Tale") (originally by Michael Wong)
7. "Zuì Qīng Fēng" (醉清風 "The Drunk Breeze") (originally by Xian Zi)
8. "Nǐ Dàodǐ Ài Shéi" (你到底愛誰 "Who Do You Really Love?") (originally by Liu Jialiang)
9. "Níng Xià" (寧夏 "Peaceful Summer") (originally by Fish Leong)
10. "Bèi Fēng Chuīguò de Xiàtiān" (被風吹過的夏天 "Summer Breeze") (originally by JJ Lin and Jin Sha)
11. "Zuì Làngmàn de Shì" (最浪漫的事 "The Most Romantic Thing") (originally by Cyndi Chaw)
12. "Yībèizi de Gūdān" (一輩子的孤單 "Loneliness All My Life") (originally by Rene Liu)
13. "Shí Nián" (十年; Ten Years) (originally by Eason Chan)
14. "Rěnbuzhù Yǎnlèi" (忍不住眼淚 "I Can't Bear the Tears") (originally by Hua Shaoyi) (only on Yu Jian Alan)
