= Bittereinder (band) =

South African rap band

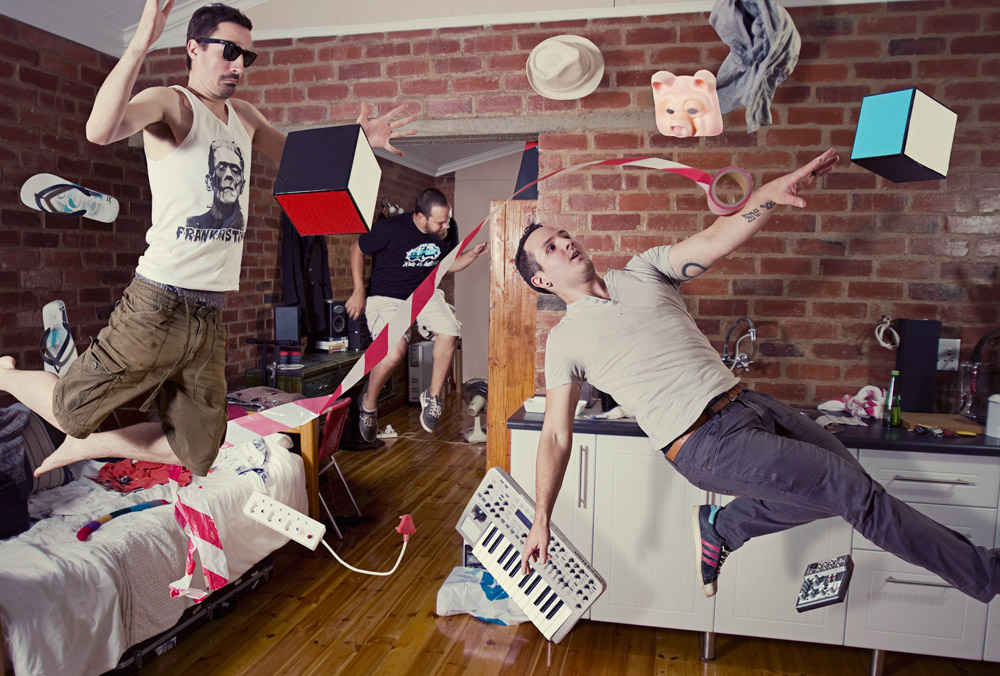
- Bittereinder by Louis Minnaar

Background information
- Origin: Pretoria, South Africa
- Genres: Hip hop; rap; electro; Afrikaans rap
- Years active: 2009–2023
- Labels: Rhythm Records; Electromode; Independent
- Members: Jaco van der Merwe; Peach van Pletzen; Louis Minnaar
- Website: www.bittereinder.com

Bittereinder was a South African rap/electro band from Pretoria who perform in Afrikaans. Jaco van der Merwe, Peach van Pletzen, and Louis Minnaar founded the three-man band in 2009, and have since performed at major South African festivals such as Oppikoppi, across southern Africa, and the Netherlands. They are known for their high-energy performances.

The name Bittereinder originates from the Second Boer War. Towards the end of the war, so-called Boers, Afrikaans-speaking farmers, engaged in guerrilla warfare against the British despite the fact that they had already lost. They fought "to the bitter end", and were therefore called "bitter-enders", or, in Afrikaans, "bittereinders"; more colloquially, the English translation would be "diehard". Van der Merwe says that the band interprets the word more positively: "Today, it means more not giving up."

They have been characterised as more positive than Die Antwoord. Van der Merwe's lyrics are "a little more hopeful", he has said, because he tries to find things to be proud of in the Afrikaans identity, although it is difficult because there is "much to be ashamed of". Typical for Bittereinder's lyrics is the amount of code-switching between Afrikaans and English.

== History ==
All three members of Bittereinder are from Afrikaans-speaking families in Pretoria but went to English-speaking schools. Due to the low status of Afrikaans in post-Apartheid South Africa, as a boy, Van der Merwe was made to feel like an outsider growing up, and was "called 'Dutchman' and 'Boer' daily." The shame he felt as a result led to him rejecting the language and culture when he was growing up.

He began writing rap when he was fifteen years old, initially in English, and only later in Afrikaans, "with a dictionary in [...] hand" as he tried to learn the language after he had reconciled with his background.

From 1998, van der Merwe had written and performed in English under the stage name Ajax. He met Peach van Pletzen in April 2008, when he toured with Pletzen's solo effort, Yesterday's Pupil, in Poland. Louis Minnaar, who was known for his award-winning music videos for Van Coke Kartel, Yesterday's Pupil, and Die Heuwels Fantasties, was originally brought into the group for that purpose, but also became a composer and producer during the writing and production of 'n Ware Verhaal.

In 2009, Jaco van der Merwe approached Peach van Pletzen and Louis Minnaar about his desire to start an Afrikaans rap project, which project would become Bittereinder.

Their first album, 'n Ware Verhaal, was in production for almost two years.

In 2013, they released "Kwaad Naas", a lighthearted song about the tension between English and Afrikaans whites in South Africa.

In 2015, Jaco van der Merwe with Jean-Louise Parker started the music label Wêreld Records.

== Touring, Significant Performances and Media ==
=== Shows ===
Bittereinder have played and headlined festivals in South Africa, The Netherlands, Mozambique and Namibia, including Oppikoppi, Lowlands, KKNK, Aardklop, Innibos, STRAB, Hart van Windhoek, Synergy (JHB & CT), Ramfest (JHB & CT), TUKS Spring Day, Smoking Dragon Festival, Gariep Festival, TUKS Rag, PUK Jool and The Campus Invasion Tour.

=== Collaborations ===
Bittereinder have collaborated on stage with David Kramer, Koos Kombuis, Inge Beckmann, Kongos, Tumi Molekane, Hanu de Jong (The Narrow / Not my dog), Richard Brokensha (ISO), HemelBesem, Carlo Mombelli, Reason, Shane Durrant (Desmond & the Tutus) amongst others.

In 2009, Bittereinder collaborated with rappers Jack Parow and Tumi Molekane (of Tumi & the Volume) on "A Tale of Three Cities", a patriotic song about Cape Town, Johannesburg, and Pretoria.

=== 2012–present ===
Bittereinder toured the Netherlands for a second time in June 2013, this time with Van Coke Kartel and Jack Parow on a tour called "Afrikaans Verower Harte"; this tour included the "Festival Voor Het Afrikaans" at Melkweg, Amsterdam.

In August 2013, van der Merwe was interviewed about the band on CNN's Inside Africa, in an episode about cultural diversity in South Africa.

Bittereinder have also appeared and performed live on e-TV's hip hop show "Shiz Niz", SABC 2's Afrikaans soap opera "7de Laan", 5FM's "live @ 5" and Hamman Time, Kyknet's "Kwêla", Kyknet's "Hoor-Hoor!", Kyknet's "Fiesta", numerous times on MK's live show "Studio 1", featured in a collaboration with a cappella group The Soil on SABC 2's music fusion show "Jam Sandwich", recorded a collaboration with The Plastics & Jon Savage for 5FM's Mashlab in 2013, as well as being awarded the honour of being the Opening Act at the 2012 Pendoring Awards in Cape Town, and performing in the Pendoring Awards show again in 2013.

Bittereinder also performed at the 2013 Tempo Awards. Jaco hosted the 2013 MK Awards in March (with Bouwer Bosch), and Bittereinder opened the award show as well as being the "house band" during the live broadcast of the award ceremony from the South African State Theatre.

In 2016, they remixed Desmond and the Tutus' "Pretoria Girls".

In May 2017, Van Der Merwe announced Bittereinder were working on their fifth album.

Bittereinder's fifth album, titled Volksvreemde Vertalings was released on 9 September 2022 and overall takes a much calmer, more introspective style than their previous albums.

== Band members ==
The band consists of:

- Jaco van der Merwe – lyricist, lead vocals (2009–present)
- Peach van Pletzen – producer, vocalist, mixing engineer (2009–present)
- Louis Minnaar – producer, visual artist, vocalist (2009–present)

== Discography ==
=== Studio albums ===
They have released four albums:

- 'n Ware Verhaal (2010)
- Die Dinkdansmasjien (2012)
- Skerm (2014)
- Dans tot die dood (2015)
- Volksvreemde Vertalings (2022)

=== Singles ===
- Ware Verhaal (2010)
- A Tale of Three Cities (2010)
- Slechte Mensen (2010)
- Solidariteit (2011)
- Die Dinkdansmasjien (2013)
- Kwaad Naas (2013)
- Kulkuns (2014)
- Die Slagting (2014)
- Slegte Mense (LT Remix) (2014)
- Skerm (2015)
- Hartseer Gangster (2015)
- Donderwolk (2017)
- Asemrowers (2018)
- Karongeluk (2019)
- Zero Illusions (2020)
- Hoogste Bome (2022)

== Awards ==
=== Awards Won ===
Date	Award	Awarding Body
2015	Best Alternative Album – Skerm	SAMA
2013	Best South African Band	Rekord
2011	Best Afrikaans Alternative Album – 'n Ware Vertaal	SAMA

=== Award Nominations ===
Date	Award	Awarding Body
2014	Best Alternative Album	SAMA
2015	Duo or Group of the Year	SAMA
2014	Best Music Video	MK Awards
2014	Best Live Act	MK Awards
2014	Album of the Year	MK Awards
2013	Best Alternative Album – Die Dinkdansmasjien	SAMA
2013	Best Live Act	MK Awards
2012	Best Newcomer	MK Awards
2012	Best Group	MK Awards
2012	Best Dance	MK Awards
2011	Beste Alternatiewe Musiekvideo	Tempo Awards
2011	Beste Kopskuifalbum	Tempo Awards
