= It's My Life =

It's My Life may refer to:

== Film and television ==
- It's My Life (film), a 2020 Indian film
- My Life to Live (UK title: It's My Life), a 1962 film directed by Jean-Luc Godard
- It's My Life (British TV programme), a 2003–2008 youth discussion programme
- It's My Life (South Korean TV series), a 2018–2019 drama series

== Literature ==
- It's My Life (manga), a 2014–2018 Japanese manga series
- It's My Life, a 1980 novel by Robert Leeson

== Music ==
=== Albums ===
- It's My Life (album), by Talk Talk, or the title song (see below), 1984
- It's My Life – The Album, by Sash!, or the title song (see below), 1997

=== Songs ===
- "It's My Life" (Amy Diamond song), 2009
- "It's My Life" (The Animals song), 1965
- "It's My Life" (Bon Jovi song), 2000
- "It's My Life" (Cezar song), 2013
- "It's My Life" (Dr. Alban song), 1992
- "It's My Life" (Sash! song), 1996
- "It's My Life" (Talk Talk song), 1984; covered by No Doubt (2003)
- "It's My Life"/"Your Heaven", by Yui, 2011
- "It's My Life", by Alexandra Stan from Rainbows, 2022
- "It's My Life", by Connie Britton from the TV series Nashville, 2013
- "It's My Life", by DJ BoBo, 1997
- "It's My Life", by the Monkees from Justus, 1996
- "It's My Life", by Tages from Studio, 1967
- "It's My Life", by Wendy O. Williams from WOW, 1984

== See also ==
- This Is My Life (disambiguation)
- My Life (disambiguation)
