= World Parkinson Congress =

Parkinson's disease non-profit

The World Parkinson Coalition, often referred to as the WPC, is a non-religious, non-political, and non-profit making organization that connects those who are concerned with the health and welfare of people living with Parkinson's disease (PD) and their caregivers. Founded in 2004 by Dr. Stanley Fahn, the WPC brings the Parkinson's community together, under one roof at its triennial World Parkinson Congresses to allow for cross-pollination of researchers, clinicians, and those living with Parkinson's to educate each other and to generate more robust ideas around the science and care of Parkinson's. The WPC partners with more than 100 Organizational Partners, other nonprofit organizations, around the world.

There is no other international meeting focused just on Parkinson's disease that also invites people with Parkinson's to have a seat at the table. This meeting is open to all people researchers, treating, or living with PD.

The triennial World Parkinson Congress provides a unique forum for partnership between international patient and neurological organizations, government bodies, and the pharmaceutical industry.

HISTORY The 1st World Parkinson Congress (WPC 2006) was held February 22–26, 2006, in Washington, DC, US. WPC 2006 attracted more than 3,150 delegates from nearly 60 countries; the 2nd World Parkinson Congress (WPC 2010) was held September 2010 in Glasgow, United Kingdom, with more than 3,000; the 3rd World Parkinson Congress (WPC 2013) was held in October 2013 in Montreal, Canada, with more than 3,300 delegates; and the 4th World Parkinson Congress (WPC 2016) was held in Portland, Oregon with over 4,550 delegates from 65 countries. The 5th World Parkinson Congress (WPC 2019) was held in Kyoto, Japan, in June 2019 and attracted 2,777 delegates from 60 countries to hear 180 speakers over four days. The 6th World Parkinson Congress (WPC 2023) was held in Barcelona, Spain, in July 2023 and attracted over 2,600people from nearly 70 countries to hear 205 speaker over four days. The 7th World Parkinson Congress (WPC 2026) will take place in Phoenix, Arizona in May 2026 and is expected to attract 4,000 delegates.

WPC BLOG The WPC Blog is an inclusive site with posts from a wide range of experts across the globe who research, treat, and live with Parkinson's disease. As a hub for all things Parkinson's, this blog has international readership for the topic covering everything from basic science, clinical science, comprehensive care, and advocacy.
