= Benjamin Dube =

- Born: January 23, 1962 (age 64); Johannesburg, South Africa
- Occupations: Gospel recording artist & Pastor
- Years active: 1980 – current
- Children: 4 sons
- Musical career
- Genres: Gospel, Contemporary
- Instruments: Vocals, guitar, piano
- Label: Dube Connection Enterprise

Benjamin Dube (born 1962) is a South African gospel recording artist who rose to fame in the early 1980s. Over the years he has released several albums which have reached gold and platinum status in the South African music rankings. Dube is also a lead pastor and General Overseer of High Praise Centre Church in South Africa.

== Early years ==
Coming from a religious family, Dube's music interest was sparked at an early age. He started singing gospel music together with his family as a seven-year-old. By the age of twelve, Benjamin started singing alongside his older siblings in the church, and they became known as the Dube Family singers. But unfortunately, things would forever change for the Dube's family when their patriarch and father was gruesomely murdered in 1976. The family decided to sing and share stories of their father's death.

== Discography ==
- Celebration (1994)
- I feel like going on (2000)
- High Praise Explosion (2002)
- for every mountain...thank you (2004)
- You Bless Me Still (2005)
- In His Presence (2007)
- Worship in His Presence (2010)
- Healing in His Presence (2012)
- Renewal in His Presence (2014)
- Sanctified in His Presence (2015)
- Victorious in His Presence (2017)
- Glory in His Presence (2019)
- Legendary in His Presence (2023)
- Legendary in His Presence 2 (2024)
- Looking back
