= Some Day Soon =

Studio album by Kristian Leontiou
- Released: 31 May 2004
- Genres: Pop, pop rock, adult contemporary
- Length: 49:30
- Label: Polydor
- Producers: Ash Howes, Pete Wilkinson, Martin Harrington, Mark Stevens, Alan Ross

Singles from Some Day Soon
- 1. "Story of My Life" Released: 24 May 2004; 2. "Shining" Released: 16 August 2004; 3. "Some Say" Released: 22 November 2004; 4. "Fast Car" Released: 4 April 2005

Some Day Soon is the debut and only solo album by singer-songwriter Kristian Leontiou. He subsequently formed a band, One Eskimo. The album was originally released on 31 May 2004 and then re-released on 4 April 2005 with new artwork and bonus track "Fast Car" - a single and cover version of Tracy Chapman's song, that Leontiou had previously played at different venues and had proved to be a favourite amongst fans.

== Reception ==
Caroline Sullivan of The Guardian gave the album three stars out of five, saying that a "soulful, lover-man tenor, which was made for sweaty R&B action" had been "squandered on middle-of-the-road ballads", but concluding that "Leontiou's saving grace is a depressive edge that roughs up even the blandest tracks".

== Track listing ==
1. "Story of My Life" (Kristian Leontiou, Sarah Erasmus, Pete Wilkinson) – 3:49
2. "Shining" (Leontiou, Erasmus, Wilkinson) – 4:01
3. "The Years Move On" (Leontiou, Erasmus, Wilkinson) – 3:54
4. "Fast Car"^{1} (Tracy Chapman) – 3:18
5. "Love Is All I Need" (Leontiou, Erasmus, Wilkinson) – 3:41
6. "It's OK" (Wilkinson) – 4:02
7. "The Crying" (Leontiou, Erasmus, Wilkinson) – 3:26
8. "Some Say" (Leontiou, Erasmus, Wilkinson) – 3:35
9. "Caught In The Moment" (Leontiou, Erasmus, Wilkinson) – 3:50
10. "Hanging" (Leontiou, Matty Benbrook, Pauline Taylor) – 3:51
11. "Fall And I Will Catch You" (Leontiou, Erasmus, Wilkinson) – 4:02
12. "Sometimes I Wonder" (Acoustic Version)^{2} (Leontiou, Mark Stevens, Alan Ross) – 3:28
13. "Remember The Day"^{3} (Leontiou) – 1:00

^{1} Added on album re-release
^{2} UK bonus track
^{3} Snippet, hidden track

== Singles ==
"Story of My Life"

- Released: 24 May 2004
- Chart positions: #9(UK), #70(DE)
- B-side: "Homecoming"

"Shining"

- Released: 16 August 2004
- Chart positions: #13(UK)
- B-side: "Here I Am"

"Some Say"

- Released: 22 November 2004
- Chart positions: #54(UK)
- B-side: "Hi-lo & In Between"

Murder victim Meredith Kercher made a cameo appearance in the music video. Her performance came three years before she was found dead in Italy.

"Fast Car" (Download only)

- Released: 4 April 2005
- Chart positions: #88 (UK - 2011)
- B-side: "About Last Night"

== Release history ==
Release	Date
Original release	31 May 2004
Re-release	4 April 2005
