= Loyiso =

Given name

Loyiso is a given name. Notable people with the name include:

- Loyiso Bala, one of The Bala Brothers
- Loyiso Gijana (born 1999), South African musician known as Lloyiso
- Loyiso Gola (born 1983), South African comedian
- Loyiso Macdonald (born 1986), South African actor
- Loyiso Magqashela, South African politician
- Loyiso Mdashe (born 1989), South African cricketer
- Loyiso Mpumlwana (died 2020), South African politician and advocate
- Loyiso Nongxa, South African mathematician
