= Adam Tas (singer) =

South African singer and songwriter

- Born: August 25, 1981 (age 44); Pretoria, South Africa
- Genres: Folk
- Occupations: Singer; songwriter
- Years active: 2003–present
- Website: www.adamtas.co.za

Adam Tas (born August 25, 1981, in Pretoria, South Africa) is a South African singer and songwriter in Afrikaans.

He studied at Garsfontein school and later studied journalism at UNISA and also became a qualified game ranger. His musical career began with performances at many local pubs in Hatfield and across South Africa. His album My Memories In 'n Menthol composed of songs written by himself in collaboration with Kobus Koekoes, found great success. He was later signed to EMI in 2006. In 2007 performed at 41 venues in a 24 hours span earning a mention in Guinness Book of Records. He also hosted the South African television programme Wild en Wragtag and appeared in the film Die spook van Uniondale. He was eventually signed to Select Music. In 2016, he released a tribute album 'n Tas vol Cash dedicated to Johnny Cash.

Since 2003, he has released a number of studio albums and is well-known for sentimental songs about farm life in South Africa.

== Discography ==
- 2003: Nag van die Nerf [Wildbeest]
- 2004: My Memories In 'n Menthol [Exaltation/Bowline]
- 2006: Springbok Radio [EMI]
- 2008: Ben Bicycle [Ramkat]
- 2010: Storm van Liefde [Select]
- 2012: Man van Stof
- 2014: Want jy is boer
- 2016: 'n Tas vol Cash
