= BlackByrd =

South African musical group

- Origin: Cape Town, South Africa
- Genres: pop music, adult contemporary, country music
- Years active: 2012–2022, 2024-present
- Label: EMI
- Members: Tarryn Lamb; Tasche Burger; Tasha
- Past members: Samantha Heldsinger; Tamsyn Maker; Axene Chaberski
- Website: blackbyrd.co.za

BlackByrd is a South African pop trio from Cape Town. Formed in 2012, the group currently consists of Tarryn Lamb, Axene Chaberski and Tamsyn Maker.

BlackByrd’s sound is firmly rooted in pop-country with ballads about love and heartbreak. The band formed after Tarryn Lamb posted an advert on Gumtree in 2012, looking for other musicians to start an all-girl group. Within a couple of months, they were signed by EMI and released their debut album, Strong. BlackByrd disbanded prior to Maker dying in 2022.

On 14 May 2024, Tarryn posted on instagram that Blackbyrd will have 2 new member with Tarryn as the third. On 16 May it was revealed that the first member to be introduced will be Tasha and on 20 May, Tasche Burger was revealed to be the final member. On 30 May, Blackbyrd released their first single with the new lineup, called Didn't I.

BlackByrd have released two studio albums and have performed as opening acts for international artist, such as Mike + The Mechanics, Patrizio Buanne and Jamiroquai. They have won two South African Music Awards for their albums, including Best Duo or Group Award.
