= This Is the Life (Lulu Dikana album) =

Studio album by Lulu Dikana
- Released: 2011
- Recorded: 2009–2011
- Genre: Neo soul, afrosoul, gospel
- Label: TMP
- Producer: Wilson Joel, and others

Lulu Dikana chronology
My Diary, My Thoughts (2008)	This Is the Life (2011)	I Came to Love (2014)

This Is the Life is the second studio album by South African singer and vocalist Lulu Dikana. The album is the follow-up to her debut, My Diary, My Thoughts.

== Reception ==
The album was positively received among local music critics with Channel O describing the album as "a long spiritual conversation about LOVE and one that celebrates the gift of life". The album was nominated in three categories at the 12th Metro FM Music Awards and "Best R&B/Soul/Reggae Album" category at the 19th South African Music Awards.

== Track listing ==
1. "Introduction"
2. "He Loves Me" produced by Wilson Joel
3. "Saviour" produced by Wilson Joel
4. "Keep Moving" produced by Wilson Joel
5. "Number 1" produced by Wilson Joel
6. "No Other Life" produced by Wilson Joel
7. "This is the Life" produced by Wilson Joel
8. "Voice of Love" produced by Wilson Joel
9. "Walking Miracle" produced by Wilson Joel
10. "The Season" produced by Wilson Joel
11. "Love it was You" produced by Wilson Joel
12. "You’ve been Good" produced by Wilson Joel featuring ikiri Lawrence
13. "Bring the Children"

== Release history ==
List of release dates, showing region, formats, label, editions and reference
Region	Date	Format(s)	Label	Edition(s)
South Africa	2011	CD; digital download; Vinyl	TM Performing Arts Management	Standard

== Accolades ==
Year	Award ceremony	Prize	Result	Ref
2013	12th Metro FM Music Awards	Best Female Album	Nominated	
2013	12th Metro FM Music Awards	Best Produced Album	Nominated	
2013	12th Metro FM Music Awards	Best Contemporary Jazz Album	Nominated	
2013	19th South African Music Awards	Best R&B/Soul/Reggae Album	Nominated	
