= David H. Reynolds =

Dave Reynolds is the co-owner of the 6th largest mobile home parks business in the United States. He also co-owns and runs Mobile Home University.

== Career ==
Reynolds’ parents owned a mobile home court in Colorado. He graduated from Mesa State College with an accounting degree, then worked for his parents and lived in the mobile home court. After discovering that he could make more money buying mobile home parks than working as a CPA, he bought his first one in 1993 at the age of 24. He met business partner, Frank Rolfe, in 2006 at a Mobile Home University conference where they were both guest speakers. They subsequently purchased Mobile Home University from the original two founders. Along with Rolfe, Reynolds is the sixth-largest owner of mobile home parks in the United States, owning over 160. The company operates out of Cedaredge, Colorado as Mobile Home Parks and RV Horizons. RV Horizons has been sued by residents of an Austin, Texas mobile park for raising rents and issuing eviction notices. The New York Times reports that the business typically spends several hundred thousand dollars fixing up the acquired parks. Reynolds also owns and runs a large website of mobile home park listings that receives over one million visitors a year.

== Mobile Home University ==
Reynolds co-owns Mobile Home University, a three-day intensive course on the mobile home business taught once a month in locations around the United States. Rolfe and Reynolds both consider as the course to be a hobby. While Rolfe and Reynolds originally both taught Mobile Home University, Rolfe is now the primary instructor. The course costs approximately $2,000 and is a combination of classroom lecture and onsite tour visits to local mobile home communities. During the course, attendees are taught how to make a profit by purchasing mobile home parks. One concept taught during the course is how to increase rent rates as much as 10% per year, even if it is more than market rate, a practice that has received criticism. An estimated 25-30% of Mobile Home University participants purchase mobile home parks.
