= Mi Vida =

Mi Vida may refer to:

- Mi Vida (José José album), 1982
- Mi Vida: Grandes Éxitos, a 1998 album by Julio Iglesias
- "Mi Vida", 2000 song by Manu Chao from Próxima Estación: Esperanza
- Mi Vida (film), a 2019 Dutch film
- Mi Vida (Kendji Girac album), 2020
