= In My Lifetime =

In My Lifetime may refer to:

- "In My Lifetime" (song), a 1995 single by Jay-Z
- In My Lifetime, Vol. 1, a 1997 album by Jay-Z
- In My Lifetime, a 1996 compilation album by Neil Diamond
