= Alan Dawa Dolma =

Tibetan singer (born 1987)

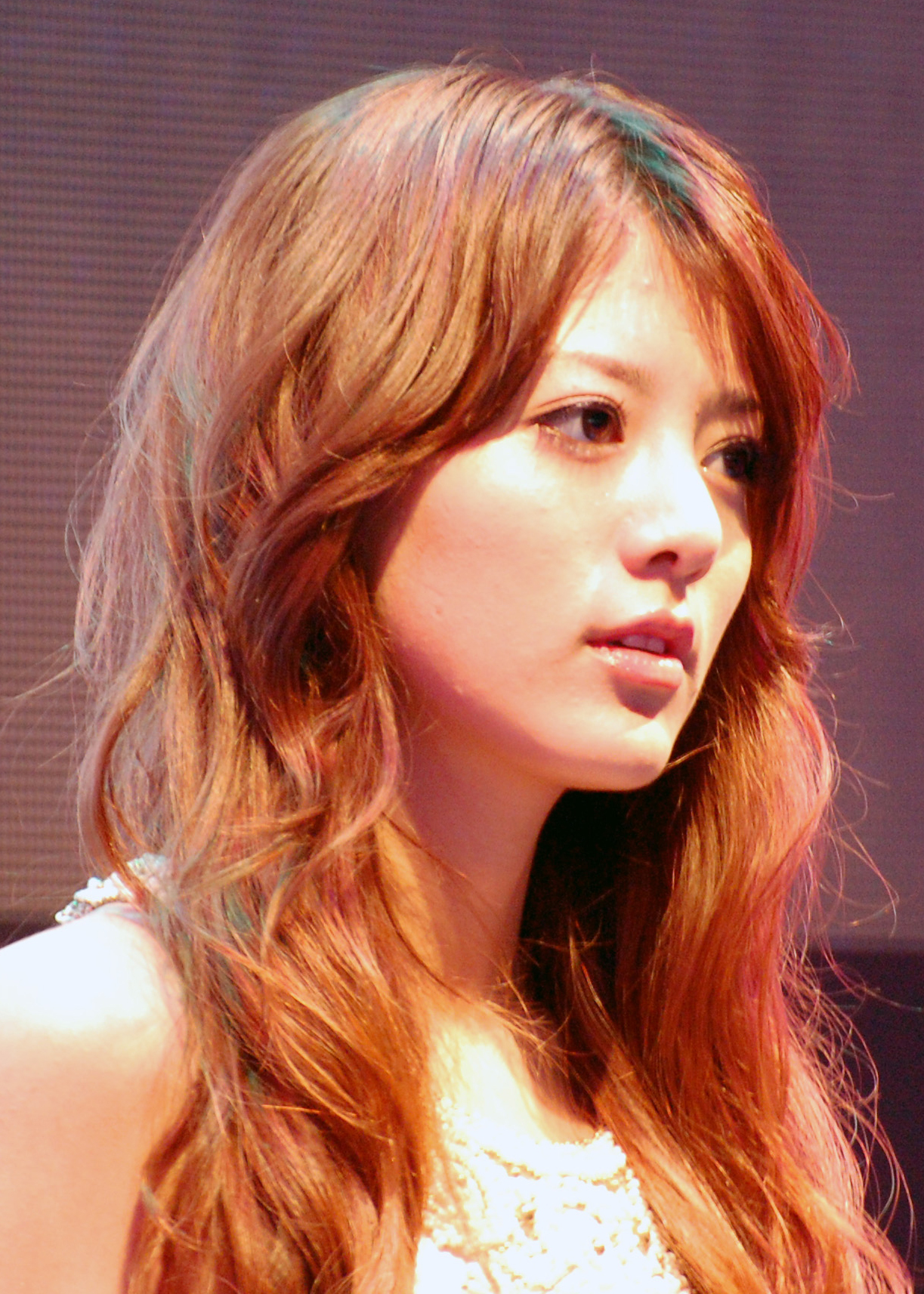
- Alan at the 2008 Tokyo Game Show
- Born: 25 July 1987 (age 39); Kangding, Garzê, Sichuan, China
- Occupation: Singer
- Years active: 2005–present
- Musical career
- Origin: Kham
- Genres: Pop, Mandopop, J-pop, Tibet folk
- Instruments: Erhu, piano, vocals
- Labels: Avex Trax, YH Entertainment

Tibetan name
- Tibetan: ཨ་ལན་ཟླ་བ་སྒྲོལ་མ་
Transcriptions
- Tibetan Pinyin: Alan Dawazhouma

Chinese name
- Simplified Chinese: 阿兰·达瓦卓玛
- Traditional Chinese: 阿蘭·達瓦卓瑪
Transcriptions
Standard Mandarin
- Hanyu Pinyin: Ālán Dáwǎzhuómǎ

Japanese name
- Kanji: 阿蘭
- Kana: アラン
- Website: alan-web.jp

Alan Dawa Dolma (Note: Tibetan: ཨ་ལན་ཟླ་བ་སྒྲོལ་མ་, ZWPY: Alan Dawazhouma; Chinese: 阿兰·达瓦卓玛; pinyin: Ālán Dáwǎzhuómǎ) (born 25 July 1987), known mononymously as Alan, is a Chinese singer of Tibetan ethnicity. She is a graduate of the People's Liberation Army (PLA) Academy of Art in Beijing, majoring in vocal music and erhu, which she has played since childhood. Alan is known for a distinctive technique called the "Tibetan wail".

During her time in college, Alan released an album titled Shengsheng Zui Rulan (2005). In early 2006, she auditioned for the Japanese label Avex Trax. In late 2007, Alan moved to Tokyo and made her singles debut with "Ashita e no Sanka". She recorded theme songs to the film Red Cliff (2008), bringing her wider exposure. In 2009, her ninth single "Kuon no Kawa" and theme song to Part II of Red Cliff reached number three on the Oricon weekly charts, the highest placement by a singer from China. She has since been active in Japan and China.

== Biography ==
=== 1987–2002: Early life ===
Alan was born on 25 July 1987, in Kangding, Sichuan province, to Atu, a local government official, and Lantai, a singer. She is a native speaker of Khams Tibetan. Her extended family includes many relatives; her father had ten siblings and her mother had eight.

As Tibetan culture traditionally makes no use of family names, she was born as simply Dawa Dolma, bestowed upon her by a Buddhist monk and meaning "heavenly maiden of the moon" in Tibetan. She later adopted a family name for practical reasons, with "A-Lan" born from a portmanteau of her parents' given names, Atu and Lantai.

Alan was made to play the erhu at an early age as punishment for her tomboy behavior and to instill good behavior. She spent little time with her parents in Kangding and often lived with her grandparents instead. She and her mother later moved to the provincial capital, Chengdu, where her aunt lived. Alan completed her secondary education there under the Sichuan Conservatory of Music.

=== 2003–2006: Career beginnings ===
In 2003, she was accepted to the People's Liberation Army (PLA) Academy of Art in Beijing and double-majored in vocal music and erhu. She described the environment there as strict, which allayed her parents' concerns however. Playing the erhu, she performed traditional Chinese music with a group of girls at the 2006 gala performance near Cairo, which celebrated the 50th anniversary of the establishment of Chinese–Egyptian diplomatic ties.

During this time, Alan performed as a singer throughout China and discovered pop music from acts such as Faye Wong, Jacky Cheung and Andy Lau. In 2005 she released a Chinese album, Shengsheng Zui Rulan.

In October 2006, selected to represent mainland China together with Vision Wei (with whom she later collaborated for the single "Jiayou! Ni You Me!"), Alan won second place at the 9th Asia New Singer Competition.

=== 2007–2010: Voice of Earth, My Life and Japan Premium Best and More ===
In April 2006, Alan distinguished herself from roughly 40,000 hopefuls when Avex Trax held auditions throughout Chinese cities that year. After graduating with excellence a year later, she became Avex's first signed artist from China and moved to Tokyo, Japan in September 2007. In November, her first Japanese single "Ashita e no Sanka" was released. She received three months of formal training in the Japanese language but became fluent within two years by practicing on her own. Avex hoped that she could help the label scale both Japanese and Chinese markets.

In May 2008, Alan released Shiawase no Kane/Ai Jiushi Shou and all profits from the songs were donated to the Red Cross to help the victims of the Sichuan earthquake in her home province. A later Japanese single titled Gunjō no Tani was also dedicated to the people of Sichuan.

In June 2008, Alan sang the theme song "Natsukashii Mirai (Longing Future)" for NHK's Save the Future special TV programs which raised awareness of the environment nationwide. Beginning with this song, which was themed on earth, Alan's next five Japanese singles each dealt with a traditional Buddhist element from the Japanese Godai or Tibetan Bön.

Chosen to sing the theme songs (Xin Zhan: Red Cliff and Chibi: Da Jiangdong Qu) of the two-episode Chinese blockbuster Red Cliff, Alan performed at the Cannes Film Festival in May 2008. The Japanese versions, "Red Cliff (Shin-Sen)" and "Kuon no Kawa", were recorded for the films' showings in Japan.

In April 2009 Alan's ninth single "Kuon no Kawa" [River of Eternity] reached No. 3, the highest chart placement ever for a Chinese artist in Japan.

Alan held her first Japan tour in January 2010, taking in Tokyo, Nagoya and Osaka.

On 3 February 2010, Alan released a double A-side single, "Diamond/Over the Clouds". "Diamond" was used as the second closing to the anime Inuyasha: The Final Act. While "Over the Clouds" was used as the theme song for the PSP video game, God Eater.

On 23 July 2010 Alan performed with a symphonic orchestra at Shibuya Orchard Hall, performing 23 songs in multiple languages. She also began using Twitter to communicate directly with fans.

=== 2011–2013: Hiatus in Japan, return to China, and Love Song ===
In August 2011 alan announced that she will be focusing on her activities in China. She held a live on 31 August 2011 in Japan. In October was announced that alan's Chinese label, Avex China, dissolved and she was transferred to Yuehua Music.

Her first single under the new label called "Wǒ huíláile (I'm back)" was released as digital single in China, Taiwan and Hong Kong and was composed by JJ Lin.

Alan starred as the female lead, the "Crystal Goddess", in the 21 September "Bird Nest- Attraction" musical.

In June 2012, Alan released her first Chinese album under Yuehua Music, Love Song, which includes 10 new songs produced by some famous C-pop producer like Anson Hu and Yuan Wei Jen, and a Japanese version of the album's title song.

In 2013, Alan auditioned for the Chinese version of popular TV Show The X-Factor Zhongguo Zui Qiang Yin. When asked of the reason of joining a singing competition show, Alan expressed her disapproval of being known as the singer of theme songs to films and television serials such as Red Cliff, Inuyasha and Bu Bu Jing Xin, and decided to have a "new start" to her singing career. Alan past the auditions, however she was eliminated before reaching the final twelve due to her judge Lo Ta-yu's critiquing on Alan's inability to reach high notes and that she wasn't suitable for the competition. Her elimination was deemed controversial due to additional footage displaying Alan's ability to reach her high notes.

Alan has also provided her voice to sing the theme song of Chinese Martial Arts MMORPG Wen Jian. The song is named The Sword Between Heaven and Earth (天地問劍).

=== 2014–present ===
On 24 May 2014 Alan held her first concert in Japan since 2011.

July 2014 marked the release of her fourth Chinese studio album Mo Lan, which includes five previously released digital singles: "Huí Wàng", "Sùmìng Héngzhe Xiě", "Ài Wèi Zǒu Yuǎn", "Tiān Dì Wèn Jiàn" and "Home".

In August 2014, she officially announced a year-end concert entitled Alan symphony that would take place on 20 December that year in Tokyo.

On 20 December 2014, Alan held two "Alan Symphony 2014" concerts in Nippon-Seinenkan (日本青年館), Tokyo, Japan. One concert started at 15:00 and the other at 19:00.

In 2021, she participated in music-related TV shows such as Sisters Who Make Waves (season 2). During a recording for the third season of 《流淌的歌声》, she expressed that women should be more confident of themselves and not regard age as a barrier.

== Artistry ==
"Ashita e no Sanka" (2007)
Alan employing the "Tibetan wail" singing technique on her debut Japanese single, "Ashita e no Sanka".

One distinctive style that Alan uses is the "Tibetan wail", a soaring sound at very high pitches. She acquired it instinctively while growing up in Sichuan Bijindani, where singing and dancing are daily activities, and compared it to Okinawan and Mongolian folk music. As a Tibetan Buddhist, she aims to sing about "love and peace".

== Discography ==
=== Japanese discography ===
Studio albums

- 2009: Voice of Earth
- 2009: My Life

Compilation albums

- 2011: Japan Premium Best & More
- 2022: The Best of alan 2007-2022 (Digital)

=== Chinese discography ===
Studio albums

- 2005: Shengsheng Zui Rulan (声声醉如兰)
- 2009: Xin De Dongfang (心的東方)
- 2012: Love Song
- 2014: Mo Lan (驀蘭)
- 2017: Shi Nian (十念)

EPs

- 2008: Xin Zhan: Red Cliff (心・战)
- 2010: Lan Se: Love Moon Light (蘭色)
- 2021: I Want To Love You So Much (我想好好愛你)

== Filmography ==
- 《我的双面女友》(2012)
- 《粉红女郎·爱人快跑》(2013)
- The Rise of a Tomboy (2016)
- 《热血江湖之梦幻奇缘》(2017)
