= Xin Zhan: Red Cliff =

心・战 ~RED CLIFF~ Xin·Zhan ~RED CLIFF~ Heart, War ~RED CLIFF~

EP by alan
- Released: June 20, 2008
- Genre: Mandopop
- Length: 21:15
- Label: Avex Trax
- Producer: Kikuchi Kazuhito, Francis Lee, Lin Mingyang

Alan chronology
Sheng Sheng Zui Ru Lan (2005)	心・战 ~RED CLIFF~; Xin·Zhan ~RED CLIFF~; Heart, War ~RED CLIFF~ (2008)	Xin De Dong Fang (2009)

Xin·Zhan ~RED CLIFF~ is the first Mandarin-language EP released by alan in Mainland China.

Xin・Zhan RED CLIFF Chi Bi Dian Ying Yuan Sheng Da Die is an extended version of the title track, used as the theme song for the 2008 Chinese film Red Cliff (Part I). It was also released with the film's original soundtrack album in Taiwan and Hong Kong as the end roll version, which is slightly longer. The Japanese version of this song, titled Red Cliff: Shin-Sen was released later that year in Japan.

The song was nominated for Best Original Song in the 28th Hong Kong Film Awards but lost to Jane Zhang's Painted Heart.

The other songs in the maxi-single are Mandarin-language versions of songs from alan's Japanese singles, sharing the same music. "San Seng Shi San Sheng Lu" is the Chinese version of "Sakura Modern" from Ashita e no Sanka, and "Yi Ge" and "Mi Shi De Zhu Fu" are Chinese versions of "Hitotsu" and "Tokyo Mimei" respectively, both from Hitotsu.

== Track listing ==
=== CD ===
1. Xin·Zhan ~RED CLIFF~ (心・战 ~RED CLIFF~; Heart, War ~RED CLIFF~) (Lyrics: Francis Lee, Music: Iwashiro Taro, Arrangement: Nakano Yuuta)
2. Yi ge (一个; One) (Lyrics: Lin Ming Yang, Music: Kikuchi Kazuhito, Arrangement: Nakano Yuuta)
3. San Sheng Shi San Sheng Lu (三生石三生路; Stones of 3 Lifetimes, Roads of 3 Lifetimes) (Lyrics: Chen Lizhi, Music: Kikuchi Kazuhito, Arrangement: tasuku)
4. Mi Shi De Zhu Fu (迷失的祝福; Lost Blessings) (Lyrics: Cui Shu, Music: Kikuchi Kazuhito, Arrangement: Kyoda Seiichi)
