= Dave Reynolds (musician) =

- Born: David George Reynolds; 12 February 1972 (age 54); Windhoek, Namibia
- Occupations: Musician, composer, producer
- Instruments: Steelpan, acoustic guitar
- Labels: Caveman Music

David George Reynolds (born 12 February 1972) is a South African composer and multi-instrumentalist whose tour de force centers on the steelpans.

== Early years ==
Reynolds' love for music was triggered at an early age. He graduated from Rhodes University cum laude in 1993 and moved to Johannesburg where after winning a SAMRO Composer’s Award he began performing and recording alongside Tananas bass player Gito Baloi.

Over the years Reynolds has toured the world and worked in a number of projects with many musicians, a few of them includes Hugh Masekela, Sipho Gumede, Jeff Maluleke, Paul Hanmer and Pops Mohamed, Concord Nkabinde, Andy Narell.
