= Voice of Earth =

- CD cover

Studio album by alan
- Released: March 4, 2009
- Recorded: 2007–2009
- Genre: Alternative rock, pop
- Length: 70:57
- Label: Avex Trax
- Producer: Masato Matsuura (Executive producer), Kazuhito Kikuchi

Alan chronology
Voice of Earth (2009)	My Life (2009)

Alternative cover
- CD+DVD Cover

Singles from Voice of Earth
- 1. "Ashita e no Sanka" Released: November 21, 2007; 2. "Hitotsu" Released: March 5, 2008; 3. "Natsukashii Mirai: Longing Future" Released: July 2, 2008; 4. "Sora Uta" Released: August 13, 2008; 5. "Kaze no Tegami" Released: September 10, 2008; 6. "Red Cliff: Shin-Sen" Released: October 15, 2008; 7. "Megumi no Ame" Released: November 12, 2008; 8. "Gunjō no Tani" Released: February 4, 2009

Voice of Earth is Chinese singer Alan's debut Japanese-language album released by Avex Trax. The album contains the eight singles alan has released from 2007 to 2009. The album was released on March 4, 2009 in Japan.

== Promotion ==
"Natsukashii Mirai (Longing Future)" was used as the theme song for NHK special, Save the Future, for World Environment Day. Her sixth single "Red Cliff: Shin-Sen" was used to as the theme song for the movie Red Cliff. An alternate version of the song was used to promote the Japanese re-release of the PlayStation 2 game Dynasty Warriors 6. The song "Liberty", is being used as the theme song for Japanese drama, Hikon Dōmei (非婚同盟, lit. Non-Marriage Alliance), which aired on Tokai TV. The song "Tsuki ga Watashi" was used in the commercials for the pachinko chain Minho Group. "Gunjō no Tani" is being used as the ending theme song for Japanese information program, Miyaneya (情報ライブ ミヤネ屋, lit. Live Miyaneya Store Information), which airs on Yomiuri TV.

If the customer ordered Voice of Earth via Tower Records, they would have received a special separate CD that contained a new version of Red Cliff: Shin Sen. This was titled as "Red Cliff: Shin Sen (Modern Rock Version)".

== Track list ==
CD
No.	Title	Lyrics	Music	Arrangement	Length
1.	"Tennyo: interlude (天女 ~interlude~, Celestial Maiden: interlude) (Note: Sung in Tibetan.)"		Kazuhito Kikuchi & Tatsugoo	Kazuhito Kikuchi & Tatsugoo	3:10
2.	"Ashita e no Sanka"	Shinji Nojima	Kazuhito Kikuchi	Yūta Nakano	5:04
3.	"Sora Uta"	Yūho Iwasato	Kazuhito Kikuchi	Yūta Nakano	4:19
4.	"Natsukashii Mirai: Longing Future"	Taeko Onuki	Kazuhito Kikuchi	Yūta Nakano	5:41
5.	"Hitotsu"	Yumi Yoshimoto	Kazuhito Kikuchi	Yūta Nakano	5:07
6.	"Kaze no Tegami"	Yūho Iwasato	Kazuhito Kikuchi	Yūta Nakano	5:00
7.	"Brave"	Yumi Kawanabe	Kazuhito Kikuchi	h-wonder	4:27
8.	"Yume no Garden (夢のガーデン, Dream Garden)"	alan, Yumi Kawanabe	Kazuhito Kikuchi	ats-	5:41
9.	"Gunjō no Tani"	Cocco	Cocco	tasuku	5:05
10.	"My Friend"	kenko-p	Kazuhito Kikuchi	tasuku	4:24
11.	"Liberty"	Yūho Iwasato	Kazuhito Kikuchi	SHiNTA	4:49
12.	"Tsuki ga Watashi (月がわたし, I Am the Moon)"	Kazuhito Kikuchi	Kazuhito Kikuchi	ats-	4:35
13.	"Red Cliff: Shin-Sen"	Goro Matsui	Taro Iwashiro	Yūta Nakano	5:57
14.	"Megumi no Ame"	Toko Furūchi	Kazuhito Kikuchi	Yūta Nakano	5:13
15.	"Together (Note: Bonus track found only on first press.)"	Miki Matsui	Alan Dawa Dolma	Yūta Nakano	4:27
Total length:					70:57

Tower Records Exclusive Bonus CD
No.	Title	Lyrics	Length
1.	"Red Cliff: Shin-Sen (Modern Rock Version)"	Goro Matsui	5:23
Total length:			5:23

DVD
No.	Title	Length
1.	"Intro"
2.	"Ashita e no Sanka"
3.	"Hitotsu"
4.	"Natsukashii Mirai: Longing Future"
5.	"Sora Uta"
6.	"Kaze no Tegami"
7.	"Red Cliff: Shin-Sen"
8.	"Megumi no Ame"
9.	"Gunjō no Tani"
10.	"Choir (Natsukashii Mirai: Longing Future)"
11.	"Together"
12.	"Outro Gunjō no Tani Making Video"

== Charts ==
=== Japan ===
Chart	Peak position	Sales total
Oricon Daily Chart	10	
Oricon Weekly Chart	15	23,568

=== Taiwan ===
Chart	Peak Position	Peak Sale Percentage
G-Music Jpop/Kpop Chart	5	3.91%
Five Music Jpop/Kpop Chart	2	7.6%

== Release history ==
Date	Country
March 4, 2009	Japan
March 13, 2009	Taiwan

== Staff and personnel ==
- Sound Produced By: Kazuhito Kikuchi
- A&R chief: Kentaro Furusawa (Avex Trax)
- A&R: Maiko Shino (Avex Trax)
- Sound director: Yoshihisa Tokuda (Avex Entertainment Inc.)
- Mixed by: Koji Morimoto (Prime Sound Studio Form)
- Mastered by: Tom Cayne at Sterling Sound, NYC
- Visual director: Atsushi Sawamaru (Avex Trax)
- Art director: Shinichi Hana
- Designer: Tomokazu Suzuki (Momya)
- Photographer: Lesley Kee (Supersonic)
- Hair & Makeup: Mayumi Watanabe (Gon.)
- Styling: Saoli Iguchi
- Creative coordinator: Kanako Shino (Avex Marketing Inc.)
- Artist promotion: All Promotion Dept. Staff (Avex Marketing Inc.)
- Tie-Up coordinator: All Tie-Up Dept. Staff (Avex Marketing Inc.)
- Area promotion: All Area Branch Staff (Sapporo, Tokyo, Nagoya, Osaka, Fukuoka)
- Sales promotion: Takeshi Nemoto, Atsushi Nishimoto, Tadayuki Minoda, Jun Yogi, Tomoko Nagaoka & All AMI Staff (Avex Marketing Inc.)
- Web designer & coordinator: Ayumi Kobayashi (Avex Marketing Inc.)
- Web promotion: Naoya Munemura (Avex Marketing Inc.)
- A&R desk: Yuka Nakanishi (Avex Trax)
- Live coordinator: Jun Ishikawa (Avex Live Creation)
- China A&R: Kunio Nakayama (Avex China Co. Ltd)
- Artist manager: Chen Tao, Zhang Guanyu (Avex Marketing Inc.)
- Artist management supervisor: Yoshihiro Seki, Noriyuki Morizane (Avex Marketing Inc.)
- Planner: Jun Harada (Avex Entertainment Inc./Avex Marketing Inc.)
- General director: Hiroshi "funaty" Ishimori (Avex Entertainment Inc.)
- Supervisor: Hidenori Handa
- Executive supervisor: Akihiro Terada (Avex Asia Holding Inc.)
- General producers: Ryuhei Chiba, Takashi Akira (Avex Entertainment Inc.)
- Executive producer: Masato Matsuura (Avex Group)
