= Prime Circle =

South African rock band

- Origin: Johannesburg, South Africa
- Genres: Alternative rock; hard rock; pop rock; post-grunge
- Years active: 2000–present
- Labels: David Gresham Records; EMI; Universal; Electro Mode; Virgin
- Members: Marco Gomes; Dale Schnettler; Dirk Bisschoff; Neil Breytenbach; Gavin Edwards
- Past members: Ross Learmonth; Gerhard Venter
- Website: www.primecircleband.com

Prime Circle are a South African rock band, based in Johannesburg. The band has released 8 studio albums and achieved either gold or platinum status in South Africa. The band has expanded its audience to England and Europe where they are represented by a German agent and have signed an international recording deal, performing at festivals and their own shows in Germany.

== Early years ==
Prime Circle was formed in the mining town of Witbank, Mpumalanga in December 2000. The band signed with independent local label, David Gresham Records in 2002, whose first two albums are considered to have defined the band's signature sound and style. In 2008, Prime Circle signed to EMI Music South Africa. From 2014 Prime Circle release Let The Night in, If you Don't you Never Will and Live World through with Electro Mode.

== Career landmarks ==
=== 2016 ===
- The single, 'Ghosts', reached the Top 150 of Germany's weekly airplay charts.
- Performed at Rock im Revier and Rockavaria in Germany.
- Performed alongside Iron Maiden and Iggy Pop at Rock in Vienna in Austria as part of their 30-day tour to promote their first official European release, Let the Night In (Deluxe Edition).
- Headlined at Kieler Woche, Hamburg Harley Days, (the biggest annual Harley Davidson gathering in Germany) and the UEFA Champions League Festival in Milan.
- Booked from July to September, to open as special guests for The BossHoss at a series of German festivals.
- Invited to headline the Rock Auf Der Burg Königstein and the Pflasterfest in Hameln, Germany.

=== Awards and nominations ===
Prime Circle have won several South African Music Awards for their albums and music videos, including Best Music Video of the Year at the SAMA XXI category as well as nominated for the MTV Africa Music Awards for Best Pop & Alternative Act and Best Music Video of the Year for their single DOORS off their album Let The Night In. The band was also nominated for Best Artist in African Rock at the All Africa Music Awards.

In 2023 Afri-Indie awarded Prime Circle the Highest Honour: Rock Royalty Award

== Concert tours ==
2007: Dubai Desert Rock Festival, Dubai.
Headliners for Dubai Desert Rock Festival included the likes of Iron Maiden, Stone Sour, In Flames, Incubus, Prodigy, The Bravery and more.

2010: Rock 'n India, India.

2011: Reload Festival , Germany.
Headliners ranged from Dropkick Murphys, Slash feat. Myles Kennedy & The Conspirators, Guano Apes, Puddle of Mudd and more.

2012: Homelandz Festival , UK.

2014: Graspop Metal Meeting, Belgium.
Played on the main stage alongside headliners Black Sabbath, Carcass and Napalm Death.

2016: Stage was shared with the likes of Rammstein, Slayer, Anthrax, Babymetal, Iggy Pop, Biffy Clyro, Monster Truck, Nightwish, Shinedown, and Iron Maiden.

- 2016 UEFA Champions League Final, Milan.
- Live from the official football festival of the UEFA Champions League.
- Rock im Revier Festival , Dortmund.
- Rockavaria Festival , Munich.
- Rock in Vienna , Austria.

2017: O2 Academy Islington, London.

2017: Snow Tunes Festival , Australia.

== Awards and nominations ==
Year	Organisation	Award	Nominated	Result
2005	Johannesburg Choice Award	Johannesburg Choice Award	Prime Circle	Won
2005	FHM	FHM Awards	Prime Circle	Won
2009	SAMA Awards	Record of the Year	"She always gets what she wants"	Nominated
2009	SAMA Awards	Best Rock Album – English	All or Nothing	Nominated
2010	SAMA Awards	Record of the Year	"Consider Me"	Nominated
2010	SAMA Awards	Best Global Chart Live DVD	All or Nothing LIVE DVD	Nominated
2011	SAMA Awards	Record of the Year	"Breathing"	Nominated
2011	SAMA Awards	Album of the Year	Jekyll & Hyde	Won
2011	SAMA Awards	Best Duo or Group	Prime Circle	Nominated
2011	SAMA Awards	Best Rock Album	Jekyll & Hyde	Nominated
2011	SAMA Awards	Best Producer	Theo Crous: Jekyll & Hyde	Nominated
2011	SAMA Awards	Best Album Packaging	Jekyll & Hyde	Nominated
2011	MK	International Break Through Act	Prime Circle	Won
2012	SAMA Awards	Record of the Year	"Turning in my sleep"	Nominated
2013	SAMA Awards	Best Rock Album	Evidence	Nominated
2013	SAMA Awards	Best Video	"Evidence"	Nominated
2013	SAMA Awards	Best Producer	Theo Crous: Evidence	Nominated
2015	Short&Sweet Music Video Awards	Best Rock Video	"Doors"	Won
2015	SAMA Awards	Best Rock Album	Let The Night In	Nominated
2015	SAMA Awards	Best Producer of the Year	Denholm Harding: Let The Night In	Nominated
2015	SAMA Awards	Best Engineer	Brendyn Rossouw: Let The Night In	Nominated
2015	SAMA Awards	Music Video of the Year	"Let The Night In"	Won
2015	MTN Africa Music Awards	Video of the Year	"Doors"	Won
2015	MTN Africa Music Awards	Best Pop & Alternative	Prime Circle	Nominated
2015	All African Music Awards	Best African Rock	Prime Circle	Nominated
2018	SAMA Awards	Best Rock Album	"If you don't you never will"	Nominated
2018	SAMA Awards	Duo/Group of the year	Prime Circle	Nominated
2025	Afri indi Awards	Best Rock Album	"The World We Know"	Won
2025	Afri indi Awards	Duo/Group of the year	Prime Circle	Won
2025	SAMA Awards	Best Rock Album	"The World We Know"	Nominated
2025	SAMA Awards	Duo/Group of the year	Prime Circle	

== Band members ==
Current members

- Dale Schnettler – drums, percussion, backing vocals (2008-present)
- Marco Gomes – bass, backing vocals (2000-present)
- Dirk Bisschoff – guitars (2000-present)
- Neil Breytenbach – keyboards (2007-present)
- Gavin Edwards – lead vocals, guitars (2024-present)

Former members

- Gerhard Venter – drums, backing vocals, percussion (2000-2008)
- Ross Learmonth – lead vocals, guitars (2000-2023)

== Discography ==
=== Studio albums ===
- Hello Crazy World (2002)
- Live This Life (2005)
- All or Nothing (2008)
- Jekyll & Hyde (2010)
- Evidence (2012)
- Let the Night In (2014)
- Let the Night In (Deluxe Edition) (2016)
- If You Don't You Never Will (2017)
- The World We Know (2024)

=== Compilations, special releases, Live Albums and DVD releases ===
- Hello Crazy World (Special Edition) (2003)
- Hello Crazy World (Double Disk Edition) (2004)
- Living in a Crazy World (Live DVD) (26 June 2006)
- Living in a Crazy World (CD/DVD) (2007)
- The Best of Prime Circle (5 October 2007)
- All or Nothing (Live DVD) (20 March 2009)
- All or Nothing (International Release) (19 June 2009)
- The Ultimate Prime Circle (1 September 2010)
- Live World (29 November 2019)

== See also ==
- List of South African musicians
