= Diamond/Over the Clouds =

"Diamond/Over the clouds"
- CD Cover

Single by Alan

from the album Japan Premium Best & More
- A-side: "Diamond"; "Over the Clouds"
- Released: February 3, 2010
- Recorded: 2010
- Genre: Pop
- Length: 4:27 ("Diamond"); 4:34 ("Over the clouds")
- Label: Avex Trax
- Songwriter(s): Seiko Fujibayashi, Narumi Yamamoto
- Producer(s): Kazuhito Kikuchi

Alan singles chronology
"Swear" (2009)	"Diamond/Over the clouds" (2010)	"'Kaze ni Mukau Hana'" (2010)

Alternative cover
- CD + DVD Cover

Alternative cover
- Limited Edition Cover

"Diamond/Over the Clouds" is a double A-side released by Chinese singer Alan. It was released in three different versions: a CD+DVD edition, a CD only edition, and a limited CD only edition. The ringtone is distributed since Jan 12, 2010, and CD is released from avex trax at Feb 3, 2010.

"Diamond" was used as the ending theme song for the NTV anime Inuyasha: The Final Act, while "Over the clouds" was used as the opening theme song for the PSP game God Eater.

== Track listing ==
=== CD ===
1. Diamond
  Lyricist: Seiko Fujibayashi, Composer: Kazuhito Kikuchi, Arranger: ats-
2. Over the clouds
  Lyricist: Narumi Yamamoto, Composer: Kazuhito Kikuchi, Arranger: Yuta Nakano
3. Diamond (Instrumental)
4. Over the clouds (Instrumental)

=== CD (Limited Edition) ===
1. Over the clouds
2. Diamond
3. Over the clouds (Instrumental)
4. Diamond (Instrumental)

=== DVD ===
1. Diamond (Music Video) (directed by: Wataru Takeishi)
2. "InuYasha Kanketsuhen" ED Animation Video
3. PSP Game "GOD EATER" OP Animation Video

== Certifications ==
Region	Certification	Certified units/sales
Japan (RIAJ) Digital single (Over the Clouds)	Gold	100,000^{*}
^{*} Sales figures based on certification alone.
