= Eva Cassidy discography =

- Studio albums: 6
- Live albums: 3
- Compilation albums: 2
- Singles: 10
- Video albums: 1
- Remix albums: 1

This article is a discography of Eva Cassidy, an American vocalist known for her interpretations of jazz, blues, folk, gospel, country and pop classics.

== Albums ==
=== Studio albums ===
Title	Album details	Peak chart positions										Certifications
Title	Album details	US	AUS	DEN	IRE	NLD	NZ	NOR	SWE	SWI	UK	Certifications
The Other Side (with Chuck Brown)	Released: 1992; Label: Liaison; Formats: CD, cassette	—	—	—	—	—	—	—	—	—	—	
Eva by Heart	Released: September 23, 1997; Label: Blix Street; Formats: CD, cassette	—	—	—	—	—	—	—	53	—	95	BPI: Gold
Time After Time	Released: June 20, 2000; Label: Blix Street; Formats: CD, LP, cassette	161	—	37	—	—	—	—	34	—	25	ARIA: Gold; BPI: Gold
Imagine	Released: August 20, 2002; Label: Blix Street; Formats: CD, LP, cassette	32	7	—	2	66	20	6	24	38	1	ARIA: Platinum; BPI: Platinum
Somewhere	Released: August 26, 2008; Label: Blix Street; Formats: CD, LP, digital download	136	78	—	15	48	32	11	12	—	4	BPI: Gold
Simply Eva	Released: January 25, 2011; Label: Blix Street; Formats: CD, LP, digital download	—	—	8	14	42	—	13	25	—	4	BPI: Gold
I Can Only Be Me (with the London Symphony Orchestra)	Released: March 3, 2023; Label: Blix Street; Formats: CD, LP, digital download	—	—	—	—	—	—	—	—	—	9	
"—" denotes album that did not chart or was not released

=== Compilation albums ===
Title	Album details	Peak chart positions									Certifications
Title	Album details	AUS	DEN	IRE	NLD	NZ	NOR	SWE	SWI	UK	Certifications
Songbird	Released: May 19, 1998; Label: Blix Street; Formats: CD, LP, cassette	42	9	1	52	25	7	2	2	1	RIAA: Platinum; ARIA: Platinum; BPI: 6× Platinum; IFPI SWI: Gold
Wonderful World	Released: July 24, 2004; Label: Blix Street; Formats: CD	—	70	—	—	—	—	36	—	11	BPI: Silver
The Best of Eva Cassidy	Released: October 26, 2012; Label: Blix Street; Formats: CD, LP, digital download	83	—	—	31	—	—	29	—	22	BPI: Platinum
Songbird 20	Released: March 2, 2018; Label: Blix Street; Formats: CD, digital download	—	—	—	—	—	—	—	—	—	
Acoustic	Released: January 15, 2021; Label: Blix Street; Formats: CD, digital download	—	—	—	—	—	—	—	—	—	
"—" denotes album that did not chart or was not released

=== Live albums ===
Title	Album details	Peak chart positions										Certifications
Title	Album details	US	AUS	DEN	IRE	NLD	NZ	NOR	SWE	SWI	UK	Certifications
Live at Blues Alley	Released: May 14, 1996; Label: Eva Music; Formats: CD, cassette	—	76	29	—	—	—	—	19	—	86	ARIA: Gold; BPI: Gold
American Tune	Released: August 12, 2003; Label: Blix Street; Formats: CD, LP, cassette	112	16	39	15	90	16	17	7	75	1	BPI: Gold
Nightbird	Released: November 13, 2015; Label: Blix Street; Formats: 2-CD, LP, digital download, vinyl box set	—	—	—	—	—	—	—	—	—	17	BPI: Gold
"—" denotes album that did not chart or was not released

=== Unofficial releases ===
Title	Album details
No Boundaries	Released: September 12, 2000; Label: Renata; Formats: CD, cassette

== Singles ==
Single	Year	Peak chart positions			Certifications	Album
Single	Year	IRE	SWE	UK	Certifications	Album
"The Christmas Song"/"That Spirit of Christmas" (with Chuck Brown)	1992	—	—	—		Christmas Duets
"Over the Rainbow"	1999	27	—	42	BPI: Gold	The Other Side
"People Get Ready"	2002	—	—	113		Live at Blues Alley
"Imagine"	2002	—	—	118		Imagine
"You Take My Breath Away"	2003	—	—	54		American Tune
"Fields of Gold"	2007	—	47	112	BPI: Gold	Live at Blues Alley
"What a Wonderful World" (with Katie Melua)	2007	—	19	1		Wonderful World
"Songbird"	2007	—	—	56	BPI: Platinum	Songbird
"Time After Time"	2012	—	—	79		Simply Eva
"Walkin' After Midnight"	2024	—	—	—		Non-album single
"—" denotes single that did not chart or was not released

== Video albums ==
Title	Details	Certification
Eva Cassidy Sings	Released: November 1, 2004; Label: Hot Records	ARIA: Gold
