= Songbird (Eva Cassidy album) =

Compilation album by Eva Cassidy
- Released: May 19, 1998
- Length: 42:51
- Label: Blix Street
- Producer: Eva Cassidy; Chris Biondo

Eva Cassidy chronology
Eva by Heart (1997)	Songbird (1998)	Time After Time (2000)

Professional ratings
Review scores
Source	Rating
AllMusic	4.5/5 stars
Rolling Stone	3.5/5 stars

Songbird is a compilation album of songs by American singer Eva Cassidy. It was released through Blix Street on May 19, 1998, two years after her death in 1996.

Five tracks ("Wade in the Water", "Wayfaring Stranger", "Songbird", "Time is a Healer" and "I Know You by Heart") are from Cassidy's album Eva by Heart. Four tracks ("Fields of Gold", "Autumn Leaves", "People Get Ready" and "Oh Had I a Golden Thread") are from her album Live at Blues Alley. The remaining track, "Over the Rainbow", is from the album The Other Side. The compilation album was certified Gold by the CRIA (50,000 units) in 2003. It was certified Gold by the RIAA in 2001 and Platinum in 2008 for shipments in excess of one million copies.

In 2018, a twentieth anniversary edition of the album was released, titled Songbird 20.

== Background ==
In May 1996, Eva Cassidy released the live album Live at Blues Alley, which was the last album released before her death six months later, at the age of 33. Near the end of Cassidy's life, local folk singer Grace Griffith sent a copy of the album to Bill Straw, the head of her label, Blix Street Records.

"It didn't take a genius to figure it out," Straw told The New York Times. "The moment I listened to that tape, I knew this was one of the best singers I'd ever heard."

Straw approached the Cassidy family to put together a new album. In 1998, a compilation of tracks from Cassidy's three released recordings was assembled into what would become Songbird. This CD lingered in relative obscurity for two years until it was given airplay by Terry Wogan on his wide-reaching BBC Radio 2 show Wake Up to Wogan, following recommendation by his producer Paul Walters. The album sold 100,000 more copies in the following months. The New York Times spoke of her "silken soprano voice with a wide and seemingly effortless range, unerring pitch and a gift for phrasing that at times was heart-stoppingly eloquent."

== Chart performance ==
The album was originally released in 1998, eighteen months on from Cassidy's death. At this point, she was virtually unknown in the United Kingdom, and Songbird only charted in the nether-regions of the UK Albums Chart. Two years after the album's release, however, Cassidy's music was brought to the attention of British audiences when her versions of "Fields of Gold" and "Over the Rainbow" were played by Mike Harding and Terry Wogan on BBC Radio 2. Following an overwhelming response, a camcorder recording of "Over the Rainbow", taken at Blues Alley in Georgetown, Washington, D.C. by her friend Bryan McCulley, was shown on BBC Two's Top of the Pops 2. Shortly afterwards, Songbird climbed to the top of the UK Albums Chart. It ended up being the eighth-biggest-selling album of 2001, and it has subsequently been certified 6× Platinum by the British Phonographic Industry (BPI) and has worldwide sales in excess of 5 million copies.

== Track listing ==
=== Original version ===
#	Title	Written by	Length
1.	"Fields of Gold"	Sting	4:42
2.	"Wade in the Water"	Traditional	4:02
3.	"Autumn Leaves"	Joseph Kosma, Johnny Mercer, Jacques Prévert	4:41
4.	"Wayfaring Stranger"	Traditional	4:26
5.	"Songbird"	Christine McVie	3:43
6.	"Time Is a Healer"	Diane Scanlon, Greg Smith	4:16
7.	"I Know You By Heart"	Eve Nelson, Scanlon	3:59
8.	"People Get Ready"	Curtis Mayfield	3:16
9.	"Oh, Had I a Golden Thread"	Pete Seeger	4:49
10.	"Over the Rainbow"	Harold Arlen, E.Y. Harburg	4:56

=== Songbird 20 version ===
#	Title	Length
11.	"Songbird (Acoustic)"	2:52
12.	"Wade in the Water (Acoustic)"	2:39
13.	"People Get Ready (Acoustic)"	3:27
14.	"Autumn Leaves (Acoustic)"	4:00

The tracks from Live at Blues Alley sound like studio cuts because Cassidy's stage patter and the audience applause have been removed.

== Personnel ==
- Eva Cassidy – guitar, keyboards, vocals, producer, arranger
- Chris Biondo – bass, rhythm guitar, producer, drum programming
- Dan Cassidy – violin
- Hilton Felton – organ
- John Gillespie – organ
- Keith Grimes – lead electric guitar
- Raice McLeod – drums
- Larry Melton – upright bass
- Mike Stein – violin
- Chris Walker – trumpet
- Lenny Williams – piano
- Kent Wood – organ, producer

== Charts ==
=== Weekly charts ===
Chart (1998–2001)	Peak position
Australian Albums (ARIA)	42
Danish Albums (Hitlisten)	9
Dutch Albums (Album Top 100)	52
Irish Albums (IRMA)	1
New Zealand Albums (RMNZ)	25
Norwegian Albums (VG-lista)	7
Swedish Albums (Sverigetopplistan)	2
Swiss Albums (Schweizer Hitparade)	2
UK Albums (OCC)	1
US Top Catalog Albums (Billboard)	1

=== Year-end charts ===
Chart (2001)	Position
German Albums (Offizielle Top 100)	56
Irish Albums (IRMA)	13
Swiss Albums (Schweizer Hitparade)	78
UK Albums (OCC)	8

Chart (2002)	Position
UK Albums (OCC)	70

Chart (2003)	Position
Swedish Albums (Sverigetopplistan)	15
UK Albums (OCC)	126

Chart (2004)	Position
UK Albums (OCC)	168

=== Decade-end charts ===
Chart (2000–09)	Position
UK Albums (OCC)	44

== Certifications ==
Certifications and sales for Songbird
Region	Certification	Certified units/sales
Australia (ARIA)	Platinum	70,000^{^}
Canada (Music Canada)	Gold	50,000^{^}
Denmark (IFPI Danmark)	2× Platinum	100,000^{^}
Norway (IFPI Norway)	Platinum	50,000^{*}
Spain (Promusicae)	2× Platinum	200,000^{^}
Sweden (GLF)	Gold	40,000^{^}
Switzerland (IFPI Switzerland)	Gold	25,000^{^}
United Kingdom (BPI)	6× Platinum	1,910,000
United States (RIAA)	Platinum	1,000,000^{^}
^{*} Sales figures based on certification alone.^{^} Shipments figures based on certification alone.

== Release history ==
Release dates and formats for Songbird
Region	Date	Formats	Editions	Labels	Refs.
Various	May 19, 1998	Cassette; CD; digital download; streaming	Standard	Blix Street Records, Inc	
Various	2 March 2018	CD; digital download; streaming	Deluxe	Blix Street Records, Inc	
