= Nightbird (Eva Cassidy album) =

Live album by Eva Cassidy
- Released: November 13, 2015
- Recorded: January 3, 1996
- Genre: Blues, jazz, folk
- Length: 2:19:54
- Label: Blix Street
- Producer: Eva Cassidy; Chris Biondo

Eva Cassidy chronology
The Best of Eva Cassidy (2012)	Nightbird (2015)	Acoustic (2017)

Nightbird is a 2-CD plus 1-DVD live album by American singer Eva Cassidy, released posthumously in November 2015, nineteen years after her death. The album was recorded at the Blues Alley club in Washington, D.C. in January 1996. Some of the tracks had previously been released on the 1996 album, Live at Blues Alley. The recordings have been remixed and remastered from the original tapes. Of the 31 songs, 12 are previously unreleased, including the title track "Nightbird" (written by Doug MacLeod), as well as the jazz standards "It Don't Mean a Thing (If It Ain't Got That Swing)" and "Fever". Of the 12 unreleased tracks, eight are previously unheard songs. The DVD which accompanies the 2 audio CDs contains 12 songs from the same set, of which 9 were previously included on the 2004 DVD release Eva Cassidy Sings and the remaining 3 are released for the first time.

== Critical reception ==
Matt Adams of The Herts Advertiser wrote: "An exceptional release, offering fresh insights into perhaps one of the greatest female vocalists of all time. Highly recommended."

Michael Bailey of All About Jazz said: "Nightbird reveals a modern song stylist not unlike Frank Sinatra. Cassidy's interpretative skills had few, if any, peers. She was equally at home with the Box Tops ("The Letter") and Bobby Troup ("Route 66"); Peggy Lee ("Fever") and Aretha Franklin ("Chain of Fools"). Her repertoire outside of the jazz standards and blues lay easily in the memory of anyone coming of age in the 1980s and '90s. Nightbird is a singular event to be savored and a talent too great to have experienced for such a short time."

== Track listing ==
CD 1

1. "Blue Skies" (Irving Berlin) *
2. "Ain't Doin' Too Bad" (Don Robey)
3. "Ain't No Sunshine" (Bill Withers)
4. "Fields of Gold" (Sting) *
5. "Baby I Love You" (Ronnie Shannon)
6. "Honeysuckle Rose" (Andy Razaf, Fats Waller) *
7. "Route 66" (Bobby Troup)
8. "Bridge over Troubled Water" (Paul Simon) *
9. Eva introduces the band
10. "Chain of Fools" (Don Covay)
11. "Fever" (John Davenport, Eddie Cooley)
12. "Autumn Leaves" (Johnny Mercer, Joseph Kosma, Jacques Prévert) *
13. "Fine and Mellow" (Billie Holiday) *
14. "Cheek to Cheek" (Irving Berlin) *
15. "It Don't Mean a Thing (If It Ain't Got That Swing)" (Duke Ellington, Irving Mills)
16. "Late in the Evening" (Paul Simon)
17. "Next Time You See Me" (Earl Forest, Bill Harvey)
18. "Waly Waly" (traditional, arranged by Eva Cassidy)

CD 2

1. "Take Me to the River" (Al Green, Teenie Hodges) *
2. "Nightbird" (Doug MacLeod)
3. "People Get Ready" (Curtis Mayfield) *
4. "The Letter" (Wayne Carson)
5. "Son of a Preacher Man" (John Hurley and Ronnie Wilkins)
6. "Stormy Monday" (T-Bone Walker) *
7. "Tall Trees in Georgia" (Buffy Sainte-Marie) *
8. "Something's Got a Hold on Me" (Etta James, Pearl Woods, Leroy Kirkland)
9. "Time After Time" (Cyndi Lauper)
10. "Over the Rainbow" (Yip Harburg, Harold Arlen)
11. "You're Welcome to the Club" (Sonny Thompson)
12. "Caravan" (Juan Tizol, Duke Ellington, Irving Mills)
13. "You've Changed" (Bill Carey, Carl T. Fischer)
14. "What a Wonderful World" (George David Weiss, Bob Thiele) *
15. "Oh, Had I a Golden Thread" (Pete Seeger) – studio recording *

DVD

1. "Cheek to Cheek" (Irving Berlin) **
2. "Nightbird" (Doug MacLeod)
3. "Honeysuckle Rose" (Andy Razaf, Fats Waller) **
4. "Autumn Leaves" (Johnny Mercer, Joseph Kosma, Jacques Prévert) **
5. "People Get Ready" (Curtis Mayfield) **
6. "Stormy Monday" (T-Bone Walker) **
7. "Tall Trees in Georgia" (Buffy Sainte-Marie) **
8. "Take Me to the River" (Al Green, Teenie Hodges)
9. "Bridge over Troubled Water" (Paul Simon)
10. "Time After Time" (Cyndi Lauper) **
11. "Over the Rainbow" (Yip Harburg, Harold Arlen) **
12. "You've Changed" (Bill Carey, Carl T. Fischer) **

* Previously released on Live at Blues Alley
** Previously released on Eva Cassidy Sings (DVD); "What a Wonderful World" from that collection is omitted here.

== Personnel ==
Musicians

- Eva Cassidy – vocals, acoustic guitar, electric guitar
- Chris Biondo – bass guitar
- Keith Grimes – electric guitar
- Raice McLeod – drums
- Lenny Williams – piano
- Hilton Felton – Hammond organ on "Oh Had I a Golden Thread"

Production

- Produced Eva Cassidy and Chris Biondo
- Recording: Sound by Charlie
- Engineering: Roy Battle
- Mixing: Chris Biondo, Eva Cassidy, Dan Weinberg, Geoff Gillette
- Mastering: Robert Vosgien, Dan Weinberg, Pete Norman
- Video restoration and editing: Darren Tiley
- Cover photograph: Larry Melton
- Liner notes essay: Bill Straw

== Chart positions ==
Weekly charts

Chart (2015)	Peak position
Dutch Albums (Album Top 100)	70
French Albums (SNEP)	149
German Albums (Offizielle Top 100)	99
UK Albums (OCC)	17

Year-end charts

Chart (2015)	Position
UK Albums (OCC)	90

== Release history ==
Country	Date	Format	Label	Catalogue
Worldwide	November 13, 2015	CD + DVD, LP, digital download, vinyl box set	Blix Street	G2-10209

== See also ==
- List of UK Independent Albums Chart number ones of 2015
