= List of UK Jazz & Blues Albums Chart number ones of 2011 =

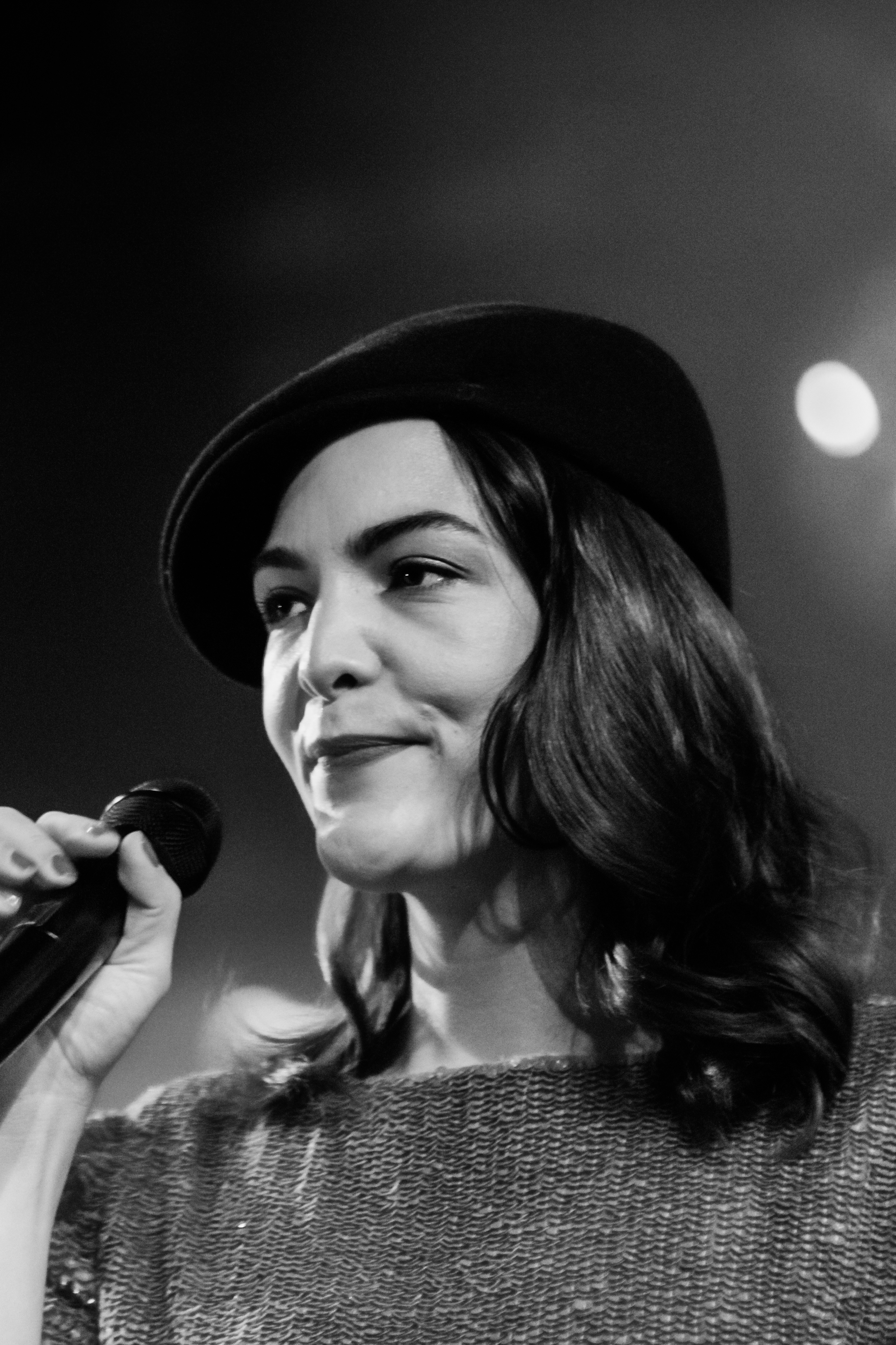
Caro Emerald's debut album Deleted Scenes from the Cutting Room Floor spent a total of 20 weeks at number one on the UK Jazz & Blues Albums Chart in 2011 over four separate spells.

The UK Jazz & Blues Albums Chart is a record chart which ranks the best-selling jazz and blues albums in the United Kingdom. Compiled and published by the Official Charts Company, the data is based on each album's weekly physical sales, digital downloads and streams. In 2011, 52 charts were published with eight albums at number one. The first number-one album of the year was Seasons of My Soul, the debut album by Rumer, which spent the first five weeks of the year atop the chart to complete a 13-week run. The last number-one album of the year was Caro Emerald's debut album Deleted Scenes from the Cutting Room Floor, which topped the last four charts of the year.

The most successful album on the UK Jazz & Blues Albums Chart in 2011 was Deleted Scenes from the Cutting Room Floor, which spent a total of 20 weeks at number one over four separate spells – two of six weeks and two of four weeks. Seasons of My Soul spent a total of 11 weeks at number one, while the posthumous Eva Cassidy album Simply Eva spent five weeks at number one in the spring. Two debut albums – Frank by Amy Winehouse and Let Them Talk by actor Hugh Laurie – spent five weeks each atop the UK Jazz & Blues Albums Chart. Deleted Scenes from the Cutting Room Floor finished 2011 as the 35th best-selling album of the year in the UK.

== Chart history ==
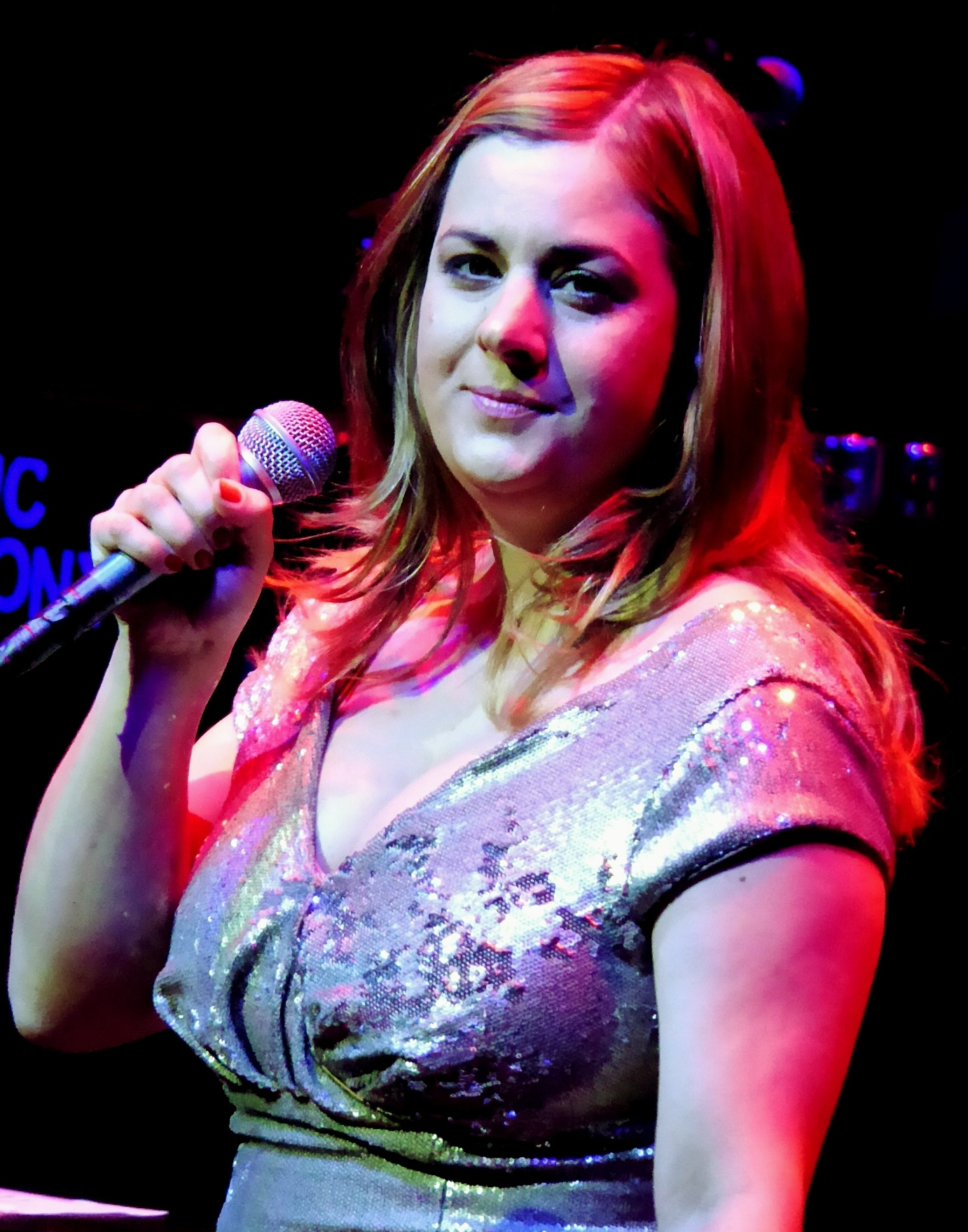
Rumer's debut album Seasons of My Soul, released in 2010, spent another 11 weeks at number one during 2011.

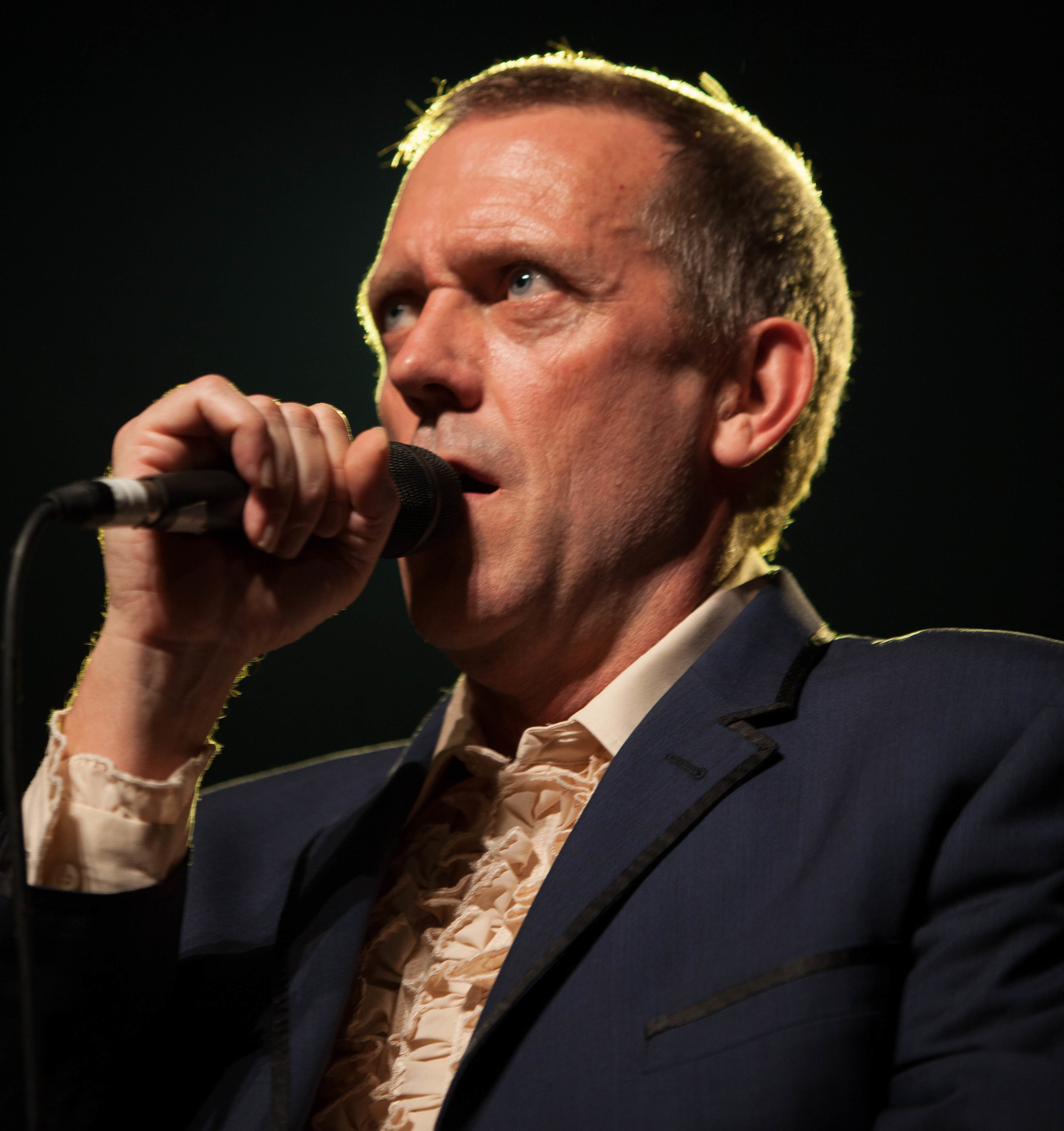
Hugh Laurie spent five weeks atop the UK Jazz & Blues Albums Chart in 2011 with his first album, Let Them Talk.

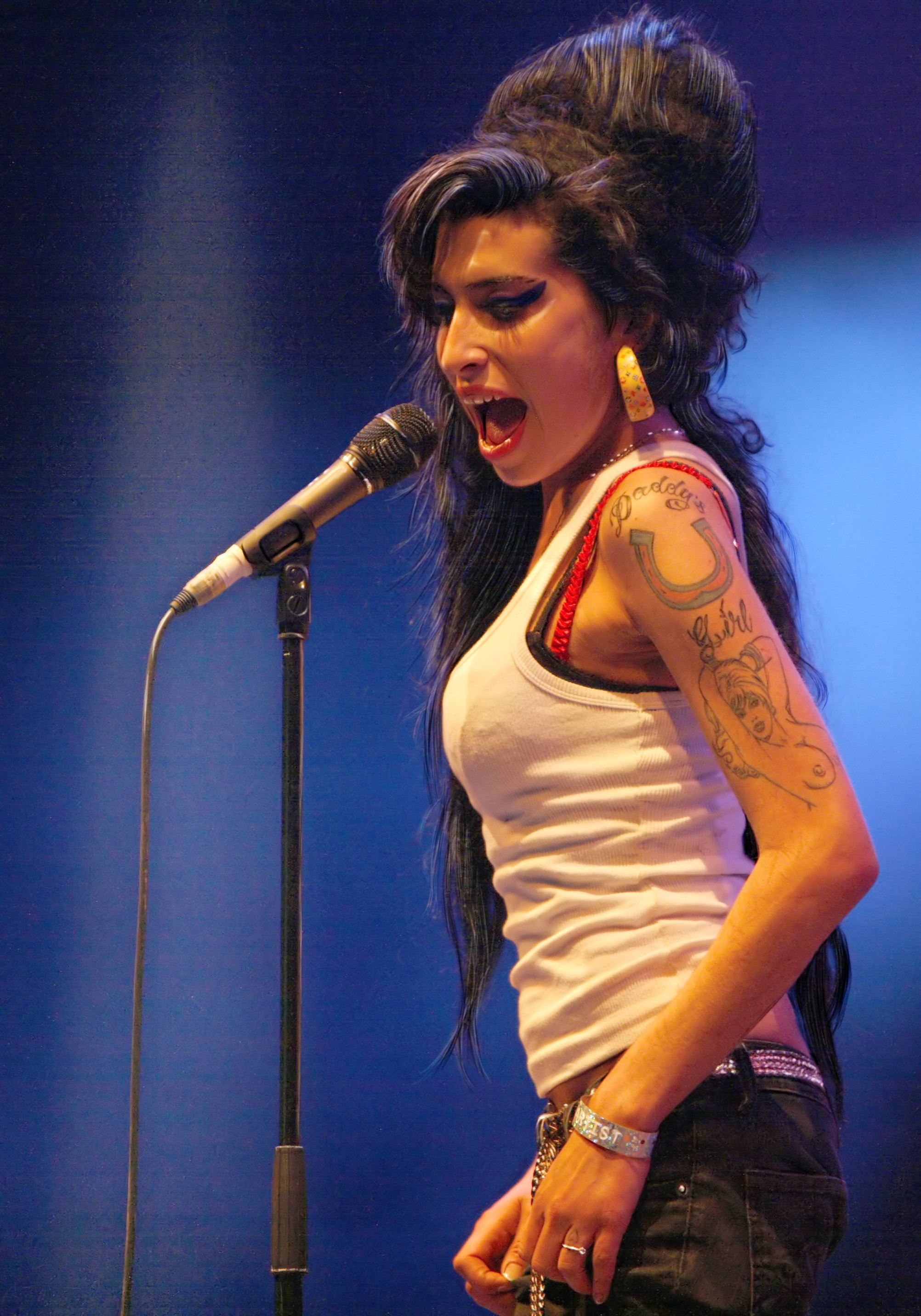
Frank by Amy Winehouse returned to the top spot twice in 2011, spending a total of five weeks at number one.

Key
†	Indicates best-selling jazz/blues album of 2011

Issue date	Album	Artist(s)	Record label(s)	Ref.
2 January	Seasons of My Soul	Rumer	Atlantic	
9 January	Seasons of My Soul	Rumer	Atlantic	
16 January	Seasons of My Soul	Rumer	Atlantic	
23 January	Seasons of My Soul	Rumer	Atlantic	
30 January	Seasons of My Soul	Rumer	Atlantic	
6 February	Simply Eva	Eva Cassidy	Blix Street	
13 February	Simply Eva	Eva Cassidy	Blix Street	
20 February	Simply Eva	Eva Cassidy	Blix Street	
27 February	Seasons of My Soul	Rumer	Atlantic	
6 March	Simply Eva	Eva Cassidy	Blix Street	
13 March	Simply Eva	Eva Cassidy	Blix Street	
20 March	Simply Eva	Eva Cassidy	Blix Street	
27 March	Dust Bowl	Joe Bonamassa	Provogue	
3 April	Simply Eva	Eva Cassidy	Blix Street	
10 April	Seasons of My Soul	Rumer	Atlantic	
17 April	Seasons of My Soul	Rumer	Atlantic	
24 April	Seasons of My Soul	Rumer	Atlantic	
1 May	Seasons of My Soul	Rumer	Atlantic	
8 May	Seasons of My Soul	Rumer	Atlantic	
15 May	Let Them Talk	Hugh Laurie	Warner	
22 May	Let Them Talk	Hugh Laurie	Warner	
29 May	Let Them Talk	Hugh Laurie	Warner	
5 June	You Can't Teach an Old Dog New Tricks	Seasick Steve	PIAS	
12 June	You Can't Teach an Old Dog New Tricks	Seasick Steve	PIAS	
19 June	Deleted Scenes from the Cutting Room Floor †	Caro Emerald	Dramatico	
26 June	Deleted Scenes from the Cutting Room Floor †	Caro Emerald	Dramatico	
3 July	Deleted Scenes from the Cutting Room Floor †	Caro Emerald	Dramatico	
10 July	Deleted Scenes from the Cutting Room Floor †	Caro Emerald	Dramatico	
17 July	Deleted Scenes from the Cutting Room Floor †	Caro Emerald	Dramatico	
24 July	Deleted Scenes from the Cutting Room Floor †	Caro Emerald	Dramatico	
31 July	Frank	Amy Winehouse	Island	
7 August	Frank	Amy Winehouse	Island	
14 August	Frank	Amy Winehouse	Island	
21 August	Frank	Amy Winehouse	Island	
28 August	Deleted Scenes from the Cutting Room Floor †	Caro Emerald	Dramatico	
4 September	Deleted Scenes from the Cutting Room Floor †	Caro Emerald	Dramatico	
11 September	Deleted Scenes from the Cutting Room Floor †	Caro Emerald	Dramatico	
18 September	Deleted Scenes from the Cutting Room Floor †	Caro Emerald	Dramatico	
25 September	Frank	Amy Winehouse	Island	
2 October	Don't Explain	Beth Hart, Joe Bonamassa	Provogue	
9 October	Deleted Scenes from the Cutting Room Floor †	Caro Emerald	Dramatico	
16 October	Deleted Scenes from the Cutting Room Floor †	Caro Emerald	Dramatico	
23 October	Deleted Scenes from the Cutting Room Floor †	Caro Emerald	Dramatico	
30 October	Deleted Scenes from the Cutting Room Floor †	Caro Emerald	Dramatico	
6 November	Deleted Scenes from the Cutting Room Floor †	Caro Emerald	Dramatico	
13 November	Deleted Scenes from the Cutting Room Floor †	Caro Emerald	Dramatico	
20 November	Let Them Talk	Hugh Laurie	Warner	
27 November	Let Them Talk	Hugh Laurie	Warner	
4 December	Deleted Scenes from the Cutting Room Floor †	Caro Emerald	Dramatico	
11 December	Deleted Scenes from the Cutting Room Floor †	Caro Emerald	Dramatico	
18 December	Deleted Scenes from the Cutting Room Floor †	Caro Emerald	Dramatico	
25 December	Deleted Scenes from the Cutting Room Floor †	Caro Emerald	Dramatico	

== See also ==
- 2011 in British music
