= I Know You by Heart =

I Know You by Heart may refer to:

- "I Know You by Heart", a duet by Dolly Parton and Smokey Robinson from Parton's 1987 album Rainbow
- "I Know You by Heart", a duet by Bette Midler and David Pack from the soundtrack for the 1988 film Beaches
- "I Know You by Heart", a song by Eva Cassidy from her 1997 album Eva by Heart
