= Steven Digman =

American songwriter

Steven Digman is an American musician, songwriter, journalist and inventor.

== Songwriting discography ==
- Eva by Heart (Eva Cassidy, 1998): "Say Goodbye"
- Time After Time (Eva Cassidy, 2000): "Easy Street Dream", "Anniversary Song"
- Call Off the Search (Katie Melua, 2005): "Anniversary Song"
- Looking for You (Janine Davy, 2005): "How Much Longer", "Valentines on Christmas Day", "Let’s Go Out Tonight", "Looking For You", "Crying", "Happy Hour", "Hungry For You", "Happy Love Song", "Turn On The Memories"

== Music imprints ==
- The Best of Eva Cassidy (2001) – "Easy Street Dream"
- The Eva Cassidy Songbook for Guitar (2005) – "Say Goodbye", "Anniversary Song"

== Invention ==
- Glow in the Dark Luminescent Violin Rosin; manufactured and distributed by Dodson's MFG.
