= Kathy's Song =

Song by Simon and Garfunkel

from the album Sounds of Silence
- Genre: Folk rock
- Length: 3:17
- Label: Columbia Records
- Songwriter(s): Paul Simon

"Kathy's Song" is a song originally by Paul Simon from his 1965 debut album The Paul Simon Songbook. It was re-recorded for Simon & Garfunkel's second album Sounds of Silence, released in 1966. It has been described as one of Simon's most personal songs; it is dedicated to Kathy Chitty, Simon's girlfriend and muse during his mid-1960s sojourn in England. It has also been included on most compilation albums of the duo, such as Tales from New York: The Very Best of Simon & Garfunkel, The Essential Simon and Garfunkel and Simon & Garfunkel's Greatest Hits.

== Critical reception ==
The Independent ranked "Kathy's Song" 18th among Simon & Garfunkel's 20 greatest songs, while Ultimate Classic Rock ranks it 10th and describes it as "uncomplicated" yet "Simon's prettiest song and one of the most gorgeous songs ever written". Gold Radio UK ranks it 12th.

== Other versions ==
On January 3, 1996, American singer Eva Cassidy recorded a version of "Kathy's Song". The track was included on her album Time After Time, released in 2000 four years after her death. Buzz McCain, writing for the Washington Post, called Cassidy's version "delicate". Arun Starkey for Far Out opined Cassidy's version could make a "strong claim to be better than the original."
