= Time After Time (Eva Cassidy album) =

Studio album by Eva Cassidy
- Released: June 20, 2000
- Recorded: January 3, 1996
- Genre: Adult alternative
- Length: 40:08
- Label: Blix Street Records
- Producers: Chris Biondo, Bill Straw, Lenny Williams

Eva Cassidy chronology
Songbird (1998)	Time After Time (2000)	No Boundaries (2000)

Professional ratings
Review scores
Source	Rating
AllMusic	3/5 stars
The Encyclopedia of Popular Music	4/5 stars

Time After Time is a studio album by American singer Eva Cassidy, released in 2000, four years after her death in 1996.

== Critical reception ==
The Washington Post wrote that "the songs have been lovingly, painstakingly digitized and sequenced so as to create a coherent album of tender, touching acoustic folk and minimally orchestrated pop that spotlights Cassidy's talent."

Arun Starkey, writing for Far Out, opined Cassidy's version of "Kathy's Song" could make a "strong claim to be better than the original."

== In popular culture ==
The cover song "Time After Time" was used in the popular series Smallville.

== Track listing ==
1. "Kathy's Song" (Paul Simon) – 2:47
2. "Ain't No Sunshine" (Bill Withers) – 3:26
3. "The Letter" (Wayne Carson Thompson) – 4:15
4. "At Last" (Mack Gordon, Harry Warren) – 2:58
5. "Time After Time" (Rob Hyman, Cyndi Lauper) – 4:00
6. "Penny to My Name" (Roger Henderson) – 3:41
7. "I Wandered By a Brookside" (music: Barbara Berry; words: Traditional from the Alfred Williams Collection, Swindon Library) – 3:31
8. "I Wish I Was a Single Girl Again" (Harlan Howard) – 2:29
9. "Easy Street Dream" (Steven Digman) – 3:20
10. "Anniversary Song" (Digman) – 2:54
11. "Woodstock" (Joni Mitchell) – 4:21
12. "Way Beyond the Blue" (Traditional) – 2:26

== Personnel ==
- Eva Cassidy - vocals, acoustic and electric guitars
- Chris Biondo - bass guitar
- Raice McLeod - drums
- Lenny Williams - piano
- Roger Henderson - acoustic guitar

== Production ==
- Producers: Chris Biondo, Bill Straw, Lenny Williams
- Engineer: Chris Biondo
- Mixing: Chris Biondo, Geoff Gillette, Eric Lemley
- Mastering: Robert Vosgien
- Design: Eileen White
- Paintings: Eva Cassidy
- Photography: Larry Melton
- Liner notes: Keith Grimes, Kevin Howlett

== Charts ==
Chart	Peak position
US Billboard 200	161
Danish Albums Chart	37
Swedish Albums Chart	34
UK Albums Chart	25
