= No Boundaries (Eva Cassidy album) =

Remix album by Eva Cassidy
- Released: September 12, 2000
- Recorded: 1987 – 1991 (vocals); music rearranged 1998–2000
- Genre: Adult alternative
- Length: 45:49
- Label: Renata Music Company
- Producer: Tony Taylor, Al Dale

Eva Cassidy chronology
Time After Time (2000)	No Boundaries (2000)	Imagine (2002)

Professional ratings
Review scores
Source	Rating
AllMusic	1.5/5 stars

No Boundaries is an unofficial CD release presenting recordings by the late American singer Eva Cassidy. Released in 2000, it is a collection of studio recordings from 1987 to 1991. The release was not endorsed by the Cassidy family, and was released by Renata Music Company, unlike her other albums, which were released by Blix Street Records. The album contains remixes of five tracks from her albums, four unreleased originals written by Tony Taylor, and a radio edit of "Emotional Step".

== Track listing ==
1. "Emotional Step" (Tony Taylor) – 4:50
2. "The Waiting Is Over" (David Christopher) – 3:26
3. "You Are" (Taylor) – 4:56
4. "(You Make Me Feel Like) A Natural Woman" (Gerry Goffin, Carole King, Jerry Wexler) – 3:39
5. "Little Children" (Christopher, Taylor) – 3:57
6. "I've Got This Feeling" (Taylor) – 4:38
7. "When It's Too Late" (Christopher) – 4:23
8. "On the Inside" (Taylor) – 4:04
9. "Emotional Step" [Radio Edit] (Taylor) – 4:28
10. "A Natural Woman (You Make Me Feel Like)" (Goffin, King, Wexler) – 3:33
11. "Little Children" (Christopher, Taylor) – 3:55

== Personnel ==
- Eva Cassidy – vocals
- David Christopher – acoustic guitar
- Ira Mayfield – guitar
- Tony Taylor – keyboards, background vocals

== Production ==
- Producer: Tony Taylor
- Executive producer: Tony Taylor
- Engineers: Chris Biondo, David Christopher, Tony Taylor
- Mixing: Tony Taylor
- Mastering: Charlie Pilzer
- Sequencing: Tony Taylor
- Arrangers: Tony Taylor, David Christopher
- Design: Eileen White
- Photography: David Christopher

== Charts ==
Album

Year	Chart	Position
2001	Top Independent Albums	29
2001	Top Internet Albums	20
