= Wonderful World (Eva Cassidy album) =

Compilation album by Eva Cassidy
- Released: July 24, 2004
- Genre: Adult Alternative
- Length: 44:35
- Label: Blix Street
- Producer: Eva Cassidy, Chris Biondo, Lenny Williams

Eva Cassidy chronology
American Tune (2003)	Wonderful World (2004)	Somewhere (2008)

Wonderful World is a compilation album by American singer Eva Cassidy, released in 2004, eight years after her death in 1996.

Professional ratings
Review scores
Source	Rating
AllMusic	link

== Track listing ==
1. "What a Wonderful World" (Bob Thiele, David Weiss) – 4:20
2. "Kathy's Song" (Paul Simon) – 2:45
3. "Say Goodbye" (Steven Digman, Andrew Hernandez) – 3:56
4. "Anniversary Song" (Steven Digman) – 2:51
5. "How Can I Keep from Singing?" (Traditional) – 4:27
6. "You Take My Breath Away" (Claire Hamill) – 5:40
7. "Drowning in the Sea of Love" (Kenneth Gamble, Leon Huff) – 4:18
8. "Penny to My Name" (Roger Henderson) – 3:39
9. "You've Changed" (Bill Carey, Carl Fischer) – 4:47
10. "It Doesn't Matter Anymore" (Paul Anka) – 3:13
11. "Waly Waly" (Traditional) – 4:39

== Personnel ==
- Eva Cassidy – acoustic guitar, guitar, vocals
- Chris Biondo – bass, electric guitar
- Chuck Brown – background vocals
- Laura Byrne – flute
- Mark Carson – piano
- Dan Cassidy – violin
- Steve Digman – guitar
- Carolene Evans – strings
- Mark Tufty Evans – strings, cello
- Anthony Flowers – Hammond organ
- Keith Grimes – acoustic guitar, guitar, electric guitar
- Ian Lawther – bagpipes
- Edgardo Malaga Jr. – strings
- Raice McLeod – drums
- Zan McLeod – bouzouki, guitar, mandolin
- Joanne Opgenorth – strings
- Uri Wassertzug – strings
- Lenny Williams – organ, piano, keyboards

== Production ==
- Producers: Eva Cassidy, Chris Biondo, Lenny Williams
- Mastering: Robert Vosgien
- Arranger: Eva Cassidy
- Drum Programming: Chris Biondo
- Compilation: Bill Straw
- Sequencing: Bill Straw
- Design: Eileen White
- Photography: Chris Biondo, Elaine Stonebraker
- Liner Notes: Kevin Howlett

== Charts ==
Chart	Peak position
Australian Albums (ARIA Charts)	70
Swedish Albums Chart	36
UK Albums Chart	11
