= Simply Eva =

Studio album by Eva Cassidy
- Released: January 25, 2011
- Recorded: 1994–96
- Label: Blix Street
- Producer: Chris Biondo, Eva Cassidy

Eva Cassidy chronology
Somewhere (2008)	Simply Eva (2011)	The Best of Eva Cassidy (2012)

Simply Eva is the eighth posthumous album by Eva Cassidy, released on 25 January 2011, fifteen years after her death in 1996. It's a collection of 11 acoustic tracks with Cassidy herself on the guitar and an a cappella version of "I Know You By Heart". The Blues Alley version of "Over the Rainbow", which was not included in the Live at Blues Alley album, is on this album. Digital downloads include the Christmas single "Silent Night" as a bonus track. Simply Eva hit #4 on the UK Charts on February 13, 2011, and was certified silver and gold on February 18, 2011. The album debuted at #52 on the Canadian Albums Chart.

== Critical reception ==
Professional ratings
Review scores
Source	Rating
AllMusic	3.5/5 stars
Daily Express	(4/5)

Simon Gage of the Daily Express noted "we have this celebration of the beautiful folk singer on a collection that is stripped back so that all there is left is the voice and a guitar."

Thom Jurek of AllMusic praised the album saying "If you're a fan, you need this; if you've been wondering what all the fuss is about, the naked intimacy of Simply Eva is among the most convincing arguments yet for her posthumous reputation."

Andy Gill of The Independent wrote "On previous releases, Cassidy has usually been accompanied by small ensembles, but here she's presented completely solo, with only her own acoustic guitar supporting her on such material as "Kathy's Song" and "Autumn Leaves", the intimacy of the latter leaving one feeling like an intruder on private reverie."

== Track listing ==
1. "Songbird" (Christine McVie)
2. "Wayfaring Stranger" (Traditional; arranged by Eva Cassidy)
3. "People Get Ready" (Curtis Mayfield)
4. "True Colors" (Billy Steinberg, Tom Kelly)
5. "Who Knows Where the Time Goes" (Sandy Denny)
6. "Over the Rainbow" (E.Y. Harburg, Harold Arlen)
7. "Kathy’s Song" (Paul Simon)
8. "San Francisco Bay Blues" (Jesse Fuller)
9. "Wade in the Water" (Traditional; arranged by Eva Cassidy)
10. "Time After Time" (Cyndi Lauper, Rob Hyman)
11. "Autumn Leaves" (Jacques Prévert, Johnny Mercer, Joseph Kosma)
12. "I Know You By Heart" (a cappella) (Diane Scanlon, Eve Nelson)

== Charts ==
=== Weekly charts ===
Chart (2011)	Peak position
Danish Albums (Hitlisten)	8
Dutch Albums (Album Top 100)	42
Irish Albums (IRMA)	14
Norwegian Albums (VG-lista)	13
Scottish Albums (OCC)	4
Swedish Albums (Sverigetopplistan)	25
UK Albums (OCC)	4
US Americana/Folk Albums (Billboard)	5

=== Year-end charts ===
Chart (2011)	Position
UK Albums (OCC)	54
