= I Can Only Be Me =

Studio album by Eva Cassidy
- Released: March 3, 2023
- Recorded: 1994–1996 (vocals); 2021 (orchestration)
- Label: Blix Street Records
- Producer: Chris Biondo, Eva Cassidy

Eva Cassidy chronology
| Acoustic (2017) | I Can Only Be Me (2023) |

I Can Only Be Me is the ninth posthumous album by Eva Cassidy, released on March 3, 2023, and is a collaboration between Blix Street Records and the London Symphony Orchestra.

== Background ==
In an interview with The Independent, Cassidy's former bandmate and arranger Chris Biondo shared, "Eva had a fantasy of one day having a full orchestra back her up ... to her, that was the greatest place you could be musically."

== Recording ==
Audio restoration technology developed by filmmaker Peter Jackson was used to strip Cassidy's voice from her original recordings, with the orchestrations being produced in 2021.

William Ross, who created the album's "Autumn Leaves" track, said: "I can't possibly find the words to adequately express my thoughts and feelings about Eva, one of the most unique, hypnotic, and powerful singers of all time. Her voice resonates through my whole being. I don't understand what she does to me ... but I'm stunned by the experience. Those familiar with her have been changed forever."

== Chart performance ==
The album debuted at number 9 on the UK Official Albums Chart.

== Critical reception ==
I Can Only Be Me received generally favorable reviews from music critics. The Music said that Cassidy was "one of the great singers of our generation" and, rating the album 4/5 stars, added that the release was filled with "beautiful, larger-than-life compositions, deeply rich in texture".

== Track listing ==
1. "Songbird" (Christine McVie)
2. "Autumn Leaves" (Jacques Prévert, Johnny Mercer, Joseph Kosma)
3. "People Get Ready" (Curtis Mayfield)
4. "Waly Waly" (Traditional; arranged by Eva Cassidy)
5. "Time After Time" (Cyndi Lauper, Rob Hyman)
6. "Tall Trees in Georgia" (Buffy St. Marie)
7. "Ain't No Sunshine" (Bill Withers)
8. "You've Changed" (Bill Carey, Carl Fischer)
9. "I Can Only Be Me" (Stevie Wonder)

== Charts ==
| Chart (2023) | Peak position |
|---|---|
| UK Albums (OCC) | 9 |
