= The Best of Eva Cassidy =

Compilation album by Eva Cassidy
- Released: November 6, 2012
- Genre: Easy listening, indie rock
- Label: Blix Street Records

Eva Cassidy chronology
Simply Eva (2011)	The Best of Eva Cassidy (2012)	Nightbird (2015)

The Best of Eva Cassidy is a compilation album by American singer Eva Cassidy, released in 2012 sixteen years after her death in 1996. The album has charted in Austria, The Netherlands, Sweden and the United Kingdom.

Professional ratings
Review scores
Source	Rating
Allmusic	4.4/5 stars

== Review ==
Steve Leggett of Allmusic gave the album 4.5 out of 5 saying, "(Cassidy) was a masterful song interpreter, able to take on almost any song in any style or genre and spin her voice around it, giving it a kind of haunting and sincere freshness. This set makes a great introduction to Cassidy's style and substance ".

Simon Gage of Express gave the album 4 out of 5 saying, "Cassidy's voice is honestly nothing extraordinary but somehow touching and lovely" concluding with "Simple and beautiful."

Lebohang Nthongoa of Times Live gave the album 9 out of 10 saying, "This album is all about beautiful music and pure singing talent, with no frills, bells or whistles! I find very little fault in this album: from the choice of songs to the way they are covered makes for a great album.”

== Track listing ==
1. "You Take My Breath Away" – 4:28
2. "Kathy's Song" – 2:47
3. "Songbird" – 3:47
4. "What a Wonderful World" – 4:21
5. "Wade in the Water" – 4:04
6. "Ain't No Sunshine" – 3:26
7. "Time After Time" – 3:59
8. "Autumn Leaves" – 4:44
9. "I Can Only Be Me" – 3:19
10. "Fields of Gold" – 4:45
11. "It Doesn't Matter Anymore" – 3:15
12. "Imagine" – 4:37
13. "Over the Rainbow" – 5:03
14. "True Colors" – 4:51
15. "Danny Boy" – 3:42
16. "People Get Ready" – 3:26
17. "Anniversary Song" – 2:54
18. "Early Morning Rain" – 4:06
19. "I Know You by Heart" – 4:05
20. "Tall Trees in Georgia" – 3:43

== Charts ==
Charts (2012)	Peak position
Austrian Albums (Ö3 Austria)	26
Dutch Albums (Album Top 100)	31
Scottish Albums (OCC)	19
Swedish Albums (Sverigetopplistan)	29
UK Albums Chart	22
UK Indie Chart	1

== Certifications ==
Region	Certification	Certified units/sales
United Kingdom (BPI)	Platinum	300,000^{‡}
^{‡} Sales+streaming figures based on certification alone.

== See also ==
- List of UK Indie Chart number-one albums of 2012
