= Method Actor =

- reissue artwork

Studio album by Method Actor
- Released: 1988
- Genre: Adult Alternative
- Length: 43:31
- Producer: David Christopher

Professional ratings
Review scores
Source	Rating
All About Jazz	(favorable)
Allmusic	3/5 stars

Method Actor is an album of the band Method Actor released in 1988 featuring American singer Eva Cassidy. It was unofficially re-released on CD in 2002.

== Track listing ==
1. "Getting Out" (David Christopher) – 4:19
2. "Look in to My Eyes" (Christopher) – 4:16
3. "When It's Too Late" (Christopher) – 5:00
4. "Laugh With Me" (Christopher) – 3:43
5. "Stay" (Christopher) – 5:24
6. "Little Children" (Christopher, Tony Taylor) – 3:31
7. "Forever" (Christopher) – 5:51
8. "End the Rain" (Christopher) – 4:21
9. "How Will It End" (Christopher, Ron Kent) – 3:38
10. "The Waiting Is Over" (Christopher) – 3:28

== Personnel ==
The group Method Actor

- Eva Cassidy – vocals
- Jimmy Campbell – drums
- David Christopher – acoustic guitar, electric guitar, keyboards
- Kenn Fiester – bass
- Robert Fiester – guitar

== Production ==
- Producer: David Christopher
- Engineer: Chris Biondo
- Liner notes: David Christopher
- Cover design sketches: Eva Cassidy
