= Imagine (Eva Cassidy album) =

Studio album by Eva Cassidy
- Released: August 20, 2002
- Genre: Adult Alternative
- Length: 40:41
- Label: Blix Street
- Producer: Eva Cassidy, Chris Biondo

Eva Cassidy chronology
No Boundaries (2000)	Imagine (2002)	American Tune (2003)

Professional ratings
Review scores
Source	Rating
AllMusic	4.5/5 stars
Rolling Stone	4/5 stars
The Sydney Morning Herald	(unfavorable)

Imagine is the third studio album (sixth overall) by American singer Eva Cassidy. Released in 2002, six years after her death, it peaked on the U.S. Billboard Top 200 at No. 32, and was her second U.K. No. 1 album.

== Track listing ==
#	Title	Written by	Length
1.	"It Doesn't Matter Anymore"	Paul Anka	3:13
2.	"Fever"	Eddie Cooley, John Davenport	3:57
3.	"Who Knows Where the Time Goes?"	Sandy Denny	5:41
4.	"You've Changed"	Bill Carey, Carl Fischer	4:48
5.	"Imagine"	John Lennon and Yoko Ono	4:36
6.	"Still Not Ready"	Chris Izzi, Leo LaSota	4:48
7.	"Early Morning Rain"	Gordon Lightfoot	4:05
8.	"Tennessee Waltz"	Pee Wee King, Redd Stewart	2:33
9.	"I Can Only Be Me"	Stevie Wonder	3:17
10.	"Danny Boy"	Frederic Weatherly	3:43

== Personnel ==
Eva Cassidy	guitar, rhythm guitar, vocals, background vocals
Darrel Andrews	percussion
Chris Biondo	bass
Dan Cassidy	violin
Adrian Green	drums
Keith Grimes	guitar, electric guitar
Raice McLeod	drums
Larry Melton	bass
Bruno Nasta	violin
Lenny Williams	piano, vibraphone
Kent Wood	organ, synthesizer, synthesizer strings

== Production ==
Producers	Eva Cassidy, Chris Biondo
Mixing	Geoff Gillette
Mastering	Robert Vosgien
Artwork	Eva Cassidy
Photography	Larry Melton
Liner Notes	Bill Straw
Compilation	Bill Straw

== Charts ==
Chart (2002)	Peak position
US Billboard 200	32
US Top Independent Albums	1
US Top Internet Albums	32

== Certifications ==
Region	Certification	Certified units/sales
Australia (ARIA)	Platinum	70,000^{^}
Norway (IFPI Norway)	Gold	20,000^{*}
United Kingdom (BPI)	Platinum	300,000^{^}
^{*} Sales figures based on certification alone.^{^} Shipments figures based on certification alone.
