= American Tune (album) =

Live album by Eva Cassidy
- Released: August 12, 2003
- Genre: Adult Alternative
- Length: 40:04
- Label: Blix Street
- Producer: Chris Biondo

Eva Cassidy chronology
Imagine (2002)	American Tune (2003)	Wonderful World (2004)

Professional ratings
Review scores
Source	Rating
Allmusic	4/5 stars

American Tune is an album of rehearsal tapes and live recordings by American singer Eva Cassidy, released in 2003, seven years after her death in 1996. It was her second album of mainly live material and her third posthumous album. American Tune spent five weeks on the U.S. Billboard Top 200, and was a UK number one album.

== Reception ==
Writing for Sing Out! magazine, Jamie Anderson calls every song on the album "a gem...either remaining true to the original song or presenting the piece in a new way without syrupy trappings".

== Track listing ==
1. "Drowning in the Sea of Love" [live] (Kenneth Gamble, Leon Huff) – 4:19
2. "True Colors" [live] (Thomas Kelly, Billy Steinberg) – 4:50
3. "The Water Is Wide" [live] (Traditional) – 4:20
4. "Hallelujah I Love Him So" (Ray Charles) – 2:33
5. "God Bless the Child" [live] (Arthur Herzog Jr., Billie Holiday) – 5:17
6. "Dark Eyed Molly" [live] (Archie Fisher) – 3:28
7. "American Tune" [live] (Paul Simon) – 4:06
8. "It Don't Mean a Thing (If It Ain't Got That Swing)" [live] (Duke Ellington, Irving Mills) – 2:23
9. "Yesterday" (Lennon–McCartney) – 3:09
10. "You Take My Breath Away" [live] (Claire Hamill) – 5:39

== Personnel ==
- Eva Cassidy – guitar, rhythm guitar, vocals
- Chris Biondo – bass
- Jimmy Campbell – drums
- Dan Cassidy – violin
- Keith Grimes – electric guitar
- Marcy Marxer – bouzouki, guitar, tin whistle
- Raice McLeod – drums
- Bruno Nasta – violin
- Lenny Williams – organ, piano

== Production ==
- Producer: Chris Biondo
- Engineers: Chris Biondo, Cathy Fink, Bryan McCulley
- Mastering: Robert Vosgien
- Technical assistance: Brian Grant
- Arranger: Eva Cassidy
- Overdubs: Marcy Marxer, Geoff Gillette
- Sequencing: Bill Straw
- Design: Eileen White
- Photography: Chris Biondo
- Drawing: Eva Cassidy
- Liner notes: Martin Jennings
- Compilation: Bill Straw

== Charts ==
=== Weekly charts ===
Chart (2003)	Peak position
Australian Albums (ARIA)	16
Danish Albums (Hitlisten)	39
Dutch Albums (Album Top 100)	90
German Albums (Offizielle Top 100)	85
Irish Albums (IRMA)	15
New Zealand Albums (RMNZ)	16
Norwegian Albums (VG-lista)	17
Scottish Albums (Official Charts)	1
Swedish Albums (Sverigetopplistan)	7
Swiss Albums (Schweizer Hitparade)	75
UK Albums (Official Charts)	1
US Billboard 200	112

=== Year-end charts ===
Chart (2003)	Position
UK Albums (OCC)	73

== Certifications ==
Region	Certification	Certified units/sales
Sweden (GLF)	Gold	30,000^{^}
United Kingdom (BPI)	Gold	100,000^{^}
^{^} Shipments figures based on certification alone.
