= Over the Rainbow =

1939 song by Harold Arlen and Yip Harburg

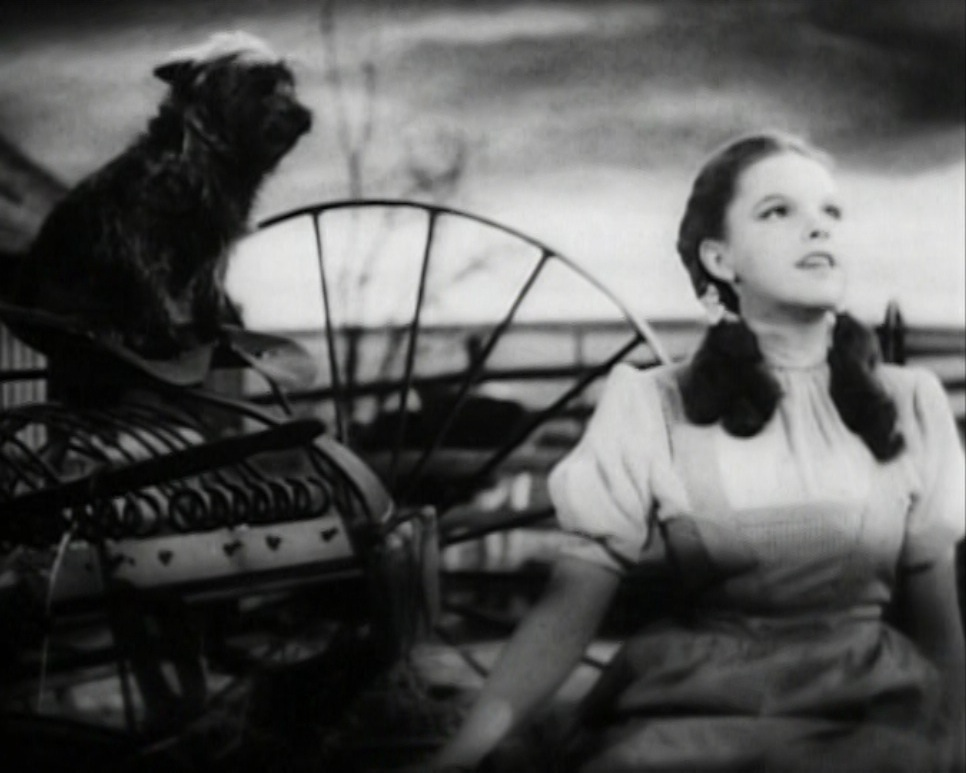
- Judy Garland singing "Over the Rainbow" in The Wizard of Oz

Song by Judy Garland

from the album The Wizard of Oz (1956)
- Published: 1939 by Leo Feist, Inc.
- Studio: MGM soundstages
- Composer: Harold Arlen
- Lyricist: E.Y. Harburg

"Over the Rainbow" from The Wizard of Oz
Sample of the original film version

"Over the Rainbow", also known as "Somewhere Over the Rainbow", is a ballad by Harold Arlen with lyrics by Yip Harburg. It was written for the 1939 film The Wizard of Oz, in which it was sung by actress Judy Garland in her starring role as Dorothy Gale.

About five minutes into the film, Dorothy sings the song after failing to get Aunt Em, Uncle Henry, and the farmhands to listen to her story of an unpleasant incident involving her dog, Toto, and the town spinster, Miss Gulch (Margaret Hamilton). Aunt Em tells her to "find [her]self a place where [she] won't get into any trouble". This prompts her to walk off by herself, musing to Toto, "Someplace where there isn't any trouble. Do you suppose there is such a place, Toto? There must be. It's not a place you can get to by a boat, or a train. It's far, far away. Behind the moon, beyond the rain", at which point she begins singing.

"Over the Rainbow" won the Academy Award for Best Original Song and became Garland's signature song. It has been included in several all-time lists, and has been covered by several artists in varying languages. In 2017, it was selected for induction into the National Recording Registry by the Library of Congress as being "culturally, historically, or aesthetically significant". The song was almost cut from the film because the studio felt a slow ballad early on stalled the story; the film's producer and director, however, insisted it remain.

== Writing and composition ==
Song opening, comparison with Mascagni's Ratcliff

Composer Harold Arlen and lyricist Yip Harburg often worked in tandem, Harburg generally suggesting an idea or title for Arlen to set to music, before Harburg contributed the lyrics. For their work together on The Wizard of Oz, Harburg claimed his inspiration was "a ballad for a little girl who... was in trouble and... wanted to get away from... Kansas. A dry, arid, colorless place. She had never seen anything colorful in her life except the rainbow". Arlen decided the idea needed "a melody with a long broad line".

By the time all the other songs for the film had been written, Arlen was feeling the pressure of not having the song for the Kansas scene. He often carried blank pieces of music manuscript in his pockets to jot down short melodic ideas. Arlen described how the inspiration for the melody to "Over the Rainbow" came to him suddenly while his wife Anya drove:

"I said to Mrs. Arlen... 'let's go to Grauman's Chinese ... You drive the car, I don't feel too well right now.' I wasn't thinking of work. I wasn't consciously thinking of work, I just wanted to relax. And as we drove by Schwab's Drug Store on Sunset I said, 'Pull over, please.' ... And we stopped and I really don't know why—bless the muses—and I took out my little bit of manuscript and put down what you know now as 'Over the Rainbow.'"

The song was originally sung in A-flat major. Arlen later wrote the contrasting bridge section based on the idea of "a child's piano exercise".

== Recordings by Judy Garland ==
On October 7, 1938, Judy Garland recorded the song for the film on the MGM soundstage with an arrangement by Murray Cutter. A renowned Stradivarius violin was used in the accompaniment.

"Over the Rainbow"

Single by Judy Garland

from the album The Wizard of Oz (1939)
- B-side: "The Jitterbug"
- Released: 1939
- Recorded: July 28–29, 1939
- Label: Decca

In late July 1939, Garland recorded the song for the record label Decca, which she was under contract to. This song and "The Jitterbug", which was planned to be in the film but eventually got rejected, from the same recording sessions are the only songs from The Wizard of Oz that Judy Garland recorded commercially. And it was this recording, not the one from the film soundtrack, that was released on the 78-rpm gramophone record that was part of the Decca four-record album titled The Wizard of Oz. Although this is not the version that appeared in the film, the "studio cast album" was commercially successful, and Decca continued to release it into the 1960s, also reissuing on 33 1/3 rpm.

The film version of "Over the Rainbow" was unavailable for purchase on record until The Wizard of Oz soundtrack album was released by MGM in 1956 to coincide with the television premiere of the movie. The soundtrack album has been re-released several times over the years, including a deluxe edition issued on Rhino Records in 1995.

After the film The Wizard of Oz appeared in 1939, "Over the Rainbow" became Garland's signature song. She performed it for thirty years and sang it in the same way as she did for the film. She said she wanted to remain true to the character of Dorothy and to the message of being somewhere over the rainbow.

In 1981, Judy Garland's original 1939 Decca gramophone record of "Over the Rainbow" was inducted into the Grammy Hall of Fame.

== Other lyrics ==
An introductory verse ("When all the world is a hopeless jumble...") that was omitted from the film is sometimes used in theatrical productions of The Wizard of Oz and is included in the piano sheet music from the film. It was used in versions by Cliff Edwards, Tony Bennett, Al Bowlly, Doris Day, Ella Fitzgerald, Frank Sinatra, Sarah Vaughan, Mandy Patinkin, Trisha Yearwood, Melissa Manchester, Hilary Kole, Jewel, Eva Cassidy, and Norma Waterson. Judy Garland sang the introductory verse at least once, on a 1948 radio broadcast of The Louella Parsons Show. Lyrics for a second verse ("Once by a word only lightly spoken...") appeared in the British edition of the sheet music.

== Resemblance to other compositions ==
Italian newspaper Il Messaggero has noted a resemblance, both harmonic and melodic, between Over the Rainbow and the theme of the intermezzo (known as Ratcliff's Dream) of Pietro Mascagni's 1895 opera Guglielmo Ratcliff.

== Awards and honors ==
In March 2017, Judy Garland's 1939 Decca single was entered in the National Recording Registry by the Library of Congress as music that is "culturally, historically, or aesthetically significant". The Recording Industry Association of America (RIAA) and the National Endowment for the Arts (NEA) ranked it number one on their Songs of the Century list. The American Film Institute named it the best movie song on the AFI's 100 Years...100 Songs list.

"Over the Rainbow" was given the Towering Song Award by the Songwriters Hall of Fame and was sung at its dinner on June 12, 2014, by Jackie Evancho. In April 2005, the United States Postal Service issued a commemorative stamp honoring Yip Harburg that includes a lyric.

It was sent as an audio wakeup call to astronauts aboard the STS-88 space shuttle mission on Flight Day 4, dedicated to astronaut Robert D. Cabana by his daughter Sara. In June 2026, CBS News included the song in its list of the 250 essential American songs of the past 250 years.

== Legacy ==
People have speculated that Gilbert Baker's creation of the rainbow flag was inspired by the song (Garland being among the first gay icons), but when asked, Baker said that it was "more about the Rolling Stones and their song 'She's a Rainbow.'"

According to the family of Gene Wilder, the song was one of his favorites, and he was listening to Ella Fitzgerald's recording of it when he died.

The composition was originally copyrighted in 1938, and it had its copyright renewed in 1965.

== German versions ==
The first German version in the English language was recorded by Heinz Wehner's (1908–1945) Telefunken-Swing-Orchester in March 1940 in Berlin. Wehner, at this time a well-known international German swing artist, also provided the vocals. The first German version in German language was sung by Inge Brandenburg (1929–1999) in 1960.

== Israel Kamakawiwoʻole version ==
"Somewhere Over the Rainbow/What a Wonderful World"

Song by Israel Kamakawiwoʻole

from the album Facing Future
- Released: November 1, 1993
- Recorded: 1988
- Studio: Audio Resources Hawai'i, Honolulu
- Length: 5:07
- Label: Mountain Apple Company
- Songwriters: E.Y. Harburg, Bob Thiele, George David Weiss

=== Recording session ===
On the album Facing Future (1993), Israel Kamakawiwoʻole included "Over the Rainbow" in a ukulele medley with "What a Wonderful World" by Louis Armstrong. At 3 a.m one morning in 1988, Kamakawiwo'ole called a recording studio to request a session. Its owner and engineer, Milan Bertosa, agreed to record him if he could get there in 15 minutes.

Bertosa said, "And in walks the largest human being I had seen in my life. Israel was probably like 500 pounds. And the first thing at hand is to find something for him to sit on." A security guard gave Israel a large steel chair. "Then I put up some microphones, do a quick sound check, roll tape, and the first thing he does is 'Somewhere Over the Rainbow.' He played and sang, one take, and it was over."

Bertosa hung onto that tape and when Kamakawiwoʻole was recording Facing Future five years later he suggested that the song be included on that album, which went on to become the best-selling Hawaiian album of all time.

=== Chart activity and sales ===
Kamakawiwoʻole's version reached number 12 on the Billboard Hot Digital Tracks chart during the week of January 31, 2004 (for the survey week ending January 18, 2004). In the U.S., it was certified Platinum for million downloads sold. As of October 2014 it had sold over 4.2 million digital copies.

In the UK his version was released as a single under the title "Somewhere Over the Rainbow". It entered the UK Official Singles Chart in April 2007 at number 68. In Germany, the single also returned to the German Singles Chart in September 2010. After two weeks on that chart, it received gold status for selling 150,000 copies. In October 2010, it reached number one on the German charts. In 2011 it was certified 5× gold for selling over 750,000 copies. It stayed at the top spot for twelve non-consecutive weeks and was the most successful single in Germany in 2010. In March 2010 it was the second best-selling download in Germany with digital sales between 500,000 and 600,000. In France, it debuted at number four in December 2010 and reached number one. In Switzerland, it received Platinum status for 30,000 copies sold.

Kamakawiwoʻole's version of "Over the Rainbow" has been used in commercials, films and television programs, including 50 First Dates, Charmed, Cold Case, ER, Finding Forrester, Horizon, Life on Mars, Meet Joe Black, Scrubs, Snakes on a Plane, Son of the Mask, and the television series South Pacific. The Kamakawiwoʻole version was sung by the cast of Glee on the season one finale "Journey to Regionals" and included on the EP Glee: The Music, Journey to Regionals, charting at number 30 in the UK, 31 in Canada and Ireland, 42 in Australia, and 43 in the U.S.

=== Certifications ===
Region	Certification	Certified units/sales
Austria (IFPI Austria)	Platinum	50,000^{*}
Germany (BVMI)	2× Platinum	1,000,000^{^}
Italy (FIMI)	Gold	25,000^{‡}
Switzerland (IFPI Switzerland)	2× Platinum	100,000^{^}
United Kingdom (BPI)	Gold	400,000^{‡}
United States (RIAA)	Platinum	4,200,000
^{*} Sales figures based on certification alone.^{^} Shipments figures based on certification alone.^{‡} Sales+streaming figures based on certification alone.

== Eva Cassidy version ==
"Over the Rainbow"

Single by Eva Cassidy

from the album The Other Side and Songbird
- B-side: "Dark End of the Street"
- Released: January 29, 2001
- Length: 4:58
- Label: Blix Street
- Composer: Harold Arlen
- Lyricist: E.Y. Harburg
- Producer: Chris Biondo

Eva Cassidy singles chronology
"Over the Rainbow" (2001)	"People Get Ready" (2002)

Eva Cassidy recorded a studio version of the song for The Other Side (1992). After her death in 1996, it was included on the posthumous compilation Songbird (1998). In December 2000, a clip of Cassidy performing the song at Blues Alley was featured on the BBC2 program Top of the Pops 2. Following the premiere, it became the program's most-requested video in history, and demand for the album soared after the clip was re-aired in January 2001. The song was subsequently released as a single the same month, on January 29. In the United States, the song was serviced to adult contemporary and smooth jazz radio on June 4, 2001.

"Over the Rainbow" debuted at number 88 on the UK Singles Chart in February 2001 and climbed to number 42 in May, becoming Cassidy's first single to chart in the United Kingdom. In Scotland, it reached number 36, giving Cassidy her first top-40 single in that region. It was her highest-charting song in the United Kingdom until 2007, when "What a Wonderful World" reached number one. The song also reached number 27 in Ireland in December, becoming her only top-40 hit in that country.

Cassidy's recording was selected by the BBC for its Songs of the Century album in 1999. Her performance at Blues Alley appeared on the album Simply Eva (2011).

=== Charts ===
Chart (2001)	Peak position
Ireland (IRMA)	27
Scottish Singles Sales (Official Charts)	36
UK Singles (Official Charts)	42
UK Indie (Official Charts)	10

=== Certifications ===
Region	Certification	Certified units/sales
United Kingdom (BPI)	Gold	400,000^{‡}
^{‡} Sales+streaming figures based on certification alone.

== Cliff Richard version ==
"Somewhere Over the Rainbow/What a Wonderful World"

Single by Cliff Richard

from the album Wanted
- Released: December 3, 2001
- Length: 4:47
- Label: Papillon
- Songwriters: H. Arlen, E.Y. Hamburg, George David Weiss, G. Douglas
- Producer: Alan Tarney

Cliff Richard singles chronology
"The Millennium Prayer" (1999)	"Somewhere Over the Rainbow/What a Wonderful World" (2001)	"Let Me Be the One" (2002)

Music video
- "Somewhere Over the Rainbow/What a Wonderful World" on YouTube

On December 3, 2001, the British singer Cliff Richard recorded a cover of the mashup "Somewhere Over the Rainbow/What a Wonderful World" on his album Wanted. At the time of release the official website for the album explained that it consisted of "hits Cliff's always 'Wanted' to record." The album is primarily made up of cover songs, including songs by artists such as Elvis Presley, the Beatles, Carole King and Tina Turner. The inspiration for the album came when Richard was sent a copy of Israel Kamakawiwo'ole's recording of "Over the Rainbow" combined with "What a Wonderful World" weeks into the year 2000 and he knew immediately he wanted to record it.

The mashup reggae-themed track with a lot of similarities to the Israel Kamakawiwo'ole arrangement was released as the debut single from the album Wanted and charted on the UK Singles Chart peaking at number 11 and stayed for six weeks on the UK chart. Richard premiered it on the Open House with Gloria Hunniford on November 6, 2001. On the date of release of the single on December 3, 2001, he was invited to the ITV program This Morning to perform it live. He also performed it at the Premier Christmas Spectacular at Methodist Westminster Central Hall in London on December 14, 2001.

=== Charts ===
Chart (2001)	Peak position
UK Singles (Official Charts)	11

== Danielle Hope version ==
"Over the Rainbow"

Single by Danielle Hope
- Released: May 23, 2010 (UK)
- Genre: Pop
- Length: 2:58
- Label: Polydor
- Composer: Harold Arlen
- Lyricist: E.Y. Harburg

Danielle Hope, the winner of the BBC talent show Over the Rainbow, released a cover version of the song as a digital download on May 23, 2010, and a single on May 31, 2010. As it was recorded before a winner was announced, runners-up Lauren Samuels and Sophie Evans also recorded versions.

The single was a charity record that raised money for the BBC Performing Arts Fund and Prostate UK.

=== Track listings ===
UK digital download

1. "Over the Rainbow" – 2:58

CD single

1. "Over the Rainbow"
2. "The Wizard of Oz medley" – Sophie Evans, Danielle Hope and Lauren Samuels

=== Charts ===
Chart (2010)	Peak position
UK Singles (Official Charts)	29

== Robin Schulz, Alle Farben and Israel Kamakawiwoʻole version ==
"Somewhere Over the Rainbow / What a Wonderful World"

Song by Robin Schulz, Alle Farben and Israel Kamakawiwoʻole
- Released: September 7, 2021
- Length: 3:31
- Label: Sony Music Entertainment, B1/Warner Music
- Composer: Harold Arlen
- Lyricist: E.Y. Harburg

In July 2021, German musician, DJ and record producer Robin Schulz and the German DJ and producer Alle Farben released a mashup "Somewhere Over the Rainbow / What a Wonderful World" based on Kamakawiwo'ole's version and voice on Sony Music Entertainment, B1/Warner Music. The new remix version has charted in Germany, France and Belgium. A new official video was also released.

=== Charts ===
Chart (2021)	Peak position
Belgium (Ultratop 50 Wallonia)	48
France (SNEP)	138
Germany (GfK Entertainment charts)	82

== Other versions ==
The 1939 Glenn Miller recording on RCA Bluebird was No. 1 on the Your Hit Parade chart for six weeks that year.

Bing Crosby sang a radio version of "Over The Rainbow" on his Kraft Music Hall show on January 7, 1943.

The Demensions recorded an ethereal, orchestral, and dreamy doo-wop version, arranged by composer Seymour Barab that reached number 16 on the Billboard Hot 100 in 1960 and number 17 in Canada. In 1978, Gary Tanner's recording of "Somewhere over the Rainbow" reached number 69 on the Hot 100. Katharine McPhee's version in 2006 reached number 12 on the Billboard Hot 100.

In 1965 Australian band Billy Thorpe and the Aztecs released the song as a single following the release of an EP called I Told the Brook in 1964. The single went to number 2 on the Australian charts.

Jerry Lee Lewis included "Over the Rainbow" on his 1980 album Killer Country on Elektra Records. This version went to number 10 on the Pop Country charts.

The song was featured in Joanie Bartels' 1987 album Lullaby Magic, Vol. 2.

German-Greek electronic dance music producer and DJ Marusha released a cover version of the track in 1994, which became a Top 40 hit in central Europe, reaching the Top 10 in Switzerland (No. 2), Germany (No. 3), and the Netherlands (No. 6); it also reached No. 13 in Austria and No. 34 in the Flanders region of Belgium.

The 1997 film Face/Off featured a recording of "Over the Rainbow" by Olivia Newton-John.

In 2003, Brazilian singer Luiza Possi released a Portuguese version of the song under the title "Além do arco-íris (Over the Rainbow)", for the soundtrack of the Brazilian telenovela Chocolate com Pimenta. A cover of the original version was also recorded.

Ray Charles performed "Over The Rainbow" with Johnny Mathis on his 2004 album Genius Loves Company.

Zaachariaha Fielding, of Electric Fields fame, was selected by Baz Luhrmann to sing the song in the Yolngu language in his 2008 film Australia.

Nicholas David, a contestant on the third season of The Voice, recorded a version that went to number 96 on the Billboard Hot 100 in 2012 with sales of 48,000 copies.

American singer Ariana Grande released a version of the song on June 6, 2017, to raise money at her benefit concert One Love Manchester after 22 people were killed in the Manchester Arena bombing at Grande's concert on May 22, 2017. Her live performance at the benefit concert was televised two days prior, i.e. on June 4, 2017. The song was then added to the setlist of her Dangerous Woman Tour. The version peaked at number 60 on the UK Singles Chart on the week ending June 22, 2017. Grande would later perform the song in 2025 as part of a medley of songs from The Wizard of Oz, The Wiz and Wicked to open the 97th Academy Awards.

In 2017 to raise money for BBC Children in Need, 1,788 children sang the song in unison from 10 towns across the UK. The choirs performed simultaneously and throughout the song it would cut between the choirs giving each choir 10–20 seconds. This was all done live as they sang. The choirs sang from: Elstree at Elstree Studios the studio, just outside of London, where the main telethon was held, Manchester at The Science and Industry Museum, Bristol at Aerospace, Glasgow at BBC Pacific Quay, Newcastle at The Discovery Museum, Newbury at Brockhurst and Marlston House School, Belfast at The Ulster Folk and Transport Museum, Halifax at The Piece Hall, Cardiff at The Broadcasting House and Nottingham at The Albert Hall.

== See also ==
- Musical selections in The Wizard of Oz
- List of 1930s jazz standards
- List of best-selling singles
- List of best-selling singles in the United States
