= Somewhere (Eva Cassidy album) =

Studio album by Eva Cassidy
- Released: August 26, 2008
- Label: Blix Street
- Producers: Chris Biondo, Steve Lima (Track 4)

Eva Cassidy chronology
Wonderful World (2004)	Somewhere (2008)	Simply Eva (2011)

Professional ratings
Review scores
Source	Rating
Detroit Free Press	3/4 stars
New York Daily News	3/5 stars
The Trades	(favorable)
Salt Lake Tribune	(B)

Somewhere is the seventh posthumous studio album by American singer Eva Cassidy. It was released on 26 August 2008, twelve years after her death in 1996. For the first time, it includes two songs written by Cassidy herself, "Early One Morning" and "Somewhere".

== Track listing ==
No.	Title	Writer(s)	Original artist	Length
1.	"Coat of Many Colors"	Dolly Parton	Dolly Parton	3:17
2.	"My Love Is Like a Red Red Rose"	-	Traditional	3:43
3.	"Ain't Doin' Too Bad"	Don D. Robey	James Cotton	3:41
4.	"Chain of Fools"	Donald Covay	Aretha Franklin	4:10
5.	"Won't Be Long"	J. Leslie McFarland	Aretha Franklin	3:47
6.	"Walkin' After Midnight"	Don Hecht, Alan Block	Patsy Cline	2:38
7.	"Early One Morning"	Eva Cassidy, Rob Cooper	-	2:20
8.	"A Bold Young Farmer"	-	Traditional	3:44
9.	"If I Give My Heart"	John Pennell	Alison Krauss	3:59
10.	"Blue Eyes Crying in the Rain"	Fred Rose	Roy Acuff	2:50
11.	"Summertime"	George Gershwin, DuBose Heyward, Ira Gershwin	Billie Holiday	3:04
12.	"Somewhere"	Eva Cassidy, Chris Biondo	-	4:54

== Personnel ==
- Eva Cassidy – vocals, backup vocals, guitar
- Chris Biondo – bass guitar, acoustic guitar, synthesizers, percussion
- Keith Grimes – electric guitar
- Lenny Williams – piano, organ, synthesizers, orchestra
- Raice McLeod – drums, percussion
- Dan Cassidy – violin
- Blues Webb – drums, percussion
- William "JuJu" House – drums
- Chris Walker – trumpet
- Jen Krupa – trombone
- Leonie & Amba Tremain – backup vocals
- Steve Lima – guitar, bass guitar, drums, Hammond organ
- Rob Cooper – Dobro and electric lap steel guitar

== Charts ==
Charts	Peak position
Australian Albums (ARIA Charts)	78
UK Albums Chart	4
Swedish Albums Chart	12
Norwegian Albums Chart	11
Irish Albums Chart	15
U.S. Billboard Top 200	136

The album been certified Gold in the UK.
