= Eva by Heart =

Studio album by Eva Cassidy
- Released: September 23, 1997
- Length: 47:30
- Label: Blix Street
- Producer: Chris Biondo

Eva Cassidy chronology
Live at Blues Alley (1996)	Eva by Heart (1997)	Songbird (1998)

Eva by Heart is an album by American singer Eva Cassidy. It was released in 1997, a year after Cassidy's death.

== Production ==
Eva Cassidy was working on Eva by Heart, her first solo studio album, when she died of melanoma at the age of 33. The album was completed by her musical collaborator Chris Biondo. Some of the tracks had been finished at the time of Cassidy's death, while others were more incomplete. Biondo finished producing some of the songs by adding accompanying musicians in a way that he thought Cassidy would have wanted.

== Critical reception ==
Professional ratings
Review scores
Source	Rating
AllMusic	4.5/5 stars

On AllMusic, Jose F. Promis said, "Eva's voice always sounds crystalline, and her interpretive skills are unmatched... The woman had the power to transform a standard or a traditional into her own song, and she could belt out the blues just as good as anybody else..."

== Track listing ==
1. "I Know You by Heart" (Eve Nelson, Diane Scanlon) – 3:57
2. "Time Is a Healer" (Diane Scanlon, Greg Smith) – 4:14
3. "Wayfaring Stranger" (Traditional) – 4:26
4. "Wade in the Water" (Traditional) – 4:00
5. "Blues in the Night" (Harold Arlen, Johnny Mercer) – 4:05
6. "Songbird" (Christine McVie) – 3:41
7. "Need Your Love So Bad" (Little Willie John, Mertis John Jr.) – 4:36 (duet with Chuck Brown)
8. "Say Goodbye" (Steven Digman, Andrew Hernandez) – 3:55
9. "Nightbird" (Doug MacLeod) – 5:27
10. "Waly, Waly" (Traditional) – 4:45
11. "How Can I Keep from Singing?" (Traditional) – 4:24

Bonus track on the European version of the album:

12. "The Dark End of the Street" (Dan Penn, Chips Moman) – 3:52

== Personnel ==
=== Musicians ===
- Eva Cassidy – acoustic guitar, guitar, strings, cello, keyboards, vocals, background vocals, wah wah guitar
- Chris Biondo – acoustic guitar, bass
- Keith Grimes – electric guitar
- Raice McLeod – drums
- Chuck Brown – background vocals
- Mark Carson – piano, background vocals
- Dan Cassidy – violin
- Doug Elliot – trombone
- Anthony Flowers – organ
- John Gillespie – organ, background vocals
- Dan Haverstock – trombone
- William "JuJu" House – drums
- Larry Melton – bass
- Leigh Pilzer – baritone saxophone, tenor saxophone
- Mike Stein – violin
- Karen Van Sant – violin
- Chris Walker – trumpet
- Lenny Williams – organ, strings, keyboards
- Kent Wood – piano

=== Production ===
- Producer: Chris Biondo
- Engineers: Chris Biondo, Lenny Williams, Kent Wood
- Remastering: Robert Vosgien
- Arranger: Eva Cassidy
- Horn arrangements: Leigh Pilzer
- String arrangements: Lenny Williams
- Drum programming: Chris Biondo
- Liner notes: Joel Siegel
- Design: Eileen White

== Charts ==
Chart	Peak position
Swedish Albums Chart	53
UK Albums Chart	95
