= Fields of Gold =

1993 single by Sting

Single by Sting

from the album Ten Summoner's Tales
- Released: 7 June 1993
- Genre: Pop; soft rock
- Length: 3:42
- Label: A&M
- Songwriter: Sting
- Producers: Sting; Hugh Padgham

Sting singles chronology
"Seven Days" (1993)	"Fields of Gold" (1993)	"Shape of My Heart" (1993)

Music video
- "Fields of Gold" on YouTube

"Fields of Gold" is a song written and performed by the English musician Sting. It first appeared on his fourth studio album, Ten Summoner's Tales (1993). The song, co-produced by Sting with Hugh Padgham, was released as a single on 7 June 1993 by A&M Records. Sting was inspired to write the song by the sights he could see from his Wiltshire manor house, which was surrounded by fields of barley.

It was moderately commercially successful, reaching number 16 on the UK Singles Chart and number 23 on the US Billboard Hot 100. It was more successful elsewhere, reaching number 2 in Canada and number 6 in Iceland. It received certifications in Denmark, Italy and Spain among other countries. In 1994, it was awarded one of BMI's Pop Songs Awards. The song received positive reviews from music critics who praised its balladry and Sting's vocals, predicting it would be successful with his listeners.

The accompanying music video for the song was directed by Kevin Godley and was released on the same day as the song. It features Sting singing the song as a gold silhouette walking in a dark village. It features references to common British objects such as a red telephone box. To promote the song, Sting included it on the set list of his concert tours and performed it live during televised appearances. The song was covered by several artists, most notably Eva Cassidy whose version was certified gold by the British Phonographic Industry (BPI). It was also covered by artist Katie Melua, American singer Michael Bolton, Italian artist Zucchero, English recording artist Ellie Goulding and Jamaican reggae band Third World.

== Background ==
"Fields of Gold" and all the other tracks on Sting's fourth studio album Ten Summoner's Tales (1993) were recorded at Lake House in Wiltshire, mixed at The Townhouse Studio, London, England and mastered at Masterdisk, New York City. The harmonica solo is played by Brendan Power, and the Northumbrian smallpipes are played by Kathryn Tickell at the end of verses one and three.

Sting had presented a demo of "Fields of Gold" to David Sancious, Vinnie Colaiuta, and Dominic Miller, who would later serve as the session musicians for the studio recording. Sancious recalled that the basic track was "a live, in-the-studio recording - there's actually no overdubs on it". At the suggestion of Sting, Sancious played a soft synthesizer pad throughout the song. Hugh Padgham, who co-produced the song, recalled that he placed particular attention on refining the guitar part, saying his goal was to make the arrangement "simple". He provided guidance on the chord voicings, suggested which guitar strings to use, and emptied out the arrangement by discarding guitar tracks that he deemed unnecessary. The cover of the single was photographed by Kevin Westenberg.

== Composition ==
"Fields of Gold" is a slow-paced pop ballad. It lyrically discusses the male protagonist's love relationship with his female love interest as it opens with his pondering of whether his love will be requited, as sung in the lines “Will you be my love?”. He then proceeds to discuss the other stages of the relationship, including marriage, children, and passing away, thus portraying a "journey of commitment". Emma Harrison, writing for uDiscover Music summarized the song's topic, writing "It's not so hard to believe that this track is indeed a metaphor for love itself; how love can be powerful and also simple, but only when it's with the right person." In Lyrics By Sting, the singer described the view from his 16th-century Wiltshire manor house, which served as the main inspiration behind writing "Fields of Gold":

In England, our house is surrounded by barley fields, and in the summer it's fascinating to watch the wind moving over the shimmering surface, like waves on an ocean of gold. There's something inherently sexy about the sight, something primal, as if the wind were making love to the barley. Lovers have made promises here, I'm sure, their bonds strengthened by the comforting cycle of the seasons.

== Release and chart performance ==
"Fields of Gold" was the second single released from the album after "If I Ever Lose My Faith in You" in North America and the third single in some European countries and Australia after "Seven Days". It was released on 7 June 1993 in both Australia and the UK. "Fields of Gold" was awarded one of BMI's Pop Songs Awards in 1994, honoring the songwriters, composers and music publishers of the song.

Upon its release, the song achieved moderate success in the English-speaking world. It peaked at number 23 on the US Billboard Hot 100. It achieved higher success on the US Billboard Adult Contemporary chart, peaking at a position of number two. The single reached number 16 on the UK Singles Chart for the chart issue dated 19 June 1993. It also reached a position of number 2 on the Canadian RPM Top Singles chart. In Ireland, the song peaked at number 22 on 24 June 1993 and it spent a total of two weeks on the Irish Singles Chart. In New Zealand, the song debuted at a position of number 41 on 29 August 1993 before moving to its peak position of 34 in the following week. It spent a total of two weeks on the chart and was later certified platinum for selling over 30,000 copies. Similarly, it peaked at number 85 on the ARIA Charts.

Elsewhere, it was also successful in charts across Europe. In the generic European charts, it managed to peak at number 38 on the European Hot 100 Singles and number nine on the European Hit Radio chart. In Germany, it debuted at number 52 on 26 July 1993 which also became its peak position. It was certified gold in Germany by the Bundesverband Musikindustrie, denoting sales of over 250,000 copies. It also appeared on the charts in Iceland, the Netherlands and Switzerland. It attained the highest position in the first country, where it peaked at number six on the chart issue dated 24 June 1993 in its third week on the chart. In the Netherlands, "Fields of Gold" debuted at a position of number 48 on 14 August 1993. It later peaked at number 44 in its third week on the chart on 28 August 1993. It fell off the chart two weeks later, only to return at a position of 76 on the chart issue dated 21 September 2013. In Switzerland, "Fields of Gold" peaked at a position of 25 in its last week on the chart dated 5 September 1993, having spent a total of four weeks on it.

The single was also commercially successful in Denmark, Italy and Spain. In the former country, it received a platinum certification for sales over 90,000 copies by the IFPI Danmark. In Italy, it received a gold certification for sales of over 25,000 since 2009 by Federazione Industria Musicale Italiana (FIMI). In Spain, the single sold over 30,000 copies and was certified gold by the Productores de Música de España.

The song was included in Sting's first compilations album issued under the title Fields of Gold: The Best of Sting 1984–1994 and released in 1994 and in a later compilation The Very Best of Sting & The Police in 1997. It was re-recorded by Sting in 2006 as a bonus track for his classical album Songs from the Labyrinth, in which the song was accompanied entirely by a lute.

== Critical reception ==
In a retrospective review of Ten Summoner's Tales, Stephen Thomas Erlewine from AllMusic called "Fields of Gold" a "peaceful ballad", and said that it ranks as a classic. Larry Flick from Billboard magazine described it as a "deeply alluring ballad with atmosphere to burn." He added, "Impeccably produced, it features a strong seductive vocal (and nice harmonica strains) from Sting, as well as lovely harplike acoustic guitar figures from band mate Dominic Miller. Among the most distinctive and beguiling songs the man has written, it's sure to earn a powerful multiformat reception, and thereby steal a few million hearts." Irish Bray People viewed it as "moody but ultimately likeable". David Bowling from the Daily Vault named it one of the "brilliant pop songs of the 1990s." He stated that it remains "the perfect ballad. It is a wistful love song looking back on love gained."

In his weekly UK chart commentary, James Masterton wrote, "For a man who is normally considered an albums artist this is an achievement indeed, a third hit in a row from his latest album, and all of them Top 20 hits." Alan Jones from Music Week gave "Fields of Gold" a score of four out of five and named it Pick of the Week, calling it a "lilting, haunting, soothing, almost folky song". He added that "the uncluttered arrangement and intimate vocals are excellent". In a 2015 review, Pop Rescue commented, "This song is so wonderfully mellow, and flows so perfectly, that it’s near impossible to find fault with it." Andrew Collins from Select felt the album was at its best with songs like "Fields of Gold", saying it was "massaging the menopause". In an interview at the Liverpool Institute for Performing Arts, Paul McCartney stated that "Fields of Gold" was a song he wished he'd written himself.

Emma Harrison, writing for uDiscover Music described the song as "elegant and powerful, while – at the same time – effortlessly simple". "Fields of Gold" is one of Sting's most famous songs despite its moderate chart success. It was ranked at number two on his best songs list compiled by Smooth radio in the UK in 2024.

== Music video ==
The music video for "Fields of Gold" was directed by British singer, songwriter, musician and music video director Kevin Godley and released on 7 June 1993. It was entirely shot in a studio over one week and produced by Iain Brown for Medialab. The video features a gold silhouette of Sting singing the song while walking through a dark village at night containing common features seen throughout the UK such as a red telephone box and a red pillar box. Scenes also feature Sting singing the song while bathed in blue and gold light. The silhouette of Sting is shown as such that the background inside him exactly matches the background of the surrounding village, only the version inside of him is bright and bustling with people, while the version outside is dark and dead. The video ends with the camera going into the silhouette and Sting's clothing disappearing, showing a final shot of the village at daylight and with various people. It was later made available on YouTube in 2011 and had generated more than 100 million views as of November 2023.

== Live performances ==
"Fields of Gold" was part of Sting's set list during his On Stage Together Tour (2014–15). A live performance of Sting playing the song at Lake House, Wiltshire, England in 1993 was posted on his YouTube channel on 2 June 2023. Sting performed "Fields of Gold" live on 24 May 2019 at Le Grand Studio RTL in France. In March 2026, Sting performed the song as part of a live concert titled "Sounds like Art" he gave at the Rijksmuseum in Amsterdam. The song was included on the set list of his Sting 3.0 tour in 2026.

== Cover versions ==
=== Eva Cassidy version ===
"Fields of Gold"

Single by Eva Cassidy

from the album Songbird
- Released: 1998
- Length: 4:46
- Label: Blix Street
- Songwriter: Sting
- Producer: Chris Biondo

Eva Cassidy singles chronology
"You Take My Breath Away" (2003)	"Fields of Gold" (1998)	"What a Wonderful World" (2007)

American singer and guitarist Eva Cassidy recorded a version that first appeared on her 1996 live album Live at Blues Alley, then later on her albums Songbird (1998) and The Best of Eva Cassidy (2012). Cassidy's version charted in Sweden and the Netherlands in 2008 and 2013, respectively. On the Swedish singles chart, it appeared at number 51 on 18 June 2008, before moving to a peak position of 47 in the following week. In the Netherlands, it appeared at the position of 66 on the chart issue dated 21 September 2013. Her version was also certified gold by the BPI on 26 May 2022.

A writer at PopDose was positive about the cover, saying that Cassidy gave it a "delicate treatment and takes an already fine song and gives it a new emotional depth". AllMusic writer Scott Taylor described her version of "Fields of Gold" as a "radio-friendly pop cover". Greg Kot from Rolling Stone felt that "Fields of Gold" was one of the album's two songs where "she melts her personality into the fabric of the melody". Chuck Taylor from Billboard magazine was also positive of her rendition, calling it "truly a joyful moment, a recording that will pull listeners close to the speakers, where they will accomplish that rare feat of not only hearing but also listening".

In 2011, American singer-songwriter Michael Bolton covered the song for his album Gems: The Duets Collection, adding several lines to the already existing Cassidy cover. In a review for Entertainment Weekly, the song was called one of the album's "covers of sure-thing hits". British-Georgian singer Katie Melua, a fan of Cassidy, recorded a version that was released as the BBC Children in Need single for 2017. Her version of the song peaked at number 29 on the UK Singles Chart on 30 November 2017. It fared better on the Scottish singles chart, where it peaked at a position of number six on the same date as in the UK.

=== Ellie Goulding version ===
"Fields of Gold"

Promotional single by Ellie Goulding

from the album Songbook for Christmas
- Released: 2 November 2022
- Length: 3:45
- Label: Polydor
- Songwriter: Sting
- Producer: Max Cooke

Ellie Goulding promotional singles chronology
"Lost and Found" (2015)	"Fields of Gold" (2022)	"Cure for Love" (2023)

Music video
- "Fields of Gold" on YouTube

On 14 March 2016, the English singer Ellie Goulding performed an acoustic rendition of the song for the royal family at Westminster Abbey, London. She later released another stripped-down version of the song on 2 November 2022, sharing: "'Fields of Gold' is a song that is close to my heart – I've been lucky enough to cover a few greats over the years – this one not only holds memories of my childhood but also highlights in my career." A live performance of her cover version was posted on 20 December 2022, on ITV 1.

=== Other versions ===
In 2009, Irish band Celtic Woman covered "Fields of Gold" and performed it live as part of their world tours, including the one taking place in 2015. On 7 April 2016, Sting performed a live version of the song in Olympia, Paris together with Israeli singer Achinoam Nini. On 4 August 2020, Sting accompanied Italian artist Zucchero on guitar while he sang an Italian language version of the song shared on social media. On 23 September 2022, a cover version of the song by guitarists Tommy Emmanuel and Mike Dawes was recorded for their extended play Accomplice Series Vol. 3 and was shared online. On 20 October 2023, American artist P!nk released "Dreaming" an electronic dance music (EDM) re-work of "Fields of Gold" featuring Sting and Marshmello. Jamaican reggae band Third World released a cover of "Fields of Gold" as a single on 31 January 2025. Their version of the song was produced by Clive Hunt and it was a part of a joint project with Iconic Azul Music and Ineffable Records. A cover version of "Fields of Gold" by Music Lab Collective was used in an episode of the fourth season of the Netflix show Bridgerton.

== Track listings ==
- UK 4-track CD single
1. "Fields of Gold"
2. "King of Pain" (live)
3. "Fragile" (live)
4. "Purple Haze" (live)
- UK limited edition 4-track gatefold CD single
1. "Fields of Gold"
2. "Message in a Bottle" (live)
3. "Fortress Around Your Heart" (live)
4. "Roxanne" (live)

== Charts ==
=== Weekly charts ===
Sting version

Chart (1993)	Peak position
Australia (ARIA)	85
Canada Top Singles (RPM)	2
Canada Adult Contemporary (RPM)	2
Europe (Eurochart Hot 100)	38
Europe (European Hit Radio)	9
Germany (GfK)	52
Iceland (Íslenski Listinn Topp 40)	6
Ireland (IRMA)	22
Israel (Israeli Singles Chart)	9
Netherlands (Single Top 100)	44
New Zealand (Recorded Music NZ)	34
Switzerland (Schweizer Hitparade)	25
UK Singles (Official Charts)	16
UK Airplay (Music Week)	9
US Billboard Hot 100	23
US Adult Contemporary (Billboard)	2
US Alternative Airplay (Billboard)	12
US Mainstream Rock (Billboard)	24
US Pop Airplay (Billboard)	24
US Cash Box Top 100	16

Eva Cassidy version

Chart (2008–2013)	Peak position
Netherlands (Single Top 100)	66
Sweden (Sverigetopplistan)	47

Katie Melua version

Chart (2017)	Peak position
Scottish Singles Sales (Official Charts)	6
UK Singles (Official Charts)	29

=== Year-end charts ===
Sting version

Chart (1993)	Position
Canada Top Singles (RPM)	13
Canada Adult Contemporary (RPM)	41
Iceland (Íslenski Listinn Topp 40)	80
US Billboard Hot 100	87
US Adult Contemporary (Billboard)	7

Chart (1994)	Position
US Adult Contemporary (Billboard)	46

== Certifications ==
Region	Certification	Certified units/sales
Denmark (IFPI Danmark)	Platinum	90,000^{‡}
Germany (BVMI)	Gold	250,000^{‡}
Italy (FIMI) sales since 2009	Gold	25,000^{‡}
New Zealand (RMNZ)	Platinum	30,000^{‡}
Spain (Promusicae)	Gold	30,000^{‡}
United Kingdom (BPI) sales since 2005, Cassidy version	Gold	400,000^{‡}
^{‡} Sales+streaming figures based on certification alone.

== Release history ==
Region	Date	Format(s)	Label(s)	Ref.
Australia	7 June 1993	CD; cassette	A&M	
United Kingdom	7 June 1993	7-inch vinyl; CD; cassette	A&M	
Japan	10 June 1993	Mini-CD	A&M	
