= The Other Side (Chuck Brown and Eva Cassidy album) =

Studio album by Chuck Brown and Eva Cassidy
- Released: 1992
- Recorded: 1992, Glenn Dale, Maryland
- Genre: Soul, jazz, blues
- Length: 54:25
- Label: Liaison
- Producer: Chris Biondo

Chuck Brown chronology
90's Goin' Hard (1991)	The Other Side (1992)	This Is a Journey into Time (1993)

Eva Cassidy chronology
The Other Side (1992)	Live at Blues Alley (1996)

Professional ratings
Review scores
Source	Rating
AllMusic	2.5/5 stars
The Great Rock Discography	5/10
MusicHound R&B: The Essential Album Guide	3.5/5 stars

The Other Side is an album by the American musicians Chuck Brown and Eva Cassidy, released in 1992 by Liaison Records. It was produced by Chris Biondo, who was impressed with Cassidy's version of "God Bless the Child". The album contains jazz, blues and soul standards and a mixture of solos and duets. It is the only studio album by Cassidy to have been released in her lifetime.

== Track listing ==
1. "Let the Good Times Roll" (Shirley Goodman, Leonard Lee) - 3:12
2. "Fever" (Eddie Cooley, John Davenport) - 4:16
3. "You Don't Know Me" (Eddy Arnold, Cindy Walker) - 4:59
4. "I Could Have Told You So" (Jimmy Van Heusen, Carl Sigman) - 3:31
5. "Gee, Baby, Ain't I Good to You" (Andy Razaf, Don Redman) - 2:44
6. "I'll Go Crazy" (James Brown) - 2:50
7. "You Don't Know What Love Is" (Gene de Paul, Don Raye) - 4:40 (Chuck Brown solo)
8. "Drown in My Own Tears" (Henry Glover) - 5:37
9. "God Bless the Child" (Billie Holiday, Arthur Herzog, Jr.) - 3:18 (Eva Cassidy solo)
10. "Red Top" (Ben Kynard, Lionel Hampton) - 2:55
11. "Dark End of the Street" (Dan Penn, Chips Moman) - 3:55 (Eva Cassidy solo)
12. "The Shadow of Your Smile" (Johnny Mandel, Paul Francis Webster) - 3:30
13. "Over the Rainbow" (Harold Arlen, E.Y. Harburg) - 5:02 (Eva Cassidy solo)
14. "You've Changed" (Bill Carey, Carl Fischer) - 4:00

== Personnel ==
- Chuck Brown - vocals, piano
- Eva Cassidy - vocals, guitar
- Keith Grimes - guitar
- Dave Lourim - guitar
- Dan Cassidy - violin
- Matthew Allen - strings
- Philip Jehle - clarinet
- Tom Crawford - saxophone
- Donnell Floyd - saxophone
- C.J. - saxophone
- Gilbert Pryor - trumpet
- The Reverend Pope - trumpet
- "Little" Benny Harley - trumpet
- Roy Battle - trombone
- Lenny Williams - piano, vibes
- Mark "Godfather" Lawson - organ
- Kent Wood - organ, synthesizer
- Chris Biondo - bass, congas
- Keter Betts - upright bass
- Raice McLeod - drums
- Jim Campbell - drums
- Ju Ju House - drums
- William Cook - congas
- Darryl Andrews - percussion
