= Live at Blues Alley (Eva Cassidy album) =

Live album by Eva Cassidy
- Released: May 1996
- Recorded: January 3, 1996
- Venue: Blues Alley, Georgetown, Washington, D.C.
- Genre: Blues, jazz, folk
- Length: 57:21
- Label: Eva Music
- Producer: Eva Cassidy; Chris Biondo

Eva Cassidy chronology
The Other Side (1992)	Live at Blues Alley (1996)	Eva by Heart (1997)

Live at Blues Alley is an album by American singer Eva Cassidy, originally self-released in May 1996. The album was recorded live at the Blues Alley nightclub in January 1996. It was the last album recorded by Cassidy before her death in November 1996.

== Recording details ==
Unable to interest a major label in recording her music, Cassidy cashed in a small pension she had accumulated while working at her day job in a plant nursery to self-fund this recording of herself and her live band, comprising Lenny Williams (piano), Keith Grimes (guitar), Chris Biondo (bass) and Raice McLeod (drums), with Cassidy herself supplying vocals and acoustic guitar. The Blues Alley venue was booked for two nights, January 2 and 3, 1996, however on the first night technical issues prevented the tapes being any use so all of the recorded material used originates from the second, Wednesday night's performance. Cassidy was suffering from a light cold through both shows and initially felt that the performances were not good enough to release, but eventually agreed after a previously completed studio take of "Oh, Had I a Golden Thread" was added to round out the package.

This was Cassidy's last release in her lifetime, but the beginning of her posthumous rise to fame. She died of melanoma six months after it was released, ten months after it was recorded.

Video recordings of a number of the same performances, virtually the sum of her recorded video legacy, were later released on DVD as Eva Cassidy Sings, and again (with slightly different track selection) on the DVD portion of the 2-CD + 1-DVD 2015 compilation Nightbird, of which the audio CDs include remixed versions of the songs from Live at Blues Alley as well as 19 additional tracks from the same concert, a subset of which had previously also been included on other posthumous Cassidy releases.

== Music ==
Live at Blues Alley serves as an example of Cassidy's eclectic tastes, covering classic and contemporary artists from Billie Holiday to Sting, including Al Green, Pete Seeger, Irving Berlin and more. Her cover of "Fields of Gold" was a popular radio song and record companies used it to promote her material; in 2001 Michelle Kwan skated to the music of Eva's version of this song. "What a Wonderful World", the last song she ever performed live, retains one of the introductions that was not edited out, in which she dedicates the song to her parents. "Golden Thread", by Pete Seeger, was declared by Eva to be her favorite song in the album's liner notes and the song she felt had turned out the best on the album. It was not actually performed at Blues Alley but was recorded months earlier.

== Reception ==
Professional ratings
Review scores
Source	Rating
AllMusic	4.5/5 stars

The album inspired attention from audiences outside of her local following in Washington D.C. Before and during the album's recording, Cassidy suffered many physical health problems, whose causes, at the time, were unknown. Three months after the album was released, she was diagnosed with terminal cancer. Unfortunately, she died three months later without experiencing her burgeoning musical career. "Her posthumous success," writes William Cooper, "has been astonishing, with worldwide critical acclaim and extensive exposure on British television that helped her album Songbird climb to number one on the British album chart in March, 2001."

== Track listing ==
1. "Cheek to Cheek" (Irving Berlin) – 4:03
2. "Stormy Monday" (T-Bone Walker) – 5:49
3. "Bridge over Troubled Water" (Paul Simon) – 5:33
4. "Fine and Mellow" (Billie Holiday) – 4:03
5. "People Get Ready" (Curtis Mayfield) – 3:36
6. "Blue Skies" (Irving Berlin) – 2:37
7. "Tall Trees in Georgia" (Buffy St. Marie) – 4:05
8. "Fields of Gold" (Sting) – 4:57
9. "Autumn Leaves" (Joseph Kosma, Johnny Mercer, Jacques Prévert) – 4:57
10. "Honeysuckle Rose" (Andy Razaf, Thomas "Fats" Waller) – 3:14
11. "Take Me to the River" (Al Green, Mabon "Teenie" Hodges) – 3:51
12. "What a Wonderful World" (Bob Thiele, George David Weiss) – 5:50
13. "Oh, Had I a Golden Thread" (Pete Seeger) – 4:46 [Studio recording]

== Charts ==
Chart (2001–2004)	Peak position
Danish Albums Chart	29
Swedish Albums Chart	19
UK Albums Chart	86

== Personnel ==
- Eva Cassidy – vocals, acoustic guitar, electric guitar
- Chris Biondo – bass
- Hilton Felton – Hammond organ
- Keith Grimes – electric guitar
- Raice McLeod – drums
- Lenny Williams – piano

== Production ==
- Producers: Eva Cassidy, Chris Biondo
- Engineer: Roy Battle
- Mastering: Robert Vosgien
- Photography: Larry Melton
- Artwork: Jeff Muller
