= Blix Street Records =

American and Celtic music

- Country of origin: United States
- Location: Gig Harbor, Washington
- Official website: www.Blixstreet.com

Blix Street Records is a United States–based record label located in Gig Harbor, Washington, overseen by president Bill Straw. Blix Street features a diverse group of instrumental, vocal, and Celtic albums. Among the more famous artists who have recorded with Blix Street Records are Eva Cassidy, Mary Black, Grace Griffith, Daniel Rodriguez, Dougie Maclean, Davy Knowles, Back Door Slam, and songwriter Randy Sharp.
