= Eva Cassidy =

American jazz and blues singer (1963–1996)

- Cassidy in 1988

Background information
- Born: Eva Marie Cassidy; February 2, 1963; Washington, D.C., U.S.
- Died: November 2, 1996 (aged 33) Bowie, Maryland, U.S.
- Cause of death: Melanoma
- Genres: Jazz; folk; blues
- Occupations: Singer; musician
- Instruments: Vocals; guitar; piano
- Years active: 1981–1996
- Labels: Liaison; Blix Street Records; BLP

Eva Marie Cassidy (February 2, 1963 – November 2, 1996) was an American singer and musician. She was known for her interpretations of jazz, folk, and blues music, sung with a powerful, emotive soprano voice. In 1992 she released her first album, The Other Side, a set of duets with go-go musician Chuck Brown, followed by a 1996 live solo album titled Live at Blues Alley. Although she had been honored by the Washington Area Music Association, she was virtually unknown outside her native Washington, D.C. area at the time of her death from melanoma at the age of 33 in 1996.

Two years after Cassidy's death, Mike Harding and Terry Wogan played her versions of "Fields of Gold" and "Over the Rainbow" on BBC Radio 2, bringing her music to the attention of British audiences. Following an overwhelming response, a camcorder recording of "Over the Rainbow", taken at Blues Alley in Washington, D.C. by her friend Bryan McCulley, was shown on BBC Two's Top of the Pops 2. Shortly afterwards a compilation album, Songbird, climbed to the top of the UK Albums Chart, almost three years after its release. Chart success in the United Kingdom and Ireland led to increased recognition of Cassidy worldwide and her posthumously released recordings, including three number-one albums and one number-one single in the UK, have sold more than ten million copies. She has charted in the top 10 in Australia, Germany, Norway, Sweden and Switzerland.

Nine posthumous albums of her music have been released. The most recent, I Can Only Be Me, a collaboration with the London Symphony Orchestra, was released in 2023 and charted at number 9 on the UK album chart.

== Early life ==
Cassidy was born on February 2, 1963, at the Washington Hospital Center in Washington, D.C., and grew up in Oxon Hill, Maryland, and later Bowie, Maryland. She was the third of four children of Hugh Cassidy, a teacher, sculptor, musician, former army medic and world champion powerlifter of Irish and Scottish descent, and Barbara (née Kratzer), a German horticulturist from Bad Kreuznach. From an early age Cassidy displayed an interest in art and music. When she was nine, her father began teaching her to play the guitar and she played and sang at family gatherings.

At age 11, Cassidy began singing and playing guitar in a Washington-area band called Easy Street. The band performed in a variety of styles at weddings, corporate parties and pubs, although she was shy and struggled with performing in front of strangers. While a student at Bowie High School she sang with a local band called Stonehenge. During the summer of 1983, Cassidy sang and played guitar six days a week at the theme park Wild World. Her younger brother Dan, a fiddler, was also a member of this working band. She enrolled in art classes at Prince George's Community College, but dropped out.

Throughout the 1980s Cassidy worked with several other bands, including the techno-pop band Characters Without Names. During this period she also worked as a propagator at a plant nursery and as a furniture painter. In her free time she explored other artistic expressions, including painting, sculpting, and jewelry design.

== Music career ==
In 1986, Cassidy was asked by Stonehenge guitarist and high school friend David Lourim to lend her voice to his music project, Method Actor. This brought her to Black Pond Studios, where she met recording engineer and bassist Chris Biondo. Biondo helped her to find work as a session singer and introduced her to Al Dale, who became her manager. She sang back-ups for various acts, from go-go rhythm and blues band Experience Unlimited to rapper E-40. In 1990 Biondo and Cassidy, who were in a romantic relationship for a time, formed a five-piece group, the Eva Cassidy Band, with Lenny Williams, Keith Grimes and Raice McLeod, and began to perform frequently in the Washington, D.C. area.

"Stormy Monday"
Cassidy's arrangement of T-Bone Walker's popular blues song.

In 1992, Biondo played a tape of Cassidy's voice for Chuck Brown, the "Godfather of go-go". This resulted in a duet album, The Other Side, featuring performances of classic songs such as "Fever", "God Bless the Child" and what would later become Cassidy's signature song, "Over the Rainbow". The album was released and distributed in 1992 by Liaison Records, the label that also released Brown's go-go albums. Brown originally intended to record a duet with Cassidy for his next solo album, but this was postponed while Dale negotiated with other labels for a solo deal, and Cassidy was unwilling to narrow her stylistic focus to one genre, which would have hindered her chances of securing a deal. After talks broke down, the two recorded their own duet album and performed as a duo at the Columbia Arts Festival, opening for acts like Al Green and The Neville Brothers.

"She was an angel, very humble and shy. She would listen more than talk ... I remember lots of times, we were playing and it was just empty and dead. She seemed to like those nights, because there wasn't as much pressure. In fact, she'd be more relieved when hardly anybody was out there."

— Cassidy's bandmate Biondo on her anxiety in front of crowds.

In 1993, Cassidy was honored by the Washington Area Music Association with a Wammie award in the Vocalist Jazz/Traditional category. The following year she was invited to perform at the event and sang "Over the Rainbow". The Washington Times review of the event called her performance "a show-stopper". She took home two Wammies that night, again for Vocalist Jazz/Traditional and also for Roots Rock/Traditional R&B. For a brief period that year, Cassidy signed a deal with Blue Note Records to pair with pop-jazz band Pieces of a Dream to release an album and tour. She sang two tracks on a mainly instrumental album but found it a musically unsatisfying experience.

After a possible contract with Apollo Records collapsed when the label went bankrupt, Biondo and Dale decided that Cassidy should release her own live album. On January 2–3, 1996, the material for Live at Blues Alley was recorded at Blues Alley in Washington, D.C., but a technical glitch on the first night of recording meant that only the second night's recording was usable, with 12 songs from it released on the resulting album. (The complete set of 31 songs recorded that night was eventually released 20 years later in 2015 as Nightbird.) She was unhappy with the way she sounded and was reluctant to release the album, but eventually relented on the condition that the studio track "Oh, Had I a Golden Thread", Cassidy's favorite song, be included in the release, and that they would start working on a follow-up studio album. Her apprehension appeared to have been unfounded; local reviewers and the public responded positively. The Washington Post commented that "she could sing anything, folk, blues, pop, jazz, R&B, gospel, and make it sound like it was the only music that mattered." The next studio album she worked on was released posthumously as Eva by Heart in 1997. In the liner notes of Eva by Heart, music critic Joel E. Siegel described Cassidy as "one of the greatest voices of her generation."

Cassidy was the first artist to record and release the song "It's Not The Presents Under The Tree (It's Your Presence Right Here Next To Me)," which was written by Billy Poore and Tex Rabinowitz with the intent of having it recorded by Linda Ronstadt, who rejected it. Cassidy's version of the song appears on the 2002 version of The Time-Life Treasury Of Christmas.

== Personal life ==
Cassidy had a relationship with Chris Biondo, with whom she lived from 1991, but this ended before her cancer diagnosis.

== Illness and death ==
In 1993, Cassidy had a malignant mole removed from her back. Three years later, during a promotional event for the Live at Blues Alley album in July 1996, Cassidy noticed an ache in her hips, which she attributed to stiffness from painting murals while perched on a stepladder. The pain persisted and X-rays revealed a fracture. Further tests found that the cancer had spread (metastasized) to her bones, causing the fracture, and to her lungs. Her doctors estimated she had three to five months to live. Cassidy opted for aggressive treatment, but her health deteriorated rapidly.

On September 17, 1996, at a benefit concert for her at The Bayou, she made her final public appearance, closing the set with "What a Wonderful World" in front of an audience of family, friends, and fans. Additional chemotherapy was ineffective, and Cassidy died of melanoma on November 2, 1996, at her family's home in Bowie, Maryland. In accordance with her wishes, her body was cremated and the ashes were scattered on the lake shores of St. Mary's River Watershed Park, a nature reserve near Callaway, Maryland.

== Posthumous recognition ==
The camcorder recording of "Over the Rainbow" as shown on Top of the Pops 2

After Cassidy's death, local folk singer Grace Griffith introduced the Blues Alley recording to Bill Straw from her label, Blix Street Records. Straw approached the Cassidy family to put together a new album. In 1998, a compilation of tracks from Cassidy's three released recordings was assembled into the CD Songbird. This CD lingered in relative obscurity for two years until being given airplay by BBC Radio 2, firstly by Paul Jones then by Mike Harding but most famously by Terry Wogan on his wide-reaching show Wake Up to Wogan, following recommendation by his producer Paul Walters. The album sold more than 100,000 copies in the following months. The New York Times spoke of her "silken soprano voice with a wide and seemingly effortless range, unerring pitch and a gift for phrasing that at times was heart-stoppingly eloquent."

Before Christmas of 2000, BBC's Top of the Pops 2 aired a video of Cassidy performing "Over the Rainbow", which resulted in Songbird climbing steadily up the UK charts over the next few weeks. ITV's Tonight with Trevor McDonald aired a feature on Cassidy just as the album topped the chart. Shot at Blues Alley by a friend with a camcorder the same night the album was recorded, the video became the most requested video ever shown on Top Of The Pops 2. Alexis Petridis in The Guardian wrote, "There's an undeniable emotional appeal in hearing an artist who you know died in obscurity singing a song about hope and a mystical world beyond everyday life".

Paul McCartney and Eric Clapton were among her newfound fans. Jazz critic Ted Gioia writes, "You might be tempted to write off the 'Cassidy sensation' ... as a response to the sad story of the singer's abbreviated life rather than as a measure of her artistry. But don't be mistaken, Cassidy was a huge talent, whose obscurity during her lifetime was almost as much a tragedy as her early death." Songbird has since achieved significant chart success in Europe. It is certified six times platinum in the UK with 1,840,000 copies sold. Although relatively unknown in the US at first, the album was eventually certified gold.

"There is something about her voice – a quality – that you really can't put into words. It's a magical quality."

— Sting on Cassidy (who had recorded a version of his song "Fields of Gold" in 1996, the year she died).

In May 2001, ABC's Nightline in the US broadcast a short documentary about Cassidy, a labor of love from Nightline correspondent Dave Marash who was a fan of her music. That weekend all five of Cassidy's albums occupied Amazon.com's best sellers list top spots. The Nightline episode was rebroadcast three times and producer Leroy Sievers has said that it was "probably the most popular Nightline ever". In December 2000, a nine-minute segment on NPR resulted in a similar sales surge, with five of the top seven spots going to Cassidy. In Britain a rebroadcast of Tonight with Trevor McDonald increased sales.

Since Songbird, several other CDs with original material have been released: Time After Time (2000), Imagine (2002) and American Tune (2003). Cassidy's cover of Time After Time was featured on the 2003 soundtrack CD of the popular superhero television series Smallville. Word of mouth and internet fan sites have played a large role in Cassidy's success. In 2005 Amazon.com released a list of its top 25 best-selling musicians, with Cassidy in fifth position behind the Beatles, U2, Norah Jones and Diana Krall.

In 2008 another new album, Somewhere, was released. Unlike previous albums which had contained only cover songs, this release included two original songs co-written by Cassidy. An acoustic album, Simply Eva, was released in January 2011. In March 2023, the album I Can Only Be Me was released, which featured new orchestrations by the London Symphony Orchestra. The album debuted at number 9 on the UK Official Albums Chart. In an interview with The Independent, Cassidy's former bandmate and arranger Chris Biondo said, "Eva had a fantasy of one day having a full orchestra back her up [...] to her, that was the greatest place you could be musically." Audio restoration technology developed by filmmaker Peter Jackson was used to lift Cassidy's voice from her original recordings and the orchestrations were produced in 2021.

== Unofficial releases ==
The re-released Method Actor album cover showing Cassidy's prominent name placement, which resulted in a lawsuit. The original LP cover artwork was done by Cassidy herself.

A collection of previously unreleased studio recordings from 1987 to 1991 was released in 2000 as No Boundaries. This release was not endorsed by the Cassidy family and was released on a different label. An AllMusic review of the album stated that even "a gifted vocalist like Eva Cassidy can only do so much with bad material".

In 2002, the eponymous 1988 album by the band Method Actor, which featured Cassidy, was re-released by the band's guitarist and producer David Lourim, with Cassidy's name displayed prominently on the cover. The Cassidy family and Blix Street Records filed a lawsuit against Lourim, claiming that Cassidy's name was used in a misleading fashion and that Blix Street had exclusive rights to her recordings. Lourim had Cassidy's written permission to release the album, and eventually the cover was changed to look like the original LP album, while already released copies had a sticker affixed to indicate that they were not solo Eva Cassidy albums.

A bootleg recording was in circulation called Live at Pearl's. It was recorded at Pearl's Restaurant in Annapolis, Maryland, in 1994 and copies of the recording were circulated among friends and family after her death. Some of the songs on the recording were also on Imagine and American Tune. Another recording from the early '90s, featuring Mick Fleetwood on drums and recorded at his restaurant Fleetwood's in Alexandria, Virginia, was in the possession of writer/musician Niki Lee, the former wife of pianist Lenny Williams, 1988–1996. Lee discovered it in her garage and attempted to sell it on eBay in 2008 for £250,000 (around US$491,249 at that time; ~$659,650 in 2022 terms). She said she had converted the dollars to pounds incorrectly, and was criticised by Cassidy fans for her mistake. Lee sold the recording to a private buyer as the copyright holder, Blix Street Records, refused to release recordings owned by Cassidy's friends. This was still the case as of 2024. Blix Street threatened lawsuits to anyone who tried to release previously unreleased tracks.

To mark the 20th anniversary of the Blues Alley concert, Blix Street Records released Nightbird, a 32-track double CD album, in November 2015. Nightbird comprised the complete Blues Alley concert recordings, including eight previously unreleased songs, from the night of January 3, 1996. The European version of the CD package included a DVD with 12 video performances from the Blues Alley concert. Nightbird was also released as a four-LP vinyl package worldwide.

== Legacy ==
In 2001, Songbird: Eva Cassidy: Her Story By Those Who Knew Her, a book on the life and work of Cassidy based on interviews with close family and associates, was released in the UK. A US edition published by Gotham Books was released in 2003 and included two additional chapters on her influences and success in the US. Her life story has been adapted into a musical and also a Broadway piece for cancer benefit.

A number of filmmakers have proposed films based on Cassidy's life and have worked with her family, but to date none of these projects have progressed past the early development stages. In late 2007, AIR Productions acquired the rights to produce a film based on Cassidy's life, produced by Amy Redford (daughter of actor/director Robert Redford), Irwin Shapiro and Rick Singer. In an interview a year earlier, Cassidy's parents suggested Kirsten Dunst and Emily Watson as possible actresses who could play their daughter.

A mural was made in Cassidy's honor in 2022 in Annapolis, Maryland, where she once lived.

A feature-length documentary film, The Essence of Eva, premiered at the 2025 Galway Film Fleadh. Co-directors Alex Fegan and Malcolm Willis unearthed previously unknown video and audio and included interviews with her family, friends, and musical colleagues.

== Discography ==
=== Albums ===
- The Other Side (with Chuck Brown) (1992)
- Live at Blues Alley (1996 – live)
- Eva by Heart (1997)
- Time After Time (2000)
- Imagine (2002)
- American Tune (2003)
- Somewhere (2008)
- Simply Eva (2011)
- Nightbird (2015 – live)
- Acoustic (2017)
- I Can Only Be Me (with the London Symphony Orchestra) (2023)
- Walkin' After Midnight (2024 – live)

=== Compilation albums ===
- Songbird (1998)
- Wonderful World (2004)
- The Best of Eva Cassidy (2012)
