= Blues Alley =

American jazz nightclub in the Georgetown neighborhood of Washington, D.C.

Coordinates: 38.9047°N 77.0623°W

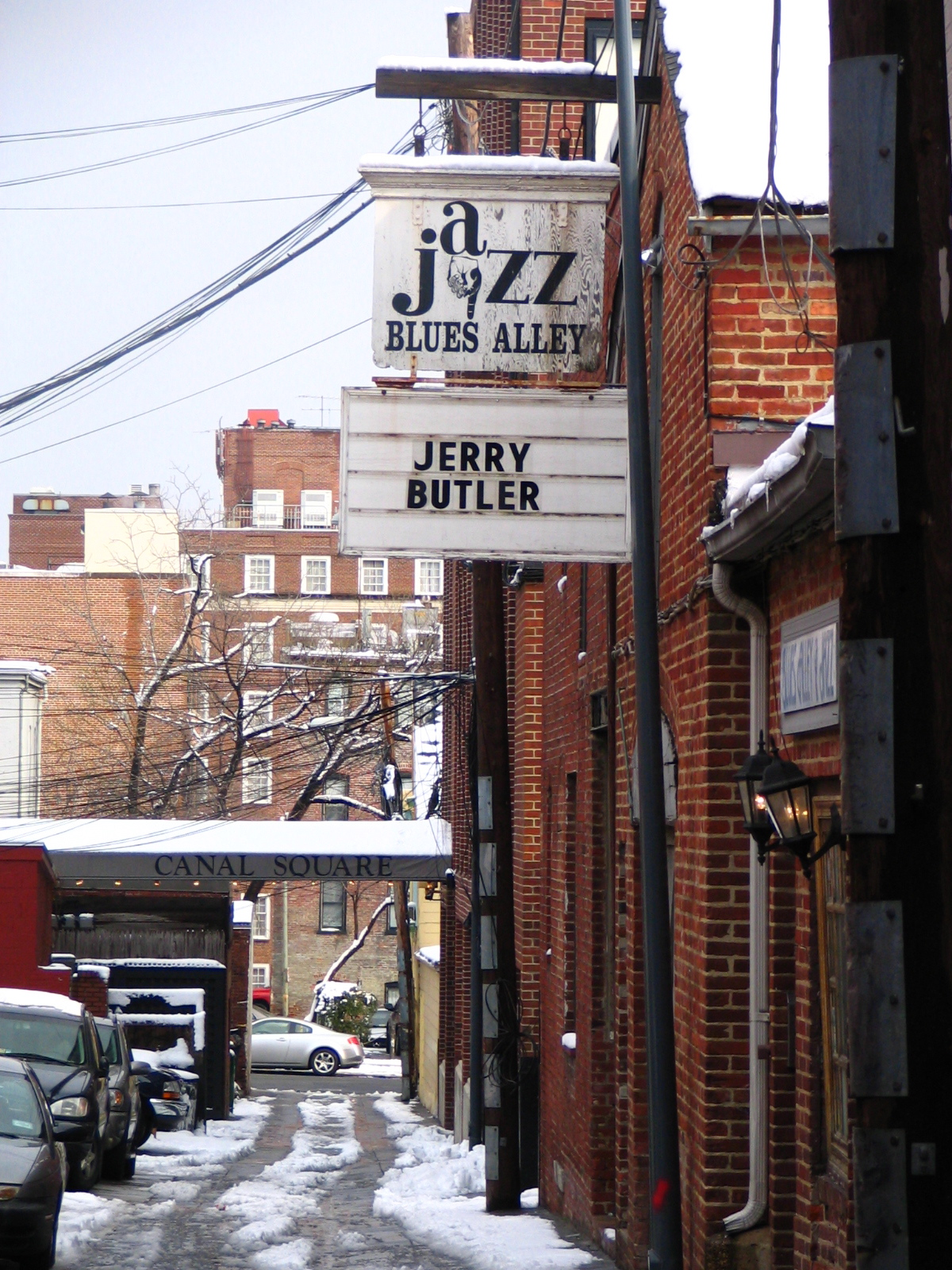
Blues Alley entrance seen from the street

Blues Alley, founded in 1965, is a jazz nightclub in the Georgetown neighborhood of Washington, D.C. It is the oldest continuing jazz supper club in the United States.

Known as “the house that Dizzy built,” the 125-seat venue was opened by musician Tommy Gwaltney. In 1969, he sold it to retired Air Force Colonel Bill Cannon. John Bunyan became the owner in 1973 and Harry Schnipper bought it in 2003; in 2021, Schnipper bought the building. A Baltimore location, Blues Alley Supper Club, opened in September 1988 but has since closed. In the 1990s, Schnipper opened another Blues Alley in Tokyo.

In 1965, Cannon began to provide a house band to back up single performers. Its line-up has included Gwaltney, Steve Jordan, Keter Betts and John Eaton. The house band was discontinued in 1977.

Musicians who have performed at Blues Alley include John Abercrombie, Monty Alexander, Mose Allison, Tony Bennett, Rory Block, Ruby Braff, Gary Burton, Charlie Byrd, Buck Clayton, Billy Cobham, Larry Coryell, Roy Eldridge, Maynard Ferguson, Rachelle Ferrell, Ella Fitzgerald, Kenny Garrett, Stan Getz, Bobby Hackett, Jim Hall, Billy Butterfield, Roland Hanna, Clancy Hayes, Buck Hill, Freddie Hubbard, Lurlean Hunter, Phyllis Hyman, Dr John, Stanley Jordan, Stacey Kent, Les McCann, Taj Mahal, Pat Metheny, Charles Mingus, Mark Murphy, Jaco Pastorius, Oscar Peterson, Joshua Redman, Sonny Rollins, Jimmy Rushing, Gil Scott-Heron, Charlie Shavers, George Shearing, Wayne Shorter, Maxine Sullivan, Ralph Towner, McCoy Tyner, Sarah Vaughan, Mary Wilson, Nancy Wilson, Teddy Wilson and Sol Yaged.

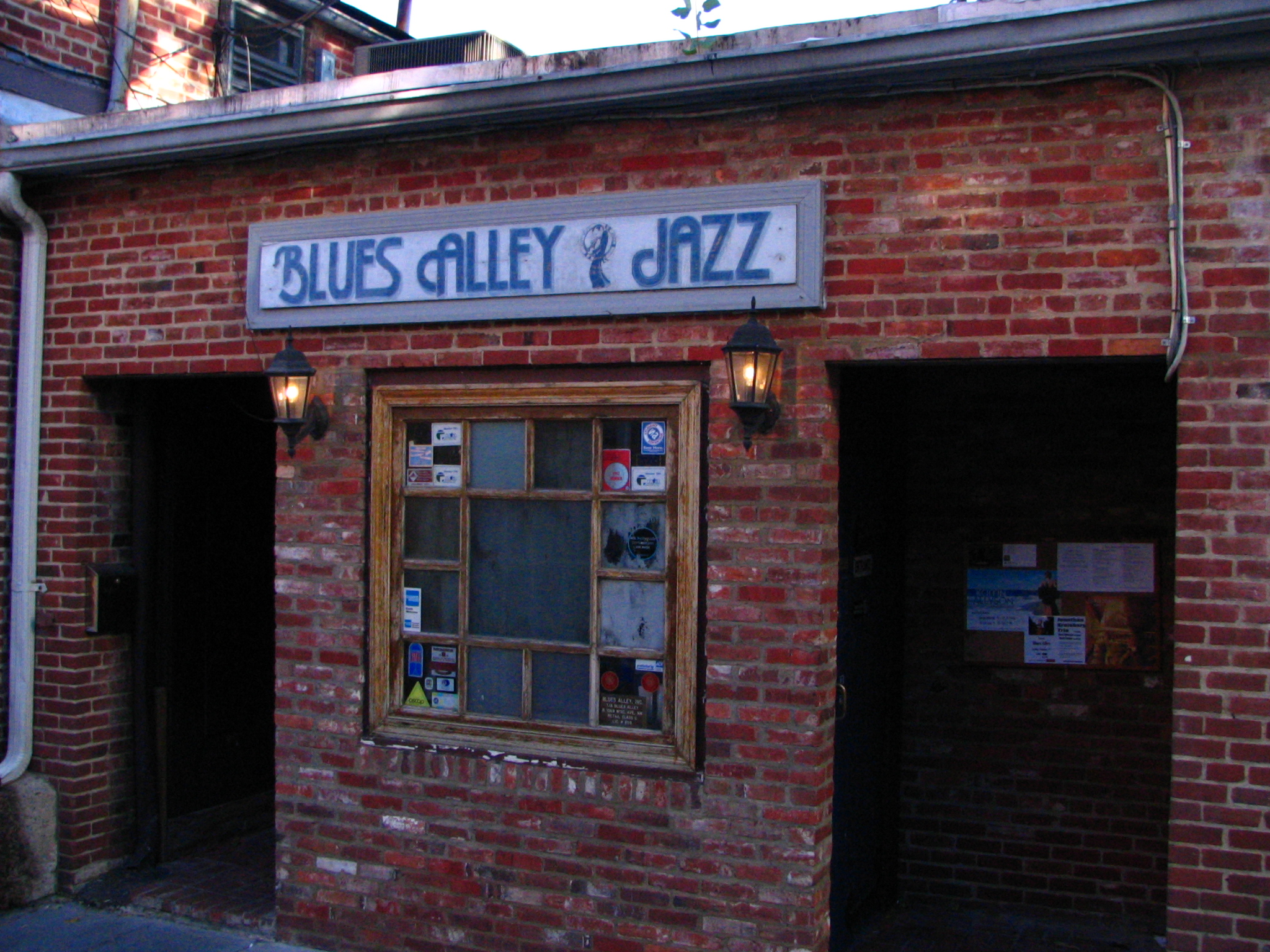
The front entrance to Blues Alley

Musicians who have recorded Live at Blues Alley albums include Eva Cassidy, Dizzy Gillespie (featuring Ron Holloway), Ahmad Jamal, Ramsey Lewis, Wynton Marsalis, Pat Martino, Max Roach, Stanley Turrentine, and Grover Washington Jr.

In 1975, during afternoons when the club was closed, Earl Hines, spent a week in Blues Alley making an hour-long film for British television, featuring Frank Hart, Blue's Alley's "clean-up man".

In 1986, Blues Alley established a non-profit jazz arm, the Blues Alley Jazz Society, which is dedicated to jazz education and outreach for local young performers. Education and outreach programs include the Blues Alley Youth Orchestra (founded 1992) and the Blues Alley Jazz Summer Camp.

== See also ==
- List of jazz venues
