= Tower of Meaning =

1981 album by Arthur Russell

Studio album by Arthur Russell
- Released: 1983
- Recorded: February 1981
- Genre: Orchestral, minimalism
- Length: 44:36
- Label: Chatham Square, Audika
- Producer: Arthur Russell

Arthur Russell chronology
24→24 Music (1981)	Tower of Meaning (1983)	World of Echo (1986)

Tower of Meaning is a 1983 instrumental album by American composer Arthur Russell, originally released on Philip Glass's Chatham Square label. It consists of orchestral pieces intended for theatrical use, recorded in 1981 and conducted by Julius Eastman.

== Background ==
The pieces featured on Tower of Meaning were originally intended for theater director Robert Wilson's staging of Euripides' Medea in the early 1980s. The collaboration was facilitated by Philip Glass but fell through after creative squabbling between Wilson and Russell; Russell was barred from rehearsals and eventually replaced by composer Gavin Bryars. Glass then released the tapes on his own Chatham Square label in a run of 320 copies.

The album is one of only two studio records released under Russell's name during his lifetime (the other is 1986's World of Echo). It was reissued in 2016 by the label Audika. In 2017, Peter Zummo and Bill Ruyle transcribed the pieces and arranged the album for live performance; it premiered in the UK that January.

== Reception ==
Professional ratings
Review scores
Source	Rating
AllMusic	4/5 stars
Pitchfork	7.0/10

AllMusic described Tower of Meaning as "an almost medievally pure music in which tone combinations of two or three notes tuned to modal/raga scales are played by various instrumental groups". Pitchfork stated that "it would be tough to claim that Tower of Meaning is one of Russell's greatest efforts", but noted that the album evinced "more of a clear grounding in a pre-existing musical lineage than anything else that Russell ever released" and "works well within its own self-imposed boundaries".

== Track listing ==
1. "Tower of Meaning" – 2:04
2. "Tower of Meaning" – 6:02
3. "Tower of Meaning" – 2:05
4. "Tower of Meaning" – 2:50
5. "Tower of Meaning" – 6:23
6. "Tower of Meaning" – 3:37
7. "Fragments from Tower of Meaning" – 21:39

== Personnel ==
Adapted from the liner notes. The musicians on the album are not credited.

- Arthur Russell – composer, producer
- Julius Eastman – conductor
- Ray Janos – mastering
- Kathleen Cooney – design
