= Go Bang =

Go Bang or variants may refer to:

- Go-Bang, an 1894 stage musical by Adrian Ross and F. Osmond Carr
- Gomoku or Go Bang, a game related to Pente
- "Go Bang! #5," a 1982 single by Dinosaur L from the album 24→24 Music.
- Go-Bang's, Japanese girl group
- Go Bang!, a 1988 album by Shriekback
- "Go Bang" (song), a 2017 song by Pnau

== See also ==
- Let's Go Bang, an album by Jennifer Love Hewitt
- Goban, the board used for the game of Go
