= My Skyscraper =

Studio album by Nirosta Steel
- Released: June 29, 2026
- Genres: Avant-garde; mutant disco; art pop; minimalist; folk; new wave
- Length: 83:21
- Label: Ulyssa

Nirosta Steel chronology
Cool Fire (2014)	My Skyscraper (2026)

My Skyscraper is a studio album by Scottish-American singer-songwriter Steven Hall, performing under the stage name Nirosta Steel. It was released on June 29, 2026, on Ulyssa Records. The album is a compilation of previously unreleased recordings made by Hall over a period of roughly 40 years. It received critical acclaim upon its release.

== Background ==
Ulyssa Records co-founders, Eric Deines and John Williamson, had been tipped off about Hall's 2014 album Cool Fire by Shane Lavers of Chanel Beads, which prompted the pair to reach out to Hall for unreleased Nirosta Steel material.

Deines encouraged Hall to submit music that was recorded on his own, rather than his collaborations with Arthur Russell. As a result, "Go For The Night" is the only song on the album co-written by Russell. Production by Russell also appears on the songs "Triangularize", "Fresh Feelings", and "Special Weakness".

== Critical reception ==
My Skyscraper was released to critical acclaim. In a 9.0/10 review for Pitchfork, Harry Tafoya called the album "at once an archival triumph and one of the year's most thrilling new releases," writing that "the record seems to exist in its own time warp, echoing through the years while confounding any simple, linear notion of tradition or progress." Writing for Paste, Andy Steiner awarded the album an "A" rating, describing its music as "anachronistic, slipping back and forth across time," and noting its combination of "velvety disco leaking out of Paradise Garage" and "improvisational ramblings over punk guitar."

== Track listing ==
Track listing and credits are adapted from Tidal.

My Skyscraper track listing
No.	Title	Producer(s)	Length
1.	"English Party"	Steven Hall	3:26
2.	"Boss Trix (Benny's Song)"	Drop Out Orchestra	5:53
3.	"New Boy"	Hall	2:30
4.	"YHEMA"	Hall	4:36
5.	"Triangularize"	Bright and Early	3:24
6.	"First Love (Ruffian Mix)"	Hall	2:46
7.	"Super Boy"	Hall	2:56
8.	"Lost in Music"	Hall	7:04
9.	"First Love (Disco Moonbeam Mix)"	Hall	3:15
10.	"My Name Is Night"	Hall	4:11
11.	"Fresh Feeling"	Bright and Early	9:22
12.	"Special Weakness"	Bright and Early	13:33
13.	"Grey Boy (A Capella Mix)"	Hall	4:06
14.	"Mohan (Mandarin Version)"	Jim Shum	2:54
15.	"Go for the Night"	Arthur's Landing	5:40
16.	"Thaitanium"	Hall	5:21
17.	"Jovi Song"	Hall	2:24
Total length:			83:21

== Personnel ==
Credits are adapted from Tidal.

=== Musicians ===
- Steven Hall —composer (all tracks), vocals (tracks 1-13, 15-17), rhythm guitar (1, 15), bass (3, 10, 16), drum programming (3, 4, 16), guitar (3-12, 14, 16, 17), keyboards (3 ,8, 9, 16), bass synthesizer (4), harmonica (9)
- Tor Thani — lead guitar (1)
- Drop Out Orchestra — bass (2, 9), drum Programming (2), guitar (2), keyboards (2), piano (9)
- Nell Shakespeare — vocals (2)
- Arthur Russell — drum programming (5), drums (11, 12), composer (15)
- Alex Cortex — composer (7), drum programming (7), keyboards (7)
- Nikolaus Neumann — composer (9)
- Hung Chiu Fung —vocals (14)
- Ernie Brooks — bass (15)
- Bill Ruyle —drums (15)
- Elodie Lauten — keyboards (15)
- Larry Saltzman — lead guitar (15)
- Mustafa Ahmed — percussion (15)
- Peter Zummo — trombone (15)
- Joyce Kirby — vocals (15)

=== Technical ===
- Steven Hall —engineering (1, 3, 4, 6, 7, 8-10, 13, 16, 17)
- Bob Blank — engineering (5)
- Mark Friedman — engineering (5)
- Jim Shun — engineering (14)
- Alex Lipsen — engineering (15)
- Brennan Green — engineering (15)
- Peter Zummo — engineering (15)
- Gabriel Guerra — mastering
