= Calling Out of Context =

Compilation album by Arthur Russell
- Released: March 16, 2004
- Recorded: 1985–1990
- Genre: Synth-pop
- Length: 60:11
- Labels: Audika Records (US); Rough Trade (UK)

Arthur Russell chronology
The World of Arthur Russell (2004)	Calling Out of Context (2004)

Calling Out of Context is a compilation album of songs written and recorded by experimental musician Arthur Russell. It was released on March 16, 2004, by Audika Records in the United States and by Rough Trade Records in the United Kingdom. Nearly all of the songs included on Calling Out of Context had never been previously released in any form.

== Production ==
The songs selected for Calling Out of Context were recorded by Russell at his home and various studios between 1985 and 1990. The tracks were taken from Russell's unreleased 1985 album Corn and a later unfinished album for Rough Trade Records. Some of the songs, including "That's Us/Wild Combination", were meticulously reworked and rerecorded dozens of times by Russell, up until his death in 1992.

In addition to singing and songwriting, Russell played many of the instruments on the album, including cello, percussion, guitar, keyboards, and vocals. Many of the tracks feature percussion and drum programming from Mustafa Khaliq Ahmed, as well as synthesizers and trombone playing by Peter Zummo. Both Ahmed and Zummo were longtime collaborators with Russell. Noted vocalist Jennifer Warnes contributed singing to "That's Us/Wild Combination". Steven Hall contributed electronic drums to the record.

This was the first album released by Audika Records, and was done so after obtaining the exclusive licensing agreement with the estate of Arthur Russell to issue previously unreleased and out of print material from the musician's vast archive. The compilation producers were Melissa Jones, Steve Knutson, and Russell's longtime partner Tom "Sisu" Lee.

== Reception ==
Professional ratings
Review scores
Source	Rating
Allmusic	3.5/5 stars
Pitchfork	7.9/10
PopMatters	(very favorable)
Stylus	A−

Calling Out of Context received positive reviews. AllMusic critic Andy Kellman noted that "with the many hats Russell wore, Calling out of Context should hammer home the fact that he was also a dynamite writer of heart-on-sleeve love songs -- not just a formidable cellist and innovative disco producer." PopMatters wrote that "Calling Out of Context demands that the world take pause and recognize the contributions Russell made to the disparate genres of dance, disco, dub, and experimental music. His absolute fearlessness in lending his own unique style to even the most unlikely sound combinations is peerless." Stylus wrote that "criminally overlooked for far too long, Russell is finally getting his due," calling him "a genius—never to be recognized in his own time, but to be enjoyed by generations to come."

== Track listing ==
All songs written by Arthur Russell.

1. "The Deer In The Forest Part 1" – 1:35
2. "The Platform On The Ocean" – 8:04
3. "You And Me Both" – 3:45
4. "Calling Out Of Context" – 5:45
5. "Arm Around You" – 6:32
6. "That's Us/Wild Combination" – 6:58
7. "Make 1, 2" – 2:49
8. "Hop On Down" – 6:02
9. "Get Around To It" – 4:58
10. "I Like You!" – 5:00
11. "You Can Make Me Feel Bad" – 1:28
12. "Calling All Kids" – 7:15

== Personnel ==
- Art direction, design – Melissa Zhao Jones (2)
- Compilation Producer – Melissa Zhao Jones (2), Steve Knutson, Tom Lee (3)
- Executive Producer [Compilation Executive Producer] – Steve Knutson
- Liner notes – Steve Knutson
- Mastered by – Ray Janos
- Photography [Cover Photography] – Jeanette Beckman
- Producer, Mixed by – Arthur Russell, Killer Whale (tracks: 1, 2, 4)
- Technician [Post Production And Digital Transfers] – Mikel Rouse (tracks: 3, 5, 6, 9 to 12)
- Words By, Music By – Arthur Russell
