= Ulyssa =

American creative services company and independent record label

- Type: Private
- Industry: Music
- Founded: 2020
- Founder: John Williamson; Eric Deines
- Area served: United States; Mexico
- Website: https://www.ulyssa.rip/

Certain Death Mitigation Services LLC (doing business as Ulyssa) is an American creative services company and independent record label based out of Bloomington, Indiana and San Miguel de Allende. It was founded in 2020 by John Williamson and Eric "EO" Deines, and specializes in releasing limited runs of cassette tapes consisting of compilation of music discovered on Spotify.

Ulyssa became notable following release of 2026's My Skyscraper by Nirosta Steel, which according to Williamson "had $15 in the bank" before the album's release. Following My Skyscraper, Ulyssa released Themes Vol. 1 & 2, an album by interdisciplinary artist Ross Simonini.

== Releases ==
Each official Ulyssa release is ordered with a number prefixed by the letters "ULY".

ULY Number	Title	Artist	Year
ULY001	Bloomington '87	Mellencamp & Reed	2020
ULY003	<1,000: Hotdogging & Peacocking Vol.1		2020
ULY004	Rio Nilo 66	Sam Gendel & Ethan Braun	2021
ULY005	You Can Be Loved	Konradsen	2021
ULY007	Ulyssa Presents: Double Gee	Double Gee	2021
ULY008	Ulyssa Presents: 40% Foda/Maneírissimo	40% Foda/Maneírissimo	2021
ULY009	Ulyssa Presents: A Certain Frank	A Certain Frank	2021
ULY010	GOOFO	Little Wings	2021
ULY011	<1,000: Hotdogging & Peacocking Vol.2		2021
ULY012	The Shape of Toejazz To Come		2022
ULY013	Flatboat River Witch: 1994 - 2015	David Michael Moore	2022
ULY014	After	Kukangendai	2022
ULY015	Hello Eyes	Eric Chenaux	2022
ULY016	Working Together For Our Privacy	Wold	2022
ULY017	<1,000: Of Biblical Proportions		2022
ULY023	Classic Assholes: 2007-2022	BCNC	2022
ULY018	Bitches Toe		2023
ULY019	Another Cup in Another Cup	Duwap Kaine	2023
ULY020	Toejazz for Debby		2023
ULY021	Overflight	Craig Peyton	2023
ULY022	Adiago Fishing	David Michael Moore	2023
ULY024	Contrahouse		2024
ULY025	100% Prod I.V	LUCY (Cooper B. Handy)	2024
ULY026	Bird Head Burlando	David Michael Moore	2024
ULY027	Perplex	Julie Ragbeer	2024
ULY028	Toe Hunters		2024
ULY029	Everybody Gets What They Want: The Gospel of John R. Brusseau		2024
ULY030	Buzzcats... Raw and Dirty	David Michael Moore	2024
ULY031	Circle the Wagons	David Michael Moore	2024
ULY032	Lunch is Having Lunch	David Michael Moore	2024
ULY033	Schizoid Zither...Mutations	David Michael Moore	2024
ULY034	Double Mug	Inga McDaniel	2024
ULY035	Tooth Mama Coming	David Michael Moore	2024
ULY036	Return of the 5000lbs Toe		2025
ULY040	Umburkus Returns	David Michael Moore	2025
ULY037	Contrahouse 日本		2025
ULY038	Ulyssa Presents: Hank Donahue	Hank Donahue	2025
ULY039	Contralepsy		2025
ULY041	Ulyssa Presents: Doug Newman	Doug Newman	2025
ULY042	Exclusive Flavor	DJ Monkeynuts	2025
ULY043	Cornblis Highway	Jack Alboher	2025
ULY044	My Skyscraper	Nirosta Steel	2026
ULY045	Themes Vol. 1 & 2	Ross Simonini	2026
