= Nirosta Steel =

Scottish musician

- Hall performing in 2026

Background information
- Born: Steven Hall; June 28, 1957 (age 69); Glasgow, Scotland
- Genres: Disco; Art pop

Steven Hall (born June 28, 1957), known professionally as Nirosta Steel, is a Scottish musician. A key member of the 1980s downtown arts scene in New York City, Hall garnered broader recognition with the release of the 2026 compilation album My Skyscraper.

== Early life ==
Hall was born in the Milngavie suburb of Glasgow. When his father died, Hall's mother placed a personal ad in the International Herald Tribune to find a second husband and relocated the family to Wilmington, Delaware to marry Hall's new stepfather.

As a student at Brandywine High School, Hall met poets such as Allen Ginsberg who visited his campus, and he joined them on visits to New York City. He encountered prominent cultural figures who resided at or visited the Poets' Building at 437 East 12th Street in the East Village, such as Richard Hell of the band Television. It was at the Poets' Building where he met Arthur Russell, who would go on to be a frequent collaborator.

== Education ==
Hall was admitted to Columbia University with a recommendation letter written by Ginsberg. While he intended to study poetry with Kenneth Koch, he later switched focus and studied art history and architecture. He took his stage name, Nirosta Steel, from the anti-rust alloy on the Chrysler Building.

== Career ==
Hall collaborated with Arthur Russell on projects such as the disco group Loose Joints. Hall was active in East Asia throughout his twenties, collaborating with the Hong Kong theatre troupe Zuni Icosahedron and scoring films in Taiwan.

Following Russell's death from AIDS in 1992, Hall launched multiple projects in his honor including Arthur's Landing, a tribute group of Russell's collaborators. Hall appeared in the 2008 documentary Wild Combination: A Portrait of Arthur Russell.

In 2014, Hall released Cool Fire, a live album recorded at a Taiwanese bookstore in 1999, which he followed up with the 2017 album Dry Ice. Shane Lavers of Chanel Beads discovered Cool Fire and shared it with the co-founders of the record label ULYSSA, who asked Hall for any additional unreleased work. This material, recorded over four decades, was compiled into the album My Skyscraper, released in 2026 to critical acclaim.

On November 13, 2026, Hall released a cover of Russell's "The Boy With a Smile" for the Club Kid soundtrack EP.

== Personal life ==
Hall is bisexual. He resides in Champaign, Illinois with his husband.

== Discography ==
- Cool Fire (2014)
- Dry Ice (2017)
- My Skyscraper (2026)
