= Picture of Bunny Rabbit =

Compilation album by Arthur Russell
- Released: June 23, 2023
- Recorded: 1985–1986
- Studios: Battery Sound, New York City, New York, United States
- Genre: Experimental music
- Length: 38:00
- Language: English
- Label: Audika

Arthur Russell chronology
Iowa Dream (2019)	Picture of Bunny Rabbit (2023)

Picture of Bunny Rabbit is a 2023 compilation album representing some of the last studio session work by American experimental musician Arthur Russell. The album continues a series of archival releases from record label Audika, with this collection containing recordings that were made for World of Echo. It has received positive reviews from critics.

== Reception ==
According to the review aggregator Metacritic, Picture of Bunny Rabbit received "universal acclaim" based on a weighted average score of 97 out of 100 from five critic scores. Editors at AllMusic rated this album 4.5 out of 5 stars, with critic Fred Thomas writing that "Picture of Bunny Rabbit's continuance of that pure spirit is a gift to anyone with a special place in their heart for Russell, and even more evidence of just how peerless he was an artist". Nick Roseblade of Clash Music gave this compilation a 9 out of 10, calling it "a beautiful album" that is a "sublime example" of Russell's musical genius. In Exclaim!, Kaelen Bell made this her staff pick and writing "these opalescent, alien songs are as difficult to square as any in his awe-inspiring catalogue, shivering along streaks of cello and burbling pulses that scatter and circle like fireflies. But while they may be largely inscrutable, they're also endlessly beautiful and mind-meltingly singular." Eamon Sweeney of The Irish Times gave Picture of Bunny Rabbit 4 quote of 5 stars, describing it as "another beautifully understated but bravely adventurous suite of songs and instrumentals". Pitchfork's editors chose this as Best New Reissue of the week and critic Jayson Greene gave it a 9.0 out of 10, stating that "there’s something near-holy about overhearing Russell in this magic half-light again". Editors of The Quietus chose this as Reissue of the Week and editors chose this as one of the best albums of June and July 2023; critic Eden Tizard writing that with this release, it is "as if this singular, unfathomable place [of Russell's music] has become more vast, or perhaps that new depths have been uncovered". In The Washington Post, Michael Andor Brodeur calls this, "a stunning specimen of Arthur at his Arthurest" and states that it continues the enigma of Russell as a person and musician.

== Use in media ==
"The Boy with a Smile" was featured in the 2026 film Club Kid.

== Track listing ==
All songs written by Arthur Russell.

No.	Title	Length
1.	"Fuzzbuster #10"	3:22
2.	"Not Checking Up"	4:35
3.	"Telling No One"	2:30
4.	"Fuzzbuster #06"	2:33
5.	"The Boy with a Smile"	4:00
6.	"Fuzzbuster #09"	2:06
7.	"Very Reason"	3:59
8.	"Picture of Bunny Rabbit"
9.	"In the Light of a Miracle"	6:42
Total length:		38:00

== Personnel ==
- Arthur Russell – vocals, cello, keyboards, guitar, harmonica, echo, production
- Steve Knutson – compilation production
- Tom Lee – compilation production
- Eric Liljestrand – engineer
- Molly Smith – art direction, design
- Timothy Stollenwerk – mastering at Stereophonic Mastering

== See also ==
- List of 2023 albums
