= Neville G. Pemchekov Warwick =

Neville G. Pemchekov Warwick (1932–1993) was a modern interpreter of Buddhism and a central figure of the spiritual movement of California during the late 1960s and the 1970s. He made an ancient Japanese Buddhist practice of firewalking popular in the USA.

== Life ==
Warwick was born in Russia and "immigrated to America in the 1960s." According to John Gordon Melton he had already a Buddhist background as a child in Russia and started a training in the Japanese tradition of Shugendō in 1940 at the age of eight. He was promoted to the rank of a Dai Sendatsu (大先達), "Great Sendatsu" within this tradition. A Sendatsu "is one who advances ahead (saki ni tassuru 先に達する), and hence who precedes in understanding and/or achievement in any field, be it scholarship, art, religious practice, and so on. His precedence, therefore, makes him a leader and a guide for others."

In Russia he accomplished studies as physician and a musician. After his migration from Russia he became a disciple of Lama Anagarika Govinda in India and America. Govinda made him a member of his order of the Arya Maitreya Mandala, bestowing the name Vajrabodhi on him.

== Activities ==
Combining the teachings and practices of his Shugendō background with the teachings of Lama Anagarika Govinda, Pemchekov Warwick founded an organization called Kailas Shugendō in the late 1960s. The Kailas Shugendō became a chapter of the order of the Arya Maitreya Mandala. "The religious practices of these individuals include daily fire rituals of several kinds, maintaining an ambulance rescue service (pulling people out of plane wrecks and fires), as well as mountain climbing – and country-western music. Unlike many "spiritual groups," the Kailas Shugendo people make no effort to proselytize. In fact, they actively discourage would-be converts. They are extremely disciplined, yet they possess an overflowing humor." As the head of the Kailas Shugendō Pemchekov Warwick was termed Ajari. For this reason and his being a physician and Doctor of Medicine, he was and is often referred to as "Dr. Ajari".

In the Kailas Shugendō the members twice a day "observe Goma, the fire ceremony. The ritual master conducts while the members chant. Once a week Hiwatari, fire purification, is performed. Members walk the sacred fire but are not burned. At intervals, members go to the mountains for ascetic practices-shugyo (climbing the mountain while chanting mantra), going under ice-cold waterfalls, and hanging people off rocks. Music is also a part of daily life. Headquarters of the ashram are in San Francisco, California, where it offers musical and cultural presentations to the Bay Area community and performs emergency community services."

Pemchekov Warwick and the Kailas Shugendo Mantric Sun Band were featured in Allen Ginsberg's Pacific High Studio Mantras as "Reverend Adjari and Buddhist Chorus." Pemchekov Warwick was a friend of Jerry Garcia, bandleader of Grateful Dead. During a San Francisco concert of Grateful Dead in March 1971, Pemchekov Warwick and members of the Kailas Shugendō "dressed in oriental-style hiking attire, presented ritual segments, including their fire-walk."

Pemchekov Warwick was a close friend of Shunryu Suzuki, Alan Watts and Samuel L. Lewis, who wrote about him: "When Rev. Warwick came here with the Tibetan transmissions he missed those credentials which Americans, especially American ladies love—the right kind of turban or hair on the head or hair on the face, outlandish clothing, outlandish habits, etc. To our society these are signs of God, but only if on the 'right' persons." Lewis also introduced Pemchekov Warwick to Allen Ginsberg.

The musician Arthur Russell had been a disciple of Pemchekov Warwick. He joined the Kailas Shugendō in February 1969. Ex-disciple Paul Nagy is more critical, stating " In some of his ex-disciple's minds, Warwick is the classic, crazy false teacher. I did accept him as a teacher, but withdrew from his cult once he tried to position himself as a guru". Nagy gives little more information, but had earlier stated that he had been directed to Warwick to study Tantric teachings.
