= Marilyn Klaus =

American choreographer and artistic director

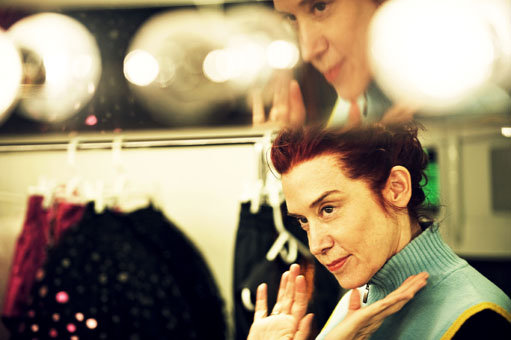
- Occupations: Choreographer, artistic director
- Known for: Ballets with a Twist
- Website: balletswithatwist.com

Marilyn Klaus is an American choreographer and artistic director based in New York City. She founded her company, Ballets with a Twist, in 1996, in association with Grammy-nominated composer Stephen Gaboury and costume designer Catherine Zehr.

== Early career ==
A Los Angeles native, Klaus was first introduced to dance by her father, who brought her to shows and classes in various styles — including classical ballet, tap, and hula — during her childhood. She later studied ballet with Carmelita Maracci and Valerie Grieg, trained with second-generation Isadora Duncan dancer Hortense Kooluris, and received a degree in Theater Dance from the New York University Tisch School of the Arts. Klaus went on to create and perform in her own works of dance, theater and film in the United States and Europe. She also choreographed dances for music videos, opera, and children's television.

== Ballets with a Twist ==
In 1996, Klaus founded Ballets with a Twist in association with Grammy-nominated composer Stephen Gaboury and costume designer Catherine Zehr. The company first presented its original collection of theatrical dance vignettes, Cocktail Hour: The Show, in Manhattan, in 2009. The production has been seen in a variety of venues — from traditional theaters to outdoor stages and cabarets — across the country. In conjunction with many of its performances, Ballets with a Twist offers outreach activities such as dance workshops, performance opportunities, and musical collaborations for youth; public cultural enrichment presentations; and artistic residencies.
