= The World of Arthur Russell =

Compilation album by Arthur Russell
- Released: January 26, 2004
- Genre: Disco, avant-garde
- Length: 73:10
- Label: Soul Jazz

Arthur Russell chronology
The World of Arthur Russell (2004)	Calling Out of Context (2004)

The World of Arthur Russell is a compilation album by Arthur Russell, released in 2004 on Soul Jazz Records.

== Reception ==
Professional ratings
Review scores
Source	Rating
AllMusic	4.5/5 stars
Pitchfork Media	8.9/10
Stylus	B+
Tiny Mix Tapes	3.5/5 stars
Uncut	5/5 stars

Simon Reynolds of Uncut gave the album a five star rating, but stated that the album "is splendid but in truth only scratches the surfaces of Russell's officially released work (plus there's mountains of unreleased material originally deemed too kooky for the '80s post-disco market)."

== Track listing ==
1. "Go Bang" (Dinosaur L) – 7:36
2. "Wax the Van" (Lola) – 5:27
3. "Is It All Over My Face" (Loose Joints) – 6:57
4. "Keeping Up" (Arthur Russell) – 6:20
5. "In the Light of the Miracle" (Arthur Russell) – 13:21
6. "A Little Lost" (Arthur Russell) – 3:18
7. "Pop Your Funk" (Loose Joints) – 6:38
8. "Let's Go Swimming" (Arthur Russell) – 5:14
9. "In the Cornbelt" (Dinosaur L) – 5:57
10. "Treehouse" (Arthur Russell) – 2:17
11. "Schoolbell/Treehouse" (Indian Ocean) – 10:05
