= World of Echo =

1986 album by Arthur Russell

Studio album by Arthur Russell
- Released: 1986
- Recorded: 1984–1986
- Genre: Dub; ambient pop; folk; electro-acoustic; experimental; art pop
- Length: 51:24
- Label: Upside (US); Rough Trade (UK)
- Producer: Arthur Russell; Phill Niblock; Steve Cellum; Peter Zummo; Ernie Brooks

Arthur Russell chronology
Instrumentals, 1974 – Vol. 2 (1984)	World of Echo (1986)	Another Thought (1994)

2005 re-issue cover

World of Echo is the second studio album by American musician Arthur Russell, released in 1986 on Upside Records in the US and in 1987 on Rough Trade Records in the UK. It is composed primarily of Russell's vocals, cello, and percussion, which are liberally treated with effects such as delay and reverb.

World of Echo was the final album released by Russell during his lifetime. It was widely reissued in 2005 by Audika and Rough Trade. The album was named the best of the 1980s by Fact in 2013, and the 25th best album of the decade by Pitchfork in 2018. It was included in NME's 2013 list of the 500 greatest albums of all time.

== Background and composition ==
World of Echo has been noted as prominently incorporating Russell's "folksy tenor, cello, and scant electronic microtones". It features Russell's employment of production effects, including prominent use of echo, reverb, and distortion. AllMusic referred to the album as a collection of "spare, dubby cello experiments." Several songs included are alternate versions of dance tracks that Russell produced as 12-inch singles, including "Let's Go Swimming", "Wax the Van", and "Treehouse".

Writing for Pitchfork, Cameron Macdonald noted that Russell's style of cello playing, often improvised, makes use of sporadic, imaginary sounds like "hollow thuds, window-washing brushes, chipped strings, knuckled knacks, and the boom of a floor peg dropping on concrete". He also commented that the cello "startlingly duets with his voice", leading to inharmonic sounds that makes it sound like the instrument "clears its throat during his awkward moments". Dusted also commented on the album's "skeletal framework", with "bare melodies rising to the surface, vocal lines encompassing wordless singing" and "constantly shifting textures swirling throughout".

== Release ==
The album was released in the US in 1986 and subsequently in the UK in March 1987. When it failed to perform well commercially, Russell reportedly requested that stickers be added to the packaging with the word "unintelligible."

Audika Records issued a remastered limited edition CD in 2004 which included bonus tracks and a DVD with footage by Phill Niblock. They subsequently reissued it on CD and LP in 2005. Rough Trade also reissued the album that year.

== Critical reception ==
Professional ratings
Review scores
Source	Rating
AllMusic	5/5 stars
Pitchfork	8.4/10
Q	2/5 stars
Stylus Magazine	B+

=== Early reviews ===
In a 1987 review for Melody Maker, David Stubbs positively described the music as "a fuzz, a blur, a rich, throbbing pulse, a signal in space", and Russell's vocals as "clotted, opaque, word-shapes in the clouds", noting a kinship with John Martyn's 1973 album Solid Air. He called the result "a giant, subterranean repository of Dub", and said, "what's at work is the old dub trick of suggesting what's not there, what's been dispensed with". Jonathan Romney of NME stated that "World of Echo contains some of Russell's golden greats, but the catch is that they're virtually unrecognisable", and also made a comparison to John Martyn "at his spaciest". Romney concluded that "it's fun watching the patterns change, but you sometimes get tired waiting for something to happen". More negatively, a Q review by Andy Gill said, "On this LP, unfortunately, the imagination displayed on the three mixes of [previous dance single] 'Let's Go Swimming' is all but completely absent", and that the titles of the songs "betray Arthur as just another art bore caught on the less meaningful fringes of New Age muzak. A big disappointment."

=== Later reception and accolades ===
Reviewing the album's 2004 reissue, Dusted called the album "easily the most significant, compelling, beautiful and monumental piece of work Russell ever committed to record." Pitchfork stated that "this material still sounds timeless. It's also Russell's most personal and radical statement." AllMusic described the album as an "incredible assemblage of ... subtle, transcendental" music. Stylus Magazine opined that the album "still appears fantastic, implausible, and above all, fresh," claiming that "Russell's tapestries of electro-acoustic syncopation and free-associative song can still be heard" in styles such as IDM, minimal techno, modern psychedelia, and freeform acoustic music. In a 2024 article for the London Review of Books, Ian Penman described the music as "sitting-room dub music, folk song with tape delay [...] a musical Impressionism where background and foreground merge in a dappled, smeary haze. These songs don’t feel ‘written’ in any conventional way; they are like pollen on the breeze."

In 2013, the album was ranked at number 301 on NME's list of the 500 greatest albums of all time. in the same year, it was also named the best album of the 1980s by Fact. In 2018, it was ranked the 25th best album of the 1980s by Pitchfork.

== Track listing ==
All tracks are written by Arthur Russell.

No.	Title	Length
1.	"Tone Bone Kone"	1:05
2.	"Soon-to-Be Innocent Fun / Let's See"	9:36
3.	"Answers Me"	2:11
4.	"Being It"	5:17
5.	"Place I Know / Kid Like You"	3:28
6.	"She's the Star / I Take This Time"	4:57
7.	"Tree House"	2:15
8.	"See-Through"	2:10
9.	"Hiding Your Present from You"	4:17
10.	"Wax the Van"	2:11
11.	"All-Boy All-Girl"	3:44
12.	"Lucky Cloud"	2:53
13.	"Tower of Meaning / Rabbit's Ear / Home Away from Home"	4:38
14.	"Let's Go Swimming"	2:42
Total length:		51:24

Reissue bonus tracks
No.	Title	Length
15.	"The Name of the Next Song"	8:00
16.	"Happy Ending"	4:23
17.	"Canvas Home"	2:34
18.	"Our Last Night Together"	3:27
Total length:		69:48

== Personnel ==
People involved in the making of this album include:

- Arthur Russell – cello, vocals, hand percussion, echo, producer, liner notes
- Ernie Brooks – producer
- Steve Cellum – producer
- Ray Janos – remastering
- Janet Perr – artwork
- Steve Knutson – reissue executive producer
- Tom Lee – reissue executive producer
- Phill Niblock – producer
- Peter Zummo – producer

== In popular culture ==
In 2016, American rapper and producer Kanye West sampled a section from Russell's "Answers Me" in his song "30 Hours".
