= Ballets with a Twist =

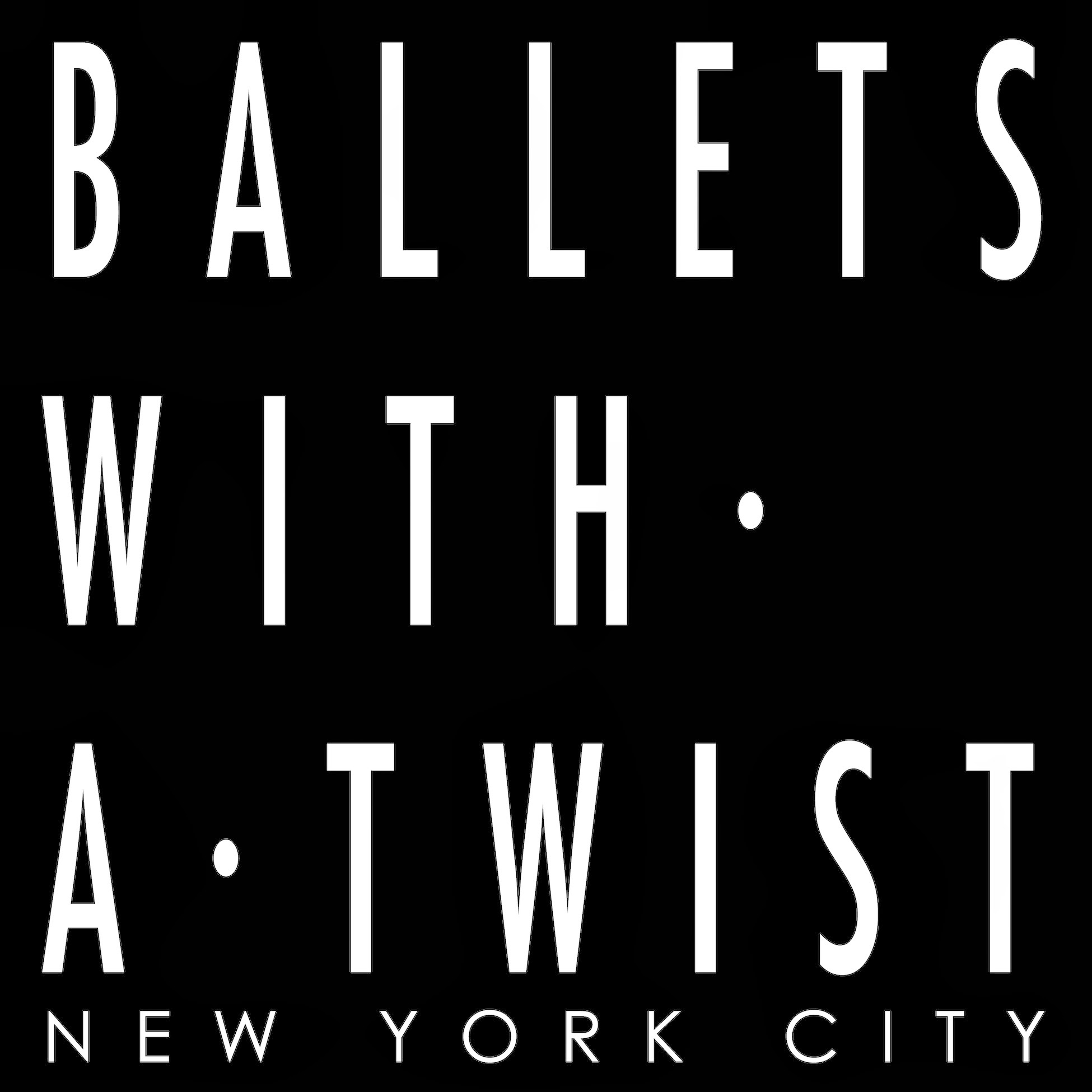

General information
- Name: Ballets with a Twist
- Year founded: 1996
- Founders: Marilyn Klaus, Stephen Gaboury
- Founding artistic director: Marilyn Klaus
- Principal venue: New York City USA
- Website: www.balletswithatwist.com

Artistic staff
- Artistic director: Marilyn Klaus

Ballets with a Twist is a New York City-based company that performs the work of Artistic Director Marilyn Klaus throughout the United States. Klaus founded Ballets with a Twist in 1996, in association with Grammy-nominated composer Stephen Gaboury. The company performed the first incarnation of its signature work, Cocktail Hour: The Show, a collection of theatrical dance vignettes celebrating iconic American social culture, in Manhattan, in 2009.

== History ==
In the 1980s and early 1990s, Klaus began working with composer Stephen Gaboury, presenting dances set to original music in New York City, around the United States, and in Europe. Premieres during this period included Klaus’s ballroom suite for eight women, Return to Normalcy; the quintet Silver Thaw; and The Johnny Show, a blend of honky-tonk, circus, and comic revue.

In 1996, Klaus formed Ballets with a Twist and began working with costume designer Catherine Zehr. In its inaugural year, the company appeared at the Clark Studio Theater and in 2011 at The David Rubenstein Atrium at Lincoln Center for the Performing Arts, the Church of the Holy Trinity, and other venues. Premieres included Seven-Minute Musical and a short musical film, Temple of Swing.

From 1996 to 2008, the company appeared at a variety of venues and events throughout New York City, including Long Island University's Kumble Theater for the Performing Arts, the Taste of Dance Festival, To the Pointe programs, and First Look at the Schermerhorn Performance Space in Brooklyn. Since 2002, the company has performed annually at the Tribeca Film Festival, premiering a new dance each year.

Cocktail Hour: The Show, Klaus's signature evening-length collection of dance vignettes, debuted at Manhattan Movement and Arts Center in November, 2009, with a total of nine cocktail-themed selections. In 2010, Ballets with a Twist presented the suite at Teatro in Piazza, an invitation-only event in Los Angeles, California. The next year, the company was invited to Lincoln Center for a sold-out performance of Cocktail Hour: The Show at the David Rubenstein Atrium, incorporating animated graphic background projections (now standard for the show) for the first time.

In 2012, XL Nightclub and Cabaret on 42nd Street presented two summer showings of Cocktail Hour: The Show in a unique floorshow format. XL hosted the company again in September for a performance featuring music icon Cyndi Lauper and benefiting Lauper's True Colors United. The company joined Lauper again several months later at the Beacon Theatre, for an appearance during Home for the Holidays, Lauper's annual True Colors benefit concert.

Also in 2012, Hamilton Stage, an arm of the Union County Performing Arts Center (UCPAC) in Rahway, New Jersey, welcomed Ballets with a Twist as an artistic affiliate during the theater’s inaugural season. During the company's residency, the UCPAC invited Klaus and her company to represent Hamilton Stage and the city before the New Jersey State Council on the Arts in celebration of the federal Our Town grant awarded to Rahway by the National Endowment for the Arts.

The company's 2013 fall season featured return engagements in New York City Public Libraries as part of the Lincoln Center Local program and Hamilton Stage; debut performances at PlayhouseSquare's Ohio Theatre, presented by Ballet in the City in Cleveland, Manhattan's Stage 48, and the Morris Museum's Bickford Theatre in Morristown, New Jersey; and local press appearances on Cleveland television stations WKYC and WEWS-TV.

Significant engagements in 2014 included premieres at Oregon's Craterian Theater and at Staten Island's St. George Theatre, where the company partnered with award-winning New Jersey youth gospel choir The Special Ensemble. A return to the Beacon Theatre for a guest appearance during Cyndi Lauper's fourth annual Home for the Holidays benefit concert brought the year to a close. 2015 saw additional company firsts: a Texas debut at El Paso's Plaza Theatre, featuring young dancers from Mexico; a lecture/performance presentation on costume design at The Museum at the Fashion Institute of Technology; a Vermont premiere at the Spruce Peak Performing Arts Center in Stowe; and a holiday engagement presented by the Chenango Arts Council in Norwich, New York.

In 2016, Ballets with a Twist completed a university residency with the Department of Theater Arts at Ohio Northern University. Following a week of master classes and choreography workshops, several students were invited to join the company on stage during performances at the Freed Center for the Performing Arts. In the spring, Pennsylvania's Bucks County Playhouse co-produced ballet for the first time with a weekend run of Cocktail Hour: The Show. Several months later, Brooklyn Ballet invited the company to participate in First Look, a curated program of new choreography, held at The Mark O’Donnell Theater. Closing out the year were a performance at Westchester Community College; another Beacon Theatre guest appearance at Lauper’s Home for the Holidays; and, in celebration of the season, a set of site-specific showings at Saks Fifth Avenue Downtown.

Ballets with a Twist visited Florida and Colorado for the first time in 2017 with engagements at The Sharon L. Morse Performing Arts Center, in The Villages, and the Colorado Chautauqua, in Boulder. Later that year, the company traveled to Oregon for a performance at the Florence Events Center, presented by Seacoast Entertainment Association. An engagement at Raue Center for the Arts, in Crystal Lake, Illinois, followed soon after. A fourth show-opening turn during Cyndi Lauper's Home for the Holidays benefit, at the Beacon Theatre, and a guest appearance in Everett Bradley's seasonal touring production, "Holidelic," at the Highline Ballroom, rounded out 2017.

Early 2018 found Ballets with a Twist in Augusta, Georgia, kicking off the centennial celebrations of the Imperial Theatre with the Academy of Richmond County Purple Pride Marching Band, then in Delray Beach, Florida, for a performance at Old School Square's Crest Theatre. In the summer months, the company made appearances at the White Plains Performing Arts Center and the Westhampton Beach Performing Arts Center, both in New York. A cabaret-style holiday-themed performance at New Jersey's White Eagle Hall, presented by the Jersey City Theater Center, capped off the year.

Ballets with a Twist traveled to the Midwest in early 2019, making stops at The Grand Oshkosh, in Wisconsin, and the Moraine Valley Community College Fine and Performing Arts Center, in Illinois. A pair of shows at the Zeiders American Dream Theater, a newly opened venue in Virginia Beach, rounded out the spring season. Later in the year, New Jersey's Avenel Performing Arts Center presented a four-performance run of Cocktail Hour: The Show as part of its inaugural lineup. In another first, the company was invited to appear during the launch of the NYC Department of Transportation's Summer Streets Dance Festival, at Astor Place. Fall engagements included a pair of shows at the Doudna Fine Arts Center (Eastern Illinois University) and another at Wyoming's Cheyenne Civic Center. To end 2019, the company returned to Old School Square with a holiday-themed performance at the Crest Theatre.

The beginning of 2020 brought Ballets with a Twist back to Texas for an appearance at the Charles W. Eisemann Center for Performing Arts. As the COVID-19 pandemic took hold later that year, the company launched a series of film projects staged on the rooftop of its own Tribeca dance studio and at various locations throughout the boroughs of Manhattan, Queens, and Brooklyn. These short films premiered virtually, via the Ballets with a Twist website, in 2021 and 2022. One dance suite choreographed exclusively for the camera during this period was translated to the stage in mid-2022, when the company returned to live performance with an engagement at the Madison Theatre at Molloy College.

In the spring of 2023, dancers, creative team, and production staff spent a week touring the midwest. With stops at Iowa’s Burlington Civic Music and Wisconsin’s The Grand Oshkosh, the company presented student matinees, taught master classes, and collaborated with The University of Wisconsin at Oshkosh’s Titan Thunder Marching Band who joined the company to perform Twist hit, “Brandy Alexander.” Fall of 2023 saw tours to Little Rock, Arkansas where Cocktail Hour: The Show closed out the ACANSA Arts Festival of the South and the Imperial Theater in Augusta, Georgia where Ballets with a Twist hosted a meet-and-greet and Halloween-themed performance. The company wrapped up the 2023 season with a holiday-inspired performance of “White Russian” —and other Twist Favorites— at West Chester, Pennsylvania’s Uptown! Knauer Performing Arts Center as part of the venue’s inaugural Holiday Extravaganza.

The 2024 season began with a performance at the Appalachian Theater of the High Country in Boone, North Carolina and continued in Hartford, Wisconsin at the Schauer Arts Center. Community outreach included an adult salsa class and workshops with the Schauer School of the Arts where young dancers were selected to perform with the professional company. Cocktail Hour: The Show was chosen by student ambassadors to be part of the University of Minnesota Morris’s 2024 Performing Arts Series. The company led master classes for local youth students at the university. A November performance at North Carolina’s Tryon Fine Arts Center and appearances on WSPA, Greenville’s local CBS station, rounded out the 2024 season.

Collaborations with the South Beauregard High School Marching Band, Lake Area Ballet Theatre, and Lake Charles Dance Academy were central to the company’s engagement as part of Banners at McNeese State University’s spring 2025 season. Over 60 student performers joined the company to perform at the Lake Charles Event Center. Ballets with a Twist then made its New Mexico debut at San Juan College’s Henderson Fine Arts center. The event included the premiere of “Bombay” and the revival of “Grappa.” Local radio station KSJE celebrated 30 years on the air by sponsoring the event.

As of 2026, the menu of vignettes in Cocktail Hour: The Show includes (in order of creation)

- "Champagne"
- "Sputnik"
- "Gimlet"
- "Roy Rogers"
- "Mai Tai"
- "Martini"
- "Margarita"
- "Shirley Temple"
- "Manhattan"
- "Brandy Alexander"
- "White Russian"
- "Absinthe"
- "Holy Water"
- "Scotch on the Rachmaninoff"
- "Mint Julep"
- "Zombie"
- "Bloody Mary"
- "Eau de Vie"
- "Boilermaker"
- "Singapore Sling"
- "Pink Lady"
- "Grappa"
- "Cuba Libre"
- "Caipirinha"
- "Mojito"
- "Lemon Drop"
- "Swimming Pool"
- "Hot Toddy"
- "Cin Cin"
- "Beer"
- "La Paloma"
- "Ranch Water"
- "Double Vision"
- "Smooth Criminal"
- “Bombay”
- “Greyhound”
- “Just Friends”

== Dancers ==
Ballets with a Twist maintains a consistent roster of 16 to 18 dancers. In addition, young apprentices frequently join the professionals on stage. When on tour, the company often hosts workshop auditions for local children, some of whom have the opportunity to rehearse and perform with the ensemble.

== Collaborations ==
Artistic partnerships with professional and aspiring musicians are a regular feature of Ballets with a Twist's regional and national outreach efforts. The company's in-house band, the B-Twist Orchestra, first joined the dancers in performance during Cyndi Lauper's Home for the Holidays concert at the Beacon Theatre in 2012. Subsequent productions of Cocktail Hour: The Show have included appearances by the Rahway High School Marching Band, East Cleveland's Mighty Shaw High School Marching Cardinal Band, Newark Symphony Hall's Special Ensemble, Georgia's Academy of Richmond County Purple Pride Marching Band, Brooklyn's L Train Brass Band, University of Wisconsin at Oshkosh’s Titan Thunder Marching Band, the South Beauregard High School Marching Band, and professional solo artists throughout the country.

== Artistic Staff ==
- Marilyn Klaus, Artistic Director
- Stephen Gaboury, Composer/Associate Director
- Catherine Zehr, Costume Designer/Associate Director
