= Stephen Gaboury =

American musical artist

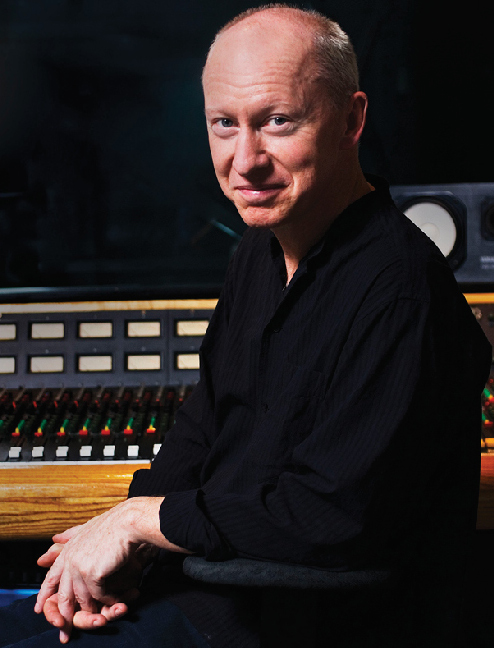

Background information
- Origin: Berkeley, California, United States
- Genres: Jazz, pop, rock, dance, soul
- Occupations: Musician, producer, composer, arranger, musical director
- Labels: Livewire Production & Recording
- Website: livewirenyc.com

Stephen Gaboury is an American musician, producer, composer, arranger, and musical director. In 1988, he created Livewire Production & Recording, a full production digital studio located in Manhattan's Tribeca district. Since 2001, Gaboury has toured internationally with Cyndi Lauper, with whom he received a Grammy nomination for best arrangement in 2004. Gaboury also collaborated on selections in Lauper's Broadway musical, Kinky Boots, which earned thirteen Tony nominations and six wins (including Best Original Score and Best Musical) during its first run in New York City in 2013.

== Early career ==
Gaboury, originally from Berkeley, California, studied composition at San Francisco State University. In the midst of his studies, he played with local jazz and rock ensembles, while also recording and touring with Country Joe and the Fish. He performed with Hoodoo, an Afro-Haitian band, which co-billed various concerts in the Bay Area, including Miles Davis, Weather Report, José Feliciano, Chick Corea, and McCoy Tyner, among others. He later formed and led his own band, Night Flyte, which moved to New York City in 1977 under the management of Bill Graham. In 1978, the band returned to California to perform at the Berkeley Jazz Festival, sharing the stage with such renowned musicians as Oscar Peterson, Herbie Hancock, Freddie Hubbard, and Eddie Jefferson.

== Touring Performances ==
After arriving in New York City in 1977, Gaboury became musical director, co-writer, and keyboardist for Angela Bofill. With Bofill, he toured nationally and appeared on The Merv Griffin Show. For Bofill's performance on The Tonight Show, Gaboury arranged and conducted for Doc Severinsen and The Tonight Show Band. In 1986, Gaboury performed with Wagnerian tenor Peter Hofmann (CBS Records) on a fifty-five city European tour, which resulted in the live album Peter Hofmann. With the advent of keyboard sampling technology, Gaboury covered all required orchestral parts including strings, brass, and orchestral percussion. In 1987, Gaboury joined Hofmann as conductor and arranger on yet another European tour. Later in 1987, Gaboury became musical director and arranger for Peruvian legend Yma Sumac, appearing with her live in New York City, as well as on The David Letterman Show.

The following year, Gaboury toured Europe as pianist and conductor for Broadway and cabaret star Ute Lemper. Soon after, he was invited to be musical director for CBS Records' 25th anniversary in Frankfurt, Germany. Additional touring credits as keyboardist include two international tours in 1990 and 1995 with The Blue Nile, as well as an international tour with Suzanne Vega in 1993.

In 1997, Gaboury served as conductor, arranger, and musical director for the Laura Nyro Memorial Concert at New York City's Beacon Theatre, which featured Patti LaBelle, Rickie Lee Jones, and Phoebe Snow.

As pianist and keyboardist, Gaboury has performed with Rufus Wainwright, Ben E. King, Little Anthony, Chris Botti, Shaggy, Pat Monahan, Sandra Bernhard, Scott Weiland, Earl King, Lenny Welch, Julia Fordham, Jack Donahue, Bonnie Koloc, Vicki Sue Robinson, and Helen Schneider.

In 2004, Gaboury performed with Cyndi Lauper at The Nobel Peace Prize ceremony in Oslo with The Norwegian Radio Orchestra, and at the Kennedy Center with the National Symphony Orchestra. He also appeared at the 2005 Great Wall of China Concert, the first international pop concert to take place at the landmark location. In 2011, Gaboury again performed with Lauper at the Human Rights Campaign's 15th Annual National Dinner, featuring a special address by President Barack Obama.

== Recording and Producing ==
As founder of Livewire Production and Recording, Gaboury has produced, arranged, performed, and engineered on projects such as Robert Jospé's album Inner Rhythm, featuring Michael Brecker and John Abercrombie; Jeff Golub's GAIA release Unspoken Words; Bobby Previte's acclaimed album Bump the Renaissance (Newsweek, Downbeat); Wayne Horvitz's Nine Below Zero (German Critics Award) and Todos Santos; and Tom Varner's Covert Action. Since 1988, Gaboury has also engineered and produced over 100 records featuring artists such as Cyndi Lauper, Marianne Faithfull, Laura Nyro, Eric Andersen, Jane Siberry, Phoebe Snow, Freddie Cole, Dianne Reeves, Gato Barbieri, Billy Cobham, and Lenny White.

As pianist and keyboardist, Gaboury has recorded with Ornette Coleman, Shawn Colvin, Jane Siberry, Suzanne Vega, Michael Shrieve, Dar Williams, Rosanne Cash, Jeffrey Gaines, Jeff Golub, David Broza, Jill Sobule, David Wilcox, Jane Olivor, and Bobby Previte. Gaboury's recordings with Cyndi Lauper include collaborations with Stevie Wonder, Sarah McLachlan, and Norah Jones.

== Compositions ==
=== Film ===
With Windham Hill artist Scott Cossu, Gaboury composed the soundtrack for Islands, a Maysles Brothers film documentary on environmental artist Christo's Biscayne Bay project. Gaboury then went on to compose the soundtrack for director Charlotte Zwerin's film Sculpting the Earth (Isamu Noguchi). In 1993, Gaboury composed the music to the short film Temple of Swing, as well as the soundtrack to Tradition on Ice, a documentary on the history of the New York Rangers With Amanda Kravat, he co-wrote the musical score to Eric Schaeffer's Never Again, starring Jill Clayburgh and Jeffrey Tambor. Additional credits include contributions to the soundtracks of feature films American Beauty and Boyhood.

=== Dance ===
While in California, Gaboury composed for the School of the Arts at Berkeley High School, writing music for various dance groups. Since 1980, Gaboury has been associated with New York-based dance company Ballets with a Twist, creating music for choreographer Marilyn Klaus's works Silver Thaw, Seven Minute Musical, and The Johnny Show. Gaboury and Klaus also collaborated to create the critically acclaimed Cocktail Hour: The Show, an evening-length ballet featuring Gaboury's original compositions. Cocktail Hour premiered in New York City, in 2009.

=== Other ===
Gaboury was composer and co-author (with Rebecca Rifkin) of the 1980 Off-Off Broadway musical Live at Crystal 6.

Activision Video Games commissioned Gaboury to compose the soundtracks to the games Pressure Cooker (1983) and Fireworks.
