= Peter Zummo =

American composer and trombonist (born 1948)

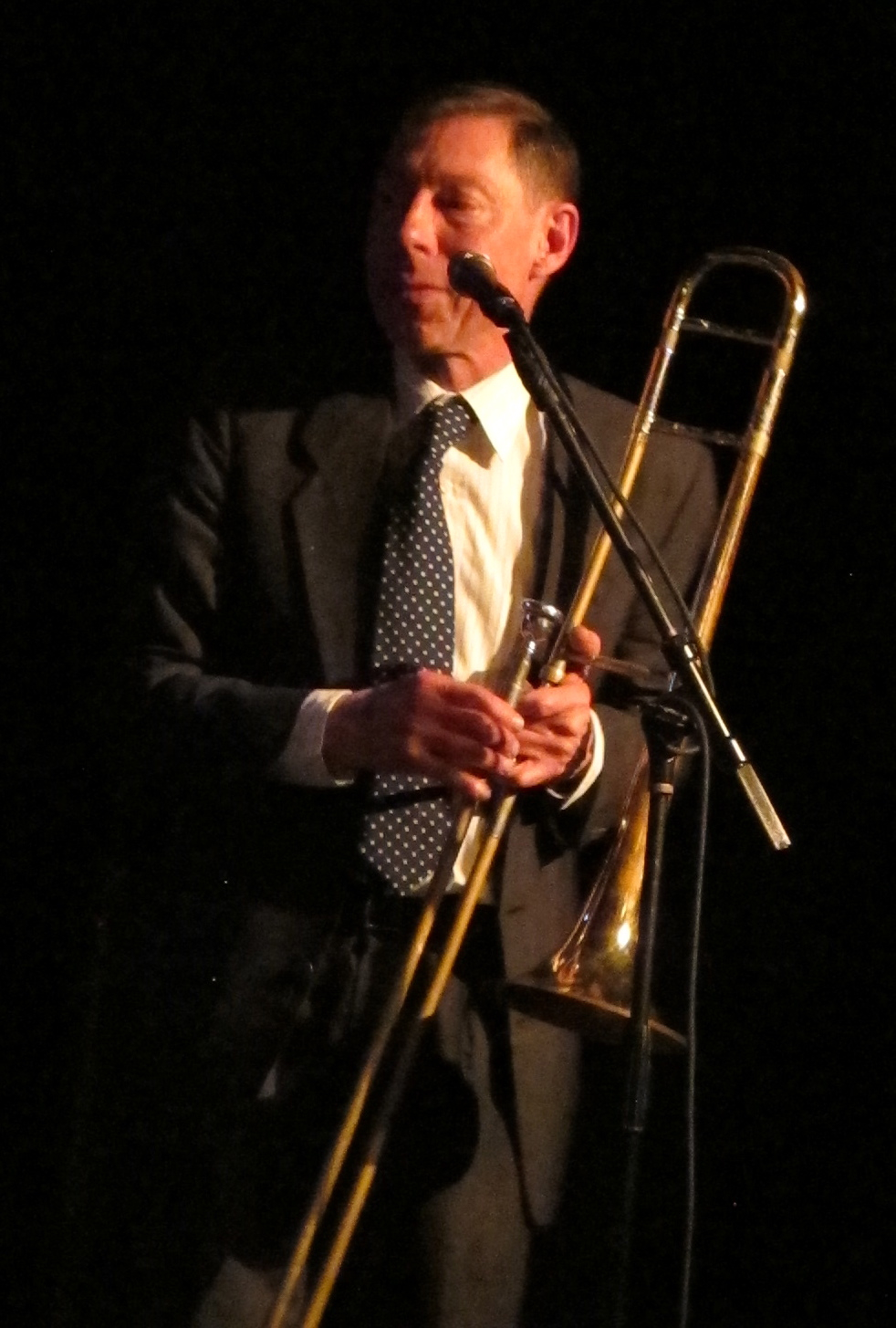
- Zummo in 2014

Background information
- Born: 1948 (age 77–78)
- Origin: Cleveland, Ohio, United States
- Genres: Rock; jazz; New Music; electronic music; disco; punk; world music
- Occupations: Musician, composer

Peter Zummo is an American composer and trombonist. He has been described as "an important exponent of the American contemporary classical tradition." He has called his own work "minimalism plus a whole lot more."

Since 1967, Zummo's compositions exploring rock, jazz, new music, electronic music, disco, punk, and world music have been presented in venues including Brooklyn Academy of Music, New York City Center, Experimental Intermedia Foundation, Roulette, The Kitchen, Dance Theater Workshop, and La MaMa Experimental Theatre Club, among many others in New York City. He has appeared in additional venues across the country and worldwide, including Café Oto and King's Place in London, KRAAK Festival in Brussels, and Rewire Festival in The Hague.

The website of the music magazine Pitchfork called Zummo's music “the sound of sublimity…that sends shivers down the nervous system,” and in an interview with The Quietus, Scottish deejay JD Twitch (Keith McIvor) characterized Zummo's work as “sheer bliss.”

== Composing and performing career ==
In the British culture blog "The Ransom Note," Tim Wilson wrote that some of Zummo's "most familiar" music was created with cellist Arthur Russell. Zummo played on most of Russell's recordings and produced several of them. According to a review of their collaboration in The New Yorker, “phrases emerge and wrap around each other: Peter Zummo’s gorgeous trombone motif, Russell’s pizzicato cello theme, and a growing drone of loud, dissonant guitars…When the smoke clears, genre is just a memory.”

Russell, in turn, played often for Zummo, notably on the Bessie Award–winning composition Lateral Pass, created for a dance by choreographer Trisha Brown, with a stage set by artist Nancy Graves. In 2014, Foom Music, in London, released an original recording of this 1985 piece. Said Piccadilly Records, the recording demonstrated that “Zummo’s signature trombone style, renowned for its rich and soothing tone, has become one of the most beloved features of Russell’s celebrated sound."

In 2014, Mikhail Barishnikov's Baryshnikov Arts Center, in New York City, awarded Zummo and bass player Ernie Brooks a residency for the creation of new work. Additional support over the years has come from the National Endowment for the Arts, the New York State Council on the Arts, Meet the Composer, the New York Foundation for the Arts, and other funders.

Zummo appears as himself in Jonathan Demme's Accumulation with Talking Plus Water Motor, a film featuring Trisha Brown, and in Wild Combination: A Portrait of Arthur Russell, a documentary by Matt Wolf. His reflections on working with Russell can be heard in a Roulette Intermedium interview. Zummo contributed to the score of Tramas, Italian director Augusto Contento's cinematic portrait of São Paulo, Brazil, worked with artist Donald Judd to realize a work accompanying Trisha Brown's choreography for Newark, and played for Andrei Șerban–Liz Swados collaborations, including Fragments of a Greek Trilogy.

Zummo performs for other bands and bandleaders, including the Lounge Lizards, Gods and Monsters, Stephen Gaboury’s B-Twist Orchestra for the dance company Ballets with a Twist, Go: Organic Orchestra, Tilt Brass, Downtown Ensemble, Flexible Orchestra, The Necessaries, and Dinosaur L. He has also played in units put together by composers David Behrman, Philip Corner, Guy De Bièvre, Tom Hamilton, William Hellerman, Annea Lockwood, Jackson MacLow, Ben Neill, Phill Niblock, Pauline Oliveros, Vernon Reid, Steve Swell, Yasunao Tone, Lise Vachon, Yoshi Wada, and others. Zummo performed on Teo Macero’s Fusion, which featured both the Lounge Lizards and the London Philharmonic Orchestra.

In addition to composing innumerable works for groups he has put together himself, Zummo has created compositions for others. Blue Headlights was written for live performance by New York Virtuoso Singers in 2023. In 2018, Italian musician and conductor Luciano Chessa performed Think Quick in Australia. Also that year, Second Spring, a movie by British director Andy Kelleher, premiered with a score by Zummo. In 1995, Guy Klucevsek's record Ain’t Nothin’ But A Polka Band featured Zummo's (the) Who Stole the Polka?.

== Education and training ==
After Zummo's early classical-music education in his hometown, Cleveland, Ohio, he earned bachelor’s and master’s degrees in music and composition at Wesleyan University, in Middletown, Connecticut. There he studied with Alvin Lucier, Ken McIntyre, Clifford Thornton, Daoud Haroon, Dick Griffin, and Sam Rivers, among others. After Wesleyan, Zummo moved to New York City, where he continued trombone studies with Carmine Caruso and Roswell Rudd and sought out the influences of James Fulkerson and Stuart Dempster.

In New York City, Zummo developed extended techniques for the trombone and other instruments and created many works, including numerous pieces with his wife, then-choreographer and dancer Stephanie Woodard. For several years, he wrote music and performance reviews in the SoHo Weekly News. For a 2006 article by “Blue” Gene Tyranny in Dram, Zummo described his compositional approach as being about “persons not instruments,” elaborating that he provides “material for musicians and sufficient instructions, so they don’t make arbitrary but rather logical or heartfelt decisions.” His work, Zummo continued, thus “engenders a social situation reflecting modern society.”

== Academic and other positions ==
Zummo has been a visiting artist at the Oberlin Conservatory of Music, Conservatoire National Supérieur de Musique et de Dance de Paris, and the Conservatory of Amsterdam, and Wesleyan University, among others. He was senior faculty advisor with the New York Arts Program, a New York City-based project of Ohio Wesleyan University and the Great Lakes Colleges Association, and artistic director of The Loris Bend Foundation, a nonprofit presenter of music, dance, and media.

== Selected discography ==
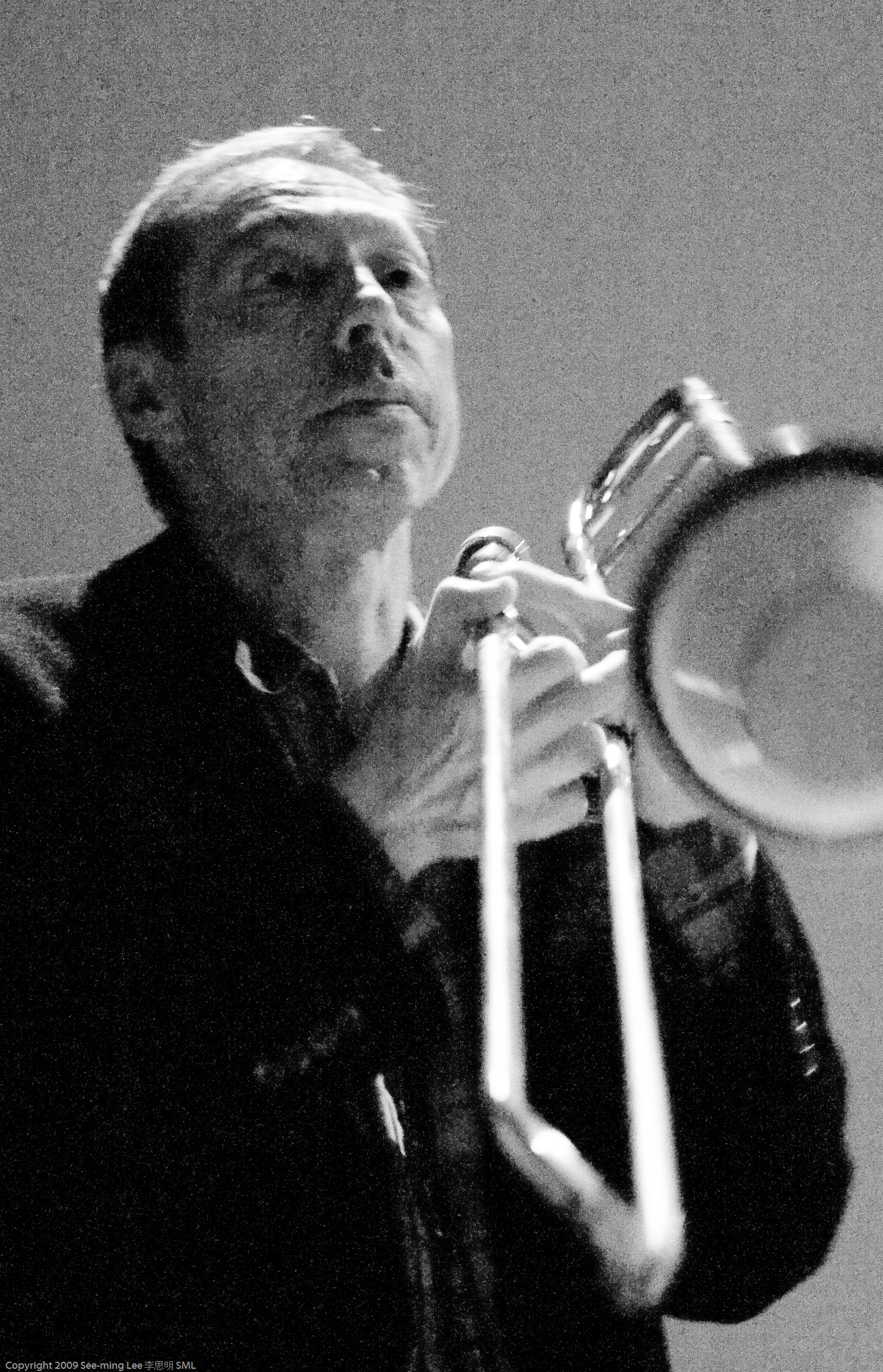
Zummo, Arthur’s Landing at the New Museum, 2009

Selected works:

=== Producer or co-producer ===
- Arthur’s Landing, by Arthur Russell, on Strut, 2011
- H*E*R – Songs About the Mysteries of Housework and Nature, by Yvette Perez (Massoudi), on Persian Cardinal, 2007
- Disco Not Disco, by Arthur Russell, on Strut, 2000
- Treehouse/School Bell, by Arthur Russell, on Sleeping Bag, 1986

=== Composer/performer ===
- Deep Drive 2+, on Unheard of Hope, an imprint of Tin Angel, 2023
- Tone Bone Kone, on Unheard of Hope, an imprint of Tin Angel, 2021
- Chord Fanfare (And You Can Decorate Your Helmet), in the compilation Wind Layers, on 7K, 2021
- Deep Drive, on Unheard of Hope, an imprint of Tin Angel, 2019
- Frame Loop, on Foom, 2018
- Dress Code, on Optimo, 2016
- Lateral Pass, on Foom, 2014
- Fast Dream, for the DownTown Ensemble's DownTown Only, on Lovely Music, 2001
- Slybersonic Tromosome, with Tom Hamilton, on Penumbra, 2000
- Experimenting with Household Chemicals, on XI, 1995
- Zummo with an X, on Loris Records, 1985, New World, 2006, and Optimo, 2012
- Travelers Through Days and Days, on the band Sunship's Into the Sun, on Capitol, 1974

=== Collaborator/performer ===
- Random Person, by Burner Herzog, on BC Studios, 2023
- Thought Sent Valley, with Tilman Robinson, in Duet Layers, on 7K, 2022
- Thinking a View, with Eddie Ruscha, on Fourth Sounds, 2022
- First Thought Best Thought, by Arthur Russell, on Audika, 2021
- What's Not Enough About That, with Bex Burch, on Vula Viel, 2020
- Watermelon Sun, with Tom Skinner and the band Hello Skinny, on Brownswood, 2017
- Tahdig, by Yvette (Perez) Massoudi, on Persian Cardinal, 2018
- Master Mix: Red Hot + Arthur Russell, by Red Hot Organization, on 2014
- Sonic Mandala, by Adam Rudolph and Go: Organic Orchestra, on Meta, 2013
- Can You Imagine…The Sound of a Dream, by Adam Rudolph and Go: Organic Orchestra, on Meta, 2011
- Winter Moon, by Heroes of Toolik, on Kennel Studio, 2012
- I Wake Up Screaming, by Kid Creole and the Coconuts, on Strut, 2011
- The Business of Here, by Steve Swell/The Nation of We, on Cadence Jazz, 2008
- H.E.R.—Songs About the Mysteries of Housework and Nature, with Yvette Perez (Massoudi), on Persian Cardinal, 2009
- Vocalise, by Lise Vachon, on Say No More, 2006
- My Dear Siegfried, by David Behrman, on XI, 2005
- Bending the Tonic (Twice), by Guy De Bièvre, on Canal Street, 2005
- Calling Out Of Context, by Arthur Russell, on Audika, 2004
- I Fly, by Yvette Perez (Massoudi), on Birdbrain, 2004
- Centrifugal Swing, by William McClelland's band The Feetwarmers, 2003
- Off-Hour Wait State, by Tom Hamilton, on Looking Glass Studios, 1996
- Another Thought, by Arthur Russell, on Point, 1994
- Thousand Year Dreaming, by Annea Lockwood, on Nonsequitur, 1993
- 100 of the World’s Most Beautiful Melodies, by Nicolas Collins, 1989
- Brooklyn, by Peter Gordon, on CBS, 1987
- Innocent, by Peter Gordon, on CBS, 1986
- Instrumentals, by Arthur Russell, on Crepuscule, 1984
- Live on the Drunken Boat, by the band The Lounge Lizards, on Europa, 1983
- Down by Law, John Lurie's soundtrack album, on Crammed Discs, 1987
- 24–24 Music, by Arthur Russell and the band Dinosaur L; on Sleeping Bag, 1981
- Big Sky, by the band The Necessaries, on Sire, 1981
