= 24→24 Music =

1981 album by Arthur Russell

Studio album by Dinosaur L
- Released: 1981
- Recorded: April–June 1979
- Studio: Blank Tapes, New York; The Kitchen, New York
- Genre: Disco; avant-garde disco
- Length: 29:10 (original LP); 51:14 (reissue CD)
- Label: Sleeping Bag (US)
- Producer: Arthur Russell

Singles from 24→24 Music
- 1. "Go Bang! #5 / Clean on Your Bean #1" Released: 1982

24→24 Music is a 1981 album by Dinosaur L, the disco project of American musician Arthur Russell. Enlisting a variety of musicians, Russell recorded the album in 1979 primarily at Blank Tapes studio in New York. It was released on Sleeping Bag Records, the label started by Russell and Will Socolov, and accompanied by the single "Go Bang! #5."

== Background ==
The album is an improvised composition grounded in disco but characterized by rhythmic shifts every 24 bars, with Russell running the recordings through two 24-track tape recorders set up by producer Bob Blank. The recording featured a large number of musicians, including the Ingram Brothers band. It was recorded at Blank Tapes studio in June 1979, with the exception of "#7," recorded in April at the New York avant-garde venue The Kitchen, where the material was initially performed. Steven Hall later described its first performance: "it was like really hot dance music and no one got it. The idea that Arthur would turn around and bring that music into their venue and present it as serious music was really very challenging to them, and very threatening to them."

== Release ==
The first limited pressing of this record had a hand-made silk-screened cover. Tracks from the album received significant airtime at New York clubs thanks to DJ Larry Levan, a friend of Russell.

The album was reissued on CD in 2007 with bonus tracks, and again as a box-set in 2011 featuring rare full-length remixes.

== Reception ==
Professional ratings
Review scores
Source	Rating
AllMusic	4.5/5 stars
Pitchfork	7.5/10
Record Collector	4/4 stars

AllMusic called the album Russell's "most delightful" work, and described it as exploring "the blurry hinterlands where disco, downtown avant improv, new music, and funk meet no wave playfulness." Following its reissue, Pitchfork stated that the album "falls in a long line of deserved reissues" of Russell's work, and called it "disco at its loosest, warmest, and weirdest". Melody Maker called it "a fluid, constantly shifting piece of music that’s intensely danceable and spacially disorientating at the same time."

== Track listing ==
All tracks are written by Arthur Russell.

Original LP tracklist
No.	Title	Length
1.	"#1 (You're Gonna Be Clean on Your Bean)"	3:53
2.	"#5 (Go Bang!)"	7:54
3.	"#2 (No, Thank You)"	1:26
4.	"#7"	1:46
5.	"#3 (In the Corn Belt)"	6:59
6.	"#6 (Get Set)"	7:12
Total length:		29:10

2007 reissue bonus tracks
No.	Title	Length
7.	"Clean on Your Bean #1"	6:35
8.	"#5 (Go Bang!) (Francois K Mix)"	7:34
9.	"Go Bang! (Thank You Arthur Edit)"	8:51
10.	"In the Corn Belt (Larry Levan Mix)"	5:54
Total length:		51:14

== Personnel ==
Credits adapted from liner notes.

- Arthur Russell – cello (pizz), vocals
- Wilbur Bascomb – bass
- Mustafa Ahmed – congas (track 4)
- Jeff Berman – drums (track 4)
- Rik Albani – trumpet
- Julius Eastman – vocals, keyboards
- Peter Gordon – tenor saxophone
- Kent Goshorn – vocals
- Butch Ingram – bass
- Jimmy Ingram – keyboards
- John Ingram – drums
- Timmy Ingram – congas
- William Ingram – guitar
- Jill Kroesen – vocals
- Marie-Chantal Martin – vocals
- Denise Mercedes – guitar
- Rome Neal – percussion, vocals
- Larry Saltzman – guitar (track 4)
- Ed Tomney – guitar
- Peter Zummo – trombone

Production

- Arthur Russell – production
- Peter Gordon – production (track 1)
- Ray Janos – mastering
- Mark Grafe – engineer
- Janos – lacquer cut
