= Arthur Russell =

American cellist, composer, producer, singer, and musician (1951–1992)

Background information
- Also known as: Loose Joints; Dinosaur; Dinosaur L; Indian Ocean; Killer Whale; Jigmé; In The Corn Belt
- Born: Charles Arthur Russell Jr. May 21, 1951; Oskaloosa, Iowa, U.S.
- Died: April 4, 1992 (aged 40) New York City, U.S.
- Genres: Avant-garde; mutant disco; art pop; minimalist; folk; new wave
- Occupations: Composer; producer; singer
- Instruments: Cello; keyboards; guitar; drums; programming
- Years active: 1973–1992
- Labels: Sire; West End; Les Disques du Crépuscule; Rough Trade; Point; Orange Mountain; Audika
- Website: audikarecords.bandcamp.com

Charles Arthur Russell Jr. (May 21, 1951 – April 4, 1992) was an American cellist, composer, producer, singer, and musician from Iowa, whose work spanned a range of styles. After studying contemporary composition and Indian classical music in California, Russell relocated to New York City in the mid-1970s, where he became involved in Lower Manhattan's avant-garde community and later the city's burgeoning disco scene. His eclectic music was often marked by adventurous production choices and his soft tenor vocals.

Russell worked as musical director of the New York avant-garde venue The Kitchen in 1974 and 1975, but later embraced dance music, producing or co-producing several underground club hits under names such as Dinosaur L, Loose Joints, and Indian Ocean between 1978 and 1988. He co-founded the independent label Sleeping Bag Records with Will Socolov in 1981, and collaborated with a wide variety of artists, including musicians Peter Gordon, Peter Zummo, and Talking Heads, DJs such as Walter Gibbons, Nicky Siano, and Steve D'Acquisto; and poet Allen Ginsberg.

The only full-length studio albums Russell issued under his name were the orchestral recording Tower of Meaning (1983) and vocal LP World of Echo (1986); he also released the disco LP 24→24 Music (1981) under his Dinosaur L alias. Over the last two decades of his life, he amassed a large collection of unreleased and unfinished recordings, in part due to his perfectionist working tendencies. He died from AIDS-related illnesses in 1992, still in relative obscurity and poverty.

Russell's profile rose in the 21st century owing to a series of musical releases (including collections of previously unreleased material) and biographical works. Several posthumous compilations of his music were released, including The World of Arthur Russell (2004) and Calling Out of Context (2004). The documentary Wild Combination: A Portrait of Arthur Russell was released in 2008.

== Early life ==
Russell was born and raised in Oskaloosa, Iowa; his father was a former naval officer who eventually served as mayor of the small city. As a child and adolescent, he studied the cello and piano and began to compose his own music. When he was 18 he moved to San Francisco, where he lived in a Buddhist commune led by Neville G. Pemchekov Warwick. After earning his high school equivalency, he studied North Indian classical music at the Ali Akbar College of Music and Western composition part-time at the San Francisco Conservatory of Music. He met Allen Ginsberg, with whom he began to work, accompanying him on the cello as a soloist or in groups while Ginsberg sang or read his poetry.

== Career ==
=== 1973–1975: Early years in New York and The Kitchen ===
In 1973, Russell moved to New York and enrolled in a formal degree program at the Manhattan School of Music, cross-registering in electronic music and linguistics classes at Columbia University. While studying at the conservatory, Russell repeatedly clashed with Pulitzer Prize-winning serialist composer and instructor Charles Wuorinen, who disparaged the composition "City Park" (a minimalist, non-narrative suite incorporating readings from the works of Ezra Pound and Gertrude Stein) as "the most unattractive thing I've ever heard".

Embittered by his experience, Russell briefly considered transferring to Dartmouth College at the behest of experimental composer Christian Wolff, whom he had sought out and befriended upon arriving in the Northeast. But after a chance meeting at a Wolff concert in Manhattan, he became close with Rhys Chatham, who arranged for Russell to succeed him as music director of The Kitchen, a downtown avant-garde performance space. As a result, he abandoned his studies and remained in New York. Russell and Chatham later briefly roomed together in a sixth-story walkup apartment at 437 East 12th Street in the East Village; Ginsberg (who maintained his primary residence in the building from 1975 to 1996 and helped Russell secure the apartment) supplied electricity to the impoverished composers through an extension cord. Russell resided in the apartment for the rest of his life. During his tenure at The Kitchen (from the autumn of 1974 to the summer of 1975), he greatly expanded the breadth and purview of the venue's offerings, crafting a program that "support[ed] other local and relatively low profile composers rather than... accentuat[ing] the work of composers who were beginning to acquire an international reputation." This approach elicited controversy when Russell booked Boston-based proto-punk band The Modern Lovers for an engagement at the venue, widely regarded as a leading bastion of minimalism. Russell's booking of Fluxus stalwart Henry Flynt's "punkabilly" ensemble Nova'billy, concluding his season as director, was likewise unsettling to the avant-garde establishment. According to biographer Tim Lawrence, "the decision to program the Modern Lovers and Talking Heads was Russell's way of demonstrating that minimalism could be found outside of compositional music, as well as his belief that pop music could be arty, energetic and fun at the same time."

From 1975 to 1979, Russell was a member of The Flying Hearts, recorded by John Hammond, which consisted of Russell (keyboards/vocals), ex-Modern Lovers member Ernie Brooks (bass/vocals), Larry Saltzman (guitar), and David Van Tieghem (drums, vocals); a later incarnation in the 1980s included Joyce Bowden (vocals) and Jesse Chamberlain (drums). This ensemble was frequently augmented in live and studio performances by the likes of Chatham, David Byrne, Jon Gibson, Peter Gordon, Jerry Harrison, Garrett List (who succeeded Russell as musical director of The Kitchen), Andy Paley, Lenny Pickett and Peter Zummo. During the same period, various permutations of this ensemble, together with Glenn Iamaro, Bill Ruyle and Jon Sholle, performed & recorded excerpts from Instrumentals, a 48-hour-long orchestral work that constituted Russell's first major work in the idiom. Selections from the Instrumentals sessions were eventually collected on an eponymously titled album, released by Belgian label Disques du Crepuscule in 1984. The collaboration among Russell (once again as a keyboardist), Brooks, and Chamberlain extended into The Necessaries, a power pop quartet fronted by guitarist Ed Tomney. Their lone 1981 album on Sire Records (initially released as Big Sky before being tweaked and re-released as Event Horizon) featured few songwriting contributions from Russell, who abruptly left the band at the approach to the Holland Tunnel before an important concert in Washington, D.C.

=== 1976–1980: Discovery of disco and early singles ===
In 1976, Russell was in talks to join Talking Heads, who were a trio at the time. He recorded an acoustic version of the song "Psycho Killer" with the band, playing cello. He would also collaborate on arrangements for early Talking Heads songs. He stated that they became friends but he "ended up not joining the band. They were all from art school and were into looking severe and cool. I was never into that. I was from music school and I had long hair at the time."

Around 1976, Russell became a habitue of New York's nascent underground disco scene, namely Nicky Siano's Gallery on Houston Street in SoHo. In a 2007 interview with Wax Poetics magazine, Siano downplayed the popular myth that Russell's interest in the genre solidified over the course of a single night, noting that "Louis [Aquilone, Siano's best friend and Russell's then-lover] was at the Gallery every single Saturday night. After spending a few Saturday nights without Louis, Arthur decided to come. After the third or fourth time there, he started to come without Louis". Though an eager dancer, Siano has described Russell's style as "strange... outrageous, weird... he was definitely a 'white-boy' dancer." By the time Russell was involved with Tom Lee in the 1980s, his nightlife activities had subsided to a large extent. "It wasn't like Arthur and I were in some gay disco world, getting dressed to go out to the club and dancing the night away," Lee has said. "We'd go to CBGB, we'd go to Max's Kansas City, we'd go to Tier 3 but we'd listen to the group and then go home. For him it was about the daily grind of actually playing music."

In 1977, trenchantly attracted to the minimalist rhythms of disco and funded by Siano's "Gallery war chest", Russell wrote and co-produced "Kiss Me Again" in collaboration with a diverse array of musicians—Flynt, Zummo, Byrne (on rhythm guitar) and Gloria Gaynor veterans Wilbur Bascomb (bass) and Alan Schwartzberg (drums)—under the moniker of Dinosaur L. The first disco single to be released by Sire Records, it was a fairly large club hit, reportedly selling "some ungodly amount, like two hundred thousand copies". Despite the modicum of commercial success and "ecstatic reaction" elicited by the record in the New York underground, according to Siano, "Ray Caviano [head of Warner/Sire's disco division] never really pushed it," and the record failed to cross over into the mainstream. The song's main hook was interpolated by Desmond Child (who was acquainted with Russell via Larry Salzman) on his minor 1979 hit "Our Love Is Insane," leading Russell to accuse the musician of infringement among his friends. Although the duo was signed to Sire to produce a follow-up single featuring Gerri Griffin of the Voices of East Harlem, the sessions stalled because of Siano's burgeoning drug habit (leading him to take temporary refuge in California) and Russell's myopic approach to recording.

In 1980, Loose Joints (initially known as the Little All-Stars) was formed with Russell, onetime DJ Steve D'Acquisto, Columbia student and Russell confidante Steven Hall, three singers found on The Loft's dancefloor, miscellaneous other musicians, and the Ingram Brothers rhythm section (best known for later backing Patti LaBelle). With a stated ambition to create "the disco white album", the group—under contract to leading underground disco label West End Records—recorded hours of music but only released three songs: "Is It All Over My Face", "Pop Your Funk" (in two disparate arrangements, including a no wave-influenced single edit), and "Tell You Today". D'Acquisto, a non-musician who favored such extemporaneous touches as off-key singing and the input of street buskers, repeatedly clashed with the perfectionist Russell throughout the sessions. Despite the acrimony, Hall felt that "D'Acquisto allowed shy Arthur to come out of his shell in the gayest sense. He also taught him how to let go in terms of slavishly and clairvoyantly searching for and then locking in the groove." The experimental recordings bemused many of downtown New York's disco cognoscenti, including West End head Mel Cheren and Loft proprietor David Mancuso, a predicament that led Larry Levan to remix "Is It All Over My Face" for club play; the ensuing track, based around a female vocal wiped from the original mix (and recorded on stolen studio time with Francois Kevorkian as an uncredited co-mixer) was an enduring staple of Levan's sets at the Paradise Garage and a formative influence on Chicago house, in addition to becoming a bona fide commercial hit in the New York area via airplay on WBLS.

In 1981, Russell and entrepreneur Will Socolov (who partially financed the Loose Joints sessions) founded Sleeping Bag Records. Their first release was a recording of 24→24 Music, a controversial disco-influenced composition (with rhythmic shifts every 24 bars, hence the title) that had been commissioned by and first performed at The Kitchen in 1979. The first limited pressing of this record had a hand made silk-screened cover. Steven Hall later described its debut as "the best performance of Arthur's work that I ever attended... it was like really hot dance music and no one got it. The idea that Arthur would turn around and bring that [dance] music into their venue and present it as serious music was really very challenging to them, and very threatening to them." "Go Bang," originally released on this album but recorded three years earlier by an ensemble that included Zummo, Peter Gordon, academic/composer Julius Eastman, Bascomb, and John and Jimmy Ingram was remixed as a 12" single by Francois Kevorkian. Kevorkian's remix of "Go Bang" and Levan's remix of "In the Cornbelt" (another track from the 24→24 suite) were frequently played at the Paradise Garage.

=== 1983–1986: Further collaborations and World of Echo ===
Russell continued to release dance singles such as "Tell You Today" (4th and Broadway, 1983), an upbeat dance groove and Loose Joints holdover featuring the vocals of Joyce Bowden. Additional releases that followed included "Wax the Van" (Jump Street, 1987) and "I Need More" (Vinylmania, 1988), which paired Russell with erstwhile James Brown foil Lola Blank (then married to Bob Blank, Russell's preferred studio engineer); the Peter Zummo collaboration "School Bell/Treehouse" (Sleeping Bag, 1986); and "Let's Go Swimming" (Upside/Rough Trade, 1986), which anticipated later developments in tech house and was Russell's only dance single to be released under his own name. The latter two records were remixed by legendary 70s-era DJ Walter Gibbons, who had renounced his career for evangelical Christianity and was employed as a buyer at Rock and Soul Records in Midtown. Despite Gibbons's religious predilections, the two forged a dependable (if occasionally tempestuous) working relationship. Further Gibbons/Russell collaborations include "C-Thru" (a dance version of "See Through" on World of Echo that remained unreleased until 2010) and a remix of Russell's "Calling All Kids" (eventually released on the 2004 compilation Calling out of Context).

At the same time, the album Tower of Meaning (Chatham Square, 1983) was released in a limited pressing on Philip Glass's private label. The recording was made up of incidental music intended to accompany director Robert Wilson's staging of Medea, a partnership arranged by Glass. Although widely perceived as an important breakthrough for Russell in the compositional world, creative squabbling between the downtown luminaries culminated in Wilson barring the composer from attending rehearsals and eventually ousting Russell from the project altogether in favor of British composer Gavin Bryars. The "compelling and meditative recording", conducted by Julius Eastman, represents just a fragment of Russell's score, which includes voices along with its instrumentation. While Russell tangentially remained affiliated with the new music sphere in New York until his death, continuing to perform in solo and group configurations at The Kitchen and Experimental Intermedia Foundation, Tower of Meaning was his final orchestral effort.

The rejection of Russell's Corn album (an eclectic suite of material centered around hip-hop-infused electropop, including several tracks later released on Calling Out of Context; other songs were eventually released under the album's original moniker in 2015) by Socolov in 1985, coupled with creative disagreements between the two over "Wax the Van", resulted in Russell divesting himself from Sleeping Bag Records shortly after the release of "Schoolbell/Treehouse" in 1986. According to Bob Blank in a followup to an Internet reposting of the (purportedly fallacious) 1986 article that detailed the subterfuge, Socolov "wanted to take the label to 'another level".

During the mid-1980s, Russell gave many performances, either accompanying himself on cello with a myriad of effects, or working with a small ensemble consisting of Steven Hall, Ernie Brooks, Peter Zummo, percussionist Mustafa Ahmed, and composer Elodie Lauten.

September 1986 saw the release of World of Echo (Upside/Rough Trade, 1986). Heralded as "a magnum opus of sorts" by contemporary critics, it incorporated many of his ideas for pop, dance and classical music for both solo and cello format. The album was well-reviewed in Britain and included in Melody Maker's "Top Thirty Releases of 1986", but failed commercially.

Russell also collaborated with a number of choreographers, including John Bernd, Diane Madden, Alison Salzinger, Stephanie Woodard, and Charles Moulton. He was also honored with a posthumous Bessie Award in 1993.

=== 1986–1992: Later work, illness, and death ===
Shortly after the release of World of Echo, Russell was diagnosed as HIV-positive. Though the disease caused throat cancer (forcing Russell to undergo chemotherapy), he remained prolific, working on voice-and-cello songs for an album to be released by Philip Glass's Point Music (some of which surfaced on the posthumous Another Thought in 1994) and an electronic pop album (influenced by the likes of 808 State and provisionally titled 1-800-Dinosaur) for Rough Trade Records. Much of the material intended for this project was included on 2004's Calling Out of Context. Although Russell reportedly planned to submit the album in the summer of 1987, he continued tinkering with potential songs for another four years. According to Rough Trade founder Geoff Travis, "It was frustrating, but I knew he needed my support to keep financing his music."

Russell died of AIDS-related illnesses on April 4, 1992, at the age of 40. In an April 28 column, Kyle Gann of The Village Voice wrote: "His recent performances had been so infrequent due to illness, his songs were so personal, that it seems as though he simply vanished into his music."

Russell was prolific, but was also notorious for leaving songs unfinished and continually revising his music. Ernie Brooks said Russell "never arrived at a completed version of anything." Peter Gordon stated, "his quest wasn't really to do a finished product but more to do with exploring his different ways of working musically." He left behind more than 1,000 tapes when he died, 40 of them different mixes of one song. According to Russell archivist Steve Knutson, the musician's estate consists of around 800 reels of 2" and ¼" tape, "another few hundred cassettes, several dozen DAT tapes, hundreds and hundreds of pages of song lyrics and poetry".

== Personal life ==
As a young adult, Russell led a seemingly heterosexual lifestyle; at least two of these relationships (with Muriel Fujii in San Francisco and later Sydney Murray in New York) have been substantiated. He incorporated Buddhist philosophy in his music.

Although he had a brief fling with Allen Ginsberg in 1973, Russell did not begin dating men until becoming involved with hairdresser Louis Aquilone in 1976. After the relationship with Aquilone dissolved, Russell dated Donald Murk (who subsequently became Russell's manager) for several years. As this relationship drew to a close, Russell became acquainted with silkscreen operator Tom Lee; their friendship rapidly evolved into a domestic partnership.

Although Russell continued to see other men and women, their partnership endured until his death in 1992. Lee, who became a schoolteacher and continued to reside in the couple's rent-controlled East Village apartment until February 2011, is the executor of Russell's estate. Their relationship is detailed at length in Matt Wolf's Wild Combination: A Portrait of Arthur Russell.

== Legacy and influence ==
Though never achieving great success during his lifetime, Russell has been acknowledged as an important influence on a variety of musical developments and artists in recent years. In 2004, Stylus described him as "criminally overlooked for far too long" and "a genius—never to be recognized in his own time, but to be enjoyed by generations to come." PopMatters noted "the contributions Russell made to the disparate genres of dance, disco, dub, and experimental music" and wrote that "his absolute fearlessness in lending his own unique style to even the most unlikely sound combinations is peerless." Vice noted that he "never settled on one genre of music [...] He made winsome country and hypersexual disco and delicate art pop," while drifting through the downtown rock and classical scenes of New York. Bandcamp Daily credited him with "spanning and shaping sounds as far afield as disco, minimalism, avant-garde, new wave, and folk-pop." AllMusic stated that his eclectic music was marked by adventurous production choices and his distinctive singing, described by The New York Times as "soft tenor vocals." Pitchfork called Russell "a changeling artist whose only parallel might be Miles Davis, constantly placing his individual sound in new contexts, constantly searching."

Artists who have cited Russell as an influence include FKA twigs, Dev Hynes, The Lemon Twigs and James Murphy. James Blake named his club night and record label after Russell's provisionally titled album "1-800-Dinosaur". Planningtorock covered Russell's song "Janine" on their album W in 2011, and former Everything But The Girl singer Tracey Thorn covered "Get Around to It" on her 2007 solo album Out of the Woods. A tribute EP, Four Songs by Arthur Russell, curated by Jens Lekman, was released in 2007 through Rough Trade Records. In 2014 the HIV/AIDS focused Red Hot Organization released a tribute triple LP compilation, Master Mix: Red Hot + Arthur Russell, included artists Jose Gonzalez, Robyn, Hot Chip, Sufjan Stevens and Devendra Banhart among others. In 2015 Red Hot presented Red Hot + Arthur Russell Live featuring musicians and songs from the tribute at Brooklyn Academy of Music's Howard Gilman Opera House for two nights. In 2016, rapper Kanye West released a track titled "30 Hours" which prominently samples Russell's "Answers Me." In 2018, American musician and composer Peter Broderick released the compilation album Peter Broderick & Friends Play Arthur Russell containing cover versions of songs written by Russell.

Filmmaker Matt Wolf completed a feature-length documentary on Russell called Wild Combination: A Portrait of Arthur Russell. It premiered at the Berlin International Film Festival on February 13, 2008. Tim Lawrence, an author and academic at the University of East London, has written a biography of Russell, titled Hold On to Your Dreams: Arthur Russell and the Downtown Music Scene, published in 2009. BBC Radio 4 broadcast a documentary "Arthur Russell: Vanished into Music" on September 27, 2016. The album Tower of Meaning was re-released in 2016 on Audika Records, while material of the album was performed live by the London Contemporary Orchestra in January 2017. In 2023, poet charles theonia published a long-form work entitled Gay Heaven Is a Dance Floor but I Can't Relax dedicated to Russell, through Archway Editions.

== Discography ==
=== Studio albums ===
==== Solo albums ====
- Tower of Meaning (1983, Chatham Square)
- World of Echo (1986, Upside Records/Rough Trade)

==== as Dinosaur L ====
- 24→24 Music (1982, Sleeping Bag Records)

==== With The Necessaries ====
- Big Sky (1981, Sire Records)
- Event Horizon (1982, Sire Records)

=== Compilation albums and EPs ===
- Instrumentals (1974 – Volume 2) (1984, Another Side)
- Another Thought (1994, Point Music)
- The World of Arthur Russell (2004, Soul Jazz Records)
- Calling Out of Context (2004, Audika Records)
- First Thought Best Thought (2006, Audika Records)
- Springfield EP (2006, Audika Records)
- Love Is Overtaking Me (2008, Audika Records/Rough Trade)
- Master Mix: Red Hot + Arthur Russell (2014, Red Hot/Yep Roc)
- Corn (2015, Audika Records)
- Iowa Dream (2019, Audika Records)
- Picture of Bunny Rabbit (2023, Audika Records)

=== Live albums ===
- Sketches for World of Echo: June 25, 1984, Live at EI (2020, Audika Records)
- The Deer in the Forest: March 2, 1985, Live at Roulette (2020, Audika Records)
- 24 to 24 Music Live at the Kitchen (2021, Audika Records) Recorded live April 28, 1979.
- Open Vocal Phrases Where Songs Come In and Out (Live 12/20/85) (2025, Audika Records) Recorded live a EI.

=== Singles ===
- Dinosaur: "Kiss Me Again" (1978). Sire Records. Vocals by Myriam Valle. Produced by Arthur Russell & Nicky Siano.
- Loose Joints: "Is It All Over My Face" (1980). West End Records. Produced by Arthur Russell & Steve D'Acquisto.
- Loose Joints: "Pop Your Funk" (1980). West End Records. Produced by Arthur Russell & Steve D'Acquisto.
- Dinosaur L: "Go Bang" / "Clean on Your Bean #1" (1982). Sleeping Bag Records. Vocals by Lola Blank, Arthur Russell, and Julius Eastman.
- Loose Joints: "Tell You (Today)" (1983). 4th and Broadway. Vocals by Joyce Bowden. Produced by Killer Whale (Russell) & Steve D'Acquisto.
- Clandestine feat. Ned Sublette: "Radio Rhythm (S-I-G-N-A-L S-M-A-R-T)" (1984). Sleeping Bag Records. Vocals by Ned Subtlette. Produced by Killer Whale and Ned Sublette.
- Felix: "Tiger Stripes" / "You Can't Hold Me Down" (1984). Sleeping Bag Records. Vocals by Maxine Bell. Produced by Killer Whale & Nicky Siano.
- Indian Ocean: "School Bell/Treehouse" (1986). Sleeping Bag Records (US) / 4th and Broadway (UK). Produced by Arthur Russell & Peter Zummo.
- Arthur Russell: "Let's Go Swimming" (1986). Logarythm (US) / Rough Trade (UK). Produced by Arthur Russell & Mark Freedman. Edited by Killer Whale.
- Lola (Lola Blank): "Wax the Van" (1987). Jump Street Records. Vocals by Lola Blank. Produced by Bob and Lola Blank.
- Lola (Lola Blank): "I Need More" (1988). Vinylmania. Vocals by Lola Blank. Produced by Bob and Lola Blank.
- Arthur Russell: "Springfield" (2006). Audika Records. Includes a remix by The DFA.

=== Mixes and edits ===
- Sounds of JHS 126 Brooklyn: "Chill Pill" (1984). Sleeping Bag Records. "Under Water Mix" by Killer Whale.
- Bonzo Goes to Washington (Bootsy Collins and Jerry Harrison): "Five Minutes" (1984). Sleeping Bag Records. "R-R-R Radio" and "B-B-B Bombing" mixes "chopped and channeled" by Arthur Russell.
