= Maestro (2003 film) =

2003 American documentary film

- Directed by: Josell Ramos
- Written by: Josell Ramos
- Produced by: Josell Ramos
- Starring: Francis Grasso; François K; Frankie Knuckles; Larry Levan; David Mancuso
- Narrated by: Lawrence Kennibrew; Josell Ramos; Scott Sterling
- Cinematography: Josell Ramos; Michael Sampson
- Edited by: Josell Ramos; Eric Moorman; Sara Kraushaar
- Music by: Raw Habits; Jephté Guillaume; Antonio Ocasio; Michael Cole
- Production companies: Artrution; Door A
- Release dates: February 15, 2002 (Spain); April 18, 2003 (England); March 12, 2004 (United States)
- Running time: 89 minutes
- Country: United States
- Language: English

Maestro is an American documentary film written, directed, filmed, edited, and produced by Josell Ramos. It details the rise of the house music clubs of the 1970s in New York City, covering how the AIDS epidemic affected both patrons and owners, and was the only full-length documentary film prior to 2016 covering the Paradise Garage.

After premiering at the inaugural In-edit Festival, the film toured the European film festival circuit in 2002. In 2003, it screened at North by Northeast as well as being released at cinemas in the United Kingdom. It played in United States cinemas in limited release in 2004.

It was released on DVD on July 26, 2005, together with a CD soundtrack containing twelve tracks in the US and fourteen tracks in Italy.

The New York City AIDS Memorial included Maestro as a topic of discussion in episode three: "Music is Life" in the "A Time to Listen" segment of "Hear Me: Voices of the Epidemic" in December 2020. The film was also used by Ira Sachs as one of the materials of study for the cast of The Man I Love.

== Synopsis ==
Maestro begins with text cards that explain the era for the film. Several venues are named – Malcolm's, Andre's, Uncle Charlie's, Buttermilk Bottoms, The Gilded Grape, The Firehouse, and The Continental Baths – as locales where dance music culture began. A voice over begins as the text cards fade describing the feeling of the clubs and the sentiment of their patrons.

It moves to the Paradise Garage, showing clips of dancers inside, the empty crystal room, then the lines outside. Various people speak regarding patronage at the garage, specifically with respect to Larry Levan as a DJ. Nicky Siano talks about meeting Levan through Frankie Knuckles. Patricia Field speaks about the construction parties at the Garage. David Lasada and Shamako Blackmon talk about how the Garage began. Patrons of both The Loft and the Garage talk about how the Black and Latino gays would patronize the clubs following the Stonewall riots. Mel Cheren mentions how the Garage helped teens deal with their stress.

A text card explains that Loft membership required a recommendation. David Mancuso says the Loft was private. Freddie Taylor, noted as the first female DJ at the Loft, states that the Loft created the sound structure but that the Garage gets the credit because Mancuso didn't care about the commercialization. Mancuso explains that he believes in social progress that comes from mixing economic groups. Steve D'Acquisto comes on with a voice over to say how Mancuso went to court regarding New York's insistence on a cabaret license.

Another text card appears, stating that Francis Grasso entered the club scene in the 1960s. Grasso and D'Acquisto mention that they didn't have headphones in those days, so they would read the grooves on an LP record. D'Acquisto states that The Sanctuary's patrons were "the show" while the Loft's location was "the party." He also mentions the light system employed to detail the location of police officers with respect to the clubs. Louis Kee calls the Loft a house party, and a text card on screen notes that the Loft was a haven for dancers before breakdancing.

A narrator comments that the Garage was the only place playing Chicago house music. Taylor explains that the mix wasn't the main point, but rather the storytelling and matching emotions. She goes on to say that Mancuso originally created the garage house sound, and that Siano and Levan created their own style of it. Field talks about Levan's style. Bob Blank talks about Levan's skills as well as working with Salsoul Records, who brought in Walter Gibbons. A text card states that Gibbons pioneered the extended mix as well as influencing twelve-inch single progression. Blank goes on to talk about Tee Scott and how he was one of the few Black remix artists in the 1970s. He says that Scott influenced Levan, and that the two of them brought a unique perspective.

Boyd Jarvis says Levan was one of the most creative DJs he has known when it came to selecting the music, and that the twelve-inch grew in popularity because of the Garage and how Levan would play a record over several weeks as he mixed it with others. John Jellybean Benitez states that the twelve-inch could make a record a hit, and mentions that their sound was superior to a 45 record. Gregory Gray indicates that CDs are inferior. Tom Moulton describes technicalities of the difference in the effect of CDs versus the twelve inch. Little Louie Vega, Danny Tenaglia, and Robert Clivillés each comment on how the twelve inch changed how music was presented. Vega mentions how it allowed for more audio equalization and effects.

A Garage patron mentions that he initially had difficulty accepting the atmosphere at the club because of his own homophobia. Another patron comments that there was tension between heterosexuals and homosexuals at some of the parties, to the point that club management would have to separate them. Billie says that Levan brought people together regardless of their cultural background, sexual orientation, or gender. Knuckles says that the clubs provided a place for people to share their passion, which he notes is easier "now" due to wider acceptance, but at the height of the club era it was much more difficult.

A text card appears noting the next segment will be about Stonewall, 1969. D'Acquisto notes that two men were not allowed to dance together in New York City. Grasso states that the police would find an excuse to come into the clubs when DJs changed over, with D'Acquisto adding that the cops would "beat you up" to get it. Grasso adds that the cops would enter the clubs "so that they could break heads." D'Acquisto notes that Stonewall changed some things, that the Sandtrap, the Haven, the Tamburlaine, Limelight, Le Jardin, Hollywood, the Gallery, the Loft, the Garage, all came into being after Stonewall.

François K talks about his memory of a time that someone on the stage at one of the clubs warned patrons that the illicit drugs and unprotected sex were a guarantee for contracting the then-unnamed HIV. He goes on to say that it saddened him, seeing how little attention the crowd paid to the warning, and that the disease claimed lives quickly. He notes that AIDS decimated an entire generation of its creative talent. Footage of Keith Haring dancing at the Garage is played. A photo of Michael Brody the founder of Paradise Garage, is shown. David Depino mentions how Brody looked fine when he would appear at the Garage, but one day he called everyone who worked there into the office and announced that they were closing. Depino states he doesn't believe Brody thought he was dying, simply that he was fatigued. He adds that Brody closed down the Garage because he didn't want to leave it to an unknown future in someone else's hands.

Knuckles mentions that Levan would come to The Sound Factory in the last two years of his life, recalling that Levan once said that he would have appreciated getting his big break better at that time than he did when it happened a decade earlier. The scene shifts to Blackmon saying that Levan came to his house for money to support his drug habit and Blackmon realized something was wrong. He goes on to say that people assumed for a time that Levan had taken his own life with an overdose. Lasada comments that Levan once told him he wanted to stop taking drugs, but Levan ended the conversation by announcing he was going to get high. Billie comes back on to say that she was surprised to see Levan with "regular people," that it seemed Levan didn't want people to see him at the end.

Knuckles comes on to say that Levan is one of the two biggest influences on why he chose his career, even crediting Levan with making deejaying into a career. Footage of Levan dancing both on the floor and in the DJ booth as he's mixing records plays over an instrumental piece. The scene shifts to the streets of New York, outside the Houston Street station, before shifting to footage of Levan at the turntables on the Garage's closing night. It then shows several DJs of the late 90s.

A final text card notes Levan's, Grasso's and D'Acquisto's deaths.

== Cast ==
In alphabetical order, all as self:

- Albert Assoon
- John Jellybean Benitez
- Billie
- Shamako Blackmon
- Bob Blank
- Bobby & Steve
- Frankie Bones
- Archie Burnett
- Maria Cameron
- Kenny Carpenter
- Mel Cheren
- Joe Claussell
- Robert Clivillés
- Claudio Coccoluto
- Robert Coleman
- Steve D'Acquisto
- David Depino
- Dimitri from Paris
- Benji Espinoza
- Fabrice
- Fantastic Plastic Machine
- Patricia Field
- Yukihiro Fukutomi
- Jose Garcia
- Kenny "Dope" Gonzalez
- Francis Grasso
- Gregory Gray
- Keith Haring
- Tony Humphries
- Ivan Iacobucci
- Boyd Jarvis
- François K
- Louis Kee
- Frankie Knuckles
- Danny Krivit
- David Lasada
- Larry Levan
- Craig Loftis
- Richard Long
- David Mancuso
- Joey Mandona
- Derrick May
- Angel Mendez
- Mr. Mike
- Tom Moulton
- Alex Neri
- Nori
- Antonio Ocasio
- Mark Oliver
- José Padilla
- Ralf
- Danny Rampling
- Alex Rosner
- Evelyn Santos
- Tee Scott
- Nicky Siano
- Smokin' Jo
- Mike Stone
- Jusong Sun
- Freddie Taylor
- Danny Tenaglia
- Alan Thompson
- Pete Tong
- Jackie Vargas
- Sven Väth
- "Little Louie" Vega

== Production ==
The film grew out of a half hour television piece Ramos had been writing on the underground music scene in 1997, and took more than four years to make. Ramos stated that they garnered trust among the house music scene by conveying the truth of its history. The footage of Keith Haring, for example, came from Michael Sampson, a former roommate of Levan's, and it took Ramos two years to gain his trust to be able to include it.

Maestro had three different subtitles: "The Origins of Dance Music Culture," "Larry Levan and early DJ culture," and "Larry Levan and the Paradise Garage." Lawrence Kennibrew narrated the opening sequence, with Ramos narrating the blue scene after François K's appearance. Scott Sterling provided the soprano.

Artrution Productions and Door A served as production companies for the film. Editors for the film were Ramos, Eric Moorman, and Sara Kraushaar. Much of Maestro's footage consists of Super 8 film, 16 mm film, and digital camcorder sequences. The film is presented with some segments in color and others in black and white.

Antonio Ocasio served as the music director for the film, along with composing original pieces to complement the vintage tracks used. Jephté Guillaume and Michael Cole also created original music pieces for the documentary, along with Raw Habits.

In addition to editing and narration, Ramos also wrote, directed, and produced the film, as well as handling the cinematography. With respect to the camera, Ramos said that the lighting and camera choices in the film were made in an effort to keep interviewees from feeling self-conscious. He also stated that he intentionally edited it so that the audience received the information non-linearly.

== Themes ==
While there had been documentaries on dance music made in the 1990s, Maestro was the first to center on the movement in New York City in the 1960s and 1970s. It was the only full-length documentary film covering the Paradise Garage through 2016. Maestro focused on the culture inside the clubs as well as surrounding Levan himself, and Ira Sachs used the film to help prepare his cast in his 2026 film The Man I Love due to its coverage of the New York club scene.

The film also spends time covering the AIDS epidemic and its effect on the underground club scene, both patrons and owners. The New York City AIDS Memorial included Maestro as a topic of discussion in the third episode, "Music is Life" in their 2020 "A Time to Listen" segment of "Hear Me: Voices of the Epidemic."

Ramos focused on telling the story of the origin of the house music genre from a Black, Latino and gay perspective. Maestro was criticized for not including The Saint or Fire Island clubs, and for concentrating on the Garage and the Loft, which had a largely minority clientele.

== Release ==
In September 2001, when announcing a preview screening for the film in Toronto where Ocasio deejayed complementary songs, it was understood that Maestro would follow traditional distribution for films and be expected to release in North American theaters in the spring of 2002. Ramos decided against using a traditional film distribution company in most markets because he believed that type of commercialization would ruin the message and aesthetic of the film. Instead, the film screened at various European film festivals, promoting Maestro through clubs and European dance communities.

It premiered in Spain at Barcelona City Hall on February 15, 2002, at the inaugural In-edit Festival. On July 27, 2002, Maestro screened as part of the Urban Film Project at the Baltimore Theatre Project. Its German premiere occurred at Popkomm, at the Kölner Filmhaus on August 12, 2002 before a September tour of seven other cities in Germany. In Australia, it premiered at the Astor theatre in Melbourne on December 7, 2002.

It was expected to open in UK cinemas in February 2003, but did not actually debut there until April 18, 2003, where it played at the Prince Charles Cinema.

Maestro screened at North by Northeast on June 7, 2003, and was released in New York on March 12, 2004 at the Quad Cinema, where it played until March 25, 2004. In Los Angeles, it opened on April 2, 2004, and played only at the Fairfax Cinemas on Beverly Boulevard.

It was released in Japan through Now On Media on July 31, 2004, at the Shibuya Cinema Society.

Maestro opened in South Yarra on February 25, 2005, and played through March 12, 2005, with Ramos appearing for each screening at the theater. It later screened at the Brisbane International Film Festival on July 29, 2005.

It was included as part of the Queensland Gallery of Modern Art cinema series, screening on September 7, 2016. The Criterion Collection included Maestro in the "Radical Dreams, Underground Sounds" collection presented by Dweller in 2024.

== Home media ==
Sanctuary Records released the DVD as a two-disc set on July 26, 2005, accompanied by the soundtrack CD. Disc two includes interviews with Ramos, Ron Hardy, Knuckles, and Scott, as well as 'making of' featurettes on the cinematography and the dancers. It also includes an analysis of the sound technology used in the clubs. The bonus content runs a total of two hours and twenty-six minutes. The film itself is only 77 minutes on the first disc.

DVD Talk's Randy Miller III was most impressed with the extras and audio, giving them both four out of five stars. The video component only received a 2.5 star rating, but Miller did recommend the DVD. Three audio options exist on the DVD: Dolby Stereo, Dolby 5.1, and a specialized "5.1 Househeadz Surround Remix." Miller did note that some of the featurettes on the second disc felt more like deleted scenes. He also commented that ending the series of extras with Knuckles' interview felt "poignant," with the DJ discussing his career as well as the impact of AIDS. The film itself is presented in the fullscreen 1.33:1 ratio, detracting from the visual appeal – though Miller did note he still found the film "quite watchable."

A brief review in Amoeba stated that the extras provided a "very nice and proper introduction" to the underground dance club culture of New York City. Troy Carrington of OutSmart was also impressed with the extras, and Jason Shawhan of About.com said the DVD was "exceptional," with the extras making up for the "awkwardness" of the documentary itself. Rob Thomas of The Capital Times called the DVD "sumptuous" and appreciated the information included in the bonus features. Denise Dalphond of Black Grooves said that the DVD extras made Maestro "essential" for fans and historians of dance music.

== Soundtrack ==
Maestro: Music from the Motion Picture

Soundtrack album
- Released: July 26, 2005
- Length: 78:16
- Labels: Sanctuary; Artrution
- Compiler: Kervyn Mark

The soundtrack for the film was released in the U.S. in July 2005. It was compiled and mixed by Kervyn Mark. It included monologues with some of the tracks, some of which had not been released on CD prior to the compilation. Some of the songs from the film were not included on the CD release, such as "Walking on Sunshine" and "Moody."

The theme song, "Oasis," was produced by Aaron-Carl. Rene Hewitt handled post-production, and the piece was described as fitting the "theme and feel" of Maestro with its garage house sound. The reviewer for KCBD expected the song to have three releases: the original, an instrumental, and a radio edit.

Andy Kellman of AllMusic praised the soundtrack for including songs that spanned forty years, illustrating that the dance music movement did not occur all at once. Kellman was impressed with Mark's selections, especially that the album's tracks gave a fair representation of the available music while "rarely overlapping" with other compilations and mixed albums that were its contemporaries.

US CD track listing
No.	Title	Writer(s)	Artist	Length
1.	"Burning Love Breakdown" (Prelude includes elements of "Streets" by St. Lawrence)	Peter Brown; Cory Wade	Peter Brown	5:06
2.	"Life Is Something Special"	Michael De Benedictus; Royland Fowler; Larry Levan; Bernard Philpot	NYC Peech Boys	7:42
3.	"Melting Pot"	Steve Cropper; Duck Dunn; Al Jackson Jr.; Booker T. Jones Jr.	Booker T. & the M.G.'s	7:11
4.	"Can You Feel It"	Larry Heard	Mr. Fingers	3:34
5.	"Spank" (Remix)	Ronald Smith	Jimmy "Bo" Horne	5:21
6.	"Disco Circus"	Germain Blanc; Marie G. Courtois; Alain Maurice; Evelyne Mathilde Pewzner	Martin Circus	13:52
7.	"Oasis"	Aaron-Carl	Aaron-Carl	3:19
8.	"Let Me Love You"	Guy Nado	DJ Rasoul	9:12
9.	"Way"	Jephté Guillaume; Astrid Suryanto	Jephté Guillaume; Astrid Suryanto	4:53
10.	"My Peace of Heaven"	David Morales; Alex D. Shantzis; Byron A. Stingily	Ten City	8:50
11.	"Bang Bang You're Mine"	Laurence Batchelor; Leslie Batchelor	Bang the Party	6:34
12.	"Let's Lovedance Tonight" (Edited by Jeremy Newall)	E. Matthew; G. Turnier	Gary's Gang	2:42
Total length:				78:16

The CD released with the DVD in Italy contained fourteen tracks. While the first eight titles were also included on the US edition, the track lengths differ.

Italian CD track listing
No.	Title	Writer(s)	Artist	Length
1.	"Can You Feel It" (12" Extended)	Larry Heard	Mr. Fingers	5:00
2.	"Disco Circus" (Edited by François Kevorkian)	Germain Blanc; Marie G. Courtois; Alain Maurice; Evelyne Mathilde Pewzner	Martin Circus	7:50
3.	"Melting Pot" (7" Single)	Steve Cropper; Duck Dunn; Al Jackson Jr.; Booker T. Jones Jr.	Booker T. & the M.G.'s	4:32
4.	"Life Is Something Special" (Larry Levan Remix)	Michael De Benedictus; Royland Fowler; Larry Levan; Bernard Philpot	NYC Peech Boys	6:03
5.	"Spank" (12" Mix Extended)	Ronald Smith	Jimmy "Bo" Horne	5:23
6.	"My Peace of Heaven" (David Morales Remix)	David Morales; Alex D. Shantzis; Byron A. Stingily	Ten City	5:36
7.	"Let's Lovedance Tonight" (Danny Krivit re-edit)	E. Matthew; G. Turnier	Gary's Gang	5:50
8.	"Oasis" (Kiko Navarro Remix)	Aaron-Carl	Aaron-Carl	5:14
9.	"Over and Over" (12" Mix Edited)		Sylvester	5:37
10.	"Go Bang" (François Kevorkian Remix)		Dinosaur L	6:00
11.	"Release Yourself" (12" Mix Extended)	Larry Graham	Aleems	6:12
12.	"The House Music Anthem" (12" Mix House Your Body)		Marshall Jefferson	5:24
13.	"It's That Easy Street Beat" (Danny Krivit re-edit)		Chocolette	4:40
14.	"Without You" (Danny Krivit re-edit)		Touch	6:11
Total length:				79:32

== Box office ==
When Maestro opened in New York, it grossed US$6,388 opening weekend, with only a small ad in The Village Voice. By April 19, 2004, it had not yet made US$30,000.

== Reception ==
=== Contemporary reviews ===
==== Europe ====
Hans Nieswandt of Die Tageszeitung was moved by Ramos' depiction of the tragedy of AIDS' effect on the club scene, referring to the DJs as "Icarus flying too close to the spotlight." Nieswandt expressed appreciation of how Ramos handled the topic as he focused on the development of the club culture. Nieswandt did note that the vintage footage was not of the best quality, but added that it was to be expected as professional camera crews don't find their way into the underground until the important moments have already passed.

Jamie Russell of the BBC stated that Maestro reveals little difference between the 1970s era "house music scene" and that of 2003, noting that the film does capture the "overlooked roots" of the genre. Russell also noted that the documentary suffers from trying to cover such a large span of history. Russell was unimpressed with the technical aspects of the film, calling both the cinematography and lighting "incompetent." Russell also found fault with how much camera time some individuals were given, implying some of them were inarticulate. Russell did acknowledge the film's importance to the history of dance culture, though, saying Maestro is "the cinematic equivalent of an archaeological dig" looking at a culture that challenged assumptions about race, sexuality, and gender being able to coexist. Russell rated the film three of five stars.

Stefano Sunny of Always CD praised Ramos for not using "artificial lighting, makeup, or elaborate sets" to create the look of the film. Sunny also noted how Maestro doesn't focus on the more commercialized aspects of the club scene, calling it a "social portrait."

Didier Lestrade of Têtu praised the film for covering the history of house music from a distinctly gay and Black point of view, as well as showing the impact of the Paradise Garage. Lestrade also approved of Ramos' explanation of how AIDS directly affected the club scene in New York, specifically the Garage. Lestrade even pointed out that the documentary is "a major event" because it is dedicated to depicting the Garage's influence. Still, Lestrade did state that the documentary could have included "white clubs," specifically naming those on Fire Island and the Saint, and could have included more footage of Levan.

==== Canada ====
Jason Anderson of Eye Weekly gave the film a four star rating. Anderson was impressed with the coverage of the average club patrons and how the underground dance club scene affected New York's gay culture post-Stonewall, but prior to the AIDS epidemic. When reviewing the DVD in 2005, Anderson noted that one of the strengths of Ramos' presentation of Levan's story was the focus on Levan's impact with the dancers.

Benjamin Boles of Now found the film interesting and encouraged those with a desire to learn about the origins of dance culture to see it, but acknowledged that it wouldn't be of interest to experts on the time period and didn't provide enough background for those completely unfamiliar with the subject. He did note that it contained unique footage as well as Grasso's and D'Aquisto's last interviews before their deaths.

==== United States ====
Ken Fox of TV Guide rated Maestro three out of five stars, impressed with the interviews it includes. Fox was less impressed by what he referred to as the "surprisingly stingy" soundtrack, but acknowledged that obtaining the rights to play some music pieces may have been too expensive for Ramos. Fox also noted the film's need for an "objective analysis," calling the film a "much-needed celebration" of the underground dance scene.

Michael Paoletta of Billboard said that the film "lacks direction," as well as music contemporary to the era, with the soundtrack featuring newer recordings. Paoletta did approve of the candid nature of the film, noting that it captured the "unity" in the underground dance scene of the era.

Vince Aletti of The Village Voice reviewed Maestro only briefly, saying it "would be all but unbearable" without the interviews with patrons of the underground clubs. Aletti's main complaint regarding the deejay interviews stemmed from Ramos' camerawork which he called "amateurish," noting that the archive footage of the clubs is of better quality. Logan Hill and Bilge Ebiri of New York, on the other hand, praised the film's low budget feeling as complementing the subject, as well as the choice to focus on the regular patrons rather than celebrities. Hill and Ebiri also found the soundtrack "epic."

Stephen Holden of The New York Times was unimpressed, calling it an "often inarticulate home movie" that uses a lot of jargon without explanation for those unfamiliar with the subculture depicted. Holden complained of the interviewees using "mystical hyperbole" and stated that he found watching Maestro "frustrating." He did, however, note that the film does convey the prevalence of dance in popular culture.

Ronnie Scheib of Variety commented that despite the terrible visual and audio quality of the footage from the era inside the venues featured in the film, where cameras and audio recorders were forbidden, Ramos' editing of that material with the "underlit, off-center" interviews provides an artistic quality to the history of the era. Scheib also noted that this is definitively contrasted by the montage of modern deejays that ends the film.

Kevin Thomas of the Los Angeles Times was thoroughly impressed with the film, calling it a "revelation" for those unfamiliar with the subject. Thomas noted that the main foci of the film are Levan and Mancuso. He specifically noted the patrons and deejays interviewed about Paradise Garage mentioning the Stonewall riots and the repercussions of dancing with someone of the same sex, as well as interviewees recalling how some club owners tried to warn their clientele regarding drugs and unprotected sex when praising Ramos for including the negative aspects of the underground clubs.

Jan Fuscoe of Time Out called it "an attempt at a linear history," but then stated that Maestro is really just Levan's history with a lot of commentary that tells viewers "you had to be there." Fuscoe stated that the film doesn't cause excitement in the viewer and blamed the "sometimes obvious editing" where footage of dancers is lined up with interviewees speaking rather than a soundtrack.

Regarding the film content, Randy Miller, III of DVD Talk thought the presentation itself could have been better, especially the lack of a narrator to transition between segments. While there is text that appears on screen to serve this purpose, Miller felt it wasn't always appropriately worded, and that the documentary "loses its footing" when the text appears. He also noted that the pacing felt rushed, but noted that the information is well organized despite the subjective presentation.

Ron Bain of La Voz Nueva called the film a "loving, intimate look" at the history of the New York underground clubs. Bain noted Maestro's coverage of the culture among the patrons of the clubs and how they provided refuge from sexual and cultural repression, and recommended the film to anyone interested in the origins of "dance music, disco, or the modern DJ scene."

Alex Posell of XLR8R was disappointed that Ramos focused on The Loft and Paradise Garage to the near exclusion of other venues. Posell did enjoy the interviews with the club patrons as well as the soundtrack. Posell called the editing "sloppy" and the sound "imperfect," yet noted that Maestro engenders a sense of wonder in the viewer.

With respect to the documentary itself, Rob Thomas of The Capital Times said that Maestro lacked organization, but successfully conveyed "the spirit and flavor" of the era. Thomas was impressed with Ramos' decision to conduct interviews in the street at night, congruent with the film's subject matter.

=== Retrospective reviews ===
Niall O'Conghaile of DangerousMinds.net noted that Maestro is "careful to explain" the beginnings of the dance culture it depicts as being the underground New York City clubs of the late 1960s and the early 1970s. O'Conghaile enjoyed the footage from inside the venues as well as the discussions with the deejays, being particularly moved by François K's recollections of AIDS' devastation on the "party scene." O'Conghaile was also impressed with the music in the film.

Milan van Ooijen of Deep House Amsterdam stated Maestro provided insight into the origins of the culture surrounding dance music, noting the personal aspect to the documentary and its focus on the lifestyle.

== See also ==
- 2002 in film
- 2003 in film
- 2004 in film

== Sources ==
- "Full House: Cool new NYC house documentary, hitting cinemas next month". Muzik Magazine. February 2003. p. 30. ISSN 1358-541X – via Internet Archive.
- "Get What You Want: Music Cinema – Maestro 2003 M". Queensland Gallery of Modern Art. September 7, 2016. Archived from the original on June 25, 2025 – via Trove.
- "Josell Ramos: Writer/Producer/Director of Maestro". KCBD. December 12, 2014 [June 10, 2002].
- "Knuckles" (PDF). Melbourne Star. February 17, 2005. Archived from the original (PDF) on February 19, 2005.
- 『マエストロ』公開劇場一覧 [List of Theaters Screening "Maestro"]. Movienet.co.jp (in Japanese). 2004. Archived from the original on July 18, 2004.
- "Maestro". Brisbane International Film Festival. July 27, 2005. Archived from the original on July 21, 2005 – via Trove.
- マエストロ [Maestro]. Eiga.com (in Japanese). 2004.
- "Maestro: A Must See Documentary". KCBD. December 12, 2014 [May 1, 2002].
- "Maestro - The story of underground dance". Inthemix.com.au. December 3, 2002. Archived from the original on August 18, 2003 – via Trove.
- マエストロ〈2003年〉 [Maestro (2003)]. PIA (in Japanese). 2004.
- Ramos, Josell (February 24, 2005). "Maestro's dance culture" (PDF). B.News Publishing (Interview). Archived from the original (PDF) on June 23, 2005.
- "Rant! ...The BADDEST mofo low-down 'round town!". Amoeba. Fall 2008. p. 29 – via Internet Archive.
- "Schedule". koelngig.de (in German). 2002. Archived from the original on August 23, 2002.
- "A Time to Listen". New York City AIDS Memorial. Archived from the original on January 27, 2022.
- Aletti, Vince (March 10, 2004). "Tracking Shots". The Village Voice. Archived from the original on March 10, 2004.
- Altell, Oriol (October 27, 2022). ""La gent no ve a l'In-Edit a veure el Bowie, ve a descobrir històries"" ["People don't come to In-Edit to see Bowie, they come to discover stories"]. El Nacional (Interview) (in Catalan). Interviewed by Oriol Rodriguez. Photographer: Carlos Baglietto. Archived from the original on October 28, 2022.
- Anderson, Jason (June 5, 2003). "Music and movement". Eye Weekly. Archived from the original on June 20, 2003.
- Anderson, Jason (July 7, 2005). "George Kuchar and Robert Kennedy". Eye Weekly. Archived from the original on June 26, 2006.
- Bain, Don (August 3, 2005). "An inside look at the movement that changed the world of music". La Voz Nueva. Vol. 31, no. 31. p. 18. JSTOR community.28046460.
- Barnaby (October 9, 2024). "5 Definitive House Music Documentaries". Nexus Radio.
- Boles, Benjamin (September 6, 2001). "New Film Uncovers Secret Club History". Now Toronto. Vol. 21, no. 1. Archived from the original on November 18, 2002.
- Boles, Benjamin (June 12, 2003). "Pulse". Now Toronto.
- Calleja, Pedro (February 8, 2002). "Lecciones de house" [Lessons in House Music]. La Luna. El Mundo (in Spanish). No. 161. Archived from the original on October 24, 2002.
- Carrington, Troy (August 2005). "DVD/VHS Previews". OutSmart. Vol. 12, no. 7. p. 60 – via Internet Archive.
- Dalphond, Denise (July 7, 2006). "Maestro". Black Grooves. Archived from the original on September 11, 2012.
- Fox, Ken (2004). "Last night a DJ saved my life". Cinebooks Database. TV Guide. Archived from the original on April 27, 2004.
- Fuscoe, Jan (2005). Pym, John (ed.). Time Out Film Guide (14th ed.). London: Universal House. p. 814. ISBN 1-904978-878 – via Internet Archive.
- González, Manu (2016). Dance: Electronic Music (in Spanish). Barcelona: Redbook Ediciones. ISBN 978-84-15256-89-2.
- Hardy, Ernest (August 23, 2016). "Art Doc of the Week | What is the Paradise Garage?". Mandatory. Archived from the original on September 23, 2020.
- Hill, Logan; Ebiri, Bilge (March 2004). "Movies: Maestro". New York.
- Holden, Stephen (March 12, 2004). "Film in Review; 'Maestro'". The New York Times. Archived from the original on May 28, 2015.
- Kellman, Andy (n.d.). "Maestro Review". AllMusic.
- Kirn, Peter (January 15, 2024). "Celebrate Black club music with 130 tracks and 13 films". Create Digital Music. Archived from the original on January 16, 2024.
- Lestrade, Didier (November 2006). "«Maestro», Histoire d'un Mythe" ["Maestro", History of a Myth] (PDF). Têtu (in French). Archived (PDF) from the original on September 15, 2025.
- Lopez Cassell, Dessane (March 20, 2024). "How Dweller Charts a Path Through Black Queer Spaces". The Criterion Collection.
- Mark, Kervyn, ed. (2005). Maestro: Music from the Motion Picture (PDF) (Liner notes). Sanctuary Records – via Internet Archive.
- McCabe, Bret (July 24, 2002). "Hotter Than July: Artscape's Musical Lineup Burns Brighter Than Usual". Baltimore City Paper.
- Miller, III, Randy (July 25, 2005). "Maestro - A History of Dance Music Culture". DVD Talk.
- O'Conghaile, Niall (June 25, 2011). "'Maestro' – a film about the Paradise Garage and the birth of Disco culture". DangerousMinds.net. Far Out Magazine.
- Nieswandt, Hans (July 31, 2002). "Die Doku "Maestro" huldigt den ersten DJs" ["Maestro" Documentary pays tribute to first DJs]. Die Tageszeitung (in German). No. 6814. p. 16. Archived from the original on December 25, 2002.
- Paoletta, Michael (February 28, 2004). "Prommer/Caroline deal offers new distrib option". Billboard. Vol. 116, no. 9. p. 43. Gale A113758508.
- Posell, Alex (August 2005). "House of Wax: Is Maestro just voguing to its own groove?". XLR8R. No. 89. p. 32. ISSN 1526-4246 – via Internet Archive.
- Ramos, Josell (March 18, 2004). "An Interview with "MAESTRO" Filmmaker Josell Ramos". Film Festivals.com (Interview). Interviewed by Maria Esteves.
- Richardson, Rania (April 19, 2004). "Tales of Self-Distribution: "Robot Stories," "Maestro," "The Gatekeeper," and "Superstar in a Housedress"". IndieWire.
- Roberts, Randall (February 15, 2023). "Watch the revelatory 2004 documentary 'Maestro: Larry Levan and the Paradise Garage'". In Sheep's Clothing HiFi.
- Romero, Dennis (July 21, 2005). "Bravo, 'MAESTRO' – New documentary captures the rebellious beginnings of NYC dance culture". LA CityBeat. Archived from the original on December 22, 2005.
- Russell, Jamie (April 15, 2003). "Maestro (2003)". BBC.
- Scheck, Frank (March 19, 2004). "Maestro". The Hollywood Reporter. Archived from the original on April 14, 2004.
- Scheib, Ronnie (March 15, 2004). "Maestro (docu)". Variety – via TheFreeLibrary.
- Shawhan, Jason (2005). "Maestro". About.com. Archived from the original on September 18, 2005.
- Sommer, Sally R. (2009). "C'mon to My House" / Underground House Dancing". In Malnig, Julie (ed.). Ballroom, Boogie, Shimmy Sham, Shake: a Social and Popular Dance Reader. Urbana: University of Illinois Press. ISBN 978-0-252-07565-0. LCCN 2008009043 – via Internet Archive.
- Sturridge, Tom (May 22, 2026). "Tom Sturridge on Ira Sachs' 'The Man I Love,' Finding the 'Physical Language' of His On-Screen Relationship With Rami Malek and Joining Mia Hansen-Løve's Next Film". Variety (Interview). Interviewed by Alex Ritman. Archived from the original on May 24, 2026.
- Sunny, Stefano (2006). "Maestro". AlwaysCD.com (in Italian). Archived from the original on April 17, 2024.
- Thomas, Kevin (April 2, 2004). "They were in it for love of music and good times". Los Angeles Times.
- Thomas, Rob (August 31, 2005). "DVD Does Justice to Innovator Moog". The Capital Times. p. 4B. Gale A135710210.
- van Ooijen, Milan (May 28, 2014) [February 22, 2014]. "Documentary: 'Maestro' – the Birth of Dance Music Culture". Deep House Amsterdam.
- Walker, Alexander (April 17, 2003). "film openings this week". London Evening Standard. Gale A100194214.
- Weinstein, Steve (March 12, 2004). "Last night a DJ saved my life". The New York Blade. Archived from the original on March 25, 2004.
