= Bass (sound) =

Tone of low frequency or range

Bass voice range.

Bass (/beɪs/ BAYSS) (also called bottom end) describes tones of low (also called "deep") frequency, pitch and range from 16 to 250 Hz (C_{0} to middle C_{4}) and bass instruments that produce tones in the low-pitched range C_{2}-C_{4}. They belong to different families of instruments and can cover a wide range of musical roles. Since producing low pitches usually requires a long air column or string, and for stringed instruments, a large hollow body, the string and wind bass instruments are usually the largest instruments in their families or instrument classes.

== Musical role ==
Alberti bass in Mozart's Piano Sonata, K 545 opening.

When bass notes are played in a musical ensemble such as an orchestra, they are frequently used to provide a counterpoint or counter-melody, in a harmonic context either to outline or juxtapose the progression of the chords, or with percussion to underline the rhythm.

=== Rhythm section ===
In popular music, the bass part, which is called the "bassline", typically provides harmonic and rhythmic support to the band. The bass player is a member of the rhythm section in a band, along with the drummer, rhythm guitarist, and, in some cases, a keyboard instrument player (e.g., piano or Hammond organ). The bass player emphasizes the root or fifth of the chord in their basslines (and to a lesser degree, the third of the chord) and accents the strong beats.

== Kinds of bass harmony ==
In classical music, different forms of bass are: basso concertante, or basso recitante; the bass voice of the chorus; the bass which accompanies the softer passages of a composition, as well as those passages which employ the whole power of the ensemble, generally played by the violoncellos in orchestral music; contrabass (“under bass”), is described as that part which is performed by the double basses; violoncellos often play the same line an octave higher, or a different melodic or rhythmic part which is not a bassline when double basses are used; basso ripieno; that bass which joins in the full passages of a composition, and, by its depth of tone and energy of stroke, affords a powerful contrast to the lighter and softer passages or movements.

Basso continuo was an approach to writing music during the Baroque music era (1600–1750). With basso continuo, a written-out bassline served to set out the chord progression for an entire piece (symphony, concerto, Mass, or other work), with the bassline being played by pipe organ or harpsichord and the chords being improvised by players of chordal instruments (theorbo, lute, harpsichord, etc.).

"The bass differs from other voices because of the particular role it plays in supporting and defining harmonic motion. It does so at levels ranging from immediate, chord-by-chord events to the larger harmonic organization of an entire work."

== Instruments ==
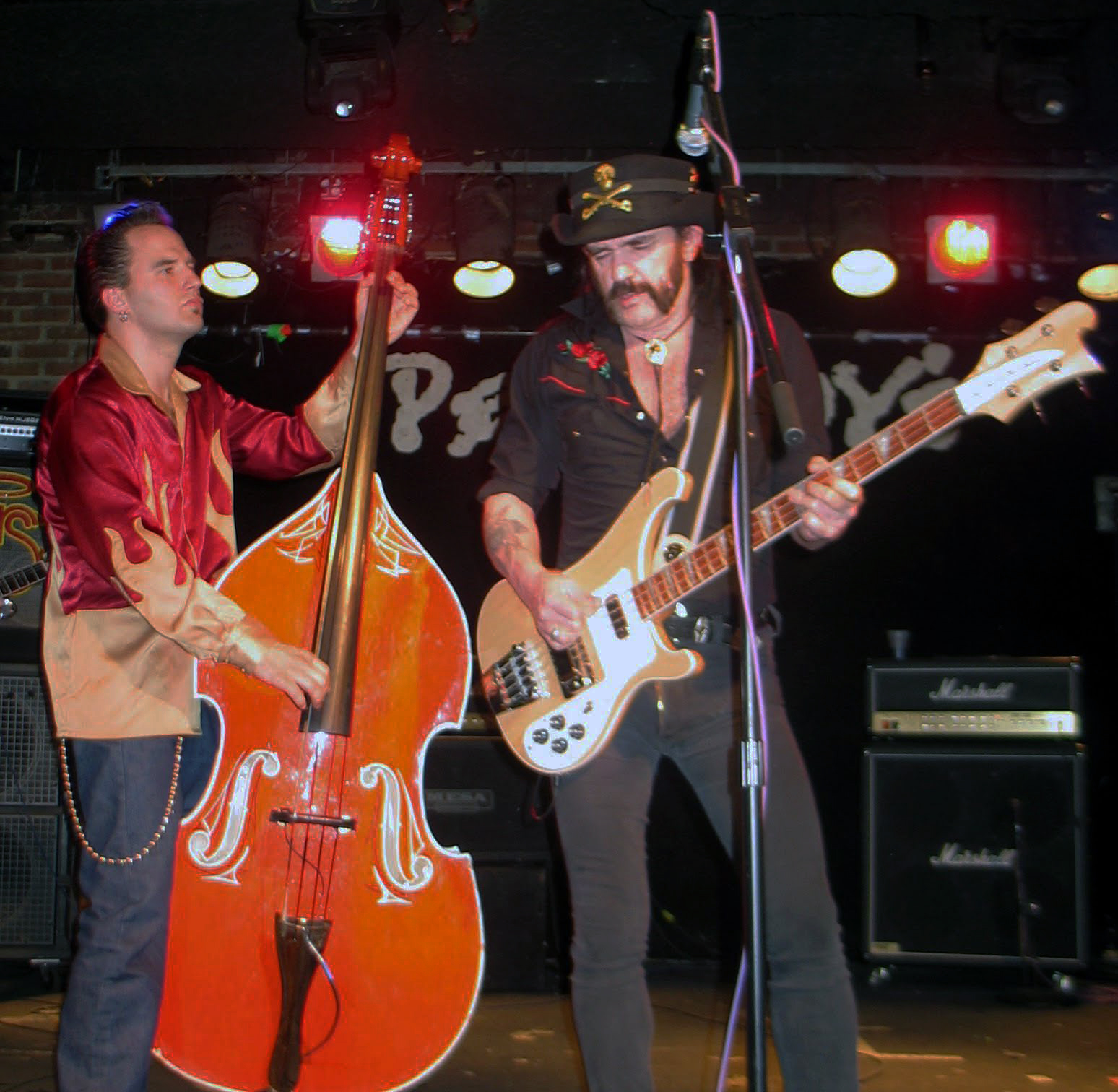
Djordje Stijepovic and Lemmy Kilmister playing a double bass and a bass guitar

A bass instrument is a musical instrument that produces tones in the low-pitched range C_{2}–C_{4}. Basses belong to different families of instruments and can cover a wide range of musical roles. Since producing low pitches usually requires a long air column or string, the string and wind bass instruments are usually the largest instruments in their families or instrument classes. A musician playing one of these instruments is often known as a bassist.

The electric bass guitar is usually the instrument referred to as a "bass" in pop and rock music. Invented in the 1930s by Paul Tutmarc, it was first mass-produced by Leo Fender in 1951 and quickly replaced the more unwieldy double bass among non-classical musicians. The double bass is usually the instrument referred to as a "bass" in European classical music and jazz. Mozart called the cello the most common bass instrument in his time. A bass singer has the lowest vocal range of all voice types, typically a range extending from around the second E below middle C to the E above middle C (i.e., E_{2}–E_{4}). Wind family basses include the bass horn, such as a tuba, serpent, and sousaphone, as well as low-tuned versions such as bassoon, bass clarinet, bass trombone, and bass saxophone.

== Music shows and dances ==
With recorded music playback, for owners of 33 rpm LPs and 45 singles, the availability of loud and deep bass was limited by the ability of the phonograph record stylus to track the groove. While some hi-fi aficionados had solved the problem by using other playback sources, such as reel-to-reel tape players which were capable of delivering accurate, naturally deep bass from acoustic sources, or synthetic bass not found in nature, with the popular introduction of the compact cassette in the late 1960s it became possible to add more low-frequency content to recordings. By the mid-1970s, 12" vinyl singles, which allowed for "more bass volume", were used to record disco, reggae, dub and hip-hop tracks; dance club DJs played these records in clubs with subwoofers to achieve "physical and emotional" reactions from dancers.

In the early 1970s, early disco DJs sought out deeper bass sounds for their dance events. David Mancuso hired sound engineer Alex Rosner to design additional subwoofers for his disco dance events, along with "tweeter arrays" to "boost the treble and bass at opportune moments" at his private, underground parties at The Loft. The demand for sub-bass sound reinforcement in the 1970s was driven by the important role of "powerful bass drum" in disco, as compared with rock and pop; to provide this deeper range, a third crossover point from 40 Hz to 120 Hz (centering on 80 Hz) was added. The Paradise Garage discotheque in New York City, which operated from 1977 to 1987, had "custom designed 'sub-bass' speakers" developed by Alex Rosner's disciple, sound engineer Richard ("Dick") Long that were called "Levan Horns" (in honor of resident DJ Larry Levan).

By the end of the 1970s, subwoofers were used in dance venue sound systems to enable the playing of "[b]ass-heavy dance music" that we "do not 'hear' with our ears but with our entire body". At the club, Long used four Levan bass horns, one in each corner of the dancefloor, to create a "haptic and tactile quality" in the sub-bass that you could feel in your body. To overcome the lack of sub-bass frequencies on 1970s disco records (sub-bass frequencies below 60 Hz were removed during mastering), Long added a DBX 100 "Boom Box" subharmonic pitch generator into his system to synthesize 25 Hz to 50 Hz sub-bass from the 50 to 100 Hz bass on the records. In the early 1980s, Long designed a sound system for the Warehouse dance club, with "huge stacks of subwoofers" which created "deep and intense" bass frequencies that "pound[ed] through your system" and "entire body", enabling clubgoers to "viscerally experience" the DJs' house music mixes.

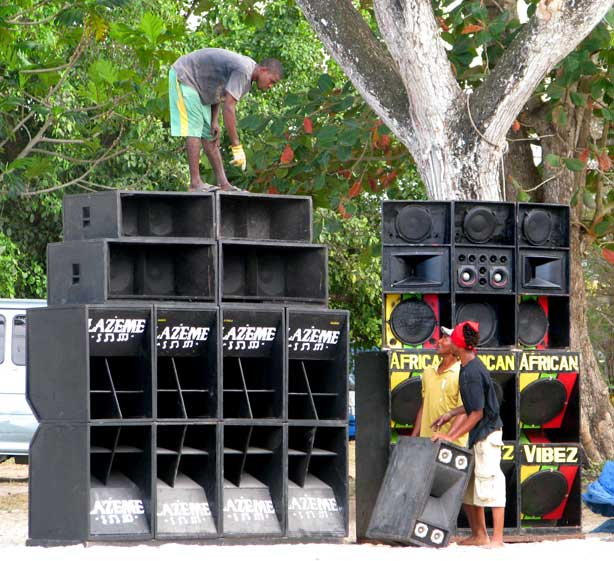
A crew sets up a sound system, including large bass bins, in Jamaica in 2009.

Deep, heavy bass is central to Jamaican musical styles such as dub and reggae. In Jamaica in the 1970s and 1980s, sound engineers for reggae sound systems began creating "heavily customized" subwoofer enclosures by adding foam and tuning the cabinets to achieve "rich and articulate speaker output below 100 Hz". The sound engineers who developed the "bass-heavy signature sound" of sound reinforcement systems have been called "deserving as much credit for the sound of Jamaican music as their better-known music producer cousins". The sound engineers for Stone Love Movement (a sound system crew), for example, modified folded horn subwoofers they imported from the US to get more of a bass reflex sound that suited local tone preferences for dancehall audiences, as the unmodified folded horn was found to be "too aggressive" sounding and "not deep enough for Jamaican listeners".

In Jamaican sound system culture, there are both "low and high bass bins" in "towering piles" that are "delivered in large trucks" and set up by a crew of "box boys", and then positioned and adjusted by the sound engineer in a process known as "stringing up", all to create the "sound of reggae music you can literally feel as it comes off these big speakers". Sound system crews hold 'sound clash' competitions, where each sound system is set up and then the two crews try to outdo each other.

== Movies ==
The use of subwoofers to provide deep bass in film presentations received a great deal of publicity in 1974 with the movie Earthquake which was released in Sensurround. Initially installed in 17 U.S. theaters, the Cerwin Vega "Sensurround" system used large subwoofers which were driven by racks of 500 watt amplifiers which were triggered by control tones printed on one of the audio tracks on the film. Four of the subwoofers were positioned in front of the audience under (or behind) the film screen and two more were placed together at the rear of the audience on a platform. Powerful noise energy and loud rumbling in the range of 17 Hz to 120 Hz was generated at the level of 110–120 decibels of sound pressure level, abbreviated dB(SPL). The new low frequency entertainment method helped the film become a box office success. More Sensurround systems were assembled and installed. By 1976 there were almost 300 Sensurround systems in theaters. Other films to use the effect include Midway in 1976 and Rollercoaster in 1977.

== See also ==
- Sub bass
- Treble (sound)
- Bass clef
- Figured bass
