= Judy Weinstein =

Judy Weinstein is a businesswoman who has been active in dance music since the 1970s. From 1971 onwards, she attended David Mancuso's parties at The Loft in New York City, and assisted Mancuso with the running of his record pool. In January 1978 David closed the record pool for several weeks without notice or explanation, apparently suffering from stress. On February 1, 1978, she started a new record pool, For the Record, with Mark Riley and Hank Williams, and recruited a large number of New York's top DJs.

Weinstein also co-founded the Def Mix production company in 1987, which became the home for DJs including Frankie Knuckles, David Morales and Satoshi Tomiie. Weinstein brought Def Mix to Ibiza with a long-standing residency at Pacha.

Weinstein also served as a bridge between traditional record companies and the dance music scene by working as a consultant on remixing for PolyGram Records, A&M Records and MCA Records. She also produced a remix of her own, of "Borderlines" by Jeffrey Osborne.
