= Don't Make Me Wait (Peech Boys song) =

Single by Peech Boys
- Released: 1982
- Recorded: Acoustilog, New York City, New York, U.S.
- Genre: Post-disco
- Length: 7:43 (Extended Version)
- Label: West End (US WES-22140)
- Songwriter(s): R. Bernard Fowler, Peech Boys
- Producer(s): Larry Levan, Michael de Benedictus

Peech Boys singles chronology
| "Life Is Something Special" (1982) | "Don't Make Me Wait" (1982) | "On a Journey" (1983) |

"Don't Make Me Wait" is a song recorded by the Peech Boys in 1982. It was written by the band and produced by Paradise garage DJ Larry Levan. It was released by West End Records and peaked at No. 89 on the Billboard R&B singles chart and No. 49 on the UK Singles Chart.

"Don't Make Me Wait" received a respectable play at Paradise Garage. The song is characterized by overdubbed bass, soulful vocals, and gospel-like piano lines reminiscent of those in house music.

== Track listing ==
12" vinyl

- US: West End / WES-22140

Side one
| No. | Title | Length |
|---|---|---|
| 1. | "Don't Make Me Wait" (Extended Version) | 7:14 |

Side two
| No. | Title | Length |
|---|---|---|
| 1. | "Don't Make Me Wait" (Dub Mix) | 5:52 |

== Personnel ==
- Charles Walden – engineer
- Larry Levan, Michael de Benedictus - producers
- Howie Weinberg at Masterdisk, New York – mastering
- "Special thanks to: Robert P. Kasper"

== Chart positions ==
| Chart (1982) | Peak position |
|---|---|
| UK Singles Chart | 49 |
| US Billboard Hot Dance Club Play | 6 |
| US Billboard Hot Black Singles | 89 |
