= Dance Music Hall of Fame =

Award

The Dance Music Hall of Fame was an organization established in 2003 to honor and remember significant contributors to the genre of dance music. It had its first inductions in 2004, but went inactive after the 2005 induction ceremony.

== History ==
The Dance Music Hall of Fame was created in 2003 when music industry veteran John Parker (Robbins Entertainment) thought that something needed to be done to honor the creators and innovators of dance music. He enlisted the help of Eddie O'Loughlin (Next Plateau Records) initially and then they brought Daniel Glass (Glassworks), Tom Silverman (Tommy Boy Records) & Brian Chin (noted dance music writer/historian) in to form the organization. The Dance Music Hall of Fame recognizes the contributions of those who have had a significant impact on the evolution and development of dance music and celebrates the history and significance of the genre.

Artists, Producers, Record, Remixer and DJs that helped to shape the dance music industry become eligible for induction 25 years after their first contribution or record release. Criteria include the influence and significance of the nominee's contributions to dance music. The Dance Music Hall Of Fame Board of Advisers was composed of dance music professionals, historians and journalists. When the nominees were selected the ballots were sent to an international voting committee of over 1,000 dance music experts. An awards ceremony announcing the inductees in the Dance Music Hall Of Fame would take place annually at a formal dinner event in New York. The 2005 ceremony was part of Billboard's annual Dance Music Summit, and took place at the Manhattan Center.

Dancers - Luis & Mary Ann Rosa, Chris Bates & Trish Caballera, Ron Bess & JoAnne Piazza, Walter Levy & Raluca Sheilds, Susan Fritz & Yvette Rivera & Keith Harrison.

Due to financial differences among the board members, The Dance Music Hall of Fame ceased operations after its second ceremony in 2005.

=== First board ===
2004 - Dance Music Hall of Fame (DMHoF) Board of Directors: Daniel Glass, Eddie O'Loughlin, John Parker, Tom Silverman.

2004 - Board of Advisers: Marty Angelo, John "Jellybean" Benitez, Joey Carvello, Mel Cheren, Michael Ellis, Dimitri from Paris, Tony Humphries, Frankie Knuckles, Jurgen Korduletsch, Brad LeBeau, John Luongo, Guy Moot, Michael Paoletta, Vince Pellegrino, Cory Robbins, Pete Tong, Cary Vance, Louie Vega, Pete Waterman, Judy Weinstein, Brian Chin.

== Inductees ==
=== Artists ===
- Chic (2005)
- Sylvester (2005)
- Gloria Gaynor (2005)
- Bee Gees (2004)
- Donna Summer (2004)
- Barry White (2004)

=== Records ===
- "Disco Inferno" - The Trammps (2005)
- "Good Times" - Chic (2005)
- "Got to Be Real" - Cheryl Lynn (2005)
- "Stayin' Alive" - Bee Gees (2005)
- "I Will Survive" - Gloria Gaynor (2005)
- "I Feel Love" - Donna Summer (2004)
- "Don't Leave Me This Way" - Thelma Houston (2004)
- "Love Is the Message" - MFSB (2004)
- "You Make Me Feel (Mighty Real)" - Sylvester (2004)
- "Shame" - Evelyn "Champagne" King (2004)

=== Producers ===
- Bernard Edwards (2005)
- Kenny Gamble (2005)
- Nile Rodgers (2005)
- Leon Huff (2005)
- Quincy Jones (2005)
- Pete Bellotte (2004)
- Giorgio Moroder (2004)

=== DJs ===
- John "Jellybean" Benitez (2005)
- Francois Kevorkian (2005)
- Frankie Knuckles (2005)
- Larry Levan (2004)
- David Mancuso (2004)
- Tee Scott (2004)

=== Remixers ===
- Francois Kevorkian (2005)
- Tom Moulton (2004)

=== The Board of Directors Award for Lifetime Achievement (Non-Performer) ===
- Mel Cheren (2005)
- Henry Stone (2004)

== See also ==
- National Museum of Dance and Hall of Fame
