= Kelli Hand =

American DJ (1964–2021)

Kelley Hand
- Born: September 15, 1964; Detroit, Michigan, U.S.
- Died: August 3, 2021 (aged 56) Detroit, Michigan, U.S.
- Genres: Techno, electronic music
- Occupation: Musician
- Years active: 1980-2000

Kelley Hand (September 15, 1964 – August 3, 2021), known professionally as Kelli Hand and K-HAND, was a musician and DJ from Detroit, Michigan, United States. Hand was widely credited with opening the door for Black women's participation in the previously male-dominated techno and electronic music communities during the 1990s and was known as the "First Lady of Detroit techno". A prolific DJ with an "impossibly deep catalogue", Hand continued to produce and perform music up until her death in 2021.

== Life and career ==
Born on September 15, 1964, and raised in Detroit, Hand immersed herself in New York's club scene during her youth in the 1980s, especially frequenting the legendary Paradise Garage when Larry Levan was playing as well as Club Area. She purchased her own equipment and began teaching herself to produce and DJ in her bedroom, before eventually beginning to play clubs and landing a residency at Detroit's Zipper's Nightclub.

In 1990, Hand founded her own label, initially named UK House Records, but quickly renamed to Acacia Records after a Detroit street she had previously lived on. Her debut release was an EP, Think About It.

In 1994, her single, Global Warning, was released on the British label Warp Records. In 1995, her debut studio album, On A Journey, was released on Studio !K7. By the year 2000, seven further albums were released on the labels, !K7 Records, Distance, Tresor, and Ausfahrt.

Hand's imprint Acacia Label continues to release new vinyl records as well as re-releases of Hand's back catalogue.

== Musical style ==
Despite her Detroit background, Hand identified her musical influences as being from mostly Chicago and New York electronic music scenes, including Larry Levan, Marshall Jefferson, and Larry Heard. Her main Detroit influences included Jeff Mills and the Underground Resistance as well as Ken Collier. Hand frequently incorporated the particular "jack" and "swing" sounds distinctive to Chicago house in her music.

As described by Matt Unicomb in 2016,

The K-HAND sound is based on smart sampling and even smarter drums. Taking cues from the percussive Chicago aesthetic sculpted by Paul Johnson, Cajmere and others, her tracks are stripped-down and full of personality, built on swinging beats and catchy basslines. The many gems in her catalogue—"Love Games," "Candle Lights," "Project 5 (Untitled B1)" among them—ooze character. It's the sound of a lost era, built with the qualities that so many people love in this type of US dance music—funk, rawness, emotion.

Hand was deeply influenced by her years spent listening and dancing to the music of Larry Levan before his death in 1992:

The upbeat records played by Paradise Garage's resident DJs, headed up by Larry Levan, would inform Hand's style for years to come. Like Levan behind the decks, Hand would get strange, unexpected results from disparate samples and sounds, generating new meaning by chopping simple phrases and pairing them with fat, swinging MPC beats.

Hand was also a vinyl enthusiast, stating that "if it's not on vinyl, it's not final" because she valued its "warm" and "analogue" sound. Many of Hand's tracks feature a "very specific and strong sense of emotion" and Hand herself remarked that "a lot of my songs are lovey-dovey".

== Awards and accolades ==
Hand was presented with a Spirit of Detroit Award in 2016 along with several other electronic musicians including Jeff Mills, Juan Atkins, Derrick May, and Kevin Saunderson. In July 2017, Hand was named a First Lady of Detroit and honored by the city with a Testimonial Resolution certificate acknowledging her substantial contributions to techno and dance music.

== Death ==
Hand died at her home in Detroit on August 3, 2021, from arteriosclerotic cardiovascular disease at the age of 56.

== Discography ==
Hand released most of her music under the moniker K-HAND, but also released music under the names Etat Solide, Rhythm Formation (with Claude Young), Queen Mecca, Kelli Hand, and Kerohand.

Studio albums

- On A Journey (1995) (Studio !K7)
- The Art Of Music (1997) (Studio !K7)
- Ready For The Darkness (1997) (Substance/Distance)
- Soul (1997) (Ausfahrt)
- Fantasy (1998) (Ausfahrt)
- Salsafied (2000) (Ausfahrt)
- Detroit History Part 1 (2001) (Tresor)

Extended plays

- K-HAND/Etat Solide – Think About It (1990) (UK House Records/Acacia Records)
- K-HAND/Etat Solide feat. Zoey – No Heartbreaks (1992) (Acacia Records)
- Ba Da Bing (1993) (Acacia Records)
- K-HAND featuring Rhythm Formation – Rhythm Is Back (1993) (Acacia Records)
- K-HAND / Claude Young – Everybody / You Give Me (1993) (Acacia Records)
- Not Giving Up (1993) (Acacia Records)
- From The "I Fucked All Week" Guy (1993) (Acacia Records)
- Rodeo / The Tunnel (1993) (Global Cuts)
- K-HAND feat. Zoey – I Do (1993) (Acacia Records)
- The Saints Go Marching On (1994) (Global Cuts)
- Global Warning (1994) (Warp Records)
- Everybody (1994) (EC Records)
- K-HAND/Etat Solide – Living For Another (1995) (UK House Records)
- Project #1 (1995) (Acacia Records)
- Project #2 (1995) (Acacia Records)
- Project #3 (1995) (Acacia Records)
- Project #4 (1995) (Acacia Records)
- Acid Nation (1995) (Loriz Sounds)
- Groove E.P. (1995) (Radikal Fear)
- On A Mission (1996) (Studio !K7)
- The Project EP (1996) (D:Tour)
- The Next Project EP (1996) (D:Tour)
- Unreleased Project (1996) (Acacia Records)
- K-HAND/KMH – Right Now EP (1997) (M.C. Projects)
- Mayday EP (1997) (Acacia Records)
- K-HAND / Graffiti – Roots / Graffiti's Theme (1997) (Sublime Records)
- Project 5 EP Untitled (1997) (Acacia Records)
- Horizon (1997) (Substance)
- All Over The World (1997) (Acacia Records)
- Spice EP (1997) (Acacia Records)
- Flashback EP (1997) (Acacia Records)
- Sounds (1997) (Hyperspace)
- Project 69 EP (1997) (Acacia Records)
- Sweet Love (1998) (Fourone1 Records)
- K-HAND/By Kely – The Bomb (1998) (Re-load Records)
- Do It (1999) (Distance)
- Pimps & Freaks (1999) (Remote Recordings)
- Good Love (1999) (Maffia Music)
- Baby All I Want (1999) (School Records)
- Supernatural (1999) (Pandamonium)
- K-HAND/Kely – Active X EP (2000) (Future Frontier)
- Traxx For Daze Vol.1 (2000) (Push & Pull)
- Clap Yo Hands (2000) (Loveslap! Recordings)
- Better Believe (2000) (Maffia Music)
- Sex On The Dancefloor EP (2001) (Loveslap! Recordings)
- Tools Vol.1 (2002) (Acacia Records)
- K-HAND/Kelli Hand – Afterhour (2003) (Sino)
- Get Down (2003) (Loveslap! Recordings)
- K-HAND/Kelli Hand – Moody Life EP (2004) (Third Ear Recordings)
- Messenger aka K-HAND – Wanderer (2007) (Underground Liberation)
- These Sounds Lead The Way EP (2008) (Gorsch)
- Feel (2008) (Acacia Records)
- K-HAND & Kero – Dat Roit EP (2009) (Kerohand)
- Red Dog EP (2009) (Gorsch)
- K-HAND/Kelli Hand – Silent Answer EP (2009) (Acacia Records)
- K-HAND & Kero – Content EP (2010) (Kerohand)
- Funky Tonight (2013) (Third Ear Recordings)
- Do it Again (2015) (DocKside Records)
- Intuition EP (2015) (Acacia Records)
- Project 6 EP (2017) (Acacia Records)

Compilations

- 1996: Various - "Detroit: Beyond the Third Wave" - Come On Now Baby (Astralwerks Records)
- 2012: fabric 66 – Starz (Fabric Records)
- 2013: fabric 67 – Project 5 Untitled B1 (Fabric Records)
- 2015: Various - "Ivan, Come On! Unlock The Box!" – The Box трип (Trip Records)
- 2016: Various - "I Have A Question" – Sound 6 трип (Trip Records)
- 2017: Special Edition - 07 трип (Trip Records)
- 2020: Hot Steel - Aquatics (Trip Records)

== See also ==
- Detroit techno
- Music of Detroit, Michigan
