= Aaron-Carl Ragland =

American electronic dance musician

Aaron-Carl Ragland (August 19, 1973 – September 30, 2010), better known simply as Aaron-Carl, was an American electronic dance musician. He was a Detroit singer, songwriter, producer, DJ, and record label owner. He switched between different flows of music like lush-house, brute-force, techno, and bumping electro-funk. His versatile touch of music also included sexual lyrics. From the beginning of his career, he released music under Detroit labels like soul city, metroplex, short-lived moods and grooves sub-label afrosyntrix and then soon launched his own label "Wallshaker Records" where most of his music started to come out under his own label. He was also respected as a DJ.

In 1999, he was the founder of the Detroit-based Wallshaker Records, an independent record label and music production company specializing in soulful house music, and of Cherry Juice Recordings, its European, Amsterdam-based, more Pop, record label. He was founder and CEO of W.A.R.M.T.H. International Inc. In addition to his own label, he also released materials on such respected labels as Ovum and the Underground Resistance sub-label Soul City as well as Rebirth, Metroplex, Subject Detroit and Universal France. Ragland's demo caught the attention of Mike Banks which was the owner and lead the Underground Resistance and he was signed to "UR's sub label Soul City. This led to his first two records "Wash it (featuring "Down") and "Crucified" which helped him gain international and local following.

He remixed many Detroit techno artists, like Underground Resistance, Scan 7, DJ Bone, Aux 88 & Kelli Hand. In addition, he has remixed various house, R&B and other mainstream artists, including Dajae, GusGus, Manu Dibango, N'Dambi (with Keite Young) and Kindred the Family Soul, CeCe Peniston ("Above Horizons") and Michelle Weeks. Under the label he was signed to he released "four 12 singles" that went well. A DJ named Gary Chandler that was known for his R&B and hiphop played a few of his songs, "Wash it", "Make Me Happy" to name a few on local radios and at his personal parties.

In 2002, his first full-length came out which brought his desires together including Pop, electro, R&B, techno, house, and funk that came out on an autobiographical disc. He put together two albums "Detrevolution" (2005) and "Bittersoulfulsweet: The Aaron-Carl Experience" (2008).

His single "My House" was licensed by Josh Wink's label, Ovum Recordings, and became Ragland's first Billboard Top 40 Dance/Club hit. His music has been showcased in various feature films, most notably Maestro, a house music documentary by Josell Ramos, which featured original tracks "Sky" and "Oasis". He received more recognition overseas. Aaron wanted to pivot over to Pop but didn't want to mess anything up which motivated him to create "W.A.R.M.T.H" (We Are Revolutionizing the Movement of Techno and House). It was created to help Detroit artists get recognition from worldwide audiences, parties, tours and promotion campaigns.

His first Cherry Juice Recordings release, "Motion" (recorded and produced together with Laurent & Lewis) was elected "Best track" by Kevin Saunderson and Dave Clarke at the 2007 Amsterdam Dance Event.

Ragland appears in The Godfather Chronicles -- The Ghetto Tech Sound of Detroit. His remix of rapper Johnny Dangerous' "Topsy Turvy", in which Ragland makes a cameo appearance is featured in Pick Up the Mic, a documentary by Alex Hinton.

== Death ==
At the time Ragland died he was about to start a European tour. After his death, Detroit Techno Militia released a double album collection to remember him and keep his memories alive. Ragland died from lymphoma on September 30, 2010 in Detroit, Michigan.

== Discography ==
=== Albums ===
- Uncloseted (2002)
- Detrevolution (2005)
- Bittersoulfulsweet: The Aaron-Carl Experience (2008)
- Laurent & Lewis feat. Aaron-Carl - Motion (2008)

=== Selected singles/EPs ===
- "Wash It/Down" (1996)
- "Crucified" (1996)
- "Wallshaker" (1997)
- "Make Me Happy" (1997)
- "My House" (1998)
- "Down" (1998)
- "Closer" (1998)
- “Drama After Midnight, Vol. 1” (1999) (Aaron-Carl, HotwaxHarley, Maurice Fulton)
- "Dance Naked" (1999)
- "Soldier" (1999)
- "The Boot" (2001)
- "The Answer/Down" (2002)
- "Sky" (2003)
- "Switch" (2003)
- "Homoerotic" (2003)
- "Hateful" (2004)
- "Tears" (2006)
- Aaron-Carl & Benjamin Hayes - The Devolver EP (2007)
- If There Is A Heaven Remixes Vol. 1 (2008)
- Aaron-Carl Presents Erica LaFay (2009)
