= Richard Long (sound designer) =

American sound designer

Richard Long (1933–1986) was an American sound designer. He is known as the preeminent sound designer of the disco era, having installed systems at clubs including Paradise Garage, Dorian Gray, Studio 54, City Hall, Max's Kansas City and Roxy Roller Rink.

== Career ==
Richard Long initially worked for Alex Rosner, famous for his system installed at the Loft. Rosner would send Long to fix sound systems that were broken down, but eventually Long became a designer in his own right. Long's first nightclub was SoHo Place. In 1977, he designed the custom sound system for Paradise Garage. This system became his flagship. Long was known for his heavy bass sound. Nicky Siano described Long's sound as more "funky and down-home", compared to a more polished sound from Rosner's systems. Long also developed a J-Horn, a bass speaker cabinet designed to protect the lower frequencies.

Paradise Garage had a custom speaker, the "Levan Horn", designed to increase bass in the club, and named after DJ Larry Levan. The club was Long's showroom–he continued to maintain and tweak the design after it opened.

Over the course of his career, Long installed more than 300 systems. Locations included Copacabana, Directoire, the Ginza, the Limelight, Max's Kansas City, Studio 54, Area, Bonds International Casino, Club Zanzibar(Newark), The Box (Chicago), The Twilight Zone (Toronto) Ware House, Paradise Garage, and City Hall (Venezuela). In 1980, Long won the Billboard award for Best Disco Sound Design.

Long died of AIDS in 1986. The only surviving Richard Long soundsystems are at the Eldorado Bumper Car ride in Coney Island, NY. And SVN West in San Francisco, CA. Long was invited to install the system by the Eldorado's owner, Scott Fitlin.
