= Francis Grasso =

American DJ

- Born: Francis Grasso; March 25, 1948
- Origin: New York City, New York, US
- Died: March 20, 2001 (aged 52)
- Genres: Soul, Funk, Rock, R'n'B, Disco
- Occupation: DJ
- Years active: 1967–2001

Francis Grasso (March 25, 1948 – March 20, 2001) was an Italian American disco music disc jockey from New York City, best known for being one of the first people to beatmatch.

Grasso, who attended Brooklyn Technical High School and Long Island University, started his DJ career in 1967–1968 at New York nightclub Salvation II. When the primary DJ Terry Noel failed to show up on time one night, the owners offered Grasso a chance at the job. The crowd responded almost immediately and soon he had his first regular gig. It was there and at subsequent New York clubs such as Tarots and his most famous nightclub, Sanctuary — a former German Baptist church at 43rd Street & 9th Avenue (featured in the movie Klute) — where Grasso perfected his craft.

The key addition Grasso brought to DJ culture was music programming, or the art of picking up on the energy of the crowd and sending that energy right back to them via the next track. At his early Salvation II gigs Grasso used Rek-O-Kut direct drive turntables and a basic cross-fader. Initially he would change between records quickly, catching the rhythm of the current track by expertly starting the next record at the exact point he wanted. Later he used turntables with pitch controls, which allowed him to develop beatmatching, syncing the tempo of two records for an extended period while fading between them. He soon passed these techniques on to other DJs, including Michael Cappello and Steve D'Acquisto, which helped spread the style throughout New York City.

The skills and techniques he pioneered remain the foundation of what is heard in a modern nightclub. Francis was interviewed in Josell Ramos' 2003 feature-length documentary Maestro.

== Musical stylings ==
DJ Francis completely changed the game of Disco music. Before him, DJs submitted to what the patrons wanted, supplying recognizable music that would appeal to the crowd. Occasionally, DJs would add a different spin on top of these popular charts. DJ Francis was not interested in what the customers wanted, and instead provided a new, exotic array of songs, which the crowd would not have thought to ask for. He offered a full, creative performance with a narrative. He demonstrated to the DJs of later generations that the power belonged to them to create environmental moods, and that there were techniques for creating different atmospheres, and thus manipulating dancers.

His musical choices were also quite different from his predecessors. He played on the funkier side of rock music, using The Rolling Stones or Led Zeppelin on top of heavy black rhythms such as Dyke & The Blazers or Kool & The Gang. He introduced drum-heavy African sounds, and used Latin beats to entice people to dance, as well as James Brown and Motown (including The Four Tops, The Supremes, and the Temptations).

== Cultural significance ==
While DJing at the Sanctuary, a New York dance club known as "the first totally uninhibited gay discothèque in America," Grasso was known for the danceability of his musical work. On nights when he was DJing, doormen were known to stop counting entrances of audience members after they got to the thousands, even though the Sanctuary had a capacity of 346 people. Being a safe haven for newly sexually liberated gay men and women, DJ Francis's music was often seen as the backdrop for recreational drug usage and promiscuity. With his long-held position at the Sanctuary, Grasso was able to develop his musical techniques and ability to mesmerize crowds.

== Death ==
Grasso was found dead on March 23, 2001, at his home in Brooklyn. He was estimated to have died 3 days prior.

== Bibliography ==
- Goldman, Albert. Disco. New York: Hawthorne Books, 1979.
