= Paradise Garage =

Former discotheque in New York City

- "The Garage"

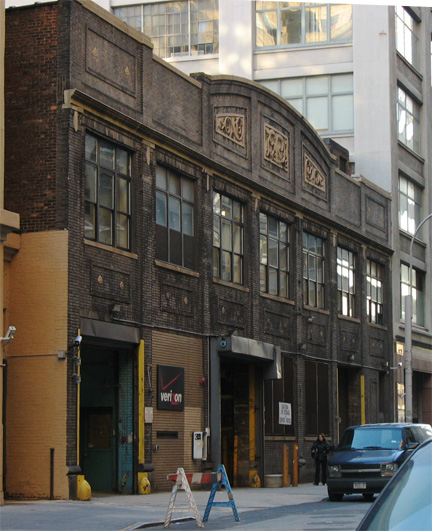
- Interactive map of Paradise Garage
- Address: 84 King Street; New York, New York; United States
- Coordinates: 40.72794°N 74.00645°W
- Operator: Michael Brody
- Capacity: 1,400
- Type: Nightclub
- Field size: 10,000 square feet (930 m^{2})

Construction
- Built: 1924 (as auto garage)
- Opened: January 28, 1978
- Closed: October 1, 1987
- Demolished: 2018
- Architect: Victor Mayper

Paradise Garage, also known as "the Garage" or the "Gay-rage", was a New York City discotheque notable in the history of dance and pop music, as well as LGBT and nightclub cultures. The 10,000 square feet (930 m^{2}) club was founded by sole proprietor Michael Brody, and occupied a building formerly located at 84 King Street in the SoHo neighborhood. It operated from 1977 to 1987 and featured resident DJ Larry Levan.

The Garage is credited with influencing the development of modern nightclubs, and is cited as a direct inspiration for London's Ministry of Sound. Unlike other venues of its time, Paradise Garage promoted dancing rather than verbal interaction, and it was the first to place the DJ at the center of attention. It was known for its enthusiastic-yet-unforgiving nature toward performers. It hosted many notable musicians including Diana Ross and a young Madonna. In 1979, Tim Curry released the album Fearless, containing the single "Paradise Garage", whose lyrics narrate visiting the discotheque.

== History ==
=== Physical space ===
Paradise Garage derived its name from the building's origin as an early automobile parking structure. Its initial certificate of occupancy, dated March 26, 1925, identifies the architect of the two-story commercial building at 80-86 King Street as Victor Mayper.

Michael Brody's imprint on the space began in 1977 with the club opening as 84 King Street Garage. After a year-long renovation, it officially became Paradise Garage on January 28, 1978. Among the improvements were a sprung dancefloor and custom sound system, developed by Richard Long of Richard Long & Associates (RLA). The club's main room layout and dancefloor were reportedly purpose-designed around the sound system, which is said to have been the best in New York City at that time and described by François Kevorkian as a "temple of music."

The venue initially accommodated 750 patrons for the original dance floor which was later turned into the front lounge/gray room/glass lounge but a 1978 expansion when the main dance floor opened raised its legal capacity to 1,400 people. Brody then added a rooftop lounge in 1984 styled after the coastal shrubland and beachside villas of the nearby Fire Island Pines, where Brody owned a summer home.

After 11 years of operation, The Garage's lease ended on October 1, 1987. The building later was adapted for use as a truck depot by Verizon Communications. In April 2018, it was demolished and replaced by high-rise luxury condominiums.

=== Culture ===
The Garage was largely modeled on David Mancuso's private invitation-only DJ parties at The Loft. Admission to the club was only available to members and their guests with an interview process used to select members. In order to avoid New York City restrictions on bar and restaurant hours-of-operation, snacks and beverages were freely available to patrons and no liquor was served. These measures allowed the club to stay open after hours, often until 10:00 AM or even later the following day.

In contrast to its well-known contemporary Studio 54, The Garage fostered a distinctly no-frills, egalitarian atmosphere, as reminisced by one of its former dancers:

You went there to dance, and we didn't dance like the regular people who were dancing in discos. I used to get dressed up to go to a disco, I'd do the Hustle for a couple hours till 4 o'clock in the morning, then I'd say, "Oh shit, lemme go to the Garage." I had my bag with me and go to the Garage and change into my sweatpants and my sneakers.

— Willie Dancer, in Paradise Garage: The oral history of NYC’s greatest club

The club hosted a number of charity events, benefiting organizations like Gay Men's Health Crisis (GMHC) and U.S. Fund for UNICEF. As of 2008, the Paradise Garage trademark is owned by GMHC.

=== Music ===
Paradise Garage was an epicenter for early pioneers of dance music under the curation of resident DJ Larry Levan. The unique and eclectic styles of disco and dance music featured at the Garage gave rise to descriptive encompassing terms like New York house, "garage", "garage style", and "garage classic" (to describe a record that was made famous at, or associated with, the club).

Although the term "garage music" (not to be confused with UK garage) does not exclusively mean house music, the latter saw extensive development and promotion among Levan and his contemporaries, Frankie Knuckles and Nicky Siano. Nonetheless, these DJ's played all kinds of music at Paradise Garage so long as it was danceable; for example, The Clash and The Police, as well as traditional "disco" artists like Gwen Guthrie and Sylvester.

Among those who benefited from what became known as "The Garage Sound" or "Garage Music" was Mel Cheren, a partial backer of the club and owner of New York label West End Records. West End's successes included such hits as "Sessomatto" by Sessa Matto, "Hot Shot" by Karen Young, "Heartbeat" by Taana Gardner (remixed by Levan), "Do It to the Music" by Raw Silk, and "Don't Make Me Wait" by the Peech Boys (produced by Levan). West End Records folded for a number of years, then re-opened in the late 1990s and released one of Levan's DJ sets recorded live at the Garage.

==== Paradise Garage Top 100 ====
In the 2000 book Last Night A DJ Saved My Life by Bill Brewster and Frank Broughton, a chart was detailed that listed the "Top 100" of the Paradise Garage, selected by "The Committee", ostensibly detailing the hundred most iconic tracks associated with the club.

Artist	Song	Year of Release
Affinity	"Don't Go Away"	1983
Carl Bean	"I Was Born This Way"	1977
Hamilton Bohannon	"Let's Start The Dance"	1978
Dee Dee Bridgewater	"Bad for Me"	1979
James Brown	"Give It Up Or Turnit A Loose"	1969
Peter Brown	"Do Ya Wanna Get Funky with Me"	1977
Central Line	"Walking Into Sunshine"	1981
Chicago	"Street Player"	1979
The Chi-Lites	"My First Mistake"	1977
Chocolette	"It's That East Street Beat"	1985
The Clash	"The Magnificent Dance"	1981
Company B	"Fascinated"	1987
Dinosaur L	"Go Bang! #5"	1982
D Train	"You're the One for Me"	1981
Ian Dury	"Spasticus Autisticus"	1981
Brian Eno and David Byrne	"The Jezebel Spirit"	1981
ESG	"Moody"	1981
ESG	"Standing In Line"	1984
Marianne Faithfull	"Why D'Ya Do It"	1979
Family Tree	"Family Tree"	1975
Fingers Inc.	"Mystery of Love"	1986
First Choice	"Let No Man Put Asunder"	1983
First Choice	"Double Cross"	1979
Frontline Orchestra	"Don't Turn Your Back On Me"	1982
Taana Gardner	"Heartbeat"	1981
Manuel Göttsching	E2-E4	1984
Eddy Grant	"Living on the Front Line"	1979
Eddy Grant	"Nobody's Got Time/Time Warp"	1980
Gwen Guthrie	"Seventh Heaven"	1985
Gwen Guthrie	"Padlock"	1985
Loleatta Holloway	"Love Sensation"	1980
Loleatta Holloway	"Hit And Run"	1977
Ednah Holt	"Serious, Sirius Space Party"	1981
Thelma Houston	"I'm Here Again"	1978
Imagination	"Just an Illusion"	1982
Inner Life	"Ain't No Mountain High Enough"	1981
Instant Funk	"I Got My Mind Made Up (You Can Get It Girl)"	1978
The Jackson 5	"I Am Love"	1974
Mick Jagger	"Lucky in Love"	1985
Marshall Jefferson	"Move Your Body"	1985
Grace Jones	"Slave to the Rhythm"	1985
Grace Jones	"Pull Up to the Bumper"	1981
Tamiko Jones	"Can't Live Without Your Love"	1979
Kebekelektrik	"War Dance"	1978
Eddie Kendricks	"Girl You Need a Change of Mind"	1972
Chaka Khan	"Clouds"	1980
Chaka Khan	"I Know You, I Live You"	1981
Klein + M.B.O.	"Dirty Talk"	1982
Kraftwerk	"The Robots"	1978
Labelle	"What Can I Do for You?"	1974
Patti LaBelle	"The Spirit's in It"	1981
Lace	"Can't Play Around"	1982
Loose Joints	"Is It All Over My Face"	1980
M	"Pop Muzik"	1979
Man Friday	"Love Honey, Love Heartache"	1986
Martin Circus	"Disco Circus"	1979
MFSB	"Love Is the Message"	1977
Steve Miller Band	"Macho City"	1981
Modern Romance	"Salsa Rapsody"	1981
Melba Moore	"You Stepped into My Life"	1978
Alicia Myers	"I Want To Thank You"	1981
New York Citi Peech Boys	"Life Is Something Special"	1982
Stevie Nicks	"Stand Back"	1983
Nitro Deluxe	"Let's Get Brutal"	1987
North End featuring Michelle Wallace	"Tee's Happy"	1981
Nu Shooz	"I Can't Wait"	1986
Yoko Ono	"Walking on Thin Ice"	1981
Peech Boys	"Don't Make Me Wait"	1982
Phreek	"Weekend"	1978
Pleasure	"Take A Chance"	1979
The Police	"Voices Inside My Head"	1980
Sharon Ridley	"Changin'"	1976
Alexander Robotnick	"Problemes d'Amour"	1983
Rockers Revenge featuring Donnie Calvin	"Walking On Sunshine"	1982
Diana Ross	"Love Hangover"	1976
Diana Ross	"No One Gets the Prize"	1979
The Salsoul Orchestra	"Ooh, I Love It (Love Break)"	1983
Sister Sledge	"Lost in Music"	1978
Sister Sledge	"We Are Family"	1978
Sparque	"Let's Go Dancin'"	1981
Cat Stevens	"Was Dog A Doughnut?"	1977
Nick Straker Band	"A Little Bit of Jazz"	1981
The Strikers	"Body Music"	1981
The Sugarhill Gang	"Rapper's Delight"	1979
Donna Summer	"I Feel Love"	1977
Sylvester	"I Need Someone To Love Tonight"	1979
Sylvester	"Over And Over"	1977
Syreeta	"Can't Shake Your Love"	1981
Talking Heads	"I Zimbra"	1979
Talking Heads	"Once in a Lifetime"	1980
Tom Tom Club	"Genius of Love"	1981
Touch	"Without You"	1987
T.W. Funkmasters	"Love Money"	1980
Two Tons O' Fun	"I Got The Feeling"	1980
Two Tons O' Fun	"Just Us"	1980
Visual	"The Music Got Me"	1983
Will Powers	"Adventures In Success"	1983
Womack & Womack	"Baby I'm Scared Of You"	1984
Yazoo	"Situation"	1982
Yello	"Bostich"	1981

== Performers ==
Notable performers who have played at Paradise Garage include:

- 2 Puerto Ricans, a Blackman, and a Dominican
- Colonel Abrams
- Noel Pagan
- Gayle Adams
- Patti Austin
- Baltimora
- B. B. & Q. Band
- Claudja Barry
- Carl Bean
- Celi Bee
- Taka Boom
- Pattie Brooks
- Jocelyn Brown
- Miquel Brown
- Peter Brown
- Sharon Brown
- C-Bank
- Camille
- Cheyne
- Linda Clifford
- Natalie Cole
- Willie Colón
- Company B
- The Cover Girls
- Tim Curry
- E.G. Daily
- Sarah Dash
- Taylor Dayne
- Cory Daye
- Divine
- D. Train
- Duran Duran
- ESG
- First Choice
- Samantha Fox
- Marshall Jefferson
- Freeez
- Taana Gardner
- Siedah Garrett
- Gary's Gang
- Gloria Gaynor
- Georgio
- Gwen Guthrie
- Curtis Hairston
- Hanson & Davis
- Keith Haring
- Dan Hartman
- Nona Hendryx
- Jennifer Holliday
- Loleatta Holloway
- Thelma Houston
- Whitney Houston
- Al Hudson
- Rhetta Hughes
- Phyllis Hyman
- Imagination
- James Ingram
- The It
- Debbie Jacobs
- Peter Jacques band
- France Joli
- Grace Jones
- The Jones Girls
- Kid Creole and the Coconuts
- Madleen Kane
- Chaka Khan
- Evelyn 'Champagne' King
- Fern Kinney
- Jean Knight
- Konk
- George Kranz
- Patti LaBelle
- Cyndi Lauper
- Amanda Lear
- Paul Lekakis
- Lime
- Lisa Lisa and Cult Jam
- Loose Ends
- Cheryl Lynn
- Madonna (who also filmed her first music video, "Everybody", here)
- Nancy Martinez
- Hugh Masekela
- Janice McClain
- Stephanie Mills
- Melba Moore
- Meli'sa Morgan
- Mr. Fingers
- Alicia Myers
- Nayobe
- New Order
- Klaus Nomi
- Nu Shooz
- Odyssey
- Dennis Parker
- Paul Parker
- Peech Boys
- Bonnie Pointer
- The Pointer Sisters
- Positive Force
- Quando Quango
- Fonda Rae
- Sheryl Lee Ralph
- Sharon Redd
- The Ritchie Family
- Barbara Roy
- Diana Ross
- Arthur Russell
- Sinitta
- Sister Sledge
- Frankie Smith
- Stacey Q
- Brenda K. Starr
- Candi Staton
- Amii Stewart
- Sybil
- Sylvester
- The System
- Evelyn Thomas
- Tasha Thomas
- Judy Torres
- Liz Torres
- Unlimited Touch
- Luther Vandross
- Táta Vega
- Was (Not Was)
- Jody Watley
- The Weather Girls
- Wham!
- Deniece Williams
- Precious Wilson
- Betty Wright
- Syreeta Wright
- Yaz
- Karen Young

== In popular culture ==
=== Tribute events ===
- On May 11, 2014, in an event organized by Red Bull Music Academy, former Paradise Garage DJ David Depino, his fellow Paradise Garage alum Joey Llanos, and the dance music DJ François Kevorkian paid tribute to both the Paradise Garage and the late Larry Levan with a block party located on the street outside the club's former entrance. The event was coordinated with an effort to rename the King Street block Larry Levan Way and featured songs considered Garage classics, some DJ'd, some of which were sung live by Jocelyn Brown, who appeared onstage to deliver such favorites as "I'm Caught Up (In a One Night Love Affair)" and "Ain't No Mountain High Enough."
- From May 24 to September 22, 2019, the New York Historical Society's Stonewall 50 Exhibition displayed the original Paradise Garage metal sign from the disco's original building, which was a parking garage. Credits also on display read: "Paradise Garage (1976-1987) Dennis Wunderlin (b. 1943), designer. Exterior sign, ca. 1977. Metal, paint. Fales Library and Special Collections, New York University, New York, NY".
- On June 22, 2022, Victor Rosado held a Tribute to Paradise Garage and Larry Levan at the Lincoln Center for the Performing Arts in New York City.

=== Tribute sites ===
Multiple tribute sites are dedicated to the Paradise Garage, such as paradisegargenyc.com and TheParadiseGarage.net.

=== Tribute movies ===
Several documentary films have been made regarding the venue and its history. The feature-length film Maestro focused on the Paradise Garage and its patrons. Jonathon Ullman directed a 15-minute short documentary in 2014 titled What is the Paradise Garage?, with plans to produce a drama film about the club to star Kobna Holdbrook-Smith as Levan, and listing Depino as an associate producer, announced in 2016. Its expected release was in 2017. In 2019, the DJ Corrado Rizza directed and produced a documentary movie called Larry's Garage.

The significance of the Paradise Garage to the history of disco music is discussed in Episode 3 of the 2024 PBS series Disco: Soundtrack of a Revolution.

== See also ==
- Le Palace, Superclub
- LGBT culture in New York City
- List of electronic dance music venues
- List of nightclubs in New York City
- Prelude Records
- Salsoul Records
- Club Zanzibar
- The Shelter (New York City)
