= Steve D'Acquisto =

American DJ and record producer

Steve D'Acquisto (1943–2001) was an American disco DJ and record producer.

He started the concept of the record pool with David Mancuso, Paul Casella and Vince Aletti in 1975 in New York City.

D'Acquisto also collaborated with Arthur Russell in the disco group Loose Joints.
