= Joe Siano =

Joe Siano was the vocalist for the psychedelic rock band the Head Shop, which released an album on Epic Records in 1969.

In 1972, together with his better-known younger brother – Nicky Siano – they opened The Gallery, a landmark disco in New York during the early 1970s. Nicky Siano was later a resident DJ at the famed Studio 54 disco in New York.
