= Colleen 'Cosmo' Murphy =

American DJ (born 1968)

Colleen Murphy
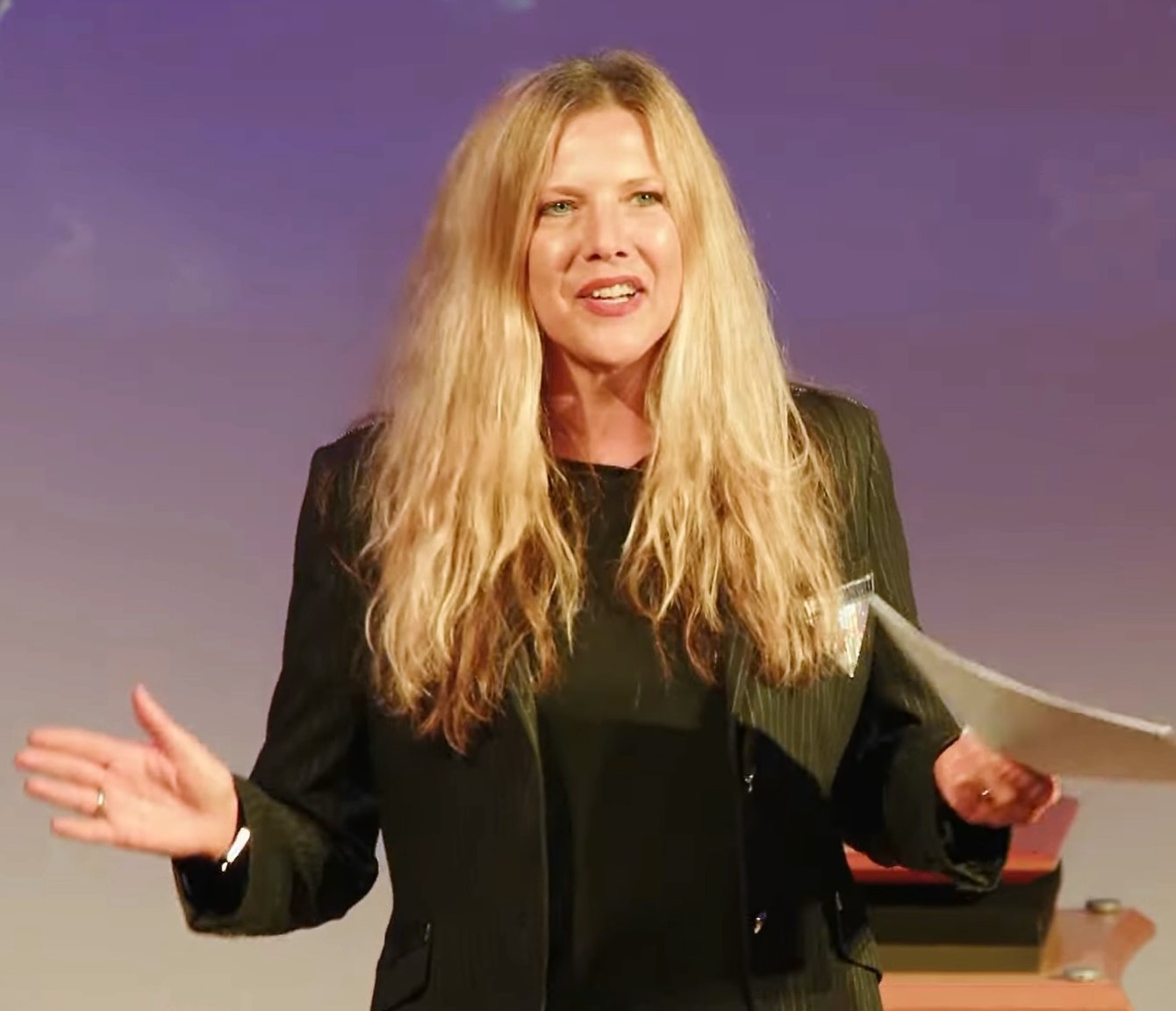
- Murphy at the British Library in 2022

Background information
- Also known as: Cosmo
- Origin: Massachusetts, United States
- Occupations: Radio broadcaster, DJ, music producer
- Website: https://colleencosmomurphy.com/

Colleen "Cosmo" Murphy is an American DJ, radio host and curator, audiophile, and founder of the album listening event and content hub Classic Album Sundays. She is often called on to speak about vinyl records.

== Radio career ==
Originally from Massachusetts, United States, Colleen Murphy attended New York University, where she was program director and a DJ at the university radio station WNYU.

Murphy has been a radio host, DJ and programme director since the age of fourteen and today hosts Cosmodelica and Classic Album Sundays Worldwide on Worldwide FM and 'This Women's Work' series for Public Radio International. Cosmodelica was selected by Time Out as one of the 10 best shows in London.

Murphy is the writer and host of BBC 6 Music's album series "Sounds of a City" and BBC Radio 4's documentary series "Turntable Tales".

Unfold Japan, a radio series she hosted for Worldwide FM and Asahi, was nominated for an ARIA Award in the 2020 Audio and Radio Industry Awards for Best Branded Content.

== DJ career ==
Murphy was mentored by David Mancuso at his seminal Loft parties in New York City and became one of his most trusted friends and artistic collaborators. Together they co-produced the compilation series David Mancuso Presents The Loft Volumes One and Two, and worked together on David's record label The Loft Audiophile Library of Music. In 2000, David told Time Out New York City "She is very devoted and very pure about the music. She’s one of the only people I would trust, both with the music and with the equipment, to fill in for me." She was asked by David to help manage his legacy and continues to be one of the musical hosts at The Loft in NYC.

Murphy is also the co-founder of the Lucky Cloud Loft parties in London which she co-founded with Mancuso and friends and DJs internationally on the world's best sound systems and dance floors.

In 2019 Murphy was nominated in the DJ Mag North America Hall of Fame and launched Love Dancin' Sound System with Trojan Sound System's Daddy Ad at Gilles Peterson's We Out Here festival, sharing some of her musical and sonic passions to dancers outside of her existing communities.

Murphy was featured in Disco: Soundtrack of a Revolution, a 2024 BBC and PBS co-production and three-part documentary about the rise of disco music in the 1970s.

== Music production career ==
As a producer Murphy has remixed Róisín Murphy, the Rapture, Fat Freddy's Drop, Beardyman, Candi Staton, the 2 Bears, Phenomenal Handclap Band, Cantoma, Horace Andy, Chaka Khan and more under her Cosmodelica moniker and as DarkStarr Diskotek (with Ashley Beedle). Along with former Captain Beefheart guitarist Gary Lucas, she recorded and produced as Wild Rumpus.

She has also mixed her own compilations – New York Afterhours: A Later Shade of Deep (Nervous Records 1998), The Disco-Tech of DJ Cosmo (Yellow Productions 2003) and Psychedelic Disco-Tech: They Live by the Night as Darkstarr with Ashley Beedle.

== Classic Album Sundays ==
Murphy's Classic Album Sundays platform tells the stories behind the albums that have shaped our culture and in some cases, our lives. She founded it as a stance against the increasing devaluation of music and sound. What began as a passion project is now the world's most popular album listening event with satellites in four continents and the website and social media channels host content on classic albums and artists such as interviews, videos, playlists and more. BBC Breakfast Television remarked, "Classic Album Sundays treat our best loved records like great symphonies."

Murphy and Classic Album Sundays are one of the leading pioneers and inspirations behind the resurgence of vinyl, listening venues and high quality sound.

Murphy has hosted events with talent such as Jarvis Cocker, Guy Garvey, Laura Mvula, Max Richter, John Grant, Pink Floyd's Nick Mason, KT Tunstall, Jazzie B, Sister Sledge, Lisa Stansfield, Elizabeth Fraser, Thurston Moore, and many more.
