= Promotional recording =

Audio or video recording distributed free, for promotional purposes

A promotional recording, promotional single, promo, or plug copy is an audio or video recording distributed free, usually in order to promote a recording that is or soon will be commercially available. Promos are normally sent directly to broadcasters, such as music radio and television stations, and to tastemakers, such as DJs, music journalists, and critics, in advance of the release of commercial editions, in the hope that airplay, reviews, and other forms of exposure will result and stimulate the public's interest in the commercial release.

Promos are often distributed in plain packaging, without the text or artwork that appears on the commercial version. Typically a promo is marked with some variation of the following text: "Licensed for promotional use only. Sale is prohibited." It may also state that the promo is still the property of the distributor and is to be "returned upon demand." However, it is not illegal to sell promotional recordings, and recalls of promos are extremely rare and unenforced. A promotional release may be standalone or as part of a press kit, which may include items such as promotional photos, music videos, press releases, or biographies of the artists, with electronic press kits being common.

Because promos are produced in smaller quantity than releases made available to the general public, they are sometimes considered valuable collector's items. They are never intended for sale in record stores.

== Single ==
A promotional single is a single that is made available to radio stations, nightclubs, music publications, and other media outlets by a record label to promote a commercial single or album. A song may be released as a promotional single even if no commercial version of the single is available to buy. An example is "Theme to St. Trinian's" by Girls Aloud, released as a promotional single for the movie St. Trinian's. The song was later removed as a single to avoid confusion with Girls Aloud's actual single "Call the Shots". Another example is the Stevie Wonder song "Isn't She Lovely" which was written about his newborn daughter, Aisha Morris. As Wonder was unwilling to cut the nearly 7 minute song down, Motown made their own 3:20 version available to radio stations.

The promo single is usually recognized by its limited liner notes and cover artwork as well as its unique catalog number (or the occasional lack thereof). Quite often, vinyl records will be issued in a generic cardboard jacket or white paper sleeve while CDs will be issued in a slimline jewel case or cardboard sleeve.

There may also be promotion-specific terms stamped on the disc or its cover, most notably "For Promotional Use Only" and "Not For Resale".

The advance promo single is furnished to DJs sometimes weeks or months in advance of a domestic release to give record labels an opportunity to build interest in the single and gauge response to the single. Unlike a finished promo single, these are commonly test pressings or white labels and thus are manufactured in limited runs. Traditionally, these promotional copies were supplied to DJs through music pools. Despite the good intention, there has been some dispute within the industry whether an advanced promotion is a good thing or not. Building interest is naturally considered a good thing, but it may have the opposite effect when interested persons are unable to find a new song in the record stores for quite some time.

== Acetates and test pressings ==
On rare occasions a special type of demonstration record known as an acetate disc has been distributed to radio stations as a promo. Instead of being mass-produced these records are cut one at a time in the recording studio from a master tape source. They were generally made in very low quantity with hand-written labels. The soft acetate surface of these discs can be played no more than about 10 times before they start to wear out.

Another type of rare item which has occasionally been used as a promo is a "test pressing" or white label record. These are the first disc copies pressed at the factory. They are used to check manufacturing quality before mass production begins.

== Distribution ==
=== Radio outlets ===
Promotional recordings are distributed to commercial AM and FM radio stations for airplay. These singles typically feature just the radio edit of the song, but may also include alternate remix edits, the original album version, or even call-out hooks.

=== Nightclub outlets ===
When it comes to electronic dance music, 12-inch records and CDs still have been replaced by digital music files (such as MP3 or MP4) as the most popular media by which promotional recordings may be distributed to DJs in the nightclub industry. These singles typically feature one or more extended remixes (sometimes dubbed a "club mix") of the title track that are not generally available to the public as well as the original extended version, which in many cases is itself club-friendly. In some cases, the release may have anonymous track labeling or lack labels altogether. Previously, the corresponding CD might also have carried radio edits and other alternate cuts that did not make it onto the 12-inch record itself, in which case the CD is referred to as a maxi-single CD. It is not unusual for a promo single to have no commercially available counterpart particularly in those genres that are predominantly oriented to nightclub applications.

=== Promotional compilations ===
Many companies currently offer promotional compilations to DJs, radio use and nightclubs alike. The format is growing on the CD format, but some companies still offer promotional compilations in vinyl also. Most of the compilations are genre-specific (like most of CD Pools' compilations) but there are also compilations that offer a combination of different genres (like compilations from DMC and Music Factory). Such compilations are normally released monthly. In addition to companies that work internationally, there are also many companies that offer national promotions material in the form of compilations.

Versions in the compilation are usually either radio edits or extended / 12" remixes of the song, depending a bit on the targeted audience. Club scene music is usually in the longer and easier to play format of extended remix, whereas more street targeted music is usually released as radio edits. It normally takes a couple of weeks after the release of the original promo single to be available on promotional compilations. This has the added benefit of having the songs when they are already had some airtime and are thus not the bleeding edge no-one has heard from, but still have usually not been released to the mass markets yet.

Some of the internationally established companies are CD Pool and DMC. Many fledgling companies are also available offering both well-known and lesser known releases.

=== Online promotional distribution ===
Since the advent of broad-bandwidth Internet access and professional tools such as iPool or Haulix, the online promotional distribution of music has been established. Record companies make their music available as audio files and use the Internet as a distribution channel. In contrast to the conventional way of distributing promotional recordings, this kind of promotional distribution is faster and cheaper.

== See also ==
- Press kit
