= David Depino =

American DJ

- Other names: D DeP, D. Depino
- Occupation: Disc jockey

David Depino is an American nightclub disc jockey known for his DJ work at nightclubs like the Paradise Garage and the Chelsea, Manhattan club Tracks.

Depino is also known for his DJ work with disc jockey Larry Levan.

== Early life and career ==
Depino was born the son Italian-American parents.

Years later as a closeted teenager, on the day of June 28, 1969, Depino was with a friend walking around Greenwich Village when hours later, the Stonewall riots happened, which many believed was the genesis of the LGBTQ+ rights movement. Depino wanted to tell everyone that he had been right outside the riots yet did not. Depino never came out as gay to his parents.

After working at a gay discotheque called The Sanctuary, Depino landed a job at the Paradise Garage dance club working with disc jockey Larry Levan. Depino originally never wanted to be a DJ yet Levan needed someone to open for him. Depino and Levan would end up becoming best friends.

Depino is featured in the BBC documentary series Disco: Soundtrack of a Revolution.
