= West End Records =

American music record label

- Parent company: Verse Music Group (BMG Rights Management)
- Founded: 1976
- Founder: Mel Cheren
- Distributor(s): Universal Music Group (physical); BMG Rights Management (digital)
- Genre: Electro, disco, soul, garage house, boogie, hip hop
- Country of origin: U.S.
- Location: New York City

West End Records is an American music record label based in New York City. Led by co-founder Mel Cheren, West End was one of the most prominent labels in dance music's history, along with Prelude Records, Salsoul Records, and Casablanca Records. West End Records helped introduce the twelve-inch single, the vinyl format popularized by disco music in the 1970s and promoted the nascent garage house music pioneered by DJ Larry Levan in Paradise Garage. West End Records was acquired by Verse music group in 2010. On June 29, 2015, Verse Music was acquired by BMG Rights Management.

== History ==
It was founded by Mel Cheren and Ed Kushins in 1976 and the label went on to define the sound of New York City in the heyday of disco. That sound eventually filtered to dance floors and clubs across the country and around the world. West End released disco hits like Taana Gardner's "Heartbeat"(1979), Karen Young's "Hot Shot," Loose Joints' "Is It All Over My Face," Barbara Mason's "Another Man," and The NYC Peech Boys' "Don't Make Me Wait”. These titles, along with many others in the West End Records catalog, went on to become some of the most sampled songs in music history. Label released Bombers and DJ Nori also.

In 1992, a UK music production and remix team called West End produced numerous UK #1 Club Chart hits influenced by the style of the West End Records label and associated Garage sound.

Samples of West End Records' titles appear in productions of million selling artists: Treacherous Three, De La Soul, Jennifer Lopez, Notorious B.I.G, Ja Rule, Ini Kamoze, DMX and many others. West End's music is found in such films as "The Cookout" (Lions Gate Films, 2004), "Honey" (Universal Pictures, 2003), "Loving Jezebel" (Shooting Gallery, 1999), "Reversal of Fortune" (Warner Bros, 1990) and much more. West End's music has also been featured on such television programs as "The Ellen DeGeneres Show", "Queer Eye for the Straight Girl", and "Showtime at the Apollo".

The label released such hits as

- Taana Gardner – "Heartbeat"(1979)
- Karen Young – "Hot Shot"
- Barbara Mason – "Another Man"
- Loose Joints – "Is It All Over My Face?"
- Raw Silk - "Do It To The Music"
- The New York Citi Peech Boys – "Don't Make Me Wait"

The Godfather of Disco is a 2006 feature-length documentary based on Mel Cheren's autobiography, My Life and the Paradise Garage: Keep On Dancin directed by Gene Graham and produced by Determined Pictures.

== See also ==
- Prelude Records
- Salsoul Records
