= Peech Boys =

Band

- Origin: New York
- Genres: Garage, house, boogie
- Years active: 1980–1984, 1996
- Labels: Island, West End
- Past members: Bernard Fowler; Steven Brown; Robert Kasper; Darryl Short; Larry Levan; Michael de Benedictus

The Peech Boys, also known as the New York Citi Peech Boys or NYC Peech Boys, was a band that was composed of Bernard Fowler, Steven Brown, Robert Kasper, Darryl Short, Larry Levan, and Michael de Benedictus. The group formed at the Paradise Garage, being influenced by Larry Levan. The group only released four 12" discs with "On a Journey" peaking at #56 in the 1983 US Hot R&B/Hip-Hop Songs chart. However, the band is best known for its 1982 song "Don't Make Me Wait", which was one of the early hits in the New York house/garage scene, due to Levan's playing it at the Paradise Garage. "Don't Make Me Wait" was its only UK Singles Chart entry, peaking at #49 in November 1982. The group was signed to the West End Records label, then were picked up by Island Records, but in 1984, the group split up.

== Discography ==
=== Albums ===
- Life Is Something Special (Island/Atlantic 90094, 1983)

=== Singles ===
Year	Song	Peak chart positions		
Year	Song	US Dance	US R&B	UK
1982	"Don't Make Me Wait"	6	89	49
1983	"Life Is Something Special"	12	74	—
1983	"On a Journey"	―	56	―
1983	"Dance Sister (Biofeedback)"	31	―	—
1984	"Come On, Come On (Don't Say Maybe)"	15	—	—
1984	"This Magic Feeling"	—	—	—
1996	"Stay with Me"	—	—	—
"—" denotes releases that did not chart or were not released in that territory.
