= Jephté Guillaume =

- Origin: Haiti / Brooklyn, U.S.
- Genres: Electronic; garage house; house; Haitian music
- Occupation(s): Music producer, DJ, bassist, multi-instrumentalist, actor, vocalist
- Years active: 1994–present

Jephté Guillaume is a Haitian-born DJ, bassist, multi-instrumentalist and vocalist from Brooklyn whose signature Haitian folk song-infused house music was signed and promoted by the New York-based Spiritual Life Music brand. His Tèt Kale sound combines acoustic grooves with electronica.

== Career ==
From 1994 to present, Guillaume has released two albums and about two dozen singles.

Joe Claussell's Spiritual Life label released Guillaume's debut album Voyage of Dreams in 1999 in the US but the album had already been released in France and Japan since 1998. The release was noted by Billboard magazine. Critics such as the Washington Post noted the boldness of a double disc debut album sung entirely in Haitian Creole, mixing house and rich orchestra instrumentation.

In the summer of 1999, Guillaume and his Tèt Kale orchestra appeared in a Body & Soul house party and performance co-sponsored by the HMV entertainment retailer at Central Park Summerstage. The event had been put together by resident Body & Soul DJ's Claussell, François Kevorkian and Danny Krivit. Its goal was to showcase the budding multicultural New York house scene, integrating DJ/club culture with world music from Latin America, the Caribbean and Africa. 12,000 people attended and Guillaume's picture singing onstage wearing loose all-white clothing reminiscent of a vodou priest and a Haitian peasant hat, arms open wide, guitar hanging across his body, appeared in Billboard magazine's piece on the event. An announcement for the event had appeared in The New York Times' Pop and Jazz guide, calling it a "brave experiment".

Guillaume's music inspired Claussell's own album and Guillaume was part of a team associated with Claussell who worked together on many productions.

In October 1999, Guillaume opened at Irving Plaza for a Zap Mama concert reviewed by The New York Times. The performance exhibited Haitian Vodou dance, drumming and chanting and showcased songs from his album Voyage of Dreams. The Times noted the African, Haitian traditional rhythms, Afro beats and house influences.
