= Nicky Siano =

- Born: Nicky Siano; March 18, 1955 (age 71)
- Origin: Brooklyn, New York, U.S.
- Genres: Disco; Hi-NRG
- Occupations: Remixer, DJ, producer
- Years active: 1971–present

Nicky Siano (born March 18, 1955, in Brooklyn, New York) is a former resident DJ at Studio 54.

== Biography ==
In 1971, aged 16, Siano got his first DJing gig at The Roundtable. In February 1972, aged 17, he opened The Gallery in Chelsea, Manhattan with his older brother Joe Siano. New York Magazine called it "one of the five most visually breathtaking nightspots of our time". The Gallery was, alongside David Mancuso's Loft and Paradise Garage one of the three most important clubs in the 70's New York underground disco scene. Both Larry Levan and Frankie Knuckles worked there before starting DJing. Knuckles said that he and Levan "spent a lot of the time hanging out in the booth, watching Nicki's every move. He pretty much taught us what we were doing."

When Steve Rubell opened Studio 54, he asked Siano to be one of its resident DJs, to which he agreed, while remaining at The Gallery at weekends. Siano DJed at Bianca Jagger's infamous Studio 54 birthday party, and was playing as Bianca Jagger entered on a white horse. He was known for playing underground alternative music as opposed to the disco hits that were dominating the nightclub scene.

Siano was fired from Studio 54 after four months, due to excessive drug use. He claims that he was fired because Rubell 'wanted the club to be the star and not the DJ'.

In 1977, Siano went into production with the single "Kiss Me Again" on Sire Records, co-written and produced with Arthur Russell, which sold more than 300,000 records.

Siano dropped out of the scene around the start of the 1980s. He recounted to The Sydney Morning Herald that in 1982, he became sober, his best friend died of AIDS, and he "wound up in a 15-year career helping people with AIDS".

Siano's release Power of Love, featuring Arline Burton, was launched at the 2007 Winter Music Conference. Siano also released a film in the 2010s, Love Is the Message: A Night at the Gallery, documenting The Gallery disco and nightclub, with footage shot in the club during the 1970s.

On October 18, 2011, Siano reappeared at Studio 54 for the club's one-night reopening, organized by Sirius XM Radio, and played 1970s disco from the club's original days.

Siano is featured in the 2024 BBC/PBS series Disco: Soundtrack of a Revolution.
