= Music pool =

A music pool or DJ record pool is a regionalized and centralized method of music distribution that allows DJs (disc jockeys) to receive promotional music to play in nightclubs and other events such as weddings, festivals and on the radio. Record labels worldwide send their newest releases to the pool of DJs; in exchange, the pool provides feedback on each release as well as exposure in the clubs and other venues they play in. DJs typically pay a monthly subscription to join the service provided by these record pools. Music pools originated as vinyl record pools in 1974 New York City, evolved into CD distribution networks, and later online music distribution between DJs (digital pools). A music pool may have a "brick and mortar" office or may be entirely virtualized.

== Origins ==
The first record pool was created in 1975 by frustrated disco DJs in New York City. Record labels were only providing promotional copies to top DJs. After a shambolic meeting in May with industry representatives, the DJs decided to meet on their own. The first meeting was held at The Loft's second location on June 2. Attendees included Walter Gibbons, David Mancuso, Larry Levan, Tee Scott, and many others. The group drafted a "Declaration of Intent" to "be a self-service, self-regulated, independent calm center which will act as a point of exchange between record companies and discotheque DJs." Membership cost $2.

DJs would fill out feedback sheets for the record companies recording their opinions of a promotional recording and its reaction on the floor. The Record Pool became an efficient distribution mechanism for record labels and an informal union for DJs.

The initial Record Pool disbanded in 1977. By then, the model was widespread with over 30 pools. Labels would often ship copies to the roughly 3,500 DJs in these pools. The cost could be $5–8,000 per release, and labels often felt they did not get sufficient feedback from DJs in the pools. Salsoul Records decided it was more effective to reduce their pool distribution from 3,000 copies to 400, targeting DJs they knew would promote their releases.

In 1978, DJs created a National Record Pool Association with four regions. There were local groups like the Philadelphia Organization of Professional Spinners, Greater Pittsburgh Record Pool, Chicago's Dogs of War, and the Bay Area Disco Deejays Association. The Florida Record Pool had over 100 members. One of the common issues was the availability of records in the pool and tensions with club owners, who pressed for records to come to them instead of DJs.

Record pools and music promoters largely determined which songs were played in clubs and on radio. Afrika Bambaataa credited pool membership for amplifying his eclecticism, which was a pivotal influence on early hip-hop.

== Evolution ==
Largely used in the United States, the promotional pool system has never really been established outside of that country. The number of record pools peaked about 150 regional organizations during the 1980s and 1990s, but that number dropped off steadily during the shift from vinyl records to CDs then to digital formats.

The broad term "music pool" eventually arose, reflecting the advancing state of music distribution technology and the shrinking number of vinyl promotional releases, shifts that have caused pools to undergo major transformations in membership and in nature.

There are approximately a dozen remaining music pools in operation as of 2017, which collectively produce a monthly chart of their most popular distributed music (Published in DJ Times Magazine). Almost all remaining music pools now provide product to their members in digital format exclusively.

Record pools continue on today as a modern promotional channel used by the biggest record labels around the world to target the vast amount of DJs worldwide. They also act as a tool for individual DJs to release their own productions to the record pool, assisting their careers and helping them gain exposure to the general public.

They have also evolved into a business that has their own team of in-house producers, remixers, and editors that release music into the DJ community through the record pool's networks.

Many have also adapted to the modern/digital age and post regular content providing the DJ community with DJ related news and advice on how to begin a DJ career.
