= Vince Aletti =

American curator, writer and critic (born 1945)

- Born: 1945 (age 80–81)
- Occupations: Curator, writer, photography critic
- Employer: The New Yorker

Vince Aletti (born 1945) is a curator, writer, and photography critic.

== Career ==
=== Music industry ===
Aletti was a contributing writer for Rolling Stone from 1970 to 1989. He was the first person to write about disco, on 13 September 1973, in Discotheque Rock '72: Paaaaarty! an article published by the magazine. He gave a negative review to Funkadelic's Maggot Brain in 1971, describing it as "a shattered, desolate landscape with few pleasures," competently performed but "limited." He was particularly critical of the record's second side, panning it as "dead-end stuff," and asked "who needs this shit?"

He also wrote a weekly column about disco for the music trade magazine Record World (1974–1979), and reported about early clubs like David Mancuso's The Loft for The Village Voice in the late 1970s and 1980s. Aletti was a senior editor at The Village Voice for nearly 20 years until leaving in early 2005.

Aletti worked with New York deejay Ritchie Rivera to curate a double-album disco compilation for Polydor Records, which released it in 1978 as Steppin' Out: Disco's Greatest Hits. Music critic Robert Christgau found it superior to Casablanca Records' Get Down and Boogie and Marlin's Disco Party, writing in Christgau's Record Guide: Rock Albums of the Seventies (1981): "Although local talent (Joe Simon, the Fatback Band) is represented, I find the spacey, lush-but-cool Euro-disco that predominates even more enticing, no doubt because the filler in which such music is usually swamped has been eliminated. New discoveries include the Chakachas' legendary 'Jungle Fever' and 'Running Away' by Roy Ayers, ordinarily the emptiest of 'jazz' pianists. This is disco the way it should be heard—as pure dance music, complete with risky changes."

In 1979 and 1980, Aletti also worked as the A&R Rep for Ray Caviano’s RFC Records.

=== Photography ===
Aletti is best known for his contributions to fine art photography. He reviewed photography exhibitions for The New Yorker until 2016.

Aletti has also curated numerous photography exhibitions, and has contributed writing for dozens of photography books. In 1998, Aletti was the curator of a highly praised exhibition of art and photography called Male, which was followed up in 1999 by Female, both at Wessel + O'Connor Gallery in New York. In conjunction with those shows, he was the co-editor the book "Male/Female: 105 photographs" published by Aperture in 1999, featuring his interview with Madonna, which was later anthologized in Da Capo's Best Music Writing (2000).

In 2000, he was the co-curator of an exhibition called Settings & Players: Theatrical Ambiguity in American Photography at London's White Cube. The following year Aletti organized Steven Klein American Beauty a retrospective exhibition of Steven Klein's fashion work for the Musée de l'Élysée in Lausanne, Switzerland.

Aletti was one of the two featured writers of The Book of 101 Books: Seminal Photographic Books of the Twentieth Century (2001).

In 2005, Aletti was the recipient of the Infinity Award for writing by The International Center for Photography.

== Exhibitions curated by Aletti ==
- 1998: Male. Wessel + O'Connor Gallery, New York.
- 1999: Male/Female. Wessel + O'Connor Gallery, New York.
- 2000: Settings & Players: Theatrical Ambiguity in American Photography. White Cube, London.
- 2001: Steven Klein American Beauty. Musée de l’Élysée, Lausanne, Switzerland.
- 2008: Male: work from the collection of Vince Aletti. White Columns, New York.
- 2010: Dress Codes The Third ICP Triennial of Photography and Video. International Centre of Photography, New York. Curated with Kristen Lubben, Christopher Phillips, and Carol Squiers.

== Bibliography ==
1990–1999

- Peter Hujar (1990). Essays by Stephen Koch and Thomas Sokolowski; interviews with Fran Lebowitz and Vince Aletti. New York: Grey Art Gallery and Study Center, New York University. (Note: Catalogue of an exhibition held at the Grey Art Gallery & Study Center, New York University, Jan. 17-Feb. 24, 1990, and the Fine Arts Gallery, University of British Columbia, Vancouver, B.C., Canada, Aug. 1-Sept. 15, 1990.)
- Vince Aletti; Wayne Koestenbaum; Michael L. Sand (1999). Male/female : 105 photographs. New York: Aperture Foundation.

2000–2009

- Settings and Players: Theatrical Ambiguity in American Photography. London: White Cube, 2001. ISBN 978-0952269052
- Four Days in LA: The Versace Collection. London: White Cube, 2001. ISBN 978-0952269076
- The Book of 101 Books: Seminal Photographic Books of the Twentieth Century. New York: PPP Editions, 2001. ISBN 978-0967077444
- Snapshots: The Eye Of the Century. Berlin: Hatje Cantz Publishers, 2004. ISBN 978-3775713962
- David Hilliard. New York: Aperture, 2005. ISBN 978-1931788588
- Aletti, Vince (June 6, 2005). "Big pictures". Goings on About Town. Critic's Notebook. The New Yorker. 81 (16): 18. Reviews the Gregory Crewdson photographs at the Luhring Augustine Gallery.
- Ingar Krauss: Portraits. Berlin: Hatje Cantz Publishers, 2006. ISBN 978-3775716789
- Mark Cohen:True Color. New York: powerHouse Books, 2007. ISBN 978-1576873724
- Face of Fashion. New York: Aperture, 2007. ISBN 978-1597110396
- Hedi Slimane: Rock Diary. Zurich: JRP|Ringier, 2008. ISBN 978-3905829600
- Bruce of Los Angeles: Inside/Outside. New York: Antinous Press, 2008. ISBN 978-1576874691
- Look at me: Photographs from Mexico City by Jed Fielding. Chicago: University Of Chicago Press, 2009. ISBN 978-0226248523
- Avedon Fashion 1944-2000. New York: Harry N. Abrams, 2009. ISBN 978-0810983892
- The Disco Files 1973-78: New York's Underground Week by Week. New York: DJhistory.com, 2009. ISBN 978-0956189608

2010–2019

- Male: From the Collection of Vince Aletti. New York: PPP Editions, 2010. ISBN 978-0971548060
- Aletti, Vince (June 7, 2010). "XX factor". Goings on About Town. Critic's Notebook. The New Yorker. 86 (16): 17. Reviews the 'Pictures by Women: A History of Modern Photography' exhibition at the Museum of Modern Art (MoMA).
- Michael Thompson: Portraits. Bologna: Damiani, 2011. ISBN 978-8862081566
- Aletti, Vince (April 4, 2011). "Flaming Creature". Goings on About Town. Critic's Notebook. The New Yorker. 87 (7): 17. Discusses Mark Morrisroe.
- — (December 19–26, 2011). "Major League". Goings on About Town. Critic's Notebook. The New Yorker. 87 (41): 12. Reviews the 'Radical Camera' exhibition at the Jewish Museum.
- Saul Leiter. Heidelberg: Kehrer Verlag, 2012. ISBN 978-3868282580
- New York at Night: Photography After Dark. New York: powerHouse Books, 2012. ISBN 978-1576876169
- Aletti, Vince (January 16, 2012). "Super Nanny". Goings on About Town. Critic's Notebook. The New Yorker. 87 (44): 6. Vivian Maier.
- — (November 26, 2012). "Reality Bites". Goings on About Town. Critic's Notebook. The New Yorker. 88 (37): 14. Reviews 'Faking It: Manipulated Photography Before Photoshop' at the Metropolitan Museum of Art.
- — (February 4, 2013). "Ongoing concern". Goings on About Town. Critic's Notebook. The New Yorker. 88 (46): 8. Retrospectives of Roman Vishniac and David Seymour at the International Center of Photography.
- — (April 1, 2013). "Shadow man". Goings on About Town. Critic's Notebook. The New Yorker. 89 (7): 10. Retrospective of Bill Brandt at the Museum of Modern Art (MoMA).
- — (April 29, 2013). "Battle seen". Goings on About Town. Critic's Notebook. The New Yorker. 89 (11): 10. Photography and the American Civil War at the Met.
- — (July 1, 2013). "Out of order". Goings on About Town. Critic's Notebook. The New Yorker. 89 (19): 10. A Different Kind of Order at the International Center of Photography.
- — (November 4, 2013). "Dispatches : photographers confront war, at the Brooklyn Museum". Goings on About Town. Art. The New Yorker. 89 (35): 27. War/Photography : Images of Armed Conflict and Its Aftermath.
- A Respect for Light: The Latin American Photographs: 1974-2008. New York: Glitterati, 2014. ISBN 978-0991341962
- Peter Hujar: Love & Lust. San Francisco: Fraenkel Gallery, 2014. ISBN 978-1881337379
- Mark Cohen: Dark Knees. Paris: Lebal, 2014. ISBN 978-2365110426
- Stephen Irwin. Berlin: r/e projects, 2015. ISBN 978-3000479977
- David Wojnarowicz: Brush Fires in the Social Landscape: Twentieth Anniversary Edition. New York: Aperture, 2015. ISBN 978-1597112949
- Aletti, Vince (July 20, 2015). "Optic nerve". Goings on About Town. Art. The New Yorker. 91 (20): 9. (Note: Online version is titled "'Sarah Charlesworth: Double World [sic]'".) Reviews the 'Sarah Charlesworth: Doubleworld' exhibition at the New Museum.
- Peter Hujar: Lost Downtown. New York: Pace MacGill Gallery, 2016. ISBN 978-3958291065
- Issues: A History of Photography in Fashion Magazines. London/New York: Phaidon Press, 2019. ISBN 978-0714876788

2020–

- Aletti, Vince (August 29, 2022). "[Untitled column]". Goings on About Town. In the Museums. The New Yorker. 98 (26): 5. Reviews the "William Klein: YES" retrospective at the International Center of Photography.
- — (April 3, 2023). "Tina Barney". Goings on About Town. Art. The New Yorker. 99 (7): 7. Reviews the exhibition of Barney's photographs at the Kasmin Gallery.
