= Disco: Soundtrack of a Revolution =

2024 British documentary series

- Genre: Documentary
- Starring: Nicky Siano; Larry Levan; David Depino; Earl Young; David Mancuso; Honey Dijon; Ana Matronic; Colleen 'Cosmo' Murphy
- Country of origin: United Kingdom
- Original language: English
- No. of episodes: 3

Original release
- Network: BBC, PBS
- Release: 2024 – 2024

Disco: Soundtrack of a Revolution is a 2024 BBC and PBS co-production and three-part documentary about the rise of disco music in the 1970s.

== Critical reception ==
Robert Lloyd of the Los Angeles Times wrote in his review, "Disco! The very word hustles you back to the 1970s", adding, "“I Will Survive," went the song, and if all this series does is get you to listen to Gloria Gaynor again or for the first time, it’ll have been worth it."

The Guardian said, "This wonderful series documents the passion and idealism of the 70s music scene. It's an immaculately soundtracked history lesson – and so much more besides."

The Financial Times wrote, "This BBC documentary series is partly a Day-Glo celebration of heady extravagance and irresistible grooves. But it's also an illuminating and sobering contemporary history that holds a mirror-ball up to 1970s America and its race, sex and gender politics."
