= Martin Circus =

French rock band

- Origin: France
- Genres: Rock, pop, disco, dance, pop rock, progressive rock, progressive pop, psychedelic rock, new wave, glam rock, chanson, synthpop
- Years active: 1968–1985; 2001; 2016
- Labels: ZE, Disques Vogue
- Past members: Bob Brault; Gérard Pisani; Patrick Dietsch; Paul-Jean Borowsky; Jean-Francois Leroi; Alain Pewsner; Gérard Blanc; Sylvain Pauchard; René Guérin; Tom Bock; Félix Sabal-Lecco
- Website: www.martincircus.com

Martin Circus was a French band formed in the late 1960s, whose musical style developed over time from progressive rock through pop to disco and new wave music in the 1970s and 1980s.

== Career ==
The band formed in 1968, at a time when the popular music scene in France was dominated by singers and bands performing versions of American and British songs, and established yé-yé and chanson-style singers. Martin Circus was one of the first French bands set up with the aim of writing and performing rock music with French language lyrics. Encouraged by English musician Mick Jones, who had played in Johnny Hallyday's backing group, the band was established by Gérard Pisani (b. 1941, saxophone) – who had also been in Hallyday's band – and Jean-Pierre "Bob" Brault (b. 1945, bass, vocals), soon joined by Patrick Dietsch (vocals, guitar), Paul-Jean Borowsky (vocals, keyboards), and Jean-Francois Leroi (drums). Their first single "Tout tremblant de fièvre", written by Dietsch and Pisani and released by Disques Vogue, was successful in 1969, and they recorded an LP, En Direct du Rock 'n Roll Circus.

By 1971, Dietsch, Borowsky and Leroi had left the band, to be replaced by Alain Pewsner (b. 1948, guitar), Gérard Blanc (1947–2009, vocals, guitar), Sylvain Pauchard (b. 1950, keyboards), and René Guérin (b. 1949, drums). Pewsner and Guérin had been members of the Alan Jack Civilization, and Blanc and Pauchard joined from the band Balthazar. They released a lavishly produced double album, Acte II, in 1971, featuring the hit single "Je m'éclate au Sénégal", written by Brault and Pisani. The band toured widely, performed at many festivals, and appeared in the 1971 movie Les Bidasses en folie. Pisani left the band in 1972, following which they appeared in the 1973 rock opera show La Révolution Française. They released the album Acte III in 1974.

By now, a four-piece pop group comprising Blanc, Pewsner, Pauchard and Guérin, Martin Circus released the album No. 1 USA Hits of the 60's, on which they recorded French language versions of American pop hits. They had their biggest hit single in 1975 with "Ma-ry-lène", a version of the Beach Boys' arrangement of "Barbara Ann". The albums Tu Joues Ton Cœur and Rock'n'Roll Circus followed in 1976, and the band continued to perform live.

In 1978, they appeared in, and provided the soundtrack for, the movie Les Bidasses en vadrouille, one of a long-running series of Bidasses comic movies. The soundtrack album was released as Martin 'Disco' Circus, and featured a 14-minute track, "Disco Circus", written by Blanc and Pewsner and arranged by Gilles Tinayre, who also played keyboards. Several versions of the track were issued internationally, including a version edited by François Kevorkian, and it has been widely sampled and appeared on several compilations of dance music. The album was issued in the US by Prelude Records as Disco Circus, with a revised track order.

Guérin left Martin Circus as their use of drum machines developed, and the remaining trio of Pewsner, Pauchard and Blanc released the album Shine Baby Shine in 1979. The band then shifted towards a new wave focus with the album De sang froid, which featured the return of original songwriter and saxophonist Gérard Pisani. However, it was not successful, and the band split up in the mid-1980s.

In 2001, an early line-up of Brault, Pisani, Borowsky, Dietsch, Blanc, and Guérin came together to record the album Origines, comprising a mixture of new and re-recorded material. Blanc died in 2009. Another reunion under the Martin Circus name, this time of Pewsner and Pauchard with singer Tom Bock and drummer Félix Sabal-Lecco, took place in 2016.

== Discography ==
- En Direct du Rock 'n Roll Circus (1969)
- Acte II (1971)
- Acte III (1974)
- No. 1 USA Hits of the 60's (1975)
- Tu Joues Ton Cœur (1976)
- Rock'n'Roll Circus (1976)
- Martin 'Disco' Circus (1978, a.k.a. Disco Circus)
- Shine Baby Shine (1979)
- De sang froid (1982)
- Origines (2001)
