= The Gallery (disco) =

Manhattan disco

Coordinates: 40.725453°N 73.99776°W

- Interactive map of The Gallery
- Address: Soho, Manhattan, New York City; United States
- Owner: Nicky Siano; Joe Siano
- Type: Disco

Construction
- Opened: February 1972
- Closed: October 1977

The Gallery was a disco in SoHo, Manhattan which was opened in February 1972 by disc jockey Nicky Siano and his older brother Joe Siano. The first location of The Gallery, located on 132 West 22nd Street, closed in July 1974. It reopened in November 1974 at 172 Mercer and Houston Streets and closed in October 1977. Famed DJs Larry Levan and Frankie Knuckles both worked at the club, but not at the DJ booth. Grace Jones and Loleatta Holloway both made their debut performances at The Gallery.

== Disco's House of Worship ==
The disco era produced an attitude and culture popular among a majority of the population, but proved to be an especially crucial time for the emergence and empowerment of traditionally marginalized and disadvantaged groups, as blacks, gays, and women found security in the community built around dance clubs such as The Gallery. This safety provided by The Gallery in the 1970s created a catharsis for minorities though the temporary relief from harsh outside realities. The club “[featured] ritualized activities centered around music, dance, and worship, in which there [were] no set boundaries between secular and sacred domains”.
