= The Loft (New York City) =

Nightclub in New York City

- Interactive map of The Loft
- Address: 647 Broadway; Manhattan, New York City; United States
- Coordinates: 40.7268034°N 73.9981011°W
- Owner: David Mancuso
- Type: Private club

Construction
- Opened: 1970

The Loft was the location for the first underground dance party (called "Love Saves the Day") organized by David Mancuso, on February 14, 1970, in New York City. Since then, the term "The Loft" has come to represent Mancuso's own version of a non-commercial party where no alcohol, food, nor beverages are sold. Mancuso's vision of a private party is similar to, and inspired by, the rent party and house party. Unlike conventional nightclubs or discotheques, attendance is by invitation only. In the late 1970s, Mancuso abandoned the generally accepted and expected practice of beatmatching, preferring to play songs in their entirety on his audiophile-quality sound system. The Village Voice wrote that Mancuso's sound system was the best in New York and even described him as "more of a party engineer than a DJ." Mancuso required that the music played had to be soulful, rhythmic, and impart words of hope, redemption, or pride.

== History ==
When Mancuso threw his first informal house parties from 1965-70, the gay community (who comprised much of The Loft's attendee roster) was often harassed in the gay bars and dance clubs, so many gay men carried bail money with them to gay bars. But at The Loft and many other early, private discotheques, they could dance together without fear of police action thanks to Mancuso's underground, yet legal, business model. Vince Aletti described it "like going to party, completely mixed, racially and sexually, where there wasn't any sense of someone being more important than anyone else". Alex Rosner, Mancuso's primary sound system engineer, reiterated this: "It was probably about sixty percent black and seventy percent gay...There was a mix of sexual orientation, there was a mix of races, mix of economic groups. A real mix, where the common denominator was music." Archie Burnett, club dancer and ambassador of urban dance social styles, expresses how the Loft was “not too white, not too black, not too straight, not too gay, you know—truly cool."

=== Location changes ===
==== 647 Broadway ====
The initial Loft was Mancuso's own home at 645-647 Broadway. The first "Love Saves the Day" party was held at the Broadway location and was attended by around 100 people. After the first event, parties were unofficially established on a weekly basis and ran from midnight until six in the morning. Admission was $2.00 to pay for rent and overhead, but attendees were never turned away for lack of funds. Organic dishes, breads, and freshly-squeezed fruit juice were freely available for attendees. Nothing was sold on the premises to keep the parties commerce-free operations.

Mancuso and Rosner experimented with the sound system to optimize the listeners' experience within the 1,850-square-foot space. The sound system consisted of a McIntosh amplifier, an AR amplifier, two Cornwall Klipschorn loudspeakers, and Vega bass bottom speakers. Eventually, Mancuso and Rosner installed an array of JBL tweeters above the dance floor to make it sound as though music moved outwards from the dance floor itself. Mancuso avoided using pitch control on the turntables and preferred playing records from start to finish without mixing. He also controlled the lighting and AC of the space to match the music.

The Loft experienced its first police raid in 1972 and Mancuso was initially arrested for operating an unlicensed cabaret. Mancuso successfully disputed the charges as there was no alcohol for sale and events were not open to the public. After the raid, Mancuso was more cautious about police presence and set up a warning system using lights. When the lights turned red, the party paused; everyone turned down the music, turned up the lights, and sat on the floor.

==== 99 Prince Street ====
The collapse of a neighboring hotel in 1974 forced a temporary closure and move to 99 Prince Street in Soho, in 1975. Vociferous community opposition ensued, and the party lay dormant for a year during the New York City Department of Consumer Affairs' longest administrative trial to date, based on their insistence that Mancuso required a "cabaret license". The department decreed in 1975 that he was free to host his parties as long as there were no sales of food or beverages. This decision set a new precedent that benefited the Paradise Garage and other private "clubs" in the process. The period also saw Mancuso's space serve as headquarters for the New York Record Pool, the very first record pool, which he founded with Vince Aletti and Steve D'Acquisto.

==== Alphabet City and Beyond ====
In 1984, after Mancuso's 99 Prince Street owner put the building up for sale, Mancuso purchased a building on 3rd Street, between Avenue B and Avenue C in Alphabet City. Not yet benefiting from gentrification, the new crime-and-drug ridden setting resulted in his losing "65 percent of [his] attendance". Around this time, DJ and promoter impresario Richard Vasquez began his influential and exclusive weekly parties, named "The Choice", at this location along with Joey Llanos. The party kept the spirit of the early Mancuso parties while embracing the early days of Deep House Music.

Subsequent Loft parties were scattered around the East Village. In 1994, Mancuso relocated to 81 Avenue A and subsequently downsized further to another location at 225 Avenue B. Loft parties were also held at 242 East 14th Street and the Marc Ballroom in Union Square. Mancuso continued to throw three to five Loft parties per year at rented locations in the East Village while organizing general admission Loft-style events in locales as disparate as London and Tokyo.

== Music ==
At the Loft, David Mancuso's eclectic musical palette introduced club-goers to an array of tracks that became iconic within the disco era. One notable example is Babe Ruth's "The Mexican," a rock-fusion piece that may not have fit the traditional disco mold but found a home at the Loft, eventually gaining recognition in the wider music scene, especially within the emerging hip-hop culture.

Mancuso's penchant for instrumentals and percussive tracks opened doors for songs like Olatunji's heavy Afro-funk compositions to permeate the Loft's dancefloor. The experimental nature of the Loft allowed for sonic experiments, where the combination of specific sound systems, such as Klipschorn speakers and JBL bullet tweeter arrays, created a unique and immersive auditory experience that could play for over twelve hours.

Mancuso's commitment to positive and meaningful lyrics, combined with soulful and rhythmic qualities, was evident in his song selections. Tracks like Fred Wesley's "House Party," with its festive and celebratory energy, translated the Loft's emphasis on joy and communal spirit. Mancuso's approach to telling a story through music, allowing songs to play in their entirety without mixing, set a precedent for DJs to focus on creating a narrative on the dancefloor.

The Loft's impact on popularizing certain records, like Barrabas' "Wild Safari" and "Woman," and its role in the exposure of Manu Dibango's "Soul Makossa," demonstrated Mancuso's ability to seek new music from foreign communities, influence trends and shape the musical landscape of the disco era.

== Legacy ==
Many of the disco era's leading disc jockeys, including Larry Levan, Nicky Siano, and Frankie Knuckles were early Loft attendees. Their venues (the Paradise Garage, The Gallery, Chicago's Warehouse, and the exclusively gay The Saint) were influenced by The Loft. Nonetheless, Mancuso maintained his niche, breaking such unconventional records as Manu Dibango's "Soul Makossa" and the Steve Miller Band's "Macho City" at his weekly events. The frequent selection of "Soul Makossa" at the Loft helped it reach the national Billboard chart two years after its release.

Mancuso continued to spread the influence of the Loft overseas, founding the Lucky Cloud Sound System in London and Last Note parties in Italy with his protégé Colleen Murphy, and provided inspiration to the audiophile club Precious Hall in Sapporo, Japan.

David Mancuso died on November 16, 2016 at the age of 72. Many mourned Mancuso's death, remembering him for his contributions to dance culture.

== Compilation albums ==
Two volumes of David Mancuso presents The Loft were released on the UK independent label Nuphonic Records in 1999 and 2000. These were compiled by Mancuso and Colleen ‘Cosmo’ Murphy and featured a selection of music played at The Loft parties.
