= Alex Rosner =

American sound engineer and designer

Alex Rosner is an American sound engineer and designer. He is known as the sound designer for the club The Loft and as the inventor of the DJ mixer.

== Early life ==
Rosner and his father survived the Holocaust and time at Dachau. After the war the family moved to Queens, New York. He received a degree in engineering from Rensselaer Polytechnic Institute.

== Career ==
Rosner got started building Hi-Fi systems while a student in electrical engineering. He built stereophonic discotheques at the 1964-65 World's Fair. This was the world's first stereophonic system.

Rosner opened his business, Rosner Custom Audio, in 1967. He had a long collaboration with David Mancuso. Rosner prototyped the first mixer in 1965, as a way to transition between vinyl records. He designed systems for Directoire, the Ginza, the Limelight, Max's Kansas City, Shepheard's, Tambuorine, and Tamburlaine. Rosner's systems survive at Riverside Cathedral and St. John the Divine churches in New York.
