= Mel Cheren =

Melvin Cheren (1933 – December 7, 2007) was an American record executive who helped start the Paradise Garage, also known as "Gay-rage", a New York City gay discothèque popular in the 1970s and '80s.

== Early life ==
Melvin "Mel" Cheren was born on January 21, 1933, in Everett, Massachusetts, and grew up in the Boston area.

His first job in the music business was in 1959 as salesman for ABC-Paramount Records.

In the 1960s, Cheren joined the Army and served in Germany. In 1964, he was in charge of production for ABC Records. In the 70's, he accepted a position for Scepter and began campaigning with the company to start producing dance music.

== West End Records ==
In 1976, Mel Cheren and Ed Kushins founded West End Records, the music label that defined the sound of New York City in the heyday of disco. Cheren created the 12-inch vinyl single, which permitted longer playing time than the standard seven-inch, and which gained its greatest popularity in discos.

== Paradise Garage ==
Cheren was business partner and former lover of Michael Brody, who created the Paradise Garage in 1977 with the financial back-up of Cheren. In the 2006 "The Godfather of Disco," a documentary about Cheren, he himself called the Garage "the ultimate expression of the whole fabric" of gay night life.

== Gay Men's Health Crisis ==
When Rodger McFarlane began a crisis counseling hotline about AIDS in 1982 as a program of the Gay Men's Health Crisis (GMHC) organization, he operated it out of a couple of rooms in a building in Chelsea owned by Mel Cheren. The building subsequently became the first headquarters and office of GMHC, rent-free. In 1984, when GMHC moved to larger quarters, Cheren turned the building into the Colonial House Inn, a 20-room gay-oriented guesthouse where he himself lived until his death.

== 24 Hours for Life ==
In the late 1980s, Cheren founded the nonprofit group "24 Hours for Life" to raise money for AIDS relief. Through the organization, he published his autobiography, My Life and the Paradise Garage: Keep On Dancin' (2000).

== Personal life ==
Mel Cheren died on December 7, 2007, from complications associated with AIDS.
