= Larry Levan =

American DJ from New York City (1954–1992)

- Levan performing at the Paradise Garage

Background information
- Born: Lawrence Philpot; July 20, 1954; Brooklyn, New York, U.S.
- Died: November 8, 1992 (aged 38) Beth Israel Medical Center; Manhattan, New York City, U.S.
- Genres: Garage house, club/dance, house, post-disco
- Occupations: DJ, music producer

Lawrence Philpot (July 20, 1954 – November 8, 1992), known as Larry Levan (/ləˈvæn/ lə-VAN), was an American DJ best known for his decade-long residency at the New York City night club Paradise Garage, which has been described as the prototype of the modern dance club. He developed a cult following who referred to his sets as "Saturday Mass". Influential post-disco DJ François Kevorkian credits Levan with introducing the dub aesthetic into dance music. Along with Kevorkian, Levan experimented with drum machines and synthesizers in his productions and live sets, ushering in an electronic, post-disco sound that presaged the ascendence of house music. He DJ'd at Club Zanzibar in the 1980s as well, home to the Jersey Sound brand of deep house or garage house.

== Early life ==
Levan was born at Brooklyn Jewish Hospital, New York, to Minnie (née Levan) and Lawrence Philpot. He had an older brother Isaac and sister Minnie who are biological twins. He was born with a congenital heart condition and suffered from asthma from a very young age which would make him prone to fainting in class. Although a fragile young boy, he excelled in math and physics, leaving an impression on his teachers that he would become an inventor one day. He inherited his love for music from his mother who loved blues, jazz, and gospel music, and he was able to use a record player from the age of three. As his mother reflects, "I'd make him put records on so that we could dance together." While attending Erasmus Hall High School in the late 1960s and early 1970s, as the neighborhood of Flatbush transitioned to a predominantly African-American population amid white flight, the flamboyantly vanguard Levan (who dyed his hair orange nearly a decade before the ascendance of punk rock), was frequently bullied by his classmates. Eventually, he dropped out of high school and found assuagement in Harlem's longstanding ball culture as a dressmaker, where he first became acquainted with fellow designer and lifelong best friend Frankie Knuckles.

He became infatuated with an idea of making the "music that would never stop" during a brief affair with hippie DJ David Mancuso, who introduced Levan to Manhattan's burgeoning underground downtown dance culture. Mancuso was the proprietor of The Loft, a minimally decorated, members-only dance club (uniquely situated in his home) where "punch, fruit and candy" were served in lieu of alcohol and music was processed by a state-of-the-art sound system. According to the pseudonymous "Apollo," an acquaintance of Levan and Knuckles, "You could only get into the Loft by private invitation. This was not because Mancuso wanted to create an elitist environment; he intentionally wanted to bring together diverse groups of gays who wouldn't ordinarily party together to create a democratic, integrated venue. David was powerfully attracted to black music and culture as well as men, so this Loft party was instrumental in bringing together wealthy, white gay men, many of them music executives, with this black musical dance culture he adored."

== Musical career ==
Levan got his start alongside Frankie Knuckles at the Continental Baths, as a replacement for the DJ from The Gallery, Nicky Siano, who briefly employed both men as decorators at The Gallery and taught them his pioneering three turntable technique. Accordingly, Levan's DJing style was influenced by Siano's penchant for Philadelphia soul and upbeat rock and Mancuso's jazz-inflected eclecticism; as with Mancuso, he briefly dated Siano during the epoch. While Knuckles was still trying to make his way in the New York club scene, Levan soon became a popular attraction at venues such as SoHo Place due to his "diva persona," which he had previously developed in the city's notoriously competitive black drag "houses".

At the height of the disco boom in 1977, Levan was offered a residency at the Paradise Garage. Although owner Michael Brody—who employed Levan at the defunct Reade Street in 1976, where he "developed the techniques as well as the sound – the deep, dark bass, the queasy, dubby emotion that he would extract from records – that would make him a legend"—intended to create a downtown facsimile of Studio 54 catering to an upscale white gay clientele, the new venue initially drew an improbable mix of streetwise Blacks, Latinos, and punks after a disastrous opening night alienated the target demographic; according to West End Records founder Mel Cheren, Brody's former companion and a silent partner in the venture, "The sound equipment got stuck in a blizzard at an airport in Louisville, Kentucky. And people were kept outside in 17-degree weather. Some of them never came back... the club didn't really take on the atmosphere that people remember it for until 1980."

Open only to a select membership and housed in an otherwise unadorned building on King Street in Greenwich Village, the club and Levan's DJing slowly entered the mainstream. Influential WBLS DJ/programming director Frankie Crocker often mentioned the club on air and based his playlists around Levan's sets. The Richard Long & Associates Sound system (RLA) of the club included custom-designed "McLaughlin" bass speakers.

Filling the void left by leading DJ/remixer Walter Gibbons following his conversion to evangelical Christianity, Levan became a prolific producer and mixer in the 1980s, with many of his efforts crossing over onto the national dance music charts. Among the records that received Levan's touch were his remixes of "Ain't No Mountain High Enough" by Inner Life, "Ain't Nothin' Goin On But The Rent" by Gwen Guthrie and "Heartbeat" by Taana Gardner, as well as his production work on the long-awaited "Don't Make Me Wait" by the Peech Boys, a group that Levan formed and was part of (and who became the New York Citi Peech Boys when the Beach Boys threatened a lawsuit due to the similar sound of the name). With a strong gospel tinge in the vocal arrangements and driven by a tinkling piano, the latter song is a quintessential example of his soulful aesthetic. One of the first dance releases to incorporate influences from dub music and an appended vocal-only edit, Levan tinkered with the song for nearly a year despite the looming bankruptcy of West End Records. When it was finally released, much of the song's word-of-mouth momentum had been lost, leading it to stall in the lower reaches of the charts.

As the popularity of the Garage soared in the mid-1980s just as many patrons and friends succumbed to AIDS, Levan became increasingly dependent upon PCP and heroin. While performing, he began to ensconce himself within a protective entourage of drag queens and younger acolytes. At the Paradise Garage, Levan was described as being "worshipped, almost like a god." As beat-matching and ideological stylistic adherence became the norm among club DJs, Levan's idiosyncratic sets (running the gamut from Evelyn "Champagne" King, Chaka Khan and Deodato with Camille to Kraftwerk, Manuel Göttsching, and British synthpop) elicited criticism from some quarters. Nevertheless, he remained at the forefront of dance music; recordings of Levan's final sets at the Garage demonstrate his affinity for the insurgent sounds of Chicago house and hip-hop.

The Garage ended its run with a 48-hour-long party in September 1987, weeks before Brody died from AIDS-related complications. The club's closure and Brody's death devastated Levan, who knew that few club owners would tolerate his quirks and drug dependencies. Although Brody had verbally bequeathed the club's sound and lighting systems to Levan, they were instead left to Brody's mother in his will. This change was reportedly instigated by the late impresario's lover and manager, who reportedly despised Levan.

Despite protestations and pleas to the Brody family from Mel Cheren, the systems remained in storage as their property. Unable to secure a long-term residency after a stay at the short-lived Choice in the East Village alongside DJ/proprietor Richard Vasquez and Joey Llanos, Levan began to sell his valuable records for drug money. Friends like Danny Krivit would buy them back for him out of sympathy.

As the 1990s dawned, Levan was on the brink of a comeback. Dismissed as a relic in New York despite managing occasional appearances at the au courant Sound Factory, his popularity had nonetheless soared among connoisseurs of disco and early American electronic dance music in Europe and Japan. In 1991, he was brought over to London for a weekend by Justin Berkmann to DJ at the Ministry of Sound nightclub. To the mutual surprise of both parties, he ended up staying for three months; during this period, he remixed and produced tracks for the club's record label and helped to tune the venue's acclaimed sound system.

Although he was still dependent on heroin, Levan's 1992 tour of Japan garnered gushing accolades in the local press. Encouraged by Cheren, he entered rehab and continued his tentative recording forays. François Kevorkian described Levan's final Japanese sets as nostalgic and inspirational, imbued with an air of bittersweetness and closure.

== Later months and death ==
Levan informed his mother in June 1992 that he had "lived a good life" and was "ready to die". Having been mildly injured on the Japanese tour, he was voluntarily hospitalized at Beth Israel Medical Center following his return to New York. Three days after being released into the care of his mother, he was re-hospitalized at Beth Israel with hemorrhage symptoms. He died, aged 38, of heart failure caused by endocarditis at 6:15 p.m. EST, on Sunday, November 8, 1992.

== Personal life ==
Levan was openly gay. He was previously romantically involved with Nicky Siano (a fellow Brooklynite and Mancuso disciple who had been in a relationship with Mel Cheren). Frankie Knuckles and Levan were lifetime friends who were introduced to each other by a "drag queen called Gerald" when Levan was 15 years old; Levan and Knuckles were both active in the local drag scene.

== Legacy ==
In September 2004, Levan was inducted into the Dance Music Hall of Fame for his outstanding achievement as a DJ.

Levan's significance to the history of disco music is discussed in Episode 3 of the 2024 PBS series Disco: Soundtrack of a Revolution.

== Tributes ==
- Anything Goes! (1994), the second album by dance group C+C Music Factory, contains a tribute to Levan titled "A Moment of Silence for Larry Levan." (It also contains a track "A Moment of Silence for Chep Nunez"; Nunez was an American music producer, editor, and mixer who reached chart success with the group 2 Puerto Ricans, a Blackman, and a Dominican.)
- The album The Rose Has Teeth in the Mouth of a Beast (2006), by the electronic music duo Matmos, contains a tribute to Levan titled "Steam and Sequins for Larry Levan".
- The 2003 documentary Maestro, directed by Josell Ramos, tells the story of the underground dance music movement and the importance of Larry Levan as one of its key figures.
- In 2019, Corrado Rizza directed and produced a documentary movie titled Larry's Garage about Larry Levan.
- The LCD Soundsystem song "Losing My Edge" (2002) mentions both Levan and the Paradise Garage.

== See also ==
- LGBT culture in New York City
- List of LGBT people from New York City

== Bibliography ==
- Brewster, Bill; Broughton, Frank (1999). Last Night a DJ Saved my Life: the History of the Disc Jockey. Headline Book Publishing Ltd. ISBN 0-7472-6230-6.
- Lawrence, Tim (2004). Love Saves the Day: A History of American Dance Music Culture, 1970-1979. Duke University Press. ISBN 0-8223-3198-5.
