= David Mancuso =

American disc jockey (1944–2016)

- Born: David Paul Mancuso; October 20, 1944; Utica, New York, U.S.
- Died: November 14, 2016 (aged 72); New York City, U.S.
- Occupation: Disc jockey
- Known for: The Loft

David Paul Mancuso (October 20, 1944 – November 14, 2016) was an American disc jockey, notable for organising invitation-only parties in 1960s New York City, which led to him founding The Loft nightclub.

The first such party, called "Love Saves The Day", was held on 14 February, 1970. Mancuso pioneered the private party, as distinct from the more commercial nightclub business model. In the early 1970s, Mancuso won a long administrative trial when the New York City Department of Consumer Affairs found that he was not selling food or beverages to the public and therefore did not need a New York City cabaret license.

Many famous private discothèques of the 1970s and 1980s were modeled after The Loft, including the Paradise Garage, The Gallery, 12 West, The Flamingo and later The Saint. Mancuso also helped start the record pool system for facilitating the distribution of promotional records to the qualified disc jockey.

== Biography ==
=== Early life ===
Mancuso was born on October 20, 1944, in Utica, New York. He was born out of wedlock while his mother's husband was serving in World War II and lived in an orphanage for the first five years of his life. Although he nominally resided with his mother thereafter, he remained a frequent runaway and spent a year in reform school as a teenager; during this period, he cultivated an interest in early rhythm and blues music.

He dropped out of high school on his 16th birthday and worked as a dishwasher for two years to finance his move to New York City in 1962. Over the next several years, he was employed in a variety of capacities (including stints as head of Holt Rinehart Winston's Xerox department and as a personnel manager for Restaurant Associates) before pursuing a career as an independent antiques dealer.

=== Career ===
Mancuso developed a broad network of associates, frequenting rent parties in Harlem and Staten Islandwhile also immersing himself in the hippie culture of the era at such East Village venues as the Electric Circus, the Planetarium, and the Fillmore East. He became an ardent devotee of Timothy Leary's The Psychedelic Experience (1966) after his initial experiments with LSD.

Before hosting the first Loft party at his home at 647 Broadway in 1970, Mancuso was playing records for his friends on a semi-regular basis. By 1971, the Loft parties became so popular that he and doorman Steve Abramowitz decided to make them a weekly affair.

The scene around Mancuso and The Loft has gone on to be documented in Josell Ramos' documentary, Maestro (2003), a Paradise Garage and Levan-centered narrative of New York dance music culture in the 1970s and 1980s.

In 1999 and 2000, Mancuso and Colleen 'Cosmo' Murphy produced the compilation series David Mancuso Presents The Loft, Volumes One and Two on Nuphonic.

In 2003, British journalist and lecturer Tim Lawrence published an influential and comprehensive study of the New York roots of modern dance music culture that placed Mancuso at its narrative center. Entitled Love Saves the Day: A History of American Dance Music Culture, 1970–1979, the book highlights the influence of Mancuso's late 1960s and early 1970s Loft parties the New York dance music scene.

On September 19, 2005, Mancuso was inducted into the Dance Music Hall of Fame for his outstanding achievement as a DJ.

On December 23, 2006, a nightclub named after Mancuso opened in Tübingen, in southern Germany; the club's name has since changed to Schlachthaus.

In May 2008, Mancuso, with the help of Goshi Manabe, Colleen ‘Cosmo’ Murphy, and Satoru Ogawa, launched his own audiophile record label, The Loft Audiophile Library of Music. The music is mastered by Stan Ricker.

Mancuso is featured in the 2024 BBC documentary series Disco: Soundtrack of a Revolution.

=== Death ===
Mancuso died at his home in Manhattan on November 14, 2016.
