= Eric Matthew =

- Born: Joseph William Tucci; 1953
- Origin: Queens, New York
- Genres: Rock, disco, R&B
- Occupations: Producer, songwriter, engineer
- Instrument: Guitar, piano, vocals
- Labels: Radar Records, Columbia Records

Joseph William Tucci (born 1953), known under his alias Eric Matthew, is an American record label owner, record producer, engineer, songwriter and guitarist, previously involved in the New York post-disco scene of the early 1980s.

== Biography ==
Tucci originally performed at weddings, bar mitzvahs and parties in the New York metropolitan area with his friends. Then, after producing a demo with fellow band member Gary R. Turnier, he landed a record deal with indie label SAM Records, owned by Sam Weiss, which by then had major label Columbia as their distribution company. Essentially a minimal rock combo with musical influences ranging from deep funk, pop, jazz to disco, the band, named Gary's Gang by Turnier and Tucci, consisted of a saxophonist, a trombonist, a flautist, a percussionist, and keyboardists. The second album, Keep on Dancing, performed well on the music charts, peaking at #27 on the Billboard R&B Albums and #42 on the Billboard 200. This accomplishment led Tucci to establish his own record label and produce other artists. His productions included "Reach Up" by Toney Lee (on his own label) and the album Redd Hott by Sharon Redd (for Prelude Records). With Gary Turnier he produced records like Tracy Weber's "Sure Shot," Sinnamon's "Thanks to You," and Dr. Jekyll & Mr. Hyde's "Genius Rap" in his garage.

Tucci is married and has three daughters. His musical influences include 1960s pop and the "zaniness of the later Beatles albums."

== Production and writing discography ==
Year	Work	Label	Add.	Role	Peak chart positions	
Year	Work	Label	Add.	Role	US R&B	US DAN
Gary's Gang
1978	"Keep On Dancin’"	Columbia Records/Sony		artist, co-writer, co-producer	11	1
Sharon Redd
1982	"Beat the Street"	Prelude	with Darryl Payne	co-writer, co-producer	41	—
1983	"Takin' a Chance on Love"	Prelude	with Gene Redd, S. Redd, Ruth Carson	co-writer, producer	—	—
1983	"You're the One"	Prelude	with Daryl Payne	co-writer, producer	—	—
1983	"Love How You Feel"	Prelude	alone	writer, producer	—	16
1984	"You're a Winner"	Prelude	with S. Redd, Scott Nesbitt	co-writer, producer	—	—
Elektric Funk
1982	"On a Journey (I Sing the Funk Electric)"	Prelude	with Darryl Payne, Miles Watson	co-writer, co-producer	—	33
Toney Lee
1982	"Reach Up"	Radar	with Toney Lee	co-writer, producer	—	8
France Joli
1982	"Your Good Lovin'"	Prelude	with Darryl Payne	co-writer, co-producer	—	53
Sinnamon
1982	"Thanks to You"	Becket	with Darryl Payne, Keith Diamond	co-writer, co-producer	44	1
Disco 4
1983	"We're at the Party"	Profile	with Disco 4	co-writer, producer	84	—
Rockell
1998	"In a Dream"	Robbins Entertainment		co-producer	—	13
Phats & Small
1998	"Turn Around"	Multiply Records	with Toney Lee	co-writer	—	1
Soulsearcher
1998	"Can't Get Enough"	Defected Records		co-writer	—	20
