= Toney Lee =

American singer, songwriter and producer (1953–2026)

- Born: James Anthony Lee; September 12, 1953
- Origin: New York City, U.S.
- Died: June 17, 2026 (aged 72)
- Genres: Garage house, post-disco, club/dance
- Occupations: Record producer, singer, songwriter
- Years active: 1982–2026
- Labels: Radar, Unidisc

James Anthony Lee (September 12, 1953 – June 17, 2026), better known as Toney Lee, was an American singer, songwriter, and record producer, best known for his club hit "Reach Up", famously sampled by Phats & Small for their 1999 hit "Turn Around". It reached the No. 8 position on the US Billboard Dance chart.

== Career ==
Toney Lee's first and best known hit, "Reach Up", reached No. 8 on the US Billboard Dance chart. "Reach Up" also charted at No. 64 on the UK Singles Chart in January 1983. Later in 1983, Lee recorded his second single "Love So Deep" for Radar Records. While not as successful as his first single, it had a relatively strong performance on the dance charts as well, reaching No. 22 on the US Billboard Dance chart. Both tracks were produced and written by Eric Matthew (best known for his work for musicians like Gary's Gang, Sharon Redd and Sinnamon) and Lee.

In 1985, his song "Teaser" reached No. 64 on the US Billboard R&B chart. A further release, "My Baby Loves Me" charted at No. 41 on the US Dance chart in October 1987.

== Death ==
Lee died on June 17, 2026, at the age of 72.

== Discography ==
=== Albums ===
- Teaser (Critique, 1986)

=== Singles ===
| Year | Single | Label | Chart positions | | |
| Year | Single | Label | US Dance | US R&B | UK |
|---|---|---|---|---|---|
| 1982 | "Reach Up" | Radar | 8 | ― | 64 |
| 1982 | "Love So Deep" | Radar | 22 | ― | ― |
| 1985 | "Teaser" | Critique | ― | 64 | ― |
| 1985 | "Night Lights" | Critique | ― | ― | ― |
| 1986 | "Goin' Through the Motions of Love" | Critique | — | ― | ― |
| 1987 | "My Baby Loves Me" | Jump Street | 41 | ― | ― |
| 1988 | "Sensual Surrender" | Jump Street | ― | ― | ― |
| 1992 | "No Matter" | Emotive Records | ― | ― | ― |
"—" denotes the single failed to chart

"Reach Up"

| 12" single | 1. "Reach Up" – 6:54; 2. "Reach Up" (Dub) – 5:54; Label: Radar; Mixed-by: Eric Matthew, Nick Chiusano; Producer: Eric Matthew |
