= Komiko =

1982 American electronic music group

- Origin: New York, New York, U.S.
- Genres: Post-disco • garage house
- Years active: 1982
- Labels: SAM Records

Komiko was a short-lived electronic music studio group signed to SAM Records, an independent label in New York City. According to Allmusic, Carol Williams was once a member of this group but the vocals are attributed to unnamed female personnel, most likely a guest vocalist. Their so-far only song "Feel Alright," written by Nick Braddy, was a collaboration between record producers Darryl Payne and Gary Turnier. Record sleeve note ascribes production credit to Totally Funked Up Productions, Inc. which is a company based in Delaware.

== History ==
A number of personnel in this group were behind other short-lived groups of the same genre including Vicky D, Sinnamon and Kreamcicle. Both Vicky D and Komiko had Gary R. Turnier as their producer while Payne produced Sinnamon's material. Before Komiko, Williams recorded a song "No One Can Do It (Like You)" for Vanguard Records featuring both credits of Payne and Turnier as its respective producers. Braddy, a native to Jamaica, Queens, whose musical influences include War, Funkadelic, Chicago, and Hendrix, with his writing partner Richard Bassoff are known for penning "Sure Shot," "One Step At A Time" and "Let's Call It a Day," et al. Chaka Khan and Evelyn "Champagne" King backup singer Tracy Weber, who provided vocals for "Sure Shot," was however shot in an armed robbery incident in the same year of its planned release leaving Weber's family with a decision, who, however, allowed it to be published.

Being a one-hit wonder group, their song simultaneously entered the Billboard Hot Soul Singles (now Hot R&B/Hip-Hop Songs) and Dance/Disco Top 80 (now Hot Dance Club Songs) music charts. On the latter for over 8 weeks, while the highest position was #32 and #83 on the former.

== Discography ==
=== Singles ===
"Feel Alright"

12" single	1. "Feel Alright" – 5:55; 2. "Feel Alright" (instrumental) – 7:30; Label: SAM; Written-by: Nick Braddy; Producer: Gary R. Turnier, Darryl Payne

=== Compilation appearances ===
- "Feel Alright" on SAM Dance Classics CD (1990, Sam Records)
- "Feel Alright" on Nervous Does Disco Volume 1 CD (1991, Nervous Records)
- "Feel Alright" on Nighttime Lovers Volume 6 CD (2007, PTG Records / Vinyl Masterpiece)
- "Feel Alright" on Boogie's Gonna Getcha: '80s New York Boogie CD (2009, Harmless)
