= 54 (film) =

1998 film by Mark Christopher

- Theatrical release poster
- Directed by: Mark Christopher
- Written by: Mark Christopher
- Produced by: Richard N. Gladstein; Dolly Hall; Ira Deutchman
- Starring: Ryan Phillippe; Salma Hayek; Neve Campbell; Mike Myers; Sela Ward; Breckin Meyer; Sherry Stringfield
- Cinematography: Alexander Gruszynski
- Edited by: Lee Percy
- Music by: Marco Beltrami
- Production companies: Redeemable Features; Dollface; FilmColony
- Distributed by: Miramax Films
- Release date: August 28, 1998 (United States)
- Running time: 93 minutes (theatrical cut); 100 minutes (extended cut); 105 minutes (director's cut)
- Country: United States
- Language: English
- Budget: $13 million
- Box office: $16.8 million

54 is a 1998 American drama film written and directed by Mark Christopher. Starring Ryan Phillippe, Salma Hayek, Neve Campbell and Mike Myers, the film focuses on the rise and fall of Studio 54, a famous nightclub in New York City during the late 1970s and early 1980s.

Prior to its release in the United States on August 28, 1998, by Miramax Films, the film was extensively reshot and recut; it ultimately opened to poor critical reaction and box office. In 2008, a bootleg version of the director's cut was screened at Outfest, leading to interest for its release. In 2015, Christopher and Miramax premiered a new edit of the film at the 65th Berlin International Film Festival, with 45 minutes of original material restored and 30 minutes of studio re-shoots removed.

== Plot ==
=== Theatrical version ===
In the summer of 1979, 19-year-old Irish-American gas station attendant Shane O'Shea lives in Jersey City, New Jersey, with his widowed, conservative father Harlan and two younger sisters Grace and Kelly. Weary of his working-class existence, Shane longs for a more glamorous life across the river in New York City's Manhattan. One night, he persuades his two friends Key and Ricko into accompanying him to Studio 54, a disco nightclub. When he is chosen to enter upon arrival by the club's co-owner Steve Rubell, he is exposed to the hedonistic world of 54, with unbridled alcohol, drugs, and open sex. Against Harlan's wishes, Shane returns to 54 the next night and Steve hires him as a busboy. After fighting with Harlan over his new job, he leaves Jersey City and moves in with fellow busboy Greg Randazzo and his coat-check girl wife Anita, an aspiring singer, in Manhattan.

After a week bussing tables, Shane is promoted to bartender following a one-night stand with club regular Billie Auster, upsetting Greg, who feels that he did not get the job because he would not let Steve perform oral sex on him. As Shane's popularity skyrockets, he mingles with the city's upper-class, poses for a beefcake photo shoot in Interview magazine, consumes drugs and has sex with multiple women. After a while, Shane begins to feel used because he wants to be taken seriously and valued for more than just his good looks and sex appeal.

Shane's rise in popularity also damages his relationships with his friends and family, especially during the Christmas holidays. On Christmas Eve, Greg, who now moonlights as a drug dealer for extra money, criticizes Shane of displaying a conceited attitude and accuses him of attempting to have sex with Anita after witnessing him attempting to begin a romantic relationship with her earlier at their apartment. Harlan, whom Shane has not seen or spoken to in months, rejects him when he returns home for a visit on Christmas Day because a female friend of the family who got into 54 one night informed him that she saw Shane doing drugs. However, he does experience some brief happiness during the holidays when he commences a short-lived romance with fellow New Jerseyan Julie Black, a soap opera starlet determined to succeed in the film industry.

On New Year's Eve, 1979, Shane's stardom, his relationship with Julie and 54's life all end. He disgustedly rejects Julie after discovering her with Roland Sachs, an agent she plans to have sex with to advance her career. After elderly 54 regular Mona (aka Disco Dottie) dies of a cocaine overdose during Anita's debut performance, Steve asks a grief-stricken Shane to ignore the incident and continue working. Shane angrily refuses and gets into a near-physical altercation with Steve, who then fires him and orders his bouncers to expel him from the club. Simultaneously, the FBI raids 54 and arrests Steve, as he has been skimming money from the club's nightly take. As Shane leaves 54 in disgrace, Julie passes by him in a limousine and following a heart-to-heart, they part ways but agree to remain friends.

Ultimately, Steve receives an 18-month prison sentence for tax evasion, and 54 closes; upon release, he is forced to sell 54 but remains associated with the club as a consultant under the new management. Meanwhile, Shane communicates regularly with Julie, who moves to Hollywood and lands a bit part in a film but he, Anita and Greg drift apart. Anita releases a moderately successful album with Casablanca Records and Greg obtains a construction job after serving six months of probation for dealing drugs. Shane works nights managing a restaurant in Greenwich Village and takes business classes at NYU during the daylight hours; he also improves his relationships with Harlan, Grace and Kelly by visiting them weekly. Shane, Greg and Anita reunite at the newly reopened 54 upon Steve's release for a one-night welcome-back party hosted by him for all of his old friends and employees. Eventually, 54 closes permanently in 1986 and Steve dies of AIDS in 1989 at age 45.

=== Director's cut additions ===
The director's cut opens with a new narration of the film's original opening as Shane is seen leaving 54 after being thrown out on New Year's Eve. Shane's narration from the theatrical version is omitted.

In a moment of confusion, an openly bisexual Shane kisses Greg in the VIP room on Christmas Eve, before then having sexual intercourse with Anita in the ladies' room after she and Greg have an altercation. Anita, noticing Steve watching them, hits Shane in the stomach and runs out of the ladies' room in shame.

When Shane discovers that he is running low on cash due to his numerous debts, Greg introduces him to his covert drug-dealing operation. Shane steals some of Steve's skimmed cash as capital and repays his debts on New Year's Eve.

Greg eventually agrees to let Steve perform oral sex on him for the bartender job but Steve disagrees, admitting that he would rather watch Greg and Anita have sex instead, as he did on Christmas Eve. Greg goes to the cloakroom to confront Anita and encounters her hugging Shane, after which the two have a fistfight. Shane freebases cocaine to ease his emotional pain.

After Greg and Anita reconcile following her interrupted debut performance, Anita leaves with Billie for a photo op. Shane discovers G-men raiding Steve's office and retreats upstairs to warn Greg but Greg ignores him. Greg then runs to retrieve his belongings from his locker when he sees Shane being thrown out of the club but discovers that a G-man has already beat him to it and has found his drugs.

After Shane is expelled from 54, he witnesses Greg running up behind him. Shane offers him his garbage bag cloak to keep him clothed and Greg begrudgingly accepts. Anita runs up to them afterwards in a lavish fur coat and cloaks Greg in it with her as they both depart. Greg calls for Shane to accompany them, just as Julie pulls up Shane alongside in her limousine and offers him a ride. Shane declines Julie's offer and instead departs with Greg and Anita, with the trio staying together as a family instead of drifting apart.

== Cast ==
- Ryan Phillippe as Shane O'Shea
- Salma Hayek as Anita Randazzo
- Neve Campbell as Julie Black
- Mike Myers as Steve Rubell
- Sela Ward as Billie Auster
- Breckin Meyer as Greg Randazzo
- Sherry Stringfield as Viv
- Ellen Albertini Dow as Disco Dottie (Mona)
- Cameron Mathison as Atlanta
- Noam Jenkins as Romeo
- Jay Goede as Buck
- Heather Matarazzo as Grace O'Shea
- Skipp Sudduth as Harlan O'Shea
- Daniel Lapaine as Marc, the doorman
- Erika Alexander as Ciel
- Domenick Lombardozzi as Key
- Mark Ruffalo as Ricko
- Robert Bauer as Roland Sachs
- Kohl Sudduth as Rhett
- Lorri Bagley as Patti
- Lauren Hutton as Liz Vangelder
- Louis Negin as Truman Capote
- Barbara Radecki as a TV host
- Ron Jeremy as Ron
- Sean Sullivan as Andy Warhol
- Bruce MacVittie as a music producer
- Michael York as an ambassador

== Production ==
Based on two short films Mark Christopher made, Miramax Films persuaded Christopher to direct the full-length feature about Studio 54. He had spent five years researching the club and the time period while working on a screenplay. Miramax Films purchased a partial screenplay in 1995 and developed the script with the filmmaker for over a year.

Christopher shot the film in Toronto over two months in the fall of 1997. However, he and studio head Harvey Weinstein differed on their respective visions of the film. Christopher intended for the film to capture Studio 54's notoriety as "the epicenter of the gay cultural explosion in New York City" and wanted the story to be told from the perspective of "Shane, a kid from New Jersey who sleeps his way to the top of the 54 pecking order, which means that he becomes one of the shirtless bartenders for which the club was notorious, golden boys who flexed and preened for the clientele of both sexes, occasionally deigning to grant sexual favors in return for money and drugs". Conversely, Weinstein wanted a more commercial film akin to Saturday Night Fever (1977), with its gay storyline removed.

Weinstein screen tested Christopher's cut of the film on Long Island in early 1998. Audiences at this screening reacted negatively to the lead character's Shane O'Shea (Ryan Philippe)'s bisexuality, particularly to a scene where Shane and Greg Randazzo (Breckin Meyer) kiss, as well as the happy ending for both characters and Anita (Salma Hayek). Miramax Films subsequently requested the film remove any suggestions of bisexuality. The postproduction process was troubled, with Weinstein hiring a second writing team to flesh out new scenes that play up a romance between Shane and Julie Black (Neve Campbell). Christopher was not allowed in the editing room and though he agreed to shoot the new scenes after initial resistance, he did not get to see the final cut.

== Reception and legacy ==
54 opened at No. 4 on its opening weekend (August 28–30, 1998) with $6.6 million, behind Blade, There's Something About Mary and Saving Private Ryan.

=== Studio cut ===
The film grossed $16.8 million on an estimated budget of $13 million. Mike Myers, in his first serious dramatic role, garnered some of the film's only positive word-of-mouth. The role was his first foray into drama, followed by 2009's Inglourious Basterds, 2018's Bohemian Rhapsody and Terminal, and 2026's Michael.

Though some critics noted Christopher manages to "[re-create] the club's playfully subversive physical details: the glitter confetti and giant silver man-in-the-moon cokehead mobile, the VIP room hidden in the dank basement", many were particularly disappointed with the film's fictional characters and storyline, believing that Studio 54's notorious, real-life past should have been explored with better detail and more realism.

On the review aggregator website Rotten Tomatoes, the film holds an approval rating of 15% based on 66 reviews, with an average rating of 4.2/10. The website's critics consensus reads, "Robbed of its integral LGBTQ themes, 54 is a compromised and disjointed glance at the glory days of disco." Metacritic, which uses a weighted average, assigned the film a score of 33 out of 100, based on 20 critics, indicating "generally unfavorable" reviews. Audiences polled by CinemaScore gave the film an average grade of "C" on an A+ to F scale.

The film was nominated for two Golden Raspberry Awards, including Worst Actor for Ryan Phillippe and Worst Supporting Actress for Ellen Albertini Dowat the 19th Golden Raspberry Awards. Neve Campbell was nominated for Worst Supporting Actress (also for Wild Things) at the 1998 Stinkers Bad Movie Awards. Despite the aforementioned mocking prizes, a few of the film's cast members had performances which yielded some prestigious recognition for their onscreen work: Mike Myers' turn earned him a nomination for a Csapnivaló Award; Salma Hayek's performance was nominated for an ALMA Award; and Heather Matarazzo was nominated for a YoungStar Award.

=== Director's cut ===
In the years after the theatrical cut's release, a bootleg VHS version of the two-hour-long rough cut began circulating. Strong word of mouth and support led to New York LGBTQ film festival Outfest screening the rough cut to a sold-out crowd in 2008. Christopher and his co-producer Jonathan King had been lobbying Miramax for years to allow them to remaster the director's cut for DVD. In 2014, the filmmakers received the greenlight to make 54: The Director's Cut from Zanne Devine, Miramax's then-VP of production. They completed the film in time for a screening in the Panorama section of the 65th Berlin International Film Festival in February 2015. The 105 minute-long cut included 44 minutes of restored footage, with all but a few seconds of the studio-dictated re-shot footage jettisoned.

The director's cut has received a much more positive critical response, and the film has a cult following among the gay community. Of 54: The Director's Cut, critic Louis Jordan wrote, "Driven by character and atmosphere rather than soapy plot, Christopher's film is permeated by a melancholy that adds depth to the ecstatic party scenes. Mike Myers nails the pathos and charm behind Rubell's luded-out lechery, while Phillippe's measured performance, finally given space to breathe, is vulnerable, amoral, and sexy. There are no easy heroes or villains in this 54, only people looking for something they'll likely never find."

== Soundtrack ==
The soundtrack for 54 was released in two volumes with 16 songs on each album. In some countries, like Europe, both volumes were combined into a 2 disc double album.

54: Music from the Miramax Motion Picture, Volume 1

Soundtrack album by Various
- Released: August 4, 1998
- Recorded: 1975–1998
- Genre: Disco
- Length: 1:12:12
- Label: Tommy Boy

=== Volume 1 ===
No.	Title	Writer(s)	Artist(s)	Length
1.	"Studio 54 (Note: Medley of "Heaven Must Have Sent You", "Dance, Dance, Dance (Yowsah, Yowsah, Yowsah)", "You Make Me Feel (Mighty Real)", "Disco Nights (Rock-Freak)", "Please Don't Let Me Be Misunderstood", "Haven't Stopped Dancing Yet", "Heart of Glass", "Contact" and "Keep On Dancin'")"	Holland-Dozier-Holland, Bernard Edwards, Nile Rodgers, Kenny Lehman, James Wirrick, Sylvester James, Emanuel LeBlanc, Herb Lane, Keith Crier, Paul Service, Bennie Benjamin, Horace Ott, Sol Marcus, Gloria Jones, Debbie Harry, Chris Stein, Edwin Starr, Robert Dickerson, Arthur Pullam III, Eric Matthew, Gary Turnier	The 54 Allstars	3:49
2.	"Keep On Dancin'"	Eric Matthew, Gary Turnier	Gary's Gang	5:21 (Note: shortened from the original 12" single version's runtime of 7:15)
3.	"The Boss"	Ashford & Simpson	Diana Ross	3:48
4.	"Dance, Dance, Dance (Yowsah, Yowsah, Yowsah)"	Bernard Edwards, Nile Rodgers, Kenny Lehman	Chic	3:35
5.	"Vertigo/Relight My Fire"	Dan Hartman	Dan Hartman	8:01 (Note: shortened from the original album/12" single version's runtime of 9:44)
6.	"You Make Me Feel (Mighty Real)"	James Wirrick, Sylvester James	Sylvester	3:42
7.	"Move On Up"	Curtis Mayfield	Destination	5:28 (Note: shortened from the original 12" single version's runtime of 8:34)
8.	"Love Machine (Part 1)"	Billy Griffin, Warren "Pete" Moore	The Miracles	2:51
9.	"Contact"	Robert Dickerson, Arthur Pullam, Edwin Starr	Edwin Starr	3:37
10.	"Knock on Wood"	Eddie Floyd, Steve Cropper	Mary Griffin	3:42
11.	"Let's Start the Dance"	Hamilton Bohannon	Bohannon	3:34
12.	"I Got My Mind Made Up"	Kim Miller, Scotty Miller, Raymond Earl	Instant Funk	5:12
13.	"Young Hearts Run Free"	David Crawford	Candi Staton	4:03
14.	"Native New Yorker"	Sandy Linzer, Denny Randell	Odyssey	5:28
15.	"Que Sera Mi Vida"	Nelly Byl, Jean Kluger	Gibson Brothers	6:04 (Note: shortened from the original 12" single version's runtime of 6:51)
16.	"Wishing on a Star"	Billie Rae Calvin	Rose Royce	3:57
Total length:				1:12:12

54: Music from the Miramax Motion Picture, Volume 2

Soundtrack album by Various
- Released: August 4, 1998
- Recorded: 1974–1998
- Genre: Disco
- Length: 1:08:08
- Label: Tommy Boy

=== Volume 2 ===
No.	Title	Writer(s)	Artist(s)	Length
1.	"If You Could Read My Mind"	Gordon Lightfoot	Stars on 54: Ultra Naté, Amber and Jocelyn Enriquez	3:25
2.	"Haven't Stopped Dancing Yet"	Gloria R. Jones	Gonzalez	4:47 (Note: shortened from the original 12" single version's runtime of 8:02)
3.	"Heaven Must Have Sent You"	Holland-Dozier-Holland	Bonnie Pointer	3:29
4.	"Loving Is Really My Game"	Trenita Womack, Belita Woods	Brainstorm	4:45 (Note: shortened from the original 12" single version's runtime of 7:39)
5.	"Disco Nights (Rock-Freak)"	Emanuel LeBlanc, Herb Lane, Keith Crier, Paul Service	GQ	3:52
6.	"Found a Cure"	Ashford & Simpson	Ashford & Simpson	5:08 (Note: shortened from the original album/12" single version's runtime of 7:02)
7.	"Don't Leave Me This Way"	Kenneth Gamble, Leon Huff, Cary Gilbert	Thelma Houston	3:35
8.	"Come to Me"	Tony Green	France Joli	4:11
9.	"Take Your Time (Do It Right)"	Harold Clayton, Sigidi	The S.O.S. Band	4:36 (Note: shortened from the original album/12" single version's runtime of 7:40)
10.	"Please Don't Let Me Be Misunderstood"	Bennie Benjamin, Horace Ott, Sol Marcus	Santa Esmeralda	3:29 (Note: shortened from the original 7" single version's runtime of 3:53)
11.	"Spank"	Ronald L. Smith	Jimmy "Bo" Horne	5:01 (Note: shortened from the original 12" single version's runtime of 6:10)
12.	"Galaxy"	Howard E. Scott, Charles Miller, Harold Ray Brown, Jerry Goldstein, B.B. Dickerson, Lee Oskar, Lonnie Jordan, Thomas "Papa Dee" Allen	War	4:36 (Note: shortened from the original album version's runtime of 8:11)
13.	"I Need a Man"	Paul Adrian Slade, Pierre Papadiamandis	Grace Jones	3:19
14.	"Heart of Glass"	Debbie Harry, Chris Stein	Blondie	3:19
15.	"Cherchez La Femme/Se Si Bon"	Stony Browder Jr., August Darnell, John Schonberger, Richard Coburn, Vincent Rose	Dr. Buzzard's Original Savannah Band	5:40
16.	"Fly, Robin, Fly"	Sylvester Levay, Stephan Prager	Silver Convention	4:56 (Note: shortened from the original album version's runtime of 5:32)
Total length:				1:08:08

== Home media ==
A 2012 Blu-ray release features several additional and alternate scenes that were not included in the theatrical release. This extended cut runs 100 minutes, eight minutes of which are not in the studio's 92-minute release. Miramax and Lionsgate Home Entertainment released 54: The Director's Cut in digital HD on streaming video providers on June 2, 2015. A Blu-ray version of this cut was released in 2016.

== Bibliography ==
- Biskind, Peter (2004). Down and Dirty Pictures: Miramax, Sundance, and the Rise of Independent Film. New York: Simon & Schuster. ISBN 978-0-684-86258-3.
