= Boogie's Gonna Getcha: '80s New York Boogie =

Compilation album by Various Artists
- Released: December 26, 2009; January 2, 2010
- Genre: Boogie, post-disco, garage
- Label: BackBeats

Boogie's Gonna Getcha: '80s New York Boogie is a compilation album in a BackBeats series released in 2010 on the Demon Music Group-sublabel BackBeats. The album was compiled by British music producer Ian Dewhirst and it was released on CD and contains twelve original boogie and post-disco tracks. In the United States, most of the songs were either underground and/or entered the Billboard Dance charts. However, in the United Kingdom it had some success especially on the pop chart, including "On The One" (#72) and "Please Don't Break My Heart" (#77).

The album mainly features artists of the SAM Records label, namely Convertion, Komiko, Klassique, Glen Adams Affair, Vicky "D" and Rhyze.

== Reception ==
Professional ratings
Review scores
Source	Rating
Allmusic	3.5/5 stars

The Allmusic review by Andy Kellman introduces the album: "Boogie's Gonna Getcha focuses on the electronics-enhanced post-disco R&B that came out of New York City during the early '80s" but states that "Back Beats digs a little deeper, but not so deep that even the keenest collectors lose interest."

== Track listing ==
Side one
No.	Title	Artist	Length
1.	"Share The Night" (Original 12" Mix)	World Premiere	7:16
2.	"Please Don't Break My Heart" (Original 12" Mix)	The Affair feat. Alyson Williams	5:49
3.	"Main Thing" (Original 12" Mix)	Shot feat. Kim Marsh	5:46
4.	"This Beat Is Mine" (Original 12" Mix)	Vicky "D"	5:54
5.	"Just How Sweet Is Your Love" (Original 12" Mix)	Rhyze	6:04
6.	"Hold On" (Original 12" Mix)	Kreamcicle	6:03
7.	"Just A Groove" (Original 12" Mix)	Glen Adams Affair	6:18
8.	"On The One" (Original 12" Mix)	Lukk feat. Felicia Collins	5:28
9.	"Rapper's Revenge" (Original 12" Mix)	Mike Gee	5:40
10.	"Let's Do It" (Original 12" Mix)	Convertion	8:19
11.	"Somebody's Loving You" (Original 12" Mix)	Klassique	6:36
12.	"Feel Alright" (Original 12" Mix)	Komiko	6:05

== Personnel ==
"Share The Night"

- Year: 1983
- Composers: Bernard Bullock, Douglas Pittman

"Please Don't Break My Heart"

- Year: 1985
- Composers: John F. Adams, Van Gibbs

"Main Thing"

- Year: 1986
- Composer: Roger "Wolfie" Williams

"This Beat Is Mine"

- Year: 1982
- Composer: André Booth

"Just How Sweet Is Your Love"

- Year: 1980
- Composers: Leon Stuckey, Paul Kyser

"Hold On"

- Year: 1982
- Composer: Wayne Brathwaite

"Just A Groove"

- Year: 1980
- Composer: Glen Adams

"On The One"

- Year: 1985
- Composers:Ken Krasner, Lenny Underwood

"Rapper's Revenge"

- Year: 1984
- Composers: Leroy Burgess, Mike Goodhope

"Let's Do It"

- Year: 1980
- Composers: James Calloway, Leroy Burgess, Sonny T. Davenport

"Somebody's Loving You"

- Year: 1983
- Composer: Linda Kane

"Feel Alright"

- Year: 1982
- Composer: Nick Braddy
