= List of post-disco artists =

The term post-disco is a referral to the early to late 1980s era movement of disco music into more stripped-down electronic funk influenced sounds; post-disco was also predecessor to house music.

This chronological list contains examples of artists described as post-disco.

== Notes ==
± indicates a Rock and Roll Hall of Fame inductee whether individually and/or as part of a group

== A ==
- Aurra

== B ==
- ± David Bowie (Let's Dance period)
- Sharon Brown

== D ==
- D Train
- The Deele

== E ==
- ESG

== G ==
- Gloria Gaynor (1980s)
- Gwen Guthrie

== H ==
- Holy Ghost!

== I ==
- Imagination

== J ==
- ± Michael Jackson
- ± Janet Jackson
- Grace Jones

== K ==
- Kerrier District
- Kid Creole and the Coconuts
- Evelyn "Champagne" King (1980s)
- Klein + M.B.O.
- ± Kool & the Gang (1980s)

== L ==
- Lakeside
- Liquid Liquid
- Logg

== M ==
- ± Madonna
- Metro Area
- ± George Michael
- Midnight Star

== P ==
- Peech Boys
- Polyrock

== R ==
- Sharon Redd
- Patrice Rushen

== S ==
- Shalamar
- Shannon
- The S.O.S. Band
- Edmund Sylvers

== U ==
- Unlimited Touch

== V ==
- Vicky D

== W ==
- Was (Not Was)
- Jody Watley
- Wham!
- The Whispers (1980s)

== See also ==
- List of dance-pop artists
- List of dance-rock artists
- List of funk musicians
- List of house music artists
