= Keep On Dancin' (Gary's Gang song) =

Single by Gary's Gang
- B-side: "Do It at the Disco"
- Released: February 1979
- Genre: Disco; pop; soul
- Length: 5:22
- Label: Columbia
- Songwriter(s): Eric Matthew; Gary Turnier

"Keep On Dancin'" is the debut single by Gary's Gang, a disco group from Queens, New York. The song became successful in several countries in 1979.

"Keep On Dancin'" peaked at number 15 on the US Soul Singles chart, number 41 on the US Billboard Hot 100, and number 33 on the Cash Box Top 100. In the UK, the song reached number eight, and number 31 in Canada. In 1990, the song re-charted in the UK for one week (#98).

Along with their tracks "Do It at the Disco" and "Let's Lovedance Tonight", "Keep On Dancin'" hit number one on the disco chart for one week. In 1999, "Let's Lovedance Tonight" was sampled by Soulsearcher in the number twenty dance hit, "Can't Get Enough".

== In film ==
- "Keep On Dancin'" was featured in the 1998 film and soundtrack of 54.
- "Keep On Dancin'" was featured in the 2018 Netflix documentary Studio54.

== Charts ==
=== Weekly charts ===
Chart (1979)	Peak position
Canada RPM Top Singles	31
Ireland (IRMA)	10
UK	8
U.S. Billboard Hot 100	41
U.S. Disco/Dance	1
U.S. R&B	15
U.S. Cash Box Top 100	33
