= Now! (France Joli album) =

Studio album by France Joli
- Released: June 15, 1982
- Recorded: 1981–1982
- Studio: Sigma Sound, New York City; Right Track, New York City
- Genre: Disco, Dance
- Length: 1:04:54
- Label: Unidisc
- Producer: Ray Reid, William Anderson, Darryl Payne, Eric Matthew, Giuliano Salerni

France Joli chronology
Tonight (1980)	Now! (1982)	Attitude (1983)

Now! is the third album by singer, France Joli, released in 1982. This album saw her shift away from the disco based songs of her early recordings, to a funkier soul music base. This change provided her with her biggest international hit, "Gonna Get Over You". It also includes the moderate dance chart hit, "Your Good Lovin'".

== Track listings ==
1. "Your Good Lovin'"
2. "Gonna Get Over You"
3. "Can We Fall in Love Again"
4. "I Wanna Take a Chance on Love"
5. "Now"
6. "I'm Still Thinking of You"
7. "I Need Someone"
8. "Everlasting Love"
9. "Gonna Get Over You" (12" Mix)
10. "Gonna Get Over You" (Instrumental)
11. "Te Olvidare" (Gonna Get Over You) (Spanish version)

== Personnel ==
- Lead Vocal - France Joli
- Backing Vocals – Fonzi Thornton (tracks: 1, 6), Dolette McDonald (tracks: 1, 6), Robin Clark (tracks: 1, 6)
- Backing Vocals – Barbara Ingram (tracks: 2 to 5, 7, 8), Carla Benson (tracks: 2 to 5, 7, 8), Evette Benton (tracks: 2 to 5, 7, 8)
- Bass – Arnold "Muki" Wilson, Fred Brown, Sandy Anderson
- Drums – Buddy Williams, Raymond Rock, Ray "Johnny" Reid
- Guitar – Dennis Weeden, Phil Hamilton, Ron Miller*, Steve Khan, William "Bubba" Anderson
- Percussion – Errol "Crusher" Bennett, Sammy Figueroa, Steve Thornton
- Acoustic Piano, Electric Piano – Galen "Lenny" Underwood
- Backing Vocals produced by – Giuliano Salerni (tracks: 1, 6)
- Producer – Darryl Payne (tracks: 1), Eric Matthew (tracks: 1)
- Producer, Arranged By – Ray Reid (tracks: 2 to 8), William Anderson (tracks: 2 to 8)
- Soloist, Tenor Saxophone – Dave Tofani
- Prophet 5, Acoustic Piano, Electric Piano – Andy Schwartz
- Prophet 5, Synthesizer – Clifford Branch Jr.
- Rhythm & Vocal Arranged by – Ray Reid, William Anderson
- Strings & Horns Arranged by – Giuliano Salerni

== Credits ==
- Production Coordinator – Gerry Kuster
- Musical Contractor – Jeff Delinko
- Engineer – John Potoker
- Assistant Engineer – Glen Rosenstein, Joan Meisel, Linda Randazzo, Matthew Weiner
- Mastered By – Herbie Jr.*
- Mixed By – Gene Leone (tracks: 4 to 5, 7, 8)
- Chair – George Kempler
- Photography By, Art Direction – Trudy Schlachter
- Clothing By – Andre Bailey
- Hair & Make-up By – Rick Gillette
- Jewelry By – Lu Willard
