= Divas of Disco =

Video by Linda Clifford, A Taste of Honey, Thelma Houston, France Joli & CeCe Peniston
- Released: 2008 (Europe); 2009 (USA)
- Recorded: April 25, 2007 in Avalon, Hollywood, California
- Genres: R&B; Soul; Dance
- Length: 112 min (Europe); 91 min (USA)
- Labels: ZYX Music (Europe); RSM Records (USA)
- Directors: David Brainard (film); Ed Roth (music); Joel Huxtable (lights)
- Producer: Michael Chernow

Divas of Disco is a live video album recorded on April 25, 2007, at Avalon, Hollywood, performed by CeCe Peniston, Thelma Houston, Linda Clifford, A Taste of Honey and France Joli. The whole concert was issued on CD in 2010.

The work was released in 2008 on ZYX Music for Europe, including bonus material (biographies and backstage interviews with singers), while in the United States on RSM Records in 2009.

== Track listings ==
No.	Title	Writer(s)	Performer(s)	Length
1.	"Runaway Love"	G. Askey	Linda Clifford	7:53
2.	"Red Light"	Michael Gore, Dean Pitchford	Linda Clifford	4:38
3.	"If My Friends Could See Me Now"	Cy Coleman, Dorothy Fields	Linda Clifford	5:21
4.	"Rescue Me"	Janice Marie Johnson, B. Miller, Roland Bautista	A Taste of Honey	3:54
5.	"Sukiyaki"	Rokusuke Ei, Hachidai Nakamura	A Taste of Honey	4:37
6.	"Boogie Oogie Oogie"	J. Johnson, P. Kibble	A Taste of Honey	8:24
7.	"You Make Me Feel (Mighty Real)/Dance (Disco Heat)"	J. Wirrick, Sylvester James	Thelma Houston	6:14
8.	"Love and Happiness"	Al Green, Teenie Hodges	Thelma Houston	5:04
9.	"Don't Leave Me This Way"	Kenneth Gamble, Leon Huff, C. Gilbert	Thelma Houston	5:35
10.	"Heart to Break the Heart"	A. Mazzone (aka T. Green)	France Joli	4:52
11.	"Gonna Get Over You"	Cat Anderson	France Joli	4:59
12.	"Come to Me"	A.Mazzone	France Joli	6:03
13.	"Keep On Walkin'"	Steve Hurley, M. Williams, Kym Sims	CeCe Peniston	6:49
14.	"Last Dance"	Paul Jabara	CeCe Peniston	5:55
15.	"Finally"	CeCe Peniston, Felipe Delgado, E.L. Linnear	CeCe Peniston	10:34
Total length:				90:52

European edition (Backstage)
No.	Title	Length
16.	"Biographies"
17.	"Interviews"

== Credits and personnel ==
- Linda Clifford - lead vocal
- Janice Marie Johnson - lead vocal
- Thelma Houston - lead vocal
- France Joli - lead vocal
- CeCe Peniston - lead vocal
- Jean McClain - back vocal
- Sabrina Sloan - back vocal
- Reggie Thornton - dancer
- Rodney Houston - dancer
- Ed Roth - music director, piano
- Bryant Simpson - bass guitar
- Linda Taylor - guitar
- Billy Steinway - keyboards
- Mitch Waddell - audio remix
- Damita Jo Freeman - choreography
- Michael Chernow - executive producer
- David Brainard - film director
- Joel Huxtable - lighting director
- Damon Gold - remote audio
- Videolines - remote facility
- Don Tartaro - production manager
- Ann-Riley Caldwell - stage manager
- Stephen Ford - talent coordinator
- Robert Tarango - contractor
- Alfonso Saldana - limo transportation
- LaVerne Tate - hair
- Rudy Calvo - make up
- Allen Mercer - photography

== CD release ==
Divas of Disco – Live

Live album by CeCe Peniston, Thelma Houston, Linda Clifford, A Taste of Honey & France Joli
- Released: February 26, 2010
- Recorded: April 25, 2007
- Genre: Dance music
- Length: 74:33
- Label: Pegasus Entertainment

CeCe Peniston chronology
EP Live (2007)	Divas of Disco – Live (2010)

Thelma Houston chronology
A Woman's Touch (2007)	Divas of Disco – Live (2010)

Singles from Divas of Disco – Live
- 1. "EP Live"

Unlike the DVD album, its CD equivalent missed additional tracks ("Runaway Love" by Linda Clifford, "Love and Happiness" by Thelma Houston, and "Heart to Break the Heart" by France Joli).

The album included Peniston's two number-one dance hits in the US, "Finally" and "Keep On Walkin'", and her cover version of Donna Summer's 1978 hit song, "Last Dance".

"Keep On Walkin'" was earlier issued as the virtual lead track of the Peniston digital "EP Live", released by One Media Publishing in 2008. In addition, a three track EP was available in CD-r format since January 14, 2011.

=== Track listing ===
No.	Title	Writer(s)	Performer(s)	Length
1.	"Red Light"	M.Gore, D.Pitchford	Linda Clifford	4:37
2.	"If My Friends Could See Me Now"	C.Coleman, D.Fields	Linda Clifford	6:10
3.	"Rescue Me"	J.Johnson, B.Miller, R.Bautista	A Taste of Honey	3:50
4.	"Sukiyaki"	R.Ei, H.Nakamura	A Taste of Honey	4:43
5.	"Boogie Oogie Oogie"	J.Johnson, P.Kibble	A Taste of Honey	8:37
6.	"You Make Me Feel (Mighty Real)/Dance (Disco Heat)"	J.Wirrick, S.James	Thelma Houston	5:49
7.	"Don't Leave Me This Way"	K.Gamble, L.Huff, C.Gilbert	Thelma Houston	5:50
8.	"Gonna Get Over You"	W.Anderson	France Joli	5:14
9.	"Come to Me"	T.Gree	France Joli	6:06
10.	"Keep On Walkin'"	S.Hurley, M.Williams, K.Sims	CeCe Peniston	6:53
11.	"Last Dance"	P.Jabara	CeCe Peniston	6:06
12.	"Finally"	C.Peniston, F.Delgado, E.L.Linnear	CeCe Peniston	10:38
Total length:				74:33

=== Credits and personnel ===
"Last Dance"
CeCe Peniston performing live her cover version of the Donna Summer's hit from 1978

- Linda Clifford - lead vocal
- Janice Marie Johnson - lead vocal
- Thelma Houston - lead vocal
- France Joli - lead vocal
- CeCe Peniston - lead vocal
- Jean McClain - back vocal
- Sabrina Sloan - back vocal
- Ed Roth - music director, piano
- Bryant Simpson - bass guitar
- Linda Taylor - guitar
- Billy Steinway - keyboards
- Mitch Waddell - audio remix
