= Radar Records (U.S. label) =

- Founded: 1982
- Founder: Joe Tucci
- Status: Defunct (merged with Unidisc Music)
- Genre: Garage house, post-disco
- Country of origin: U.S.
- Location: Richmond Hill, Queens, New York

Radar Records was a small independent New York City-based dance/garage label best known for Gary's Gang, Toney Lee, and various underground acts.

== History ==
=== Foundation ===
It was formed and operated by Eric Matthew (real name Joe Tucci) around 1982.

=== Structure ===
First record issued by Radar Records was possibly "Knock Me Out" by Gary's Gang, following by the post-disco number "Reach Up" by Toney Lee. Label creation was mentioned on the March 1983 issue of Billboard magazine.

The label includes (sorted by chart success)

- Toney Lee, who recorded "Reach Up" (Club #10, UK Pop #64)
- Gary's Gang, who recorded various dance hits like "Runaway", "Makin' Music" (Club #8) and "Knock Me Out" (Club #25).
- Fast Radio, who recorded "Under My Thumb" (Club #47)
- Status IV, who recorded "You Ain't Really Down" (Club #48)
- Barbara Fowler of Sinnamon, who recorded "Come And Get My Lovin'".

Radar Records was, after a couple of club hits, acquired by a Canada-based record company Unidisc Music. They also bought out other New York independent labels such as Prelude Records.

== Selected discography ==
Year	Catalog	Composition	Artist	Notes
1982	RDR-12000	"Knock Me Out"	Gary's Gang	—
1982	RDR-12001	"Reach Up"	Toney Lee	—
1982	RDR-12002	"Under My Thumb"	Fast Radio	—
1983	RDR-12003	"You Ain't Really Down"	Status IV	—
1983	RDR-12004	"Love So Deep"	Toney Lee	—
1983	RDR-12005	"Makin' Music"	Gary's Gang	—
1983	RDR-12006	"The Break"/"Breaker"	Richie Scotti	—
1983	RDR-12007	"I'm Out Of Your Life"	Arnie's Love	—
1983	RDR-12010	"Lovin' You"	Status IV	—
1983	RDR-12011	"Bomb Comes Down"	Serious Word + One	—
1983	RDR-12016	"Come And Get My Lovin'"	Barbara Fowler	—
