= Darryl Payne =

American songwriter

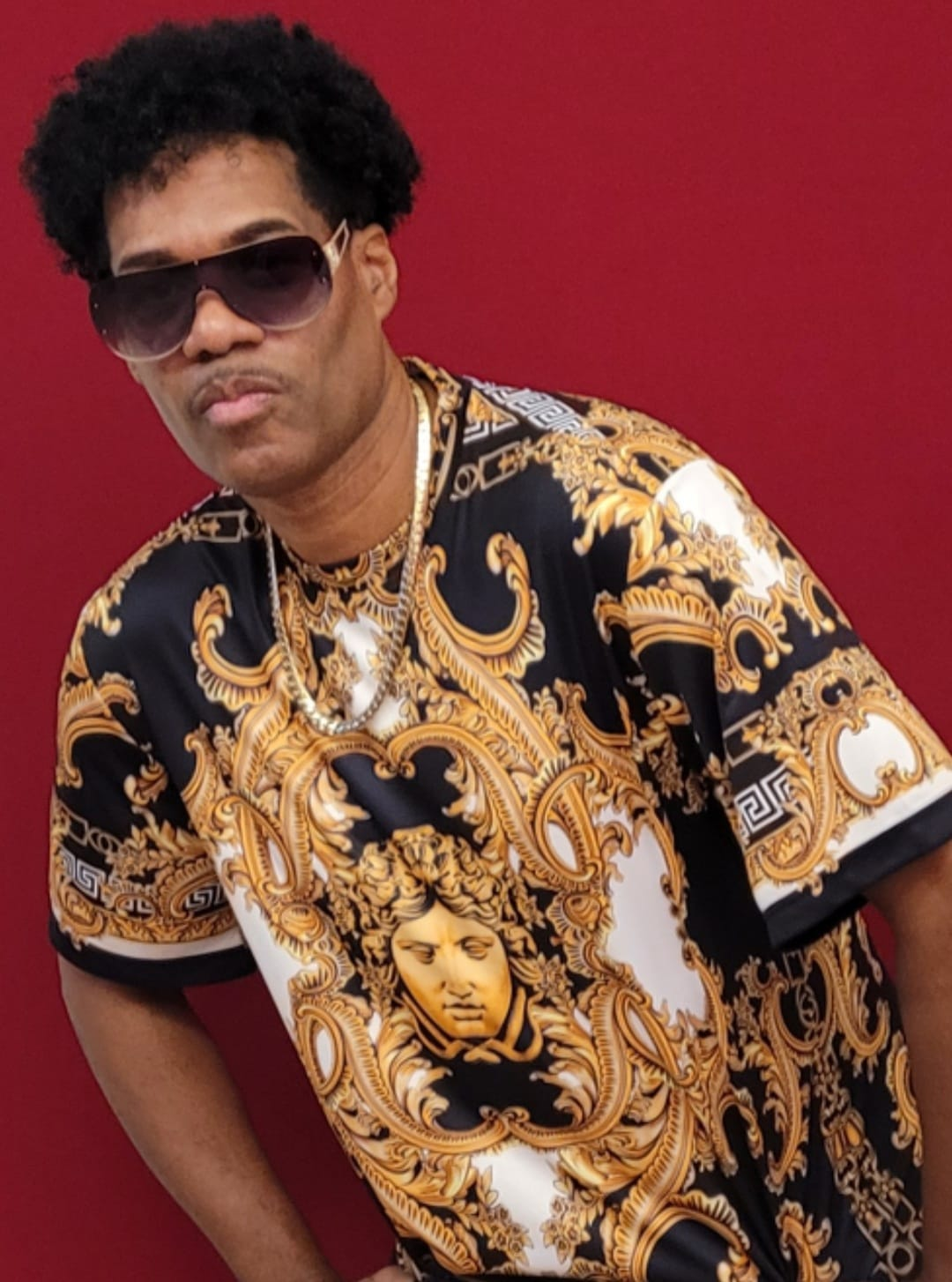

Background information
- Origin: Queens, New York, U.S
- Genres: Garage house Contemporary R&B; Post-disco
- Occupations: Producer; songwriter
- Labels: SAM; Prelude; Vanguard; Jive; New Image
- Website: http://darrylpayneproducer.com/

Darryl Raymond Payne (born 1960) is an American post-disco record producer and songwriter who worked on club and urban hits of artists like Sharon Redd or Sinnamon. He produced music mostly centered to SAM and Prelude record labels in the 1980s, and Warner Records, Sony BMG, and EMI in the 2010s.

== Production ==
After becoming dissatisfied with the music business Payne took a long hiatus of 10 years. Later, in the 2000s, Payne was then CEO of Classic World Productions and president of a now-dissolved company Jenstar Entertainment, Inc., formed by Richard W. Kuhn. About his return to music production, Payne adds "everybody is imitating everybody else—it all sounds a like. It's time to get back to the basics, the core of soul music." The company specialized in reissuing DVD versions of vintage TV programs featuring 1950s and 1960s performers like Judy Garland, The Four Tops, Little Richard or Tom Jones.

=== Albums ===
Year	Work	Credit
1975	Carol Douglas Album by Carol Douglas	Producer
1980	Sharon Redd by Sharon Redd	Producer
1982	Redd Hot by Sharon Redd	Producer

=== Songs ===
Year	Work	Credit
1974	"Check It Out" by Tavares	Arranger, Producer
1981	"No One Can Do It (Like You)" by Carol Williams	Producer
1982	"Beat The Street" by Sharon Redd	Producer
1982	"Your Good Lovin'" by France Joli	Producer
1982	"Hold On" by Kreamcicle	Producer
1982	"Never Give You Up" by Sharon Redd	Producer
1982	"Thanks to You" by Sinnamon	Producer
1982	"Feel Alright" by Komiko	Co-Producer
1983	"I Need You Now" by Sinnamon	Producer
1983	"You're The One" by Katie Kissoon	Producer
1983	"It's Allright" by [NV]	Producer
