= Carol Williams (singer) =

American singer-songwriter

- Origin: Montclair, New Jersey, U.S.
- Genres: Disco; Dance-pop
- Occupations: Background singer, singer, songwriter
- Instrument: Vocals
- Years active: 1975–present
- Labels: Salsoul Records (1970s); Vanguard (1980s); New Image Records (late 1980s)
- Formerly of: Komiko

Carol Williams, born in Montclair, New Jersey, is a vocalist and songwriter who achieved success with her disco songs in the 1970s. She was the first female artist signed to the disco label Salsoul Records.

Carol Williams was once a member of the post-disco/garage house studio project called Komiko.

== Career ==
Williams began her career working with producer Vincent Montana, Jr. and the Salsoul Orchestra. Her most notable recording, "More", was very popular at a time when disco was just breaking into the mainstream. The success of "More" led to the 'Lectric Lady album, released on Salsoul Records in 1976 and featured the singles "Come Back" and "Love Is You". The latter song was sampled in 1999 by Italian DJ Spiller in an instrumental track called "Groove Jet", on the Mighty Miami EP, and in 2000 in the vocal version of the track, called "Groovejet (If This Ain't Love)" with vocals performed by Sophie Ellis-Bextor. The track featuring Ellis-Bextor reached number one in the UK and Australia, and sparked renewed demand for the original.

Not long after the release of her album, Williams parted Salsoul Records. In 1978 she signed with Canadian label Roy B. Quality Records where she recorded a duet with singer producer Tony Valor "Love Has Come My Way". Her second album Reflections of Carol Williams was issued in 1979 and featured the singles "Tell the World" and "Dance the Night Away".

=== 1980s to present ===
She turned down Darryl Payne's song "Over Like a Fat Rat" and passed it to Fonda Rae because she wasn't fond of the concept of a song that is "about a rat," defending her position, "Anything I am singing has to make sense to me and tell a story." Rae's version which turned into a minor club hit was appraised by Williams, "[and] she did a fantastic job. The way they arranged it—it was amazing."

In 1982 she had a R&B hit "Can't Get Away (from Your Love)" on Vanguard label which did well on the Billboard dance chart peaking at number 38. "You've Reached the Bottom Line" was also a dance chart hit in 1983, and peaked at number 59.

Carol Williams is still performing spending up to ten hours a day in her Queens, New York City, recording studio. She actively does shows on disco flashback concerts and travels with her live band. Her songs have appeared on various Salsoul and Unidisc compilations.

In 2016 she co-wrote, co-produced and sang "It’s Gonna Be Different" with her musician son De-Verne Williams Jr.

== Discography ==
=== Albums ===
- 'Lectric Lady (1976, Salsoul Records)
- Reflections of Carol Williams (1979, Quality Records)

=== Singles ===
Year	Single	Peak chart positions	
Year	Single	US R&B	US Dance
1975	"Rattlesnake"	―	—
1976	"Just Feel"	―	—
1976	"More"	98	―
1977	"Come Back / Love Is You"	—	29
1979	"I Need You Baby / Love Constitution"	―	―
1979	"Dance the Night Away"	―	—
1980	"One More Time"	—	—
1980	"Tell the World"	—	—
1981	"No One Can Do It (Like You)"	—	—
1982	"Can't Get Away (from Your Love)"	―	38
1982	"Shake (It Easy)" (with the Billy Mersey Band)	―	65
1983	"You've Reached the Bottom Line"	―	59
1986	"What's the Deal / Have You for My Love"	—	―
1987	"Queen of Hearts"	—	―
"—" denotes releases that did not chart or were not released in that territory.
