= Redd Hott =

Studio album by Sharon Redd
- Released: August 29, 1982
- Recorded: 1981–1982
- Studio: Eric Matthew
- Genre: Post-disco; funk; urban contemporary
- Label: Prelude
- Producer: Darryl Payne; Eric Matthew

Sharon Redd chronology
Sharon Redd (1980)	Redd Hott (1982)	Love How You Feel (1983)

Redd Hott is the second studio album by American singer Sharon Redd. In October 1982 all the cuts from this LP hit number one on the US Hot Dance Club Play chart for one week. Although none of the album's tracks made the Billboard Hot 100, "Beat the Street" made it to number 41 on the Hot R&B/Hip-Hop Songs chart. "Never Give You Up" peaked at number 20 on the UK Singles Chart.

== Track listing ==
Side A

1. "Never Give You Up" (Darryl Payne, Eric Matthew) – 7:00
2. "You're the One" (Payne, Matthew) – 6:20
3. "Send Your Love" (Payne, Matthew) – 6:57

Side B

1. "Beat the Street" (Payne, Matthew) – 5:40
2. "In the Name of Love" (Sharon Redd, Ricky Williams) – 6:30
3. "Takin' a Chance on Love" (Redd, Ruth Carson, Gene Redd, Matthew) – 5:02
4. "We're Friends Again" (S. Redd, Matthew) – 4:43

== Personnel ==
- Jay Leon – string and horn arrangements
- Carole Sylvan, Jocelyn Smith – backing vocals
- Eric Matthew – producer
- Recorded and mixed at Eric Matthew Studios

=== Other ===
- Lester Hyatt – clothing
- Rory Bernal / Beauty Bookings – hair, make-up
- Celia Sebire – jewelry
- Martin Snaric – stylist coordinator
- Linda Edwards – stylist
- Trudy Schlachter – photography
- Ruth E. Carson – album coordinator

== Charts ==
Chart performance for Redd Hot
Chart (1982)	Peak position
UK Albums (OCC)	59
