= Love Is You =

Love Is You may refer to:

- Love Is You (EP), an EP by Cherry Belle
- "Love Is You", a 1977 single by Carol Williams, sampled in the 2000 song "Groovejet (If This Ain't Love)" by Spiller featuring Sophie Ellis-Bextor
- "Love Is You", an instrumental song by Santana from their 1987 album Freedom
- Love Is You, a 1987 album by Barrett Strong
- "Love Is You", a 1987 song by BeBe Winans with Marvin Winans
- "Love Is You", a 2008 single by Thomas Godoj
