= Thanks to You =

Single by Sinnamon
- Released: May 22, 1982
- Genre: Post-disco
- Length: 6:59 (The Shep Pettibone Mix)
- Label: Becket (US BKD 508)
- Songwriter(s): Darryl Payne, Eric Matthew, Keith Diamond
- Producer(s): Darryl Payne, Eric Matthew

Sinnamon singles chronology
"He's Gonna Take You Home (To His House)" (1982)	"Thanks to You" (1982)	"I Need You Now" (1983)

"Thanks to You" is a song by American female vocal trio Sinnamon, released as a single in 1982. It was a hit on the dance charts, hitting number one for two weeks in mid-1982. It also reached number 44 on the Hot Soul Singles chart.

== Track listing ==
- 12" single

Side one
No.	Title	Length
1.	"Thanks to You"	6:59

Side two
No.	Title	Length
1.	"Thanks to You" (Instrumental)	7:55
2.	"Thanks to You" (Fierce Reprise)	6:05

== Chart positions ==
Chart (1982)	Peak position
U.S. Billboard Hot Dance Club Play	1
U.S. Billboard Hot Black Singles	44
