= Sam Weiss =

Sam Weiss may refer to:

- Sam Weiss (born 1926), American founder of SAM Records
- Sam Weiss (Fringe), a Fringe character
