= Disco Not Disco 2 =

Compilation album by Various Artists
- Released: March 19, 2002
- Genre: Post-disco; No Wave; Alternative dance Post-punk
- Length: 55:33
- Label: Strut
- Producer: Joey Negro

VA - Disco Not Disco chronology
Disco Not Disco (2000)	Disco Not Disco 2 (2002)	Disco Not Disco 3 (2008)

Professional ratings
Review scores
Source	Rating
Allmusic	4/5 stars
Stylus Magazine	B−

Disco Not Disco 2 is a compilation album from the Disco Not Disco series released by Strut Records in 2002. As with the first installment, this album focuses on the experimental side of disco and punk genres and underground music scene in general. The second volume is oriented more towards electro and dance music. It features electro pioneer Alexander Robotnick ("Problèmes D'Amour"), post-punk and dance-rock music groups like Laid Back, Material and The Clash, Can, and Arthur Russell.

As with the first installment in the series, it was compiled by British DJ and music producer Joey Negro.

== Critical reception ==
Andy Kellman of Allmusic gave the album 4 stars, stating that "despite all the advances made in dance music in the decades that followed the greatness featured here, the lasting value is undeniable." On the other hand, Scott Plagenhoef of Stylus Magazine gave the album B−, saying "So bag the preconceptions and get on the floor—embrace these beats without process and listen without prejudice. And while you're at it, grab the stronger Disco (Not Disco) as well".

== Track listing ==
No.	Title	Writer(s)	Artist	Length
1.	"White Horse"	John Guldberg, Tim Stahl	Laid Back	5:44
2.	"Problèmes D'Amour"	Giampiero Bigazzi, Giancarlo Bigazzi, Maurizio Dami	Alexander Robotnick	6:44
3.	"Bostich" (Extended Dance Version)	Boris Blank, Dieter Meier	Yello	4:34
4.	"Aspectacle" (Holger Czukay Edit)	Can	Can	2:48
5.	"Ciguri"	Bill Laswell, Fred Maher, Robert Quine	Material	7:15
6.	"Get Down"	Noel Williams	Connie Case	5:51
7.	"Timewarp"	Eddy Grant	The Coach House Rhythm Section	5:51
8.	"Let's Go Swimming"	Arthur Russell	Arthur Russell	7:51
9.	"Sting" (Part One)	Barry Waite	Barry Waite & Ltd.	3:11
10.	"Fourteen Days" (Part 1)	Thomas Schwebel, Uwe Bauer, Uwe Jahnke	Lex	5:49
11.	"This Is Radio Clash"	The Clash	The Clash	4:11

== Personnel ==
"White Horse"

- Producers: Laidback

"Problèmes D'Amour"

- Vocals: Martine Michellod
- Vocals, Electric guitar, programmed by: Maurizio Dami
- Recorded by: Marzio Benelli
- Producer: Arlo Bigazzi, Giampiero Bigazzi, Maurizio Dami

"Bostich" (Extended Dance Version)

- Percussion: Beat Ash
- Remix: Ian Tregoning
- Producer: Yello

"Aspectacle" (Holger Czukay Edit)

- Editing: Holger Czukay

"Ciguri"

- Drums, electric guitar, vocals: Fred Maher
- Guitar: Robert Quine
- Bass guitar: Bill Laswell
- Vocals, synthesizer: Michael Beinhorn

"Get Down"

- Producer: Noel Williams

"Timewarp"

- Producer: Eddy Grant

"Let's Go Swimming"

- Editing: Killer Whale
- Producer: Mark Freedman
- Producer, composer: Arthur Russell

"Sting" (Part One)

- Producer: J. & N.

"Fourteen Days"

- Arrangement: Jeff Schack
- Mixing, producer: Ray "Pinky" Velazquez

"This Is Radio Clash"

- Producer: The Clash
- Saxophone/Electric Saxophone: Gary Barnacle
