= Tracy Weber =

Tracy Weber may refer to:

- Tracy Weber (journalist)
- Tracy Weber (singer)
