= Can You Handle It =

1980 song by Sharon Redd

Single by Sharon Redd

from the album Sharon Redd
- B-side: "Leaving You Is Easier Said Than Done"
- Released: May 21, 1980
- Genre: Disco
- Length: 6:26
- Label: Prelude (US); Epic (UK)
- Songwriters: Rodney Brown; Willie Lester
- Producers: Willie Lester; Rodney Brown

Sharon Redd singles chronology
"Easy to Be Hard" (1969)	"Can You Handle It" (1980)	"Love Is Gonna Get Ya" (1980)

"Can You Handle It" is a song by American singer Sharon Redd. It was released in May 21, 1980 as the first single from her self-titled debut album (1980). It charted on the US Billboard Dance and R&B charts, and at No. 31 in the UK.

== Charts ==
Chart (1981)	Peak position
Finland (Suomen virallinen lista)	27
UK Singles (OCC)	31
US Hot Dance Club Songs (Billboard)	5
US Hot Soul Singles (Billboard)	57

== DNA version ==
"Can You Handle It"

Single by DNA featuring Sharon Redd

from the album Taste This
- B-side: Theme II (Language Mix) (7")
- Released: 1992
- Recorded: 1991
- Genre: House; dance
- Length: 5:37
- Label: EMI
- Songwriters: Rodney Brown; Willie Lester
- Producers: DNA; Neil Davidge

DNA singles chronology
"Rebel Woman" (1991)	"Can You Handle It" (1992)	"Blue Love (Call My Name)" (1992)

In 1992, English production duo DNA released a remix of the song, credited as DNA featuring Sharon Redd, which appeared on their debut album, Taste This (1992). This version reached No. 17 on the UK Singles Chart and also charted in Australia, Finland, Ireland, New Zealand and the Netherlands.

=== Charts ===
==== Weekly charts ====
Chart (1992)	Peak position
Australia (ARIA)	172
Europe (European Dance Radio)	1
Finland (Suomen virallinen lista)	7
Ireland (IRMA)	29
Netherlands (Dutch Top 40 Tipparade)	14
Netherlands (Single Top 100)	62
New Zealand (Recorded Music NZ)	41
UK Singles (OCC)	17
UK Airplay (Music Week)	5
UK Dance (Music Week)	10
UK Club Chart (Music Week)	21

==== Year-end charts ====
Chart (1992)	Position
Europe (European Dance Radio)	20
