= Disco Not Disco =

Compilation album by various artists
- Released: September 2000
- Recorded: May 1981 – June 1985
- Genre: Post-disco, no wave, experimental, free jazz
- Length: 77:30
- Label: Strut
- Producer: Joey Negro

Disco Not Disco chronology
Disco Not Disco (2000)	Disco Not Disco 2 (2002)

Professional ratings
Review scores
Source	Rating
Allmusic	4.5/5 stars

Disco Not Disco is a compilation album from the Disco Not Disco series released by Strut Records in 2000. The album is a probe for both the experimental side of disco and punk genres, as well as underground music scene in general. The first volume is more rock and funk oriented and features three experimental studio projects by Arthur Russell, namely Dinosaur, Indian Ocean and Loose Joints, British new wave musician Ian Dury, and even musicians like Yoko Ono, Steve Miller Band or jazz trumpeter Don Cherry.

It was compiled by Joey Negro, a British DJ and producer. and Sean P. Some songs included on this album charted on the Billboard Club chart. The song "Cavern" by Liquid Liquid had famously been used in Grandmaster Flash song called "White Lines (Don't Do It)".

== Critical reception ==
Andy Kellman of Allmusic gave the album 4.5 of 5 stars, stating that "not only does the music stand on its own (there's a reason why thousands of young DJs and vinyl hounds collapsed in confoundment upon finding out that these rare gems were being issued together), but the liner notes provide a story behind each song, only adding to the mystique."

== Track listing ==
No.	Title	Writer(s)	Artist	Length
1.	"Walking on Thin Ice" (1981 Re-edit)	Yoko Ono	Yoko Ono	7:20
2.	"Cavern"	Liquid Liquid	Liquid Liquid	5:21
3.	"Tell You (Today)" (Vocal)	Arthur Russell	Loose Joints	7:02
4.	"Spasticus Autisticus"	Chas Jankel, Ian Dury	Ian Dury & The Seven Seas Players	6:59
5.	"Over and Over" (Long Version)	Bill Laswell, Fred Maher, Michael Beinhorn, Ronald Drayton	Material	5:39
6.	"Wheel Me Out"	David Was, Don Was	Was (Not Was)	7:09
7.	"Kiss Me Again" (Original Edit)	Arthur Russell	Dinosaur L	6:52
8.	"I Walk"	Ramuntcho Matta	Don Cherry	3:13
9.	"Voices Inside My Head"	Sting	Common Sense	6:33
10.	"Tree House / School Bell" (Part 1)	Arthur Russell	Indian Ocean	6:56
11.	"Macho City"	Steve Miller	The Steve Miller Band	16:26

== Personnel ==
"Walking on Thin Ice" (1981 Re-edit)

- Engineers: Lee DeCarlo, Sam Ginsberg
- Drums: Andy Newmark
- Bass guitar: Tony Levin
- Rhythm guitar: Earl Slick, Hugh McCracken
- Editing: Joseph Watt
- Producers: Jack Douglas, John Lennon, Yoko Ono

"Cavern"

- Drums, percussion: Scott Hartley
- Vocals, percussion: Salvatore Principato
- Percussion, bass guitar: Richard McGuire
- Percussion: Dennis Young

"Tell You (Today)" (Vocal)

- Mixing: Eddie Garcia, Larry Levan, Robert Morety
- Producers: Killer Whale, Steve D'Acquisto

"Spasticus Autisticus" (Version)

- Mixing: Steven Stanley
- Bass: Robbie Shakespeare
- Prophet synthesizer: Tyrone Downie
- Electric guitar: Chas Jankel
- Vocals: Ian Dury
- Drums: Sly Dunbar

"Over and Over" (Long Version)

- Producer: Fred Maher

"Wheel Me Out"

- Producers: David Was, Don Was, Jack Tann

"Kiss Me Again" (Original Edit)

- Remix: Dinosaur L
- Producer: Arthur Russell, Nicky Siano

"I Walk"

- Producer: Ramuntcho Matta
- Engineer: Michel Reynaud

"Voices Inside My Head"

- Producer: Began Cekic

"Tree House / School Bell" (Part 1)

- Producer: Arthur Russell, Peter Zummo

"Macho City"

- Drums, percussion: Gary Mallaber
- Vocals, guitar: Steve Miller
- Bass guitar: Gerald Johnson
- Keyboards: Byron Allred
