= Disco Not Disco 3 =

Compilation album by Various Artists
- Released: January 15, 2008
- Genres: Post-punk, alternative dance, no wave, post-disco, jazz fusion, dance-punk
- Length: 74:59
- Label: Strut

VA - Disco Not Disco chronology
Disco Not Disco 2 (2002)	Disco Not Disco 3 (2008)

Professional ratings
Review scores
Source	Rating
Allmusic	4/5 stars
Pitchfork Media	(6.2/10)

Disco Not Disco 3, also known as Disco Not Disco: Post Punk, Electro & Leftfield Disco Classics 1974–1986, is the third and final compilation album from the Disco Not Disco series released by Strut Records in 2008. The album is a probe to experimental side of disco and punk genres and underground music scene in general. The second volume is more post-punk oriented and features artists like Yellow Magic Orchestra, Vivien Goldman, Delta 5, James White and The Blacks, Maximum Joy, and others.

This last compilation album of the Disco Not Disco series was compiled by Last Night a DJ Saved My Life co-author Bill Brewster and Strut Records owner and founder Quinton Scott.

The album contains a 1981 proto-techno track "Sharevari" by A Number of Names.

== Critical reception ==
Andy Kellman of AllMusic gave the album 4 stars, he said that "considering the timing and context, the disc is every bit as replayable as the second volume." While Andy Battaglia of Stylus Magazine gave the album 6.2 from 10, saying that "the original impulse behind Disco Not Disco was monumental, but that same monumentality eats away at the new third volume of the series, which arrives on the other side of a revolution whose most important battles have already been fought and won."

== Track listing ==
No.	Title	Writer(s)	Artist	Length
1.	"Launderette"	George Oban, Vivien Goldman	Vivien Goldman	3:44
2.	"Mind Your Own Business"	Julz Sale, Kelvin Knight, Simon Best, Bethan Peters, Rosalind Allen, Alan Riggs	Delta 5	3:10
3.	"My Spine Is the Bassline" (12" Edit)	Barry Andrews, Carl Marsh, Dave Allen	Shriekback	3:59
4.	"Your Life"	Robert Vlcek	Konk	7:22
5.	"Crunch Cake"	Frank Roberts	Isotope	3:55
6.	"Contort Yourself" (August Darnell Remix)	James Sigfried	James White & The Blacks	6:13
7.	"Love Tempo" (Remix)	Hillegonda Rietveld, Mike Pickering	Quando Quango	7:52
8.	"Seoul Music"	Ryuichi Sakamoto	Yellow Magic Orchestra	4:47
9.	"Don't Lose Control"	Michael Beinhorn, Bill Laswell	Material	4:16
10.	"Binary"	Nicolas Finn, Pierre-Henri Steyt	Kazino	3:53
11.	"Los Niños Del Parque" (12" Mix)	Beate Bartel, Chrislo Haas, Krishna Goineau	Liaisons Dangereuses	5:01
12.	"Sharevari" (Instrumental)	Paul Leslie, Roderick Simpson, Sterling Jones	A Number of Names	6:14
13.	"Beat 'Em Right"	Angel C. Helighy, Rick Holliday	Six Sed Red	6:18
14.	"Silent Street / Silent Dub"	Maximum Joy, Tony Wrafter	Maximum Joy	7:42

== Personnel ==
"Launderette"

- Violin: Vicky Aspinall
- Electric guitar, bass guitar: Keith Levene
- Composer, vocals: Vivien Goldman
- Composer: George Oban
- Bass guitar, piano: Steve Beresford

"Mind Your Own Business"

- Composer, vocals: Julz Sale
- Composer, bass guitar, vocals: Bethan Peters, Rosalind Allen
- Composer, electric guitar: Alan Riggs
- Producer: Delta 5, Rob Warr

"My Spine Is the Bassline"

- Producer: Shriekback

"Crunch Cake"

- Electric guitar: Gary Boyle
- Bass guitar: Dan K. Brown
- Drums: Nigel Morris
- Synthesizer, vocals, clavinet: Zoe Kronberger
- Composer, piano, synthesizer: Frank Roberts
- Producer: Robin Lumley

"Contort Yourself" (August Darnell Remix)

- Remix: August Darnell
- Electric guitar: Jody Harris
- Bass guitar: George Scott
- Drums: Don Christensen
- Keyboards: Adele Bertei
- Backing vocals: Anya Phillips
- Saxophone, lead vocals, producer, arrangement: James White
- Engineer: Bob Blank

"Love Tempo" (Remix)

- Remix: Mark Kamins
- Engineer: Stewart Pickering

"Seoul Music"

"Don't Lose Control"

- Remix: John Luongo
- Bongos: Daniel Ponce
- Drums: Tony Thompson
- Composer, bass guitar: Bill Laswell
- Composer, synthesizer: Michael Beinhorn
- Producer: Material

"Binary"

- Producer: Yves Roze

"Los Niños Del Parque" (12" Mix)

- Producer: Beate Bartel, Chrislo Haas

"Sharevari" (Instrumental)

- Arrangement: Judson Powell, Robert Taylor

"Beat 'Em Right"

- Electric guitar: Marty Williamson
- Bass guitar, dub: Stephen Mallinder
- Additional percussion: Andy Johnson
- Producer: Cabaret Voltaire, Six Sed Red

"Silent Street / Silent Dub"

- Producer – Dick O'Dell, John Walker, Pete Mayburn
