= France Joli =

Canadian singer

- Also known as: France Joli
- Born: France Joly; February 2, 1963 (age 63); Montreal, Quebec, Canada
- Genres: Disco; soul; dance-pop, Eurodance; hi-NRG
- Occupations: Singer; songwriter; performer
- Years active: 1979–present
- Labels: Prelude Records; Epic/CBS
- Website: Official website

France Joli (French: [fʁɑ̃s ʒɔli]; née Joly; born February 2, 1963) is a Canadian singer, best known for the disco classics "Come to Me" and "Gonna Get Over You".

== Teen stardom ==
Born France Joly in Montreal, Quebec, Canada, Joli grew up in Dorion. Her father was a hardware merchant and her mother was a teacher.

As early as age four, Joli was performing for relatives lip-syncing to Barbra Streisand records while handling a skipping rope like a microphone; she had appeared on television by age six. At age 11, Joli left the public school system (her mother tutored her) to concentrate on her performing career by appearing regularly in television commercials and talent shows. A mutual acquaintance suggested Joli meet up with musician Tony Green whom Joli approached backstage after he had given a concert, with Joli inviting Green to be her record producer. Green did not take the 13-year-old Joli seriously: he recalled: "To get rid of her I [told] her to keep in touch." According to one source, Joli eventually visited Green's home to sing for him; it is also reported that Green first heard Joli sing from the audience of an "end-of-school-year show" in which she performed in the fall of 1978. Both accounts concur that Green first heard Joli singing along with a Streisand record. Green had written the song "Come to Me" for Joli by the next day.

When the producer Green originally commissioned to record Joli indicated a desire to develop Joli as a Francophone singer, Green himself took over production duties for Joli. The tracks Joli cut with Green were picked up by Prelude and released on April 17, 1979, as the album France Joli. The track "Come to Me" received a boost when Joli performed it as a last-minute replacement for Donna Summer at the Beach '79 party held on Fire Island on July 7, 1979 which was attended by 5,000 gay men.

"Come to Me" began a three-week reign atop the Billboard Hot Dance Club Play on September 22, 1979, and the France Joli album rose to No. 26. On the Billboard Hot 100. "Come to Me" peaked at No. 15 on November 17, 1979.

Joli made her network-television debut on October 26, 1979, broadcast of The Midnight Special and she co-hosted the December 7 episode. Her other TV credits included episodes of the talk shows of Mike Douglas, Merv Griffin and Dinah Shore, and also a Bob Hope special.

1980 saw the release of Joli's second album Tonight, with the ballad "This Time (I'm Giving All I've Got)" released as a single bubbling under for two weeks peaking at No. 103: this attempt to curry favor in the mainstream market was unsuccessful with Joli receiving support only in the dance-club market, where the tracks "The Heart to Break the Heart" and "Feel Like Dancing" achieved a joint position of No. 3: Tonight was ranked on the Billboard album chart at No. 175.

In 1981, Joli's third album Now – produced by Ray Reid and William Anderson from Crown Heights Affair rather than Tony Green^{1} – failed to generate even a low-chart placing, success apparent only in another dance-club smash with the track "Gonna Get Over You", which went to number two for two weeks on the American dance charts. However Joli, as evidenced by her opening for the Commodores during their American tour of 1981, was still viewed as having star potential: she departed the dance music-oriented Prelude label for Epic Records.

- ^{1}The track: "Your Good Lovin'" was arranged and produced by Prelude regulars Eric Matthew and Darryl Payne.
- ^{2}"Gonna Get Over You" reached No. 43 on the French Pop chart.

== Epic albums ==
Joli's Epic debut Attitude (1983), was produced by Pete Bellotte; Giorgio Moroder was credited as executive producer. The album personnel included Martin Page on electric guitar, Page's Q-Feel sideman Brian Fairweather on electric bass and Richie Zito on electric bass and electric guitar: Zito also performed arranging duties. The tracks included Joli's original "Dumb Blond" (co-written with Daniel Vail) and a remake of the Four Tops' "Standing in the Shadows of Love" which featured Gladys Knight's backing group the Pips; the latter was a moderate club success in tandem with the cuts "Girl in the 80s" and "Blue Eyed Technology" but despite a performance by Joli on Solid Gold the single "Girl in the 80s" – written by Jay Ferguson and Deborah Neal – garnered no evident mainstream interest.

Joli's next Epic release was Witch of Love (1985), produced by George Duke: prior to the album's release Joli had performed the Duke-penned track "Party Lights" at the Yamaha Music Festival in 1984 and had won the Grand Prix. The title cut of Witch of Love was a Joli-Vail composition as was the track "What About Me". However, as with Attitude, the choice for single was a Ferguson-Neal composition: the rather quirky "Does He Dance", which again failed at US radio – although it did become a Canadian airplay item – while becoming a moderate club hit boosted by a remix by Shep Pettibone.

The commercial failure of both of her Epic album releases led to the label dropping Joli, who spent the next ten years with her career focused on performing rather than recording.

== 1996 and 2000s ==
In 1996, Joli reunited with Tony Green for the single "Touch" on Popular Records. The original incarnation of the single was a CD single with Eurodance/Hi-NRG styled remixes intended for radio but received limited airplay. The song belatedly became a hit in clubs, reaching No. 24 on Hot Dance Music/Club Play, when new remixes by Darrin "Spike" Friedman were released on vinyl 12-inch single. There were two separate 12-inch singles released individually, each featuring a different Darrin Friedman remix, along with the other mixes from the CD single divided between the two records. The song became a regional hit in the New York tri-state area, as it was a favorite of DJs such as Jonathan Peters and Junior Vasquez at their weekly residencies.

The follow-up single "Breakaway" included remixes geared toward the underground clubs. Two different CD singles of "Breakaway" were released, Part 1 and Part 2. Part 1 had the Junior Vasquez and Eddie Baez mixes of "Breakaway," while Part 2 included additional remixes of "Breakaway," including a remix by Andy the Lamboy, as well one of the Darrin Friedman mixes of "Touch" and a previously unreleased Junior Vasquez mix of "Touch." Both "Touch" and "Breakaway" were featured on Joli's first album in 13 years, If You Love Me (1998).

In recent years, Joli has performed at clubs and private functions primarily in the New York City area: she has appeared multiple times at the annual KTU Disco Ball at Trump Plaza in Atlantic City, New Jersey.

Joli's "Come to Me" is featured in When Ocean Meets Sky (2003), a documentary detailing the 50-year history of the Fire Island Pines community. The film – which had its television premiere on June 10, 2006 – includes much previously unseen archival footage, but Joli's July 1979 performance of "Come to Me" is presented only in still photographs with musical background, suggesting no footage of that event exists. The sequence included interviews with those who recall Joli's 1979 performance on Fire Island. When Ocean Meets Sky is seen occasionally on the Logo channel. In addition, it was also featured in the 1998 movie 54, depicting the events at Studio 54 in New York.

== Discography ==
=== Albums ===
Year	Album	Peak chart positions		Label
Year	Album	US	US R&B	Label
1979	France Joli (re-released in 1994 as Come to Me)	26	25	Prelude
1980	Tonight	175	—	Prelude
1982	Now!	—	—	Prelude
1983	Attitude	—	—	Epic
1985	Witch of Love	—	—	Epic
1989	Greatest Hits	—	—	UniDisc
1998	If You Love Me	—	—	Popular
2010	Divas of Disco: Live (with CeCe Peniston, Linda Clifford, A Taste of Honey and Thelma Houston)	—	—	Pegasus
"—" denotes releases that did not chart or were not released in that territory.

=== Singles ===
Year	Single	Peak chart positions					Label
Year	Single	FR	US Hot 100	US R&B	US Adult	US Dance	Label
1979	"Come to Me"	65	15	36	47	1	Prelude
1979	"Don't Stop Dancing"	—	—	—	—	1	Prelude
1979	"Let Go"	—	—	—	—	—	Prelude
1980	"The Heart to Break the Heart"	—	—	—	—	3	Prelude
1980	"Feel Like Dancing"	—	—	—	—	3	Prelude
1980	"This Time"	—	103	—	—	—	Prelude
1981	"Gonna Get Over You"	43	—	—	—	2	Prelude
1982	"Your Good Lovin' "	—	—	—	—	53	Prelude
1982	"Can We Fall in Love Again"	—	—	—	—	53	Prelude
1983	"Girl in the 80's"	—	—	—	—	46	Epic
1984	"Blue Eyed Technology"	—	—	—	—	61	Epic
1985	"Does He Dance"	—	—	—	—	40	Epic
1997	"Touch"	—	—	—	—	24	Popular
1998	"Breakaway"	—	—	—	—	—	Popular
1998	"Save Me"	—	—	—	—	—	Monogram
2012	"Hallelujah"	—	—	—	—	—	n/a
"—" denotes releases that did not chart or were not released in that territory.

== See also ==
- List of Billboard number-one dance club songs
- List of artists who reached number one on the U.S. Dance Club Songs chart
