= Tonight (France Joli album) =

Studio album by France Joli
- Released: September 2, 1980
- Recorded: 1980
- Studio: Marko Studio, Montreal, and Alpha International Studios, Philadelphia
- Genre: Disco, dance
- Label: Unidisc
- Producer: Tony Green

France Joli chronology
France Joli (1979)	Tonight (1980)	Now! (1982)

Tonight is an album by France Joli, released in 1980 on the Prelude label. It is well known for the singles "The Heart to Break the Heart" and "Feel Like Dancing".

== Track listing ==
All songs written by Tony Green except where noted.

1. "The Heart to Break the Heart" (Remix)
2. "Feel Like Dancing"
3. "Tough Luck"
4. "This Time (I'm Giving All I've Got)"(Odette Springer/Susan Minski) US Peak # 103
5. "When Love Hurts Inside"
6. "Tonight"
7. "Stoned in Love"
8. "The Heart to Break the Heart" (Album version)
9. "The Heart to Break the Heart" (Instrumental)
10. "The Heart to Break the Heart" (Radio version)

== Personnel ==
- Lead Vocal - France Joli
- Additional lead vocal - Tony Green
- Strings & Horns Arranged by – Denis Lepage
- Girl-group Backing Vocals – Barbara Ingram, Carla Benson, Evette Benton
- Bass – Brian Smith
- Congas, Percussion, Tambourine – Miguel Fuentes
- Drums – Derek Kendrick
- Guitar – Tony Green
- Harp – Margau Morris
- Keyboards – Robby Goldfarb
- Producer, Arranged By – Tony Green
- Saxophone – Richard Beaudet
- Tambourine – Gene Leone
- Vibraphone – Jimmi Tanaka

== Credits ==
- Written and arranged for Tony Green Organization Records Ltd.
- Mastered at CBS Mastering Labs, NYC, and at Frankford/Wayne Mastering Labs, NYC
- Engineer – Claude Allard, Gene Leone
- Assistant Engineer – Clark Milioti, Evelyn Hertel, Michael Banghi
- Mastered By – Dominick Romeo, Stan Kalina
- Mixed By – Gene Leone
- Assisted & Mixed By – Tony Green
