= Raww =

- Origin: New York, New York, U.S.
- Genres: Garage house, post-disco
- Years active: 1986
- Labels: Emergency Records
- Past members: Ricky Martin, Robb Martin, Tyrone Martin

Raww was a United States-based short-lived music group best known for their hit "Don't You Try It", released by Emergency Records in 1986. The single was released worldwide, including Germany by Bellaphon, Spain by Grind and Canada by Power Records, Holland and Brussels and Belgium. It was written by the band's members whereas mixed by Freddy Bastone.

This song reached No. 34 on the American dance chart and also received acknowledgement from Billboard and was selected into "Recommended Section" of the Billboard's noteworthy picks.

== Chart performance ==
Year	Title	Label	Peak chart positions			
Year	Title	Label	Hot 100	Dance	R&B	Dance Sales
1986	"Don't You Try It"	Emergency	―	No. 34	―	No. 39

== Discography ==
=== Singles ===
"Don't You Try It"

U.S. 12" single^{(EMDS-6567)}	1. "Don't You Try It" - 6:25; 2. "Don't You Try It" - 7:49; Written-by: Tyrone Martin; Mixed-by: Freddy Bastone (side A), Julian Herzfeld (side B); Producer: Robb Martin, Tyrone Martin
