= List of dance-rock artists =

The following list includes notable dance-rock artists.

== Notes ==
± indicates a Rock and Roll Hall of Fame inductee whether individually and/or as part of a group

== Artists ==
- !!!
- ABC
- And Then There Were None
- The B-52's
- Belouis Some
- Big Audio Dynamite
- The Big Pink
- BodyRockers
- A Certain Ratio
- The Charlatans
- ± Depeche Mode
- Devo
- ± Duran Duran
- Electronic
- EMF
- ± Eurythmics
- The Farm
- Fine Young Cannibals
- Frankie Goes to Hollywood
- Franz Ferdinand
- Friendly Fires
- Gang of Four
- Garbage
- ± Hall & Oates
- Happy Mondays
- Hot Chelle Rae
- Hot Chip
- Billy Idol
- INXS
- ± Mick Jagger
- Jesus Jones
- The Killers
- LCD Soundsystem
- Liquid Liquid
- The New Cities
- New Order
- No Doubt
- Oingo Boingo
- Orchestral Manoeuvres in the Dark
- Robert Palmer
- Pet Shop Boys
- Primal Scream
- The Prodigy
- Pseudo Echo
- Public Image Ltd
- Rogue Traders
- Scissor Sisters
- The Shamen
- Simple Minds
- Soft Cell
- The Stone Roses
- ± Talking Heads
- Tom Tom Club
- ± U2
- Walk the Moon
- Was (Not Was)
- The White Tie Affair
- Robbie Williams
