= Vicky D =

New York-based post-disco group

Vicky "D"
- Also known as: Vicky Dee
- Origin: New York City, United States
- Genres: Boogie; Garage house
- Years active: 1981–1982
- Labels: SAM Records (US); Virgin Records (UK)

Vicky "D" was a short-lived New York City-based post-disco/garage house group best known for their club hit "This Beat Is Mine". Released in late 1981, the song peaked at number 11 on the Billboard Club Play Singles chart in February 1982, and peaked at number 42 on the UK Singles Chart in March 1982.

"This Beat Is Mine" was distributed by Sam Records in the US and Virgin Records in the UK.

== History ==
=== Background ===
Vicky "D" recorded two songs for Sam Records; uptempo dance hit "This Beat Is Mine" and uncharted reggae song "Mystery Lover", respectively. "This Beat Is Mine" was produced by Gary R. Turnier of Gary's Gang.

=== Legacy ===
Vicky D's recordings can be found on various compilation albums such as 80s Groove, Vol. II (Ministry of Sound), 100 Hits: 80s Dance (Demon Music Group) and Boogie's Gonna Getcha: '80s New York Boogie (BackBeat).

Snoop Dogg sampled "This Beat Is Mine" for a song on his 2011 Doggumentary album, called "This Weed Iz Mine".

== Chart performance ==
Year	Title	Label	Peak chart positions		
Year	Title	Label	US Dance	US R&B	UK
1981	"This Beat Is Mine"	SAM (US); Virgin (UK)	11	64	42
1982	"Mystery Lover"	SAM (US)	—	—	—
"—" denotes the release that did not chart in that territory.

== Discography ==
=== Singles ===
"This Beat Is Mine"

12" / S-12343	1. "This Beat Is Mine" – 5:53; 2. "This Beat Is Mine" (instrumental) –5:26; Label: SAM; Songwriter, producer: Andre Booth, Gary R. Turnier
