= Just How Sweet Is Your Love =

Song by Rhyze

from the album Just How Sweet Is Your Love
- A-side: "Just How Sweet Is Your Love"
- B-side: "I Found Love In You"
- Written: Paul L. Kyser/Leon Stuckey
- Released: 1980
- Label: Sam 80-5014
- Producer: Paul L. Kyser

"Just How Sweet Is Your Love" was a single for the group Rhyze. It charted on both the Billboard Hot Dance/Disco chart and on the Black Singles chart.

== Background ==
"Just How Sweet Is Your Love" was written by Paul Kyser and Leon Stuckey. It backed with "I Found a Love in You" was released on SAM 80–5014 in 1980. Produced by Paul Kyser, the record's arrangements with their simplicity, pleasant and easy-going sounds were noted by Barry Lederer in his Disco Mix column in the May 3 issue of Billboard.

It was reported by Cash Box in the August 2, 1980 issue that "Just How Sweet Is Your Love" had sold 72,000 copies for the SAM Records label.

== Airplay ==
On the week of August 2, the Black Radio Highlights section of Cash Box recorded the record moving up from 34 to 24 on the chart of Boston's WILD station.

== Charts ==
For the week ending May 10, the record was at no. 13 in Philadelphia on the Billboard's Disco Action chart. It was also had made its debut at no. 79 on the Billboard Disco Top 100 chart. Also that week, it made its debut on the Record World Disco File Top 50 chart at no. 36.

For the week of June 28 at week eight, the record reached its peak position of no. 12 on the Record World Disco File Top 50 chart and held that position for another week.

For the week of July 12, at week ten, the record peaked at no. 16 on the Billboard Disco Top 100 chart.

For the week of August 2, the record had moved up from 55 to 50 on the UK Disco chart.
