= Rhyze =

- Origin: New York City, United States
- Genres: Funk, R&B, soul
- Years active: 1980–1981
- Labels: 20th Century Records, SAM Records

Rhyze was an American R&B and funk band. They are probably best known for their song "Just How Sweet Is Your Love" which was an R&B and dance hit. Much of their output was material written by Paul Kyser and Leon Stuckey.

== Career ==
=== Nu-Sound Express ===
The group's history can be traced back to an act called Soul Unlimited. They were still at college when they met and became associated with a young Paul Kyser who was a record producer, song writer and arranger. He changed their name to The Nu-Sound Express, LTD. / Nu-Sound Express. They released 2 singles and had a degree of success playing the New York, New Jersey and Pennsylvania music venues. Later they changed their name to Rhyze.

=== Rhyze ===
The group consisted of Roscoe Taylor (lead vocals, trumpet), Elisworth "EI-T" Anderson (bass, lead vocals), Vince Jackson (guitar, lead vocals), Charles Holmes (drums), Joseph "Jo Jo" McKnight (congas, percussion), Kevin Barbee (keyboards), Richard Menter (trumpet) and Kenneth Hicks (sax). Rhyze was nominated for Best New Artist Grammy Award in 1981. They were also nominated for a Grammy Award for Best R&B Performance by a Duo or Group with Vocals. The band split up around the same year.

The band was mostly influenced by funk, disco and soul. Their album, Just How Sweet Is Your Love was reviewed in the July 19, 1979 issue of Record World. The review though brief indicated that it had a wide appeal. Also that week, the record having spent eleven weeks in the Record World Disco File chart had dropped five places from 16 to 21.

"Just How Sweet Is Your Love" which entered two Billboard charts in 1980. It reached number 16 on Hot Dance/Disco chart and number 92 on Black Singles chart.

In 1981, the group had one Grammy nominations. It was for their Paul Kyser produced song, "Rhyze To The Top" in the Grammy Award for Best R&B Performance by a Duo or Group with Vocals category.

=== Later years ===
In 2011, their devotional album God Is On Call was released.

== Band members ==
- Roscoe Taylor – lead vocals, trumpet
- Ellsworth 'EI-T' Anderson – bass, lead vocals
- Vince Jackson – guitar, lead vocals
- Charles Holmes – drums
- Joseph "Jo Jo" McKnight – congas, percussion
- Kevin Barbee – keyboards
- Richard Menter – trumpet
- Kenneth Hicks – sax

== Discography ==
=== Studio albums ===
Year	Album	Release	Format	US	UK
1980	Just How Sweet Is Your Love	SAM Records LP 703	LP	—	—
1981	Rhyze to the Top	20th Century Fox Records T-639	LP	—	—
2006	Rhyze to the Top	Essential Media Group LLC 894231506826	CD	—	—
2011	God Is on Call	GAME 52685	CD	—	—
"—" denotes an album that did not chart or was not released in that region.

=== Singles ===
Year	Song	U.S.	U.S. R&B	U.S. Dance	Album
1980	"Free / Singing and Dancing"	—	—	—	Just How Sweet Is Your Love
1980	"Just How Sweet Is Your Love" / "I Found Love in You"^{1}	—	#92	#16	Just How Sweet Is Your Love
1981	"Rhyze to the Top"	—	—	—	Rhyze to the Top
1981	"Tonight's Gonna Be My Night"	—	—	—	Rhyze to the Top
1981	"Tonight's Gonna Be My Night / What Can I Do About This Feeling"	—	—	—	Rhyze to the Top
"—" denotes a single that did not chart or was not released in that region.

- ^{1} A-side only charted.

== See also ==
- Funk
- SAM Records
- Prelude Records
- Salsoul Records
