= Dance-rock =

Genre of rock music

- Stylistic origins: Post-disco; disco; pop rock; rock; new wave; post-punk; rhythm and blues
- Cultural origins: Late 1970s – early 1980s
- Typical instruments: Keyboard; bass guitar; electric guitar; drum machine; drums; synthesizer; electronic drums; sampler; sequencer; vocals; vocoder; talkbox
- Derivative forms: Alternative dance; grebo; Minneapolis sound

Other topics
- List of artists; dance-punk; electronic rock; Neue Deutsche Härte

Dance-rock is a dance-infused genre of rock music. It is a post-disco genre connected with pop rock and new wave with fewer rhythm and blues influences. It originated in the early 1980s, following the decline in popularity of both punk and disco.

== Definitions ==
Michael Campbell, in his book Popular Music in America, defines the genre as "post-punk/post-disco fusion". Campbell also cited Robert Christgau, who described dance-oriented rock (or DOR) as an umbrella term used by various DJs in the 1980s.

However, AllMusic defines "dance-rock" as 1980s and 1990s music practiced by rock musicians, influenced by Philly soul, disco and funk, fusing those styles with rock and dance. Artists like the Rolling Stones, David Bowie, Duran Duran, Simple Minds, INXS, Eurythmics, Depeche Mode, the Clash, New Order and Devo belong, according to AllMusic, to this genre. Dance-rock embraces some experimental funk acts like A Certain Ratio, Gang of Four, and also mainstream musicians, for example Robert Palmer, Billy Idol and Hall & Oates.

== History ==
Despite predictions that rock music would replace disco in the dance clubs, a mix of post-disco, new wave and post-punk took its place instead. The first wave of artists arrived with New Order, Prince, the Human League, Blondie, Tom Tom Club (consisting of two members from Talking Heads) and Devo, followed by Daryl Hall & John Oates, Thompson Twins, Haircut 100, ABC, Depeche Mode and Spandau Ballet. The scene also produced many crossovers, including Kraftwerk getting R&B audiences with their 1981 influential album Computer World, which paved the way for Afrika Bambaataa's "Planet Rock" and electro in general. Reinstated interest in dance-rock and post-disco caused popularity of 12-inch singles and EPs around that era.

Key influences of the genre include New Romantic, synth-pop acts Human League and Spandau Ballet while, according to Billboard, the pivotal record of the genre is Human League's "Don't You Want Me".

Arthur Baker argued that synthesizers helped to shape the new music: "I'm into synthesizers right now. The options are limitless. It cuts costs and gives you more ultimate control, but it doesn't sound made up. It still has a human feel", while the sound, composed of electronic Eurodisco influences, was generally regarded as "cold, anti-human and mechanical."

== Legacy ==
This kind of dance-rock influenced such alternative rock acts as Garbage, No Doubt, Robbie Williams, Scissor Sisters, Young Love, Franz Ferdinand, Arctic Monkeys, Kasabian and the Killers.

== See also ==
- List of dance-rock artists
- Alternative dance
- Electronic rock
- Dance-punk
- Electropunk
- New wave music
- Disco music
