= Soulsearcher =

English record producer

Soulsearcher was a studio project based in England, created by record producer Marc Pomeroy.

== Biography ==
In 1999, Pomeroy scored a No. 8 hit on the UK Singles Chart and a No. 20 Billboard Hot Dance/Club Play hit with "Can't Get Enough", featuring American singer-songwriter Thea Austin on vocals. The track was co-written by Austin and sampled the No. 1 Dance hit from 1979, "Let's Lovedance Tonight" by Gary's Gang. The track later featured in Grand Theft Auto: The Ballad of Gay Tony on the fictional in-game radio station Vladivostok FM.

They also released a single in 1999 titled "Do It to Me Again", which reached No. 32 on the UK Singles Chart.

In 2003, Soulsearcher returned to the club charts with "Feelin' Love", featuring vocals from Donna Allen.

== Discography ==
=== Singles ===
List of singles, with selected chart positions
Title	Year	Peak chart positions							
Title	Year	UK	AUS	BEL (FL)	FRA	GER	NLD	NZ	US Dance
"Can't Get Enough"	1999	8	36	49	66	84	46	43	20
"Do It to Me Again"	1999	32	—	—	—	—	—	—	—
"Feelin' Love" (featuring Donna Allen)	2003	—	—	—	—	—	—	—	—
