= Come to Me (France Joli song) =

Single by France Joli

from the album France Joli
- B-side: "Let Go"
- Released: 1979
- Recorded: 1979
- Genre: Disco
- Length: 9:34; 4:12 (single edit)
- Label: Prelude
- Songwriter: Tony Green
- Producer: Tony Green

France Joli singles chronology
"This Time (I'm Giving All I've Got)" (1979)	"Come to Me" (1979)	"Heart to Break the Heart" (1980)

"Come to Me" is a No. 1 disco hit from 1979 performed by France Joli, who had recorded it at the age of fifteen with producer, Tony Green, who composed the song and briefly sings on it. The track also features the famed Philadelphia session vocalists, The Sweethearts of Sigma Sound. The song was introduced on the 1979 album France Joli, which was released in the US on 17 April 1979 on Prelude, and rose to No. 26. "Come to Me" received a major boost on 7 July when Joli performed it as a last-minute replacement for Donna Summer at a Fire Island concert known as Beach ’79, which was attended by 5,000 gay men. "Come to Me" began a three-week reign atop the Billboard Hot Dance Club Play chart on 22 September 1979. "Come to Me" peaked at No. 15 on the Billboard Hot 100 the week of November 17, 1979 and at No. 36 on the R&B chart.
