= Sharon Redd =

American singer (1945–1992)

- Redd in 1988

Background information
- Born: October 19, 1945; Norfolk, Virginia, U.S.
- Origin: New York City, U.S.
- Died: May 1, 1992 (aged 46)
- Genres: R&B; house; post-disco
- Occupations: Singer; actress
- Instrument: Vocals
- Years active: 1967–1992
- Labels: United Artists; Prelude
- Formerly of: The Harlettes

Sharon Redd (October 19, 1945 – May 1, 1992) was an American singer from New York City. She was the half sister of Snap! singer Penny Ford.

== Life and career ==
Redd was born on October 19, 1945, in Norfolk, Virginia, to Gene and Katherine Redd. Gene Redd was a producer and musical director at King Records, and her stepfather performed with Benny Goodman's orchestra. Her brother Gene Redd Jr. was a songwriter and producer for Kool & the Gang and the band BMP. Her half-sister Penny Ford is also a singer with two solo albums to her credit and known for her work as the main singer for Snap!, Soul II Soul, and the S.O.S. Band.

She began her recording career with four singles in 1968 for the United Artists label, three written and all four produced by songwriter and record producer Bobby Susser. Susser chose the Hank Williams song "Half as Much" to be Redd's first single. Redd's vocals, against Susser's heavy-bass track, made her presence very quickly known to R&B radio stations. Redd, as a budding actress, got a major break when she starred in an Australian production of the rock musical Hair. She was among a troupe of young African American imports to the Sydney production, a group which notably included Marcia Hines. Redd appeared in the production from its June 6, 1969, premiere through 1971.

As Redd was becoming famous in Australia, she was interviewed by Barry Sloane on a 1971 episode of GTK. Her popular adverts for Amoco led to her own television special. Redd and Hair co-star Teddy Williams were asked to leave Australia by the Immigration Department in April 1971 for reasons they believed were race-motivated. Aside from Hair, Redd also appeared in Ti-Jean and His Brothers and, in 1974, traveled to London to star in an American production of The Wedding of Iphigenia. In 1977 Redd played the role of Sherrye in the U.S. sitcom television series Rhoda. 1978 also saw Redd feature as a guest in the musical Sgt. Pepper's Lonely Hearts Club Band.

In the mid-1970s, Bette Midler was looking to replace Merle Miller and Gail Kantor, both of whom had left after Midler's 1973 tour to pursue their own interests. Midler auditioned over 70 performers, but Redd landed the job, becoming one of Bette's Harlettes. Aside from performing as a Harlette, Redd also provided backing vocals for Carol Douglas ("Burnin'" and "Night Fever") and Norman Connors ("You Are My Starship"). Having ended their association with Midler, Redd, Charlotte Crossley, & Ula Hedwig released an LP, Formerly of the Harlettes, in late 1977. In 1978, RCA Victor released "Love Insurance" on a 12-inch disco as Front Page with Sharon Redd. She was credited on that version.

In 1979, Redd recorded the disco hit "Love Insurance", released by Panorama Records under the name Front Page, her own vocals going uncredited. But she soon signed a recording contract with Prelude Records, and Redd became the label's most successful artist. Her debut studio album, 1980's self-titled Sharon Redd, was closely followed by two more: Redd Hott (1982) and Love How You Feel (1983). Redd had several charting songs on the Billboard Hot Dance Club Play chart, including "Beat the Street", "In the Name of Love" and "Love How You Feel".

After these releases, Redd returned to her successful career as a backing vocalist, most notably with the group Soirée, which also included among its members Luther Vandross and Jocelyn Brown.

In early 1992, she had a UK top 20 hit with a re-recorded version of "Can You Handle It", with "Tom's Diner" remixers DNA and appeared with the duo, singing live vocals, on BBC One's Top of the Pops on January 30. Following the success of this new version of "Can You Handle It", she recorded a single entitled "All the Way to Love", with L.A. Mix's Les Adams. This was to be her last solo recording and remains unreleased.

In the midst of mounting a comeback in the early 1990s, Redd died of pneumonia on May 1, 1992. Dance Music Report magazine reported that her death was AIDS-related. The virus had weakened her immune system, which had become ineffective following the singer stepping on broken glass on stage.

In 1993, Redd's vocals featured on the duet track "Under Pressure", as found on her half-sister Penny Ford's self-titled album.

== Legacy ==
Despite not being as recognized as other stars, Redd was able to establish herself as a Diva on the disco scene in the late 70s and early 80s. Redd was honored by the National AIDS Memorial, in an online exhibit to commemorate Black History Month along with other celebrities like Sylvester and Arthur Ashe. In 2011, Redd was posthumously honored at the 2011 Divas Simply Singing music benefit. Her name was among the number of celebrities featured on a special made red quilt displayed during the event.

== Discography ==
=== Albums ===
Year	Album	Label	Format	Peak chart positions	
Year	Album	Label	Format	US Dance	UK
1980	Sharon Redd	Prelude	LP, CD	―	―
1982	Redd Hott	Prelude	LP, CD	1	59
1983	Love How You Feel	Prelude	LP, CD	―	―
"—" denotes releases that did not chart.

=== Compilations ===
- The Classic Redd (Prelude, 1985)
- Beat the Street: The Best of Sharon Redd (Unidisc, 1989)
- The Complete Sharon Redd on Prelude 1980–1985 (Karamel, 1990)
- Essential Dancefloor Artists Vol. 3: Sharon Redd (Deepbeats, 1994)

=== Singles ===
Year	Single	Peak chart positions					
Year	Single	US Dance	US R&B	AUS	UK	NL	NZ
1967	"Half as Much"	―	―	―	―	―	―
1968	"I've Got a Feeling"	―	―	―	―	―	―
1969	"Easy to Be Hard"	―	―	32	―	―	―
1980	"Can You Handle It"	5	57	―	31	―	―
1980	"Love Is Gonna Get Ya"	―	―	―	―	―	―
1981	"You Got My Love"	―	―	―	―	―	―
1982	"Never Give You Up" ‡	1	―	―	20	―	―
1982	"Beat the Street" ‡	1	41	―	―	―	―
1982	"In the Name of Love" ‡	1	―	―	31	11	―
1982	"Takin' a Chance on Love" ‡	1	―	―	91	―	―
1983	"Love How You Feel"	16	―	―	39	―	―
1983	"You're a Winner"	―	―	―	83	―	―
1983	"Liar on the Wire"	33	―	―	―	―	―
1985	"Undercover Girl"	―	―	―	―	―	―
1988	"Second to None"	―	―	―	―	―	―
1992	"Can You Handle It" (DNA's re-recording)	―	―	―	17	62	41
"—" denotes releases that did not chart or were not released in that territory.

‡ Denotes tracks from US Dance-charting LP Redd Hot which included all cuts.

== See also ==
- List of Billboard number-one dance club songs
- List of artists who reached number one on the U.S. Dance Club Songs chart
