= Gary's Gang =

American R&B/pop rock group

- Origin: Queens, New York, U.S.
- Genres: Rock, disco, pop
- Years active: 1977–1985
- Labels: SAM/Columbia; Radar
- Past members: Gary Turnier; Eric Matthew; Bob Forman; Jay Leon; Al Lauricella; Bill Catalano

Gary's Gang was an American R&B/pop rock group best known for the U.S. hit "Keep on Dancin'", which reached #41 on the Billboard Hot 100 in 1978. The song also climbed to #8 in the UK Singles Chart, #14 on the Hot Soul Singles chart in 1978 and also made #1 on the Hot Dance Club Play chart, as did two of the group's other songs, "Do It at the Disco" and "Let's Lovedance Tonight". The latter was later used as the sampling background track to Soulsearcher's 1999 #20 Dance Club Play hit, "Can't Get Enough".

== Overview ==
The group, based in Queens, New York, consisted of Gary Turnier, Eric Matthew a.k.a. Joseph Tucci, Al Lauricella, Rino Minetti, Bill Catalano, Bob Forman and Jay Leon.

In the 1980s, Gary's Gang enjoyed further U.S. and European success with the 1982 single "Knock Me Out" (#45 UK) and the 1983 hit "Makin' Music", which reached #8 on the Hot Dance Club Play chart. Brian Chin of Billboard described "Knock Me Out" as "midtempoed and very pop, it shares much of the soft-edged production styling and doowoppish vocals of the group's earlier work".

== Discography ==
=== Albums ===
Year	Album	Label	Peak chart positions	
Year	Album	Label	US	US R&B
1979	Keep On Dancin'	Columbia	42	27
1979	Gangbusters	Columbia	—	—
"—" denotes releases that did not chart.

=== Singles ===
Year	Song	Peak chart positions			
Year	Song	US Dance	US R&B	US Pop	UK
1978	"Keep On Dancin' / Do It at the Disco"	1	15	41	8
1979	"Do Ya' Wanna Go Dancin'"	54	—	―	―
1979	"Showtime / Rock Around the Clock"	―	―	―	―
1979	"Let's Lovedance Tonight"	1	—	―	49
1979	"Spirits"	—	—	―	—
1982	"Knock Me Out"	25	—	―	45
1983	"Makin' Music"	8	—	—	94
1984	"Runaway"	―	—	—	―
1990	"Keep On Dancin' 1990"	―	—	―	98
"—" denotes releases that did not chart.

== See also ==
- List of Billboard number-one dance club songs
- List of artists who reached number one on the U.S. Dance Club Songs chart
