= Tracy Weber (singer) =

American singer

- Origin: New York City, New York, U.S.
- Died: 1981
- Occupation: Singer

Tracy Weber (died 1981) was an American singer, best known for her dance hit "Sure Shot", released in late 1981 after her death. Nicky Braddy and Richard Bassoff co-wrote the song for Weber to sing, as Braddy and Weber had known each other growing up in Queens.

"Sure Shot" was produced as a 12-inch disco single by Eric Matthew and Gary Turnier, but shortly before the single was released, Weber was shot and killed in an apartment in Harlem, New York City. The song reached number 3 on the Billboard Disco Top 60 chart in February 1982. "Sure Shot" was popular in dance clubs, listed in San Francisco as one of the top 25 dance club records of 1981–1982, and played by Larry Levan in New York City who released his own dance mix of the song. In France, Le Figaro praised "Sure Shot" as a summer dance hit and said Weber was a charming young lady with a "voice of fire".

== Discography ==
=== Singles ===
Release year	Song	Label	Chart positions		Notes
Release year	Song	Label	U.S. Dance	U.S. R&B	Notes
1981	"Sure Shot"	Quality Records Of America	3	–	Produced by Matthew/Turnier
1983	"One Step At A Time"	Quality Records Of America	–	–	Produced by Matthew/Turnier
—	"You Ought To Know"	—	–	–	Unreleased
