= Sinnamon =

American female R&B vocal trio

- Origin: Hartford, Connecticut; New York City, New York
- Genres: Contemporary R&B, post-disco
- Years active: 1982–1994
- Labels: Becket
- Past members: Barbara Fowler; Marsha Carter; Melissa Bell

Sinnamon was an American female R&B vocal trio, consisting of Connecticut natives Barbara Fowler, Marsha Carter, and Melissa Bell from New York City. The group went through an abrupt development from a minimalist contemporary R&B sound of post-disco which was dropped after a third release, moving towards mild freestyle and radio-friendly house music but still preserving their R&B affiliation. Bell is currently a writer, living in New York City.

== History ==
Their greatest success occurred in 1982 when their song "Thanks to You" spent two weeks at number one on the US Hot Dance Music/Club Play chart in Billboard. The song also reached number 44 on the US Billboard R&B chart. Their song "I Need You Now" features uncredited guest vocals by Bernard Fowler from the Peech Boys.

== Discography ==
=== Singles ===
Year	Single	Label	Peak chart positions	
Year	Single	Label	US R&B	US Dance
1982	"He's Gonna Take You Home"	Becket	―	―
1982	"Thanks to You"	Becket	44	1
1983	"I Need You Now"	Jive	―	―
1984	"Thin Line"	Power House	―	―
1986	"Say It Again"	Spring	―	―
1987	"Send It C.O.D."	New Image	―	―
"—" denotes releases that did not chart.

== See also ==
- List of number-one dance hits (United States)
- List of artists who reached number one on the US Dance chart
