= SAM Records =

American independent record company

- Parent company: Win Records, Inc.
- Founded: 1976
- Founder: Sam Weiss
- Status: defunct
- Distributors: self-distributed (except 1978–1979); Columbia (1978–1979)
- Genre: Pop, disco, post-disco, R&B/soul, garage house
- Country of origin: U.S.
- Location: New York City

SAM Records was a New York-based independent record company active between 1977–1983 and 1989–1991. The label was operated by Sam Weiss and Daniel Glass, who worked as a vice president.

In the late 1970s, Columbia, as a CBS subsidiary, had a distribution deal with SAM for about 18 months. The most successful artists of SAM include John Davis and the Monster Orchestra, Glen Adams Affair, Gary's Gang and Komiko.

== History ==
=== Founder's biography ===
SAM Records was founded in 1976 by Sam Weiss. He was born on September 19, 1926, in Romania and together with his brother Hy Weiss he became involved in record label business throughout the 1950s; the highlight of doo-wop and rhythm and blues music.

Somewhere around the year 1950, Weiss was accused of plagiarism over the parts of his song called "Sam's Song" he presumably copied from Elmer Albrecht's "Elmer's Tune".

In the 1990s, Weiss helped his son, Mike Weiss, to found Nervous Records. SAM Records catalog was later brought into Nervous Records.

=== Description ===
In the late 1970s, Weiss jumped on the disco bandwagon therefore SAM Records was born. Weiss hired his son-in-law Daniel Glass to run the label with him. Glass later joined EMI Music and for record companies like Chrysalis Records and EMI Records.

As of November 1980, the label mostly included dance music artists of different popular formats such as disco, R&B and even reggae.

Sam Records was technically a division of Win Records, Inc. which was headed by Sam Weiss.

=== Moderate success ===
During the late 1970s, SAM Records artists enjoyed some success especially on Billboard Disco charts. Artists that crossed over to different charts mostly include boogie/dance compositions like "Don't Let Go of Me" (1982, Mike & Brenda Sutton) peaked at #82 R&B, "Rock Shock" (1982, B.B.C.S. & A.) peaked at #82 R&B, and "Feel Alright" (1982, Komiko) peaked at #83 R&B.

== Selected discography ==
Year	Catalog	Song	Artist	Notes
1975	S-102	"Woman Of The Ghetto"	Doris Duke	First single issued by SAM
1978	S-12458	"Keep On Dancin'"/"Do It At The Disco"	Gary's Gang	Debut single
1980	S-12332	"Just How Sweet Is Your Love"/"I Found Love In You"	Rhyze	—
1981	S-12342	"We'll Make It"	Mike & Brenda Sutton	—
1981	81-5021	"It's Hot"/"Hupendi Muziki Wangu?!"	K.I.D.	—
1982	82-5027	"Rock Shock"	B.B.C.S. & A.	—
1982	S-12352	"Hold On"	Kreamcicle	—
1982	S-12354	"Under The Wear"	The Webboes	—
1981	S-12339	"Wikka Wrap"	Evasions	—
1982	S-12351	"Don't Let Go Of Me"	Mike & Brenda Sutton	—
1982	S-12344	"Feel Alright"	Komiko	—
1982	VS 486-12	"This Beat Is Mine"	Vicky "D"	—
1983	S-12358	"Somebody's Loving You"	Klassique	—
