= Unidisc Music =

Canadian independent record label

Unidisc Music Inc.
- Founded: 1977; 49 years ago
- Founder: George Cucuzzella
- Distributors: Self-distributed (Quebec, Canada)
- Genre: Various
- Country of origin: Canada
- Location: Pointe-Claire, Quebec
- Official website: unidisc.com

Unidisc Music is a Canadian independent record label. The label is known for releasing rare music, that was made between the mid-1960s and late 1980s. Genres include rock, electronic, funk, soul, hip hop, jazz, reggae, Latin, disco and a cappella. Unidisc owns the 1982–1993 Sutra Records catalog, and the catalogs of other independent New York labels that the latter distributed.

== History ==
Founder George Cucuzzella began his career as a nightclub DJ, in Montreal, in the 1970s. He formed a Canadian Record Pool, supplying vinyl to other DJ's across Quebec, and paying others to produce remixes in his name. Examples are: Lady Bump by Penny MacLean, Don't Stop the Music by the Bay City Rollers, and Love to Love by Tina Charles. Through Downstairs Records, he became a dance music importer and exporter, and indie-store supplier. He started Prism Records, which began in 1977. Then in 1980-81, the company was known as Matra Records. Finally in 1982, the corporate name was permanently changed to Unidisc Records.

Unidisc acquired the recording and publishing rights of Prelude Records in New York, which included Musique's 1978 dance floor hit In the Bush. Additional tracks are by Saturday Night Band, Inner life, D Train and Unlimited Touch.

Unidisc purchased rights to Ahed Music, Beyond Music, De-Lite Records, Emergency Records, Megatone Records, Midland International Records, Network Records, Pickwick Records, Quality Records and SOLAR Records – as well as the Canadian labels Daffodil, MWC and Attic Records.

In 2008, Unidisc bought Aquarius and Tacca Musique. In 2010, the label merged with DEP Records and Universal Music Canada. Unidisc began Kookoo Records for house and electronic music, releasing music from Boston Bun, Pat Lok and Martin Alix.

== Function ==
Unidisc's main acquisition of revenue has been by selling synch rights to the songs it owns. When the rights are purchased from its catalog, the songs are incorporated into mainstream entertainment media via movies, television, animation, commercials and video games. These include Fresh Prince of Bel Air, Sex and the City, Grey's Anatomy, Bones, CSI: Miami, Dancing with the Stars, Flashdance, Fame, Studio 54, Summer of Sam, Bad Santa, Joe Dirt, Rio, Open Season, G Force, Dreyers Ice Cream, Gap, Diet Pepsi, Miller Coors and Grand Theft Auto.

Unidisc's publishing functions operate under Unitunes (ASCAP), Lovetown Music (BMI), Socan-affiliated Blue Image, Keep on Music, Star Quality Music and Prime Quality Music.

Unidisc markets through YouTube, iTunes, Facebook, MySpace and Twitter. In the 1980s, Unidisc worked with Lime, Erotic Drum Band, Gino Soccio, Nightlife Unlimited, Trans X, Freddie James and Geraldine Hunt. In the 1990s, the label acquired publishing rights to April Wine, Patrick Norman, Robert Charlebois, Babyface, T.L.C., Boyz II Men, Toni Braxton, Usher and Corey Hart.

== Select roster ==
- April Wine
- A Foot in Coldwater
- Anvil
- Carol Douglas
- D. Train
- Dynasty
- Fat Larry's Band
- Haywire
- The Hunt
- Irene Cara
- Lee Aaron
- Lime
- Moxy
- Razor
- Ronnie Hawkins
- Salsoul Orchestra
- Shalamar
- Skydiggers
- Sylvester
- The Nylons
- The Stampeders
- The Whispers
- Wednesday
- Xavion

== Sublabels ==
- Black Sun Records
- Illusion Records
- Image Records
- Karisma Records
- Matra Records
- SOLAR Records
- De-Lite Records
- Emergency Records
- Sutra Records
- Becket Records
- Sound of New York Records
- Megatone Records
- Prism Records
- Butterfly Records
- Radar Records
- Les Disques Star Records
- Sugarscoop Records
- Aquarius Records
- Attic Records
- Beyond Music
- Prelude Records
- Mirage Records

== See also ==
- List of record labels
