= Post-disco =

Music genre

- Stylistic origins: Disco; dub; electronic; hi-NRG; new wave; funk; soul; rhythm and blues
- Cultural origins: Late 1970s – early 1980s
- Derivative forms: Dance-pop; house; techno

Subgenres
- Italo disco; dance-rock; boogie; alternative dance

Other topics
- New wave; post-punk; dance-punk; new musick; mutant disco

Post-disco is a term and genre to describe an aftermath in popular music history c. 1979–1987, imprecisely beginning with the backlash against disco music in the United States, leading to civil unrest and a riot in Chicago known as the Disco Demolition Night on July 12, 1979. During its dying stage, disco displayed an increasingly electronic character that soon served as a stepping stone to new wave, old-school hip-hop, Euro disco, and was succeeded by an underground club music called hi-NRG, which was its direct continuation.

An underground movement of disco music, which was simultaneously "stripped-down" and featured "radically different sounds", took place on the East Coast that "was neither disco and neither R&B". This scene, known as post-disco, (Note: Various terms to describe the sound of what seemed to be post-disco were introduced, such as, but not limited to, "dance", "club music", "R&B", and "disco". The last, however, become an unfashionable term, hence the increasing use of "dance" vis-à-vis the word "disco".) catering to the New York metropolitan area, was initially led by urban contemporary musical artists partially in response to the perceived over-commercialization and artistic downfall of disco culture. It was developed from the rhythm and blues sound exemplified by Parliament-Funkadelic, the electronic side of disco, dub music techniques, and other genres. Post-disco was typified by New York City music groups like "D" Train and Unlimited Touch who followed a more urban approach while others, like Material and ESG, followed a more experimental one. Post-disco was, like disco, a singles-driven market controlled mostly by independent record companies that generated a cross-over chart success all through the early-to-mid 1980s. Most creative control was in the hands of record producers and club DJs which was a trend that outlived the dance-pop era.

The term post-disco is often conflated with individual styles of its era, such as boogie, synth-funk, or electro-funk. Other musical styles that emerged in the post-disco era include dance-pop and Italo disco, and the genre led to the development of the early alternative dance, club-centered house and techno music.

== Characteristics ==
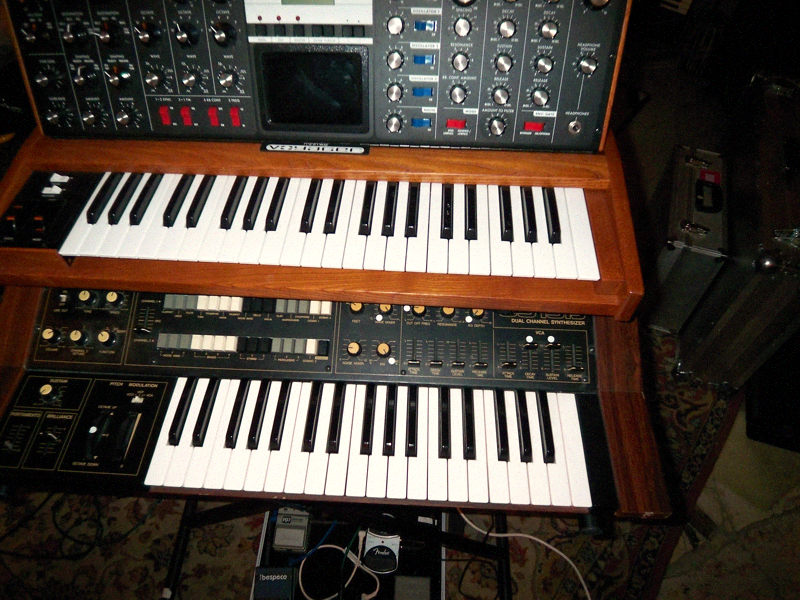
Synthesizers played a crucial part in the development of post-disco.

Drum machines, synthesizers, sequencers were either partly or entirely dominant in a composition or mixed up with various acoustic instruments, depending on the artist and on the year. Electronic instruments became more and more prevalent for each year during the period and dominated the genre completely by the mid 1980s.

Darryl Payne argued about the minimal approach of post-disco, saying:

Producers are using a lot more sounds and a lot less instruments: the "Forget Me Nots" and "Don't Make Me Wait" tracks are really empty, but there's a sophistication people can get into.

The main forces in post-disco were the 12" single format and short-lived collaborations (many of them one-hit wonders) while indie record producers were instrumental in the musical direction of what the scene was headed to. The music that mostly catered to dance and urban audiences later managed to influence more popular and mainstream acts like Madonna, New Order or Pet Shop Boys.

=== Musical elements ===
The music tended to be technology-centric, keyboard-laden, melodic, with funk-oriented bass lines (often performed on a Minimoog), synth riffs, dub music aesthetics, and background jazzy or blues-y piano layers. For strings and brass sections, synthesizer sounds were preferred to the lush orchestration heard on many disco tracks, although such arrangements would later resurface in some house music. Soulful female vocals, however, remained an essence of post-disco.

=== Term usage ===
Bridging the so-called death of disco and the birth of house, all this early-to-mid-'80s music lacks a name beyond drably functional and neutral terms like "dance" or "club music."

— Simon Reynolds, SPIN magazine

The term "post-disco" was used as early as June 1979, predating Disco Demolition Night, when an Associated Press editor deployed the term in a headline to describe the band Foxy; drummer Joe Galdo opined that disco music was evolving and that the band's sound was moving away from a traditional disco sound toward one of "soulful pop". In 1984, Cadence magazine defined post-disco soul as "disco without the loud bass-drum thump." New York Magazine used the word in an article appearing in the December 1985 issue; it was Gregory Hines's introduction of post-disco and electronic funk to Russian-American dance choreographer Mikhail Baryshnikov "who has never heard this kind of music". AllMusic states that the term denotes a music genre in the era between the indistinct "end" of disco music and the equally indistinct emergence of house music.

In other historical instances the term had been used in a derisive manner. Spy implicitly mocked the usage of both the terms "post-punk" and "post-disco" in their Spy's Rock Critic-o-Matic article, whereas spoofing various music reviews published by Rolling Stone, The Village Voice and Spin. Cuban-American writer Elías Miguel Muñoz in his 1989 novel Crazy Love, in a passage where musicians after moving to America discuss what their "style" may be, used the term in a satirical manner.

== History ==
=== Background events ===
==== United States ====
Midwesterners didn't want that intimidating [disco] style shoved down their throats

— Steve Dahl

Shortly after the "Disco Sucks" movement of disco bashing throughout the United States, American radio stations began to pay attention to other popular formats of music such as reggae, punk rock or new wave while top mainstream labels and record companies like Casablanca, TK Records or RSO went bankrupt. Since disco music had been on the way of [its] electronic progression, it split itself into subscenes and styles like Hi-NRG, freestyle, Italo disco and boogie. The last one is closely associated with post-disco more than any other offshoots of post-disco.

Brazilian record producer and fusion jazz pioneer Eumir Deodato, well aware of current trends in American underground music, turned around the career of funk music group Kool & the Gang by adopting and pursuing a light pop–post-disco sound that not only revitalized the band's image but also turned out to be the most successful hits in their entire career. B. B. & Q. Band (Capitol) and Change (Atlantic) acts' creator Jacques Fred Petrus, a French-Italian hi-NRG Italo disco music record producer, reflects on his decision to shift from conventional disco music to post-disco "[our] sound changed to more of a funky dance/R&B style to reflect the times." French-born songwriting duo Henri Belolo and Jacques Morali, creators of the successful Village People act, moved their former disco act Ritchie Family to RCA Victor to release their next album co-produced by funk musician Fonzi Thornton and Petrus, I'll Do My Best, which mirrors their radical musical shift. On the West Coast, especially in California, a different approach lead to a different sound. Dick Griffey and Leon Sylvers III of SOLAR Records, who pioneered their own signature sound, produced Ohio-based group Lakeside's album Rough Riders which already displayed these new trends and, "instrumentally demonstrates economic arrangements (featuring brass, keyboards and guitar)," as noted by Billboard, praising the album. A watershed album of post-disco was Michael Jackson's Off The Wall, produced by Quincy Jones, which helped establish a direction of R&B/dance music and influenced many young producers who were interested in this kind of new music.

Other examples of early American artists drawing from post-disco are Rick James, Change and Teena Marie.

==== Europe ====
Disco in Europe remained relatively untouched by the events in the U.S., decreasing only in Britain, but this was mostly because of the emergence of the new wave and new romantic movements around 1981, and continued to flourish within the Italo disco scene although the interest for electronic music in general was indeed growing.

==== United Kingdom ====
Unlike in the United States, where anti-disco backlash generated prominent effect on general perception of disco music, in Britain, the new wave movement initially drew heavily from disco music (although this association would be airbrushed out by the end of 1979) and took many elements from American post-disco and other genres, thus creating a characteristic scene. According to Billboard, American post-disco was merely a crossover of different genres, while focusing on the electronic and R&B overtones, whereas jazz-funk was a crucial element of the British post-disco scene that generated musicians like Chaz Jankel, Central Line or Imagination.

=== 1980s: Golden age ===
This section summary shows 1980s commercially successful records from the post-disco movement.

Compare "Jungle Boogie" (1974) with "Get Down on It" (1981) by Kool & the Gang; "Boogie Wonderland" (1979) with "Let's Groove" (1981) by Earth, Wind & Fire; "Shame" (1978) with "Love Come Down" (1982) by Evelyn "Champagne" King; "(Shake, Shake, Shake) Shake Your Booty" (1976) with "Give It Up" (1982) by KC & the Sunshine Band; and "Machine Gun" (1974) with "Lady (You Bring Me Up)" by Commodores (1981).

Hits of the golden age of post-disco
| Year | Song | Label | Artist | U.S. Dance | U.S. R&B | U.S. Pop | U.S. M.R. | U.K. Pop |
|---|---|---|---|---|---|---|---|---|
| 1979 | "I Wanna Be Your Lover" | Warner Bros. | Prince | #2 | #1 | #11 | ― | #41 |
| 1979 | "And the Beat Goes On" | SOLAR Records | The Whispers | #1 | #1 | #19 | ― | #2 |
| 1980 | "Celebration" | De-Lite | Kool & the Gang | #1 | #1 | #1 ('81) | ― | #7 |
| 1980 | "He's So Shy" | Planet | The Pointer Sisters | #26 | #10 | #3 | ― | ― |
| 1981 | "Let's Groove" | Columbia | Earth, Wind & Fire | #3 | #1 | #3 | ― | #3 |
| 1981 | "Get Down on It" | De-Lite | Kool & the Gang | ― | #4 | #10 | ― | #3 |
| 1981 | "Pull Up to the Bumper" | Island Records | Grace Jones | #2 | #5 | ― | ― | #12 |
| 1982 | "Everybody" | Sire, Warner Bros. | Madonna | #3 | ― | #107 | ― | ― |
| 1982 | "Forget Me Nots" | Elektra Records | Patrice Rushen | #2 | #4 | #23 | ― | #8 |
| 1982 | "Last Night a DJ Saved My Life" | Sound of New York | Indeep | #2 | #10 | #101 | ― | #13 |
| 1982 | "Love Come Down" | RCA | Evelyn King | #1 | #1 | #17 | ― | #7 |
| 1982 | "Do I Do" | Tamla | Stevie Wonder | #1 | #2 | #13 | ― | #10 |
| 1983 | "Holiday" | Sire, Warner Bros. | Madonna | #1 | #25 | #16 | ― | #2 |
| 1983 | "Give It Up" | Meca | KC | ― | ― | #18 | ― | #1 |
| 1983 | "Billie Jean" | Epic | Michael Jackson | #1 | #1 | #1 | ― | #1 |
| 1984 | "Caribbean Queen" | Jive | Billy Ocean | #1 | #1 | #1 | ― | #6 |
| 1984 | "Let's Dance" | EMI | David Bowie | #1 | #14 | #1 | #6 | #1 |
| 1984 | "Cool It Now" | MCA | New Edition | ― | #1 | #4 | ― | #43 |
| 1984 | "Dr. Beat" | Epic | Miami Sound Machine | #17 | ― | ― | ― | #6 |
| 1984 | "I'm So Excited" | Planet | The Pointer Sisters | #28 | #46 | #9 | ― | #11 |
| 1985 | "Into the Groove" | Sire, Warner Bros. | Madonna | #1 | #19 | ― | ― | #1 |
| 1985 | "Chain Reaction" | RCA Records | Diana Ross | #7 | #85 | #66 | ― | #1 |
| 1985 | "Object of My Desire" | Elektra | Starpoint | #12 | #8 | #25 | ― | #96 |
| 1986 | "Rumors" | Jay | Timex Social Club | #1 | #1 | #8 | ― | #13 |
| 1986 | "Ain't Nothin' Goin' on But the Rent" | Polydor Records | Gwen Guthrie | #1 | #1 | #42 | ― | #5 |
| 1987 | "Rhythm Is Gonna Get You" | Epic | Miami Sound Machine | #27 | ― | #5 | ― | #16 |

=== 2000s: Post-disco revival ===
During the late 1990s and throughout the 2000s, electronic and, especially, house musicians were influenced by post-disco. Some of these musicians are: Daft Punk, a French house music group, adopted elements of post-disco, disco and synth-pop into Discovery. Another artist, Les Rythmes Digitales, released a post-disco/electro-influenced album, Darkdancer. Canadian music group Chromeo debuted in 2004 with the album She's in Control. Similar Los Angeles-based musician Dâm-Funk recorded Toeachizown, a boogie- and electro-influenced album released in 2009. Another band called Escort, who hails from New York City, surfaced on the post-disco and post-punk revival scenes around 2006. The story about Escort appeared on New York Times in November 2011. Sampling disco and post-disco songs became a distinctive feature of R&B music at the turn of the century. Artists such as Mariah Carey and Janet Jackson incorporated strong post-disco elements in their work, with post-disco-influenced songs such as Heartbreaker, Honey, Fantasy and All For You peaking at #1 on the Billboard Hot 100.

Contemporary compilation albums featuring post-disco and electro artists (e.g. Imagination, Level 42, Afrika Bambaataa) include The Perfect Beats series (volume 1–4). Another compilation series are Nighttime Lovers (volume 1-10) and the mixed-up album titled The Boogie Back: Post Disco Club Jams.

== Pioneers and followers ==
"Thanks To You" and "Don't Make Me Wait" came out and started the whole dub thing in disco.

— Shep Pettibone

Particular psychedelic soul artists like Sly and the Family Stone liked to push the boundaries of conventional music by employing what was to be a precursor to synthesizer, electronic organ. Multi-instrumentalist Stevie Wonder was one of the early artists venturing into the realms of analog synthesizer after being impressed by the work of T.O.N.T.O. Expanding Head Band, an influential multinational electronic music duo of sound designers. Wonder remarked, "How great it is at a time when technology and the science of music is at its highest point of evolution ... A toast to greatness, a toast to Zero Time, forever." With an increasing growth of personalized synthesizers on the market they were becoming more commercially available and easy-to-use, especially those produced by Roland Corporation. One of their first users was cutting-edge artist George Clinton and his Parliament-Funkadelic collective project. Funk rhythms, psychedelic guitars, synthetic bass-rich lines, the particularly melodic endeavor and music minimalism of P-Funk. Brooklyn Transit Express member Kashif, noted for his use of bass synthesizer during the group's tour, later went solo as a record producer and began crafting funk-influenced songs for Evelyn "Champagne" King that showed a minimalism-akin approach, the disregard of disco music arrangements, and affiliation to the method of "one-man band" previously paved through by Wonder. Other spheres of influence include the move by pioneering DJs and record producers to release alternative mixes of the same single, so-called dub mixes. DJ Larry Levan implemented elements of dub music in his productions and mixes for various post-disco artists, including his own group The Peech Boys. Musically, there was a search for out-of-mainstream music to derive new ideas from, most commonly blues, and other styles like reggae and so on, were also incorporated.

Sinnamon's "Thanks to You", D-Train's "You're the One for Me", The Peech Boys' "Don't Make Me Wait"—all these songs and its attributes and trends of post-disco later influenced a new "never-before-heard" music style which would become house music.

The new post-disco sound was flourishing among predominately New York City record companies, including West End Records, Prelude Records, Tommy Boy Records, SAM Records, and others. Most of them were independently owned and had their own distribution but some particular mainstream labels, notably RCA Records, were too, responsible for popularizing and capitalizing on the new sound.

=== Timeline ===
Although there is no exact point when post-disco started, many synthpop and electronic musicians of that time continued to enhance the raw minimalist sound, while focusing on synthesizers, and keyboard instruments. As noted by Payne, drum machines also played an important part in the urban-oriented music in general.

| # | Event |
|---|---|
| 1977– 1979 | While disco music was in its heyday, the horn and string sections were a main component of disco and pop songs. This sound is also called disco orchestration. However, some of the musicians and producers dropped the lavish sound of orchestra completely, which attributed a new direction of dance music.: Few international examples, including French music project Black Devil Disco Club, French musician Cerrone and Belgian group Telex.; Parliament-Funkadelic in the United States. They are known for heavily use of bass and "regular" synthesizers and inventing the P-Funk style. |
| 1980– 1981 | After the success of Quincy Jones-produced album Off the Wall and other semi-mainstream urban-oriented music groups like Lakeside, other disco music groups either dissolved or adapted the new sounds (e.g. The Whispers, The SOS Band, Inner Life, Earth, Wind & Fire, and Shalamar in the U.S.; Nick Straker Band, and Freeez in UK). Other musicians influenced by post-disco include Stacy Lattisaw, Kurtis Blow, and George Duke.: Music producers who were experimenting with the new sounds include: Leroy Burgess and Patrick Adams, who also worked together as The Universal Robot Band; Kashif, who produced material for Evelyn "Champagne" King (albums from I'm in Love to Get Loose) and Melba Moore.; Remixers, DJs and other personalities influential on post-disco include Nick Martinelli, Ron Hardy and Larry Levan. |
| 1982 | Golden age post-disco era, where post-disco sound entered mainstream. However most of the musicians were mostly successful on the other charts, beside Billboard Hot 100. This era also spanned experimental No Wave-oriented post-disco acts like Material, Liquid Liquid, Dinosaur L and Was (Not Was). The most significant post-disco album is Michael Jackson's Thriller, which also became the best-selling album of all time. Larry Levan and the NYC Peech Boys recorded proto-house number "Don't Make Me Wait". New bands and musicians of the era appeared, including Imagination, D. Train, Skyy, Aurra, Komiko, Vicky D, Rockers Revenge, Dayton, and Unlimited Touch.: Artists influenced by post-disco include; U.S.: Mtume, Con Funk Shun, Cameo, B. B. & Q. Band, Bar-Kays, Patrice Rushen, Cheryl Lynn, and Indeep.; UK: Central Line, Chas Jankel, and Level 42.; France & West Germany: Indochine, Téléphone, Fancy, The Twins |
| 1983– 1984 | During this era, post-disco was at its highest peak. Meanwhile, Madonna's commercially successful debut album was released, which was produced by Reggie Lucas of Mtume and Jellybean, another producers of this movement. It also began to interfere with garage house and freestyle music, thus successfully shaping post-disco into electro. This change could be also heard in breakdancing- and hip-hop–themed movies like Beat Street and Breakin'.: New and influenced musicians include Class Action, Instant Funk, The Deele, Shannon, and Up Front.; Music personalities include François Kevorkian, Arthur Baker, Shep Pettibone, John "Jellybean" Benitez, Frankie Knuckles. |
| 1985– 1987 | During this era, post-disco had been dissolved in various music fields and scenes, including: a dance-oriented pop music known as dance-pop; techno and house music.; As the post-disco reached its climax, overdubbing techniques as recorded by Peech Boys and other early-1980s artists were almost omitted by then and replaced by synthpop variants instead. The movement survived as a post-disco–freestyle crossover music that spanned Raww, Hanson & Davis, Timex Social Club, Starpoint and Miami Sound Machine. |

== Legacy ==
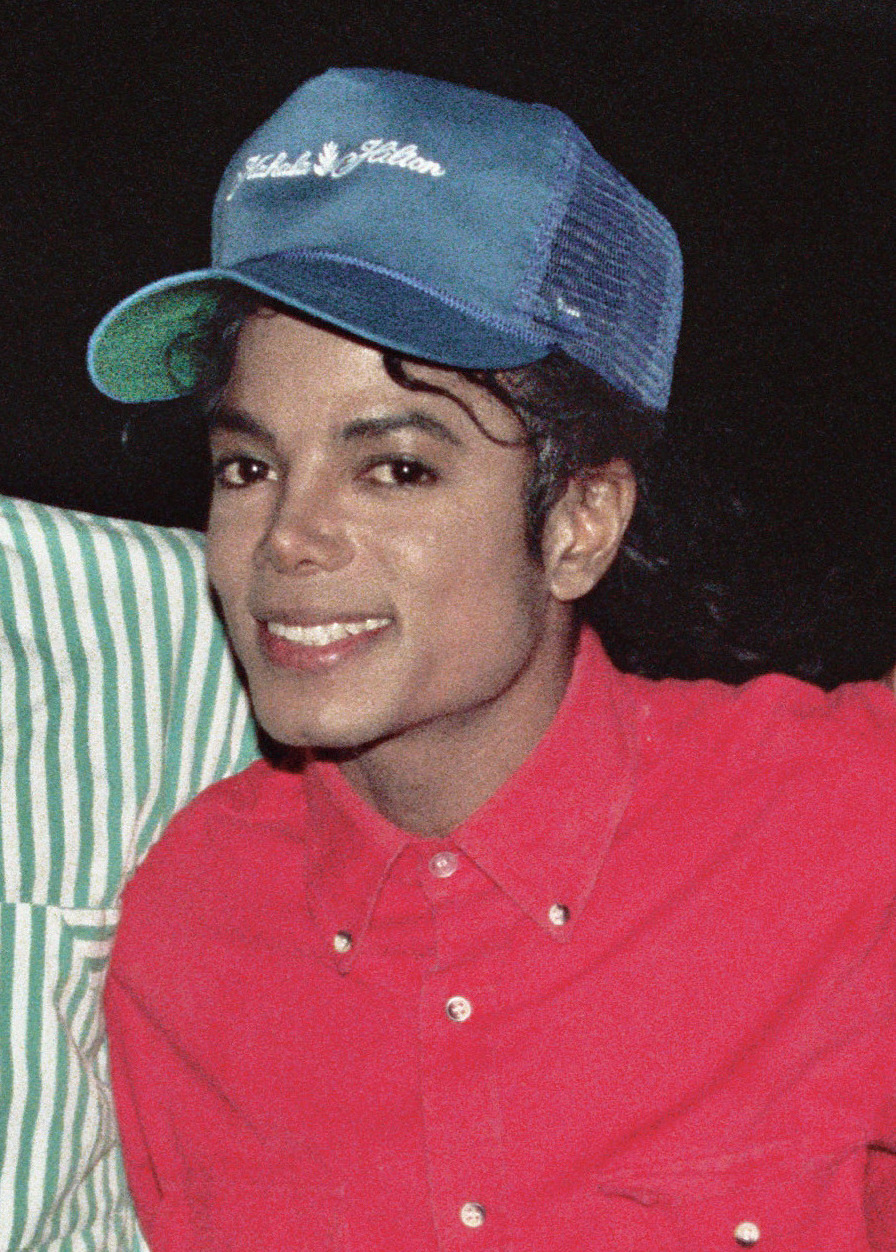
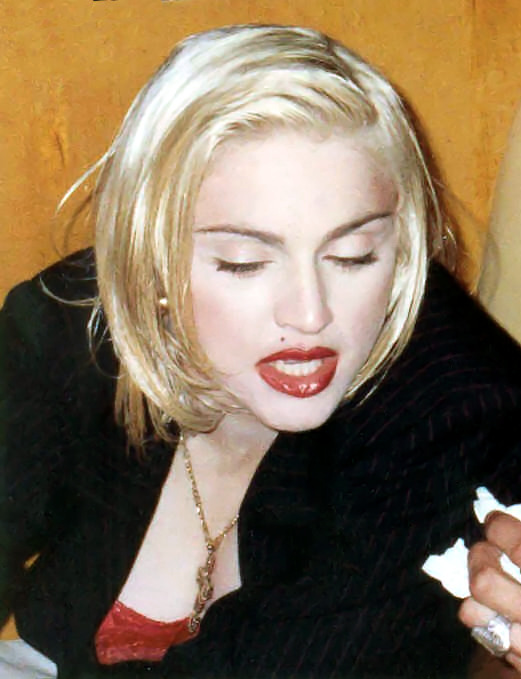
Michael Jackson and Madonna are the most successful artists of post-disco.

The 1980s post-disco sounds also inspired many Norwegian dance music producers. Some rappers such as Ice Cube or EPMD built their careers on funk-oriented post-disco music (they were inspired for example by dance-floor favorites like Zapp and Cameo). Also Sean "Puffy" Combs has been influenced by R&B-oriented post-disco music in an indirect way.

== Related genres ==
=== Boogie ===
Boogie (or electro-funk) is a post-disco subgenre with funk and new wave influences that had a minor exposure in the early to mid-1980s. Sean P. described it as "largely been ignored, or regarded as disco's poor cousin – too slow, too electronic, too R&B ... too black, even."

=== Dance-rock ===
Another post-disco movement is merely connected with post-punk/no wave genres with fewer R&B/funk influences. An example of this "post-disco" is Gina X's "No G.D.M." and artists like Liquid Liquid, Polyrock, Dinosaur L, and the Disco Not Disco (2000) compilation album. This movement also connects with dance-oriented rock; Michael Campbell, in his book Popular Music in America defines that genre as "post-punk/post-disco fusion." Campbell also cited Robert Christgau, who described dance-oriented rock (or DOR) as umbrella term used by various DJs in the 1980s.

=== Dance-pop ===
Dance-pop is a dance-oriented pop music that appeared slightly after the demise of disco and the first appearance of "stripped-down" post-disco. One of the first dance-pop songs were "Last Night a D.J. Saved My Life" by Indeep and "Love Come Down" by Evelyn "Champagne" King, whereas the latter crossed over to Billboard charts including Adult Contemporary, while peaking at number 17 on the pop chart in 1982. Another crossover post-disco song was "Juicy Fruit" by Mtume, peaking at number 45 on the Hot 100 in 1983. Same year also saw the release of Madonna's eponymous album that incorporated post-disco, urban and club sounds. British variation of dance-pop, pioneered by Stock Aitken Waterman, was more influenced by house and hi-NRG and sometimes was labeled as "eurobeat."

=== Italo disco ===
Italo disco is a disco subgenre, influenced by post-disco, hi-NRG, electronic rock, and European music. Originally music mostly played by Italian musicians, it soon made its way to Canada and United States. One of the earliest post–disco-oriented groups were Klein + M.B.O. and Kano, while New York-based Bobby Orlando was located abroad.

== Prominent record labels ==
Primary

- Salsoul Records
- Prelude Records
- West End Records
- SOLAR Records
- Total Experience Records
- Tabu Records
- Mercury Records
- Emergency Records(Shannon)
- SAM Records(Gary's Gang)

Secondary

- Sugar Hill Records
- Def Jam Records
- Enjoy Records
- Profile Records
- Tommy Boy
- Jive Records
- Cold Chillin' Records

== Compilations ==
| Released | Album | Label | Info |
|---|---|---|---|
| 2000 | VA – Disco Not Disco | Strut | compilation |
| 2002 | VA – Disco Not Disco 2 | Strut | compilation |
| 2002–2008 | VA – Opération Funk Vol. 1–5 (mixed by Kheops) | | mix album, compilation |
| 2004 | VA – Choice: A Collection of Classics (mixed by Danny Tenaglia) | Azuli | mix album, compilation |
| 2004–2009 | VA – Nighttime Lovers Vol. 1–10 | PTG | compilation |
| 2008 | VA – Disco Not Disco 3 | Strut | compilation |
| 2009 | VA – Night Dubbin' (mixed by Dimitri from Paris) | BBE | mix album, compilation |
| 2009 | VA – The Boogie Back: Post Disco Club Jams (compiled by DJ Spinna) | BBE | mix album, compilation |
| 2010 | VA – Boogie's Gonna Getcha: '80s New York Boogie | BreakBeats | compilation |

== See also ==
- List of post-disco artists
