= You're the One for Me (D Train song) =

Single by "D" Train
- Released: 1981
- Genre: Boogie
- Label: Prelude
- Songwriters: Hubert Eaves III; James Williams
- Producer: Hubert Eaves III

"D" Train singles chronology
"You're the One for Me" (1981)	"Keep On" (1982)

"You're the One For Me" is a song written by James "D. Train" Williams and Hubert Eaves III of D. Train, a New York based duo, released in 1981 by Prelude Records.

"You're the One for Me" first charted on December 19, 1981, at number 53 on the Billboard Disco Top 80 charts and became a number one hit for three weeks early in 1982.

== Production ==
James Williams and Hubert Eaves III met in college in Brooklyn, NY while Eaves was a keyboardist and music producer. The duo would later use the name "D Train", the moniker earned by Williams in high school by what he described as his "prowess on the football field". Eaves had previous work touring with musicians such as Gary Bartz in 1972 and Roberta Flack towards the late '70s. Will Downing was doing a demo on a track called "Real Deal" at Sound Lab Recording Studios. While Williams was working on the track with Downing, Eaves, who was producing a song called "Real Deal", offered him to provide vocals for a track that he was working on at his home that would become "You're the One for Me" Williams said they wrote the entire track within about an hour. "You're the One For Me" was recorded at Sound Lab Studios.

=== Radio and Club play and later mixing ===
The group presented their recording to several record labels including Columbia Records who rejected it. Williams recalled one even suggesting changing Williams vocals with a female vocalist. Before bringing it to Prelude Records, Eaves knew about the dance club called the Paradise Garage and gave the song to Larry Levan who was the club's DJ. Needs said that various dance clubs in New York would play and embodiment of disco, post-punk and hip hop music with the Paradise Garage being "the ultimate inferno", a location where Bill Brewster and Frank Broughton wrote in Last Night a DJ Saved My Life (1999) as location that "presided over the death of disco and its rebirth in a hundred forms." The Paradise Garage was known for being a regular location for gay audiences. Williams, who initially started singing in Washington Temple Church in Brooklyn, said that on going to give the song to play at Paradise was the first time he had been there. He recalled that he "learned that all people have the same needs, whether they are straight or gay. We all need love." Williams recalled that when the song was first played there and that "Everyone jumped out on that floor! They even came running out of the bathroom. The dance floor got packed!" Following the airplay at the Paradise Garage, they took the song to Frankie Crocker at WBLS-FM who played it on their radio station.

The song was mixed at Sigma Sound in New York City by Eaves and François Kevorkian. Kervorkian had started working for Prelude Records in 1978 initially doing audio mixing and A&R work for the label. He had previously established himself as what Tim Larwence described as "a hot new studio hand" after mixing Musique's "In the Bush" (1979).

It was recorded on a 16-track and what Williams then being "overdubbed the crap out of it so it sounded just like the version everyone knows." He worked alongside the Eaves to mix "You're the One for Me", with Kervorkian recalling that Eaves was "pretty clear on how he wanted the vocals to sound and how he wanted the keyboards to stick out with some reverb." Afterwards, Prelude Records released the track in 1981.

Paul Hardcastle later did a new arrangement of the song. He would remix "You're the One For Me" for RCA Records, who distributed Prelude Records releases in the United Kingdom. Hardcastle would start his own label called Total Control Records in March 1984, and release his own cover of "You're the One for Me" on the label.

== Music ==
While major record companies halting production on their release of disco records, dance music communities in New York City carried on in New York City. Kris Needs said that disco would morph into new genres, which Tim Lawrence's described in his book Life and Death on the New York Dance Floor (2016) as "one of the most creatively vibrant and socially dynamic periods in the history of New York." Music and cultural critic Nelson George wrote in his book The Death of Rhythm & Blues (1989) that for a time, all "black dance music" was described as disco.

"You're the One For Me" was first released by Prelude Records, a music label that at the time, was known for releasing disco music after a period of public backlash against the genre. Tim Lawrence author of Life and Death on the New York Dance Floor (2016) wrote that tracks by artists during this period by Taana Gardner, Inner Life, and North End created a shift dance music that he described as "grittier and tougher than anything occupied by late disco". He wrote that the music released by Prelude Records "ramped up" both the funk and R&B elements of their music. The sound was more stripped-down and the music was slower than earlier disco music, being "funky/sleazy instead of frantic" and "rawer, especially in the vocals." He said that this sound was "perhaps best captured by "D" Train".

Retrospective writing from Simon Reynolds and magazines like XLR8R have described the song as being an example of the boogie genre. Reynolds described the genre as being like disco but "slower and funkier", ranging approximately between 100 and 116 beats-per minute where synth-bass and electronic keyboards are more prominent. The magazine echoed this, describing it as mid-tempo post-disco synth funk, which was best exemplified by the early '80s releases from Prelude records. Reynolds said the genre only "achieved serious currency" in the 2000s, and that songs were not described as such on its release.

== Release ==
Follows its release in 1981, the song was played in dance club ranging ones in Japan to The Haçienda club in the United Kingdom in 1982. In The Haçienda end-of-year newsletter, they included the top 20 songs for 1982, which included "You're the One for Me" at fourth place.

After performing the song on Top of the Pops in London, England, Williams said they overhead the song playing at three different bars after the performance, stating "That's how popular the record was and that's the God's honest truth." Williams would perform the song again on the program with the group the JoBoxers. Hardcastle's new version of the song which went to number 15 in the United Kingdom in 1985. This song charted leading to a third appearance on the show, with Williams performing the song along with Hardcastle.

== Reception ==
Nelson George said that combined with the cultural and commercial backlash against what was perceived as disco led to a lack of crossover appeal to pop charts for black artists and revealed "how powerful a force semantics can be in the reception of pop music."

=== Charts ===
"You're the One for Me" first charted on December 19, 1981, at number 53 on the Billboard Disco Top 80 chart. The song was number one for three consecutive weeks from January 30 to February 13, 1982. By April it still remained on the charts.

In the United Kingdom, the single was released by Epic Records and first charted on February 6, 1982. It charted for 8 weeks, peaking at number 30. A remixed version of the track also charted in 1985 in the United Kingdom released by Prelude Records. It entered the charts on July 27, 1985. It charted for 11 weeks and peaked at number 15.

Paul Hardcastle's single version released on Total Control Records entered the UK charts on April 7, 1984, for four weeks and peaked at 41.

=== Critical reception ===
In contemporary reviews, two reviews in the NME dismissed "You're the One For Me". First, with Penny Reel of NME described it as "standard dance floor fodder" that was only distinguished by "some inventive vibraphone passes and throaty vocals." Gavin Martin later reviewed it for the publication, describing it as inexplicably being a top disco seller that was "numbingly ordinary and predictable." Other reviews were more positive, with Richard Grabel of NME later found both "You're The One for Me" and Secret Weapon's "Must Be the Music" as examples of how the "street-funk left wing is forcing the disco mainstream to toughen up, get funkier and harder and more beat oriented." He found "Must Be the Music" to be superior, but highlighted that D-Train's synthesizer riff would "hook you in" and the vocals were "big, loud and bold, keeps you there." Milo Miles of The Boston Phoenix gave the single a four out of four star rating, saying that it "zooms through the junction so loudly that only a truly iron-pumping band could sing above it."

From retrospective reviews, Nelson George wrote in his book The Death of Rhythm and Blues (1989) that in the eighties, song writing in the 1980s "went right down the toilet as the balance between riff and melody went awry." He found that new technologies such as synthesizers did not make the music better. George wrote that "D" Train's "You're the One for Me" alongside "Love Come Down" by Evelyn King as being the rare exceptions to the keyboard-based production of the R&B music of the era that had "words of lyrical and melodic interest" as several other songs had "the personality and warmth of a microwave."

Daryl Easlea from BBC wrote, "their mixture of electronics and emotion led to some compelling moments, most notably their calling card and most enduring anthem, "You're the One for Me". With its sequenced handclaps, thundering synth bass and its fluttery, repetitive electronic melody, the song is enlivened by Williams' throaty delivery." He also notes on the gospel touch of Williams' singing, "[w]hen he sings the repeated refrain of 'With the love I have inside of me, we could turn this world around,' over the breakdown, it is like the world's most charismatic preacher encapsulating the remarkable purity and longing of the first flush of true love." James Arena, in his book Legends of Disco (2016) wrote that "You're the One for Me" "helped move disco out of its overkill-induced slump into a new dimension of funky energy." Needs writing in Record Collector said the song "splintered the disco door on both sides of the Atlantic with the sleek inner-city momentum.", specifically finding Kervorkian's 12" remix made the song into "pure dancefloor demolition."

== Aftermath and influence ==
Following "You're the One for Me", D-Train would release further singles in 1983 such as "Keep On" and "Walk On By". Two versions of "You're the One For Me" appear on the duo's debut album in 1982, the first being the vocal version and the second being an instrumental. By the mid-1980s, Eaves ended his musical partnership with Williams. As of 2016, the recordings D-Train made for Prelude were owned by the Canadian music label Unidisc who acquired the tracks in the 1990s.

Berlin-based DJ Amir Abudllah said that the gritty soulful vocals are infectious and that culturally the song was "important and significant in the Black community as Stevie Wonder's version of "Happy Birthday". British DJ Greg Wilson suggested that "You're the One for Me" would set the tone for music that would come later such as "Feels Good" by Electra, "On A Journey (I Sing the Funk Electric)" by Electrik Funk and "Thanks to You" by Sinnamon. He concluded that "You're the One for Me" and these releases helping define a genre later described as "electro" which would be expanded upon with the popular song "Planet Rock" by Afrika Bambaataa & the Soulsonic Force.

An overview of the song in Resident Advisor said the song re-entered the cultural zeitgeist again nearly 40 years later due to a newfound interest in post-disco records. The overview specifically at Los Angeles boogie parties likes Funkmosphere, started by Dam-Funk, and similar events in San Francisco like Sweater Funk. Jacon Pena, also known as DJ Guillermo of Sweater Funk, said that nearly every guest DJ at Sweater Funk played "You're the One For Me" saying it was foundational for dance music and the boogie genre.

== Track listings ==
=== 1981 release ===
12" vinyl

- US: Prelude Records / PRL D 621

Side one
No.	Title	Length
1.	"You're the One for Me" (Vocal)	6:59

Side two
No.	Title	Length
1.	"You're the One for Me" (Instrumental)	6:49

=== 1985 release ===
12" vinyl

- UK: Prelude Records / ZT 40302

Side one
No.	Title	Length
1.	"You're the One for Me" (Labor of Love Mix, A Paul Hardcastle Remix)	5:55

Side two
No.	Title	Length
1.	"You're the One for Me" (Original Classic Club Mix)	6:58
2.	"Keep On" (A François Kevorkian & Hubert Eaves III Mix)	8:34

== Chart performance ==
1981 weekly chart performance
Chart	Peak position
US Disco Top 80 (Billboard)	29
US Hot Soul Singles (Billboard)	69
US Top 100 (Cashbox)	37

1982 weekly chart performance
Chart	Peak position
UK Singles	30
US Disco Top 80 (Billboard)	1
US Hot Soul Singles (Billboard)	13
US Top 100 (Cashbox)	8 (Note: Attributed across multiple issues:)

1985 weekly chart performance
Chart	Peak position
UK Singles: Labor of Love Mix	15

== Personnel ==
Credits adapted from the 12" vinyl.

- Hubert Eaves III – composer, producer, arrangements, mixing
- James Williams – composer
- Pete & Mike – recording
- François Kevorkian – mixing
- John Potoker – engineer
- Herb Powers Jr. – mastering

== See also ==
- List of Billboard number-one dance singles of 1982
