= James D-Train Williams =

American singer, songwriter and actor

D Train
- Born: James Nelson Williams; 1962 (age 63–64); Brooklyn, New York
- Genres: Post-disco; R&B; soul; funk; hip hop; dance; rock; gospel
- Occupations: Singer; songwriter; producer; actor; businessman; philanthropist
- Instruments: Vocals; guitar; keyboards
- Years active: 1980–present
- Labels: Prelude; Columbia

James Nelson Williams (born January 21, 1962), known by the stage name D Train (stylized as D TRAIN), is an American singer, songwriter, instrumentalist, producer and actor. He rose to fame in the early 1980s with the release of his first album "You're the One for Me" (working with songwriter/producer Hubert Eaves III initially as a duo, also called D Train), which spawned his first US Billboard Dance chart number-one hit, "You're the One for Me". His debut album (under the Prelude Records label) would also chart with the hits "Keep On" and the much covered Burt Bacharach hit "Walk on By". He would go on to work with Eaves producing hits on the follow-up albums Music and Something's on Your Mind before being signed to Columbia Records, producing the albums Miracles of the Heart and In Your Eyes. The two parted ways in 1988 and D Train went on to perform on his own label, releasing the album 701 Franklin Ave.

He is married to makeup artist, wardrobe stylist, producer, and actress Bebé Ellison.

== Biography ==
=== Early life ===
James Nelson Williams was born in Williamsburg, Brooklyn, New York. He began singing at age 6 in the Washington Temple COGIC choir under the direction of Professors Henry and Irene Coston. He would later come under the direction of gospel singer Rev. Timothy Wright. At 10 years old, a Jackson 5 performance he saw on the Ed Sullivan Show inspired him to begin studying jazz guitar. He attended Erasmus Hall High School and played defensive tackle on the high school football team. It was here that the earned the nickname D Train after the well-known MTA Brooklyn subway line because, according to the team's captain, "When he hits you, it’s like being hit by a train".

While working on a project with his classmate, R&B singer Will Downing, D Train was introduced to musician/producer Hubert Eaves III. The duo broke out as an R&B/Dance group under the D Train name.

=== Music career ===
==== D Train as a band ====
D Train was signed to Prelude Records and their debut hit single "You're the One for Me" was released in late 1981, which reached No. 1 on Billboard's Dance chart and remained there for three weeks. The single also charted at No. 13 on Billboard's R&B chart and No. 30 in the UK's Top 100.

D Train's self-titled debut album was released in early 1982, but with the popularity of their first single, "You’re the One for Me" was adopted as the album's new title. The album produced their next hit single "Keep On", mixed by record producer François Kevorkian, which peaked at No. 2 on Billboard's Dance chart and No. 15 on Billboard's R&B chart. The album's third single, the much covered Burt Bacharach single "Walk on By", also charted in both the US and the album reached No. 16 on the Billboard R&B Album chart, No. 128 on the Pop Album chart and No. 72 on the UK Album chart.

D Train's second album, Music, was released in 1983. They again enjoyed chart success in both the US and the UK with their first single "Music", which peaked at No. 12 on the Billboard Dance chart, No. 20 on Billboard's R&B chart and No. 23 on the UK's top 100 chart. The album's third single, "Keep Giving Me Love" again proved successful on both sides of the Atlantic, charting at No. 24 on the Billboard Dance chart, No. 55 on the R&B chart and No. 65 on the UK's top 100. The album peaked at No. 31 on the R&B Album chart.

The duo's third album, Something's on Your Mind, was released in 1984, becoming the final album the duo would release under the Prelude Records label. The title track for this album, released as the second single, became D Train's first Pop crossover success, peaking at No. 5 on the R&B chart and No. 79 on Billboard Hot 100. This album found the band branching out into new musical territory, incorporating elements of reggae and more adult-oriented R&B into their music. It included a cover of Carole King's "So Far Away."

In 1985, a remix of their debut single "You're the One for Me", featuring the work of Paul Hardcastle, was featured on a new Greatest Hits album released in the U.K. This remixed version peaked at No. 15 on the UK's Top 100. Meanwhile, in America, D Train entered Billboard's R&B chart again with the single "Just Another Night (Without Your Love)", which reached No. 59 and preceded an American Greatest Hits album released the following year.

==== D Train as a solo artist ====
In 1986, Williams was signed by Columbia Records and released Miracles of the Heart. Although he was still collaborating with Eaves at this time, this first album for Columbia was viewed as more of a "solo" effort for Williams. The album produced several hits, including the single "Misunderstanding", which rose to No. 10 on the Billboard R&B/Hip Hop chart. The follow-up single, "Oh How I Love You (Girl)" went to No. 22 on the R&B/Hip Hop chart. The album was No. 51 on Billboard's R&B Albums chart.

D Train's next album, In Your Eyes was released in 1988. The title track from the album made it to No. 11 on the R&B/Hip Hop chart, while the follow-up single "Runner" failed to chart. The album reached No. 46 on the R&B Album chart.

Following the departure from Columbia and Eaves, D Train went on to pursue his own interests as a solo artist and songwriter. He would later write songs for other artists, among them were Vanessa Bell Armstrong and John P. Kee’s "Something on the Inside", Patti Austin's "I'll Be Waiting for You", George Duke's "Children of the Night" and "You Are the One in My Life" and Carl Anderson's "Children of a Lesser God".

In 2007, D Train released his sixth album 701 Franklin Ave. under his own label. The 14 track album was written and composed by himself. It included a rare live version of "Keep On".

=== Television and film ===
D Train provided vocals on the 1997 soundtrack for the film Hercules.

D Train sang the original "Pokérap", the official closing credit theme song for the anime Pokémon in 1998. The song also appeared on the show's official soundtrack. That same year, he provided backing vocals on the song "Eyes of a Child", written by Trey Parker and performed by Michael McDonald for the film South Park: Bigger, Longer & Uncut.

In 2004, "You're the One for Me" appeared on the soundtrack of the British film the Football Factory (2004).

D Train appeared on camera and performed on the soundtrack of the Amy Sedaris/Stephen Colbert film Strangers with Candy (2005).

D Train's performances of "My Funny Valentine" and Hot Chocolate's "You Sexy Thing" appeared in the Halle Berry/Bruce Willis film Perfect Stranger (2007).

=== Other ventures ===
D Train has recorded jingle vocals for commercial spots.

In 2001, SiriusXM satellite radio signed D Train to host "The D Train Show" on the Heart & Soul Channel 51 on the dial. The show was a blend of R&B music and guest interviews. Some notable guests included Lionel Richie, Roberta Flack, Jet Li, John Legend, Chaka Khan and Alicia Keys. The show ran until 2008.

In 2008, he co-narrated the audiobook adaption of Walter Dean Myers's picture book Jazz alongside Vaneese Thomas, which won the 2008 Odyssey Award.

He performed at the INDUSTRIAL Event Space for SOULFUL Sundays with Elisa Fiorillo every Sunday from July 17, 2022 to August 21. Each Sunday night supported a local nonprofits, such as Opportunity Village, Nathan Adelson Hospice, Three Square Food Bank, and Pawtastic Friends.

On September 14, 2022, D Train was honored and rewarded a spot in the Legends of Vinyl Music Hall of Fame. He, alongside Lou Gramm and others, received recognition for their career work in the music industry.

In the 13th Issue of Chic Compass Magazine, D Train appeared in an interview. Later on, in December 2022, he was in a live interview alongside his long time friend Hubert Eaves III with producers from the YouTube channel Meet and Funk.

== Legacy ==
D Train's first three albums were re-released on CD in the 1990s when Unidisc Music acquired Prelude Records and several other New York dance-music labels.

In 1997, the Notorious B.I.G.'s "Sky's the Limit" sampled part of D Train's song "Keep On".

Rapper Yo-Yo's "Iz It Still All Good" sampled D-Train's "Something's on Your Mind," which featured Gerald LeVert, in 1998.

"You're the One for Me" has been remixed by Larry Levan and Shep Pettibone and most recently was sampled by DJ Kue in his 2006 hit "I Got Love". "You're the One for Me" has also been sampled in the song "Girls" by the Prodigy from their album Always Outnumbered Never Outgunned.

In 2011, Prince performed a cover of "You're the One for Me" in a live performance on George Lopez's show Lopez Tonight.

In 2013, "You're the One for Me" was featured in the release of the Rockstar Games video game Grand Theft Auto V. The game was re-released in 2014 for PlayStation 4 and Xbox One.

Williams is the voice behind the famous "Aaaah! (169)" sound, one of over 250 made for the Roland M-DC1 sound module. His voice was taken from his song, "Misunderstanding" from his 1986 album, Miracles of the Heart. The sample is most prominently used on the song "Dilemma" by Nelly featuring Kelly Rowland, as well as Travis Scott's 3500.

== Discography ==
=== Solo albums ===
Year	Album	Label	Format	US R&B
1986	Miracles of the Heart	Columbia Records	LP, CD	51
1988	In Your Eyes	Columbia Records	LP, CD	46
2009	701 Franklin Ave.	Jungshin Inc.	CD	—
2024	The Other Side of the Tracks	Concore Entertainment.	CD	—
"—" denotes releases that did not chart.

=== Solo singles ===
Year	Single	Peak chart positions		
Year	Single	US Dance	US R&B	UK
1986	"You Are Everything"	16	53	―
1986	"Misunderstanding"	5	10	―
1986	"Oh How I Love You (Girl)"	―	22	―
1988	"In Your Eyes"	―	11	―
1988	"Runner"	―	―	97
"—" denotes releases that did not chart.

== See also ==
- List of Billboard number-one dance club songs
- List of artists who reached number one on the U.S. Dance Club Songs chart
