= 701 Franklin Ave. =

Studio album by James D-Train Williams
- Released: 2009
- Recorded: 2003–2006
- Genre: Funk; boogie; urban; synth-pop
- Label: Jungshin Inc.

James D-Train Williams chronology
In Your Eyes (1988)	701 Franklin Ave. (2009)

Professional ratings
Review scores
Source	Rating
Allmusic	link

701 Franklin Ave. is the third solo studio album by James D-Train Williams, known also as part of the American urban/post-disco group D-Train. The record was released in 2009 through Jungshin Inc. It is D-Train's first studio album in more than 20 years.

== Background ==
James D-Train Williams first had an idea for a third solo studio album back in 2001; when he founded his own music label Jungshin Inc. He had originally intended for it to be released sometime between 2005 and 2006. While performing at Paris in 2003, D-Train did a special live version of his 1982 hit "Keep On", which would later be a bonus track on the album.

In 2006 he release the first single from album titled "Ride With Me". 701 Franklin Ave. was released in 2009. The album was completely produced and arranged by himself. The album contains 14 tracks, one of them being a third version of the "D-Train Theme" which he originally recorded while working with Hubert Eaves in 1982.

D-Train's fourth studio album was stated for release in 2015, supposedly it was going to contain some of the recent collaborations with music mixer Lenny Fontana.

== Track listing ==
#	Title	Writer(s)	Length
1.	Pleasure	James "D-Train" Williams	4:21
2.	Take the Road	James "D-Train" Williams	3:23
3.	D-Train Theme III	James "D-Train" Williams	5:08
4.	Ride with Me	James "D-Train" Williams	5:33
5.	Feel the Fire	James "D-Train" Williams	3:22
6.	Tell Me When the Madness Ends	James "D-Train" Williams	3:02
7.	7 Seconds	James "D-Train" Williams	3:08
8.	I Wanna Be Free	James "D-Train" Williams	3:47
9.	When U Going to Wake Up	James "D-Train" Williams	3:01
10.	Lonely Hearts	James "D-Train" Williams	4:46
11.	Have You Really Been Faithful	James "D-Train" Williams	4:44
12.	The World is at War	James "D-Train" Williams	4:00
13.	Devil Left Hell	James "D-Train" Williams	3:58
14.	Seven Rainbows	James "D-Train" Williams	3:14
15.	Keep On [live]	Hubert Eaves III/James "D-Train" Williams	6:16
