= Marvin Schlachter =

American record executive (1933–2024)

- Born: Marvin Herbert Schlachter; November 25, 1933; New York City, U.S.
- Died: September 19, 2024 (aged 90); New York City, U.S.
- Education: City College of New York
- Occupations: Music executive; Record label owner
- Spouse: Trudy Weiner (m. 1962)
- Children: 3
- Musical career
- Genres: Pop, Soul, Disco, Boogie, Freestyle
- Years active: 1959-2000s
- Labels: Scepter Records; Wand Records; Janus Records; Chess Records; Prelude Records

Marvin Herbert Schlachter (November 25, 1933 – September 19, 2024) was an American record company music executive and record label owner. Schlachter was a founder and owner of Scepter Records, Wand Records, Prelude Records, and helmed a number of high ranking roles at others such as GRT Records, Janus Records, Chess Records and Pye Records US.

Schlachter is best known for his work nurturing talent during the 1960s including Dionne Warwick, the Shirelles, Tammi Terrell, Chuck Jackson, The Kingsmen and B.J. Thomas.

== Early life and Scepter ==
Schlachter was born in Manhattan, New York, on November 25, 1933, the son of Jewish immigrants from Poland. He received a degree in business administration from City College in 1955. After two years with the army, he spent some months as a CBS mailroom operative before becoming an advertising representative for Cashbox magazine from 1958 to 1960. Schlachter met Florence Greenburg at a radio station while she was plugging the Shirelles' girl group first single "I Met Him on a Sunday". After Decca dropped the group, Greenburg asked Schlachter to help her start up a new label with the group as its first act. Schlachter spent the following nine years with Scepter Records as executive vice president, overseeing a key role in Scepter's early rise during their successful Bacharach-David-Warwick / Chuck Jackson / BJ Thomas period, with annual revenues within the first few years of operation totalling $3 million.

== GRT (Janus/Chess) ==
The General Recorded Tape company had been working with Scepter during the past decade, and in July 1969 established a joint venture with the England-based Pye Records, to form Janus Records in the United States. An offer was made for Schlachter to become the new label's president. He soon established Janus with eleven hit singles, including a gold record and several chart albums in the first year of operation. Schlachter set about building a competitive business by means of both internal expansion and exclusive distribution agreements with labels such as Westbound and Barnaby, the reactivation of GRT Nashville, and the acquisition of the Metromedia Records Country label. In 1972, Pye Records dropped their interest in Janus Records, and GRT continued the venture, Schlachter being appointed head of all the associated GRT labels which included Chess Records.

== Pye USA, Prelude and Savoy ==
=== Pye/Prelude Records ===
In 1974, Pye established an American version of its record label, ATV/Pye Records. Schlachter was made president of its operations in March 1976, but the label was not a success, having only three top-40 hits out of over 80 singles: Brotherhood of Man's "Save Your Kisses for Me", peaking moderately at #27 on the Billboard Hot 100 during July, Sweet Sensation's "Sad Sweet Dreamer", which hit #14 on the same chart a year before, and Johnny Wakelin's "Black Superman (Muhammad Ali)", a tribute to the titular boxer, which hit #21 on that chart in 1975. Further issues over financing and artistic direction led to Pye UK closing it down in January 1977. Schlachter then started Prelude Records in February 1977, named after one of Pye's acts of the time, Prelude; its initial LP and 45 catalogue series were carried over from the ill-fated Pye label (with the catalogue prefix changed from PYE- to PRL-), along with a number of artists already signed. Staff at the burgeoning label included DJ Francois Kevorkian taking up an A&R role and production duties. Prelude had a string of disco and dance music hits into the mid-1980s, the label's most prominent acts including France Joli and James 'D-Train' Williams. The label was closed in 1986, and its catalog sold to Unidisc.

=== Savoy Records ===
Savoy Records was a gospel and jazz label from the 1940s, the gospel arm was obtained by Schlachter from 1983 and run alongside Prelude. Its best known acts were Albertina Walker, Rev. Clay Evans, and the New Jerusalem Baptist Choir. The label was sold to Malaco Records in late 1986.

== Later interests ==
=== MicMac/MarTru Records ===
In 1987, Micky Garcia, a New York DJ, attended the New Music Seminar at the Marriot Marquis hotel in Times Square where he met Schlachter. Garcia was aware of his background having had played many songs from the Prelude Records roster while performing on Kiss FM. Schlachter asked Garcia if he would produce songs for MarTru Records (a portmanteau of Marvin and Trudy, his wife), a new record label he was starting up, which was duly done in June 1987 with funding from Schlachter. While MicMac catered to the main pop and freestyle genre, MarTru ended up being a sub label to MicMac and focused on the house, street and progressive club sound. MicMac Records became a leading outlet of freestyle music in the late-80s to the early-90s and their most well-known artists were Johnny-O and Cynthia. MicMac would regularly release output until the middle 2010s.

=== Topaz Records ===
This was a label run by Schlachter's son, issuing releases from 1999 but stopped releasing titles in the mid-2000s and was later sold. Schlachter assisted in day-to-day backend operations, but not in artistic direction or creative decision making.

== Personal life and death ==
In 1962, Schlachter married Trudy Weiner, and they had three children. Trudy is an author having written six books as well as a photographer, taking portraits of Prelude label artists for album covers and other notables in the music industry. As of 2024, she is co-president of the Women's Division at the Albert Einstein College of Medicine, and a real estate broker.

A house built on Long Island, New York for the family was designed by Norman Jaffe and constructed in 1973.

Schlachter died from intestinal cancer at a hospital in Manhattan, on September 19, 2024, at the age of 90.
