= Passion (New York band) =

- Origin: New York, New York, U.S.
- Genres: Disco; Soul; Boogie; Dance
- Years active: 1979–1984
- Labels: Prelude
- Past members: Dwight York; Richard Noriega Jr. Leon Pendarvis

Passion was a short-lived disco and post-disco music band featuring cult leader and convicted pedophile Dwight York. Their style mixed funk and Latin rhythms combined with sensual lyrics. An eponymous debut album was released in 1979. They continued publishing music until 1984.

Their first single "Don't Bring Back Memories" gained substantial club play when it was released in 1980. The song, written by multi-instrumentalist Ray Martinez and remixed by François Kevorkian, featured background vocals of Dara Norman, David Romero and Martha Roque. The B-side was "In New York", over eleven minutes in length.

In 1982, they released their "biggest" dance hit "Don't Stop My Love", a song written by Kashif Saleem. The band followed up with "You Can't Hide It", a song recorded under the creative control of Eric Matthew in 1984.

Dwight York afterwards released two albums titled New and Re-New under his own label York's Records. The albums contained songs like "Life Is But a Dream" and "I Hurt". He was later imprisoned for multiple crimes including child sexual abuse.

== Discography ==
=== Albums ===
- 1979 Don't Stop My Love (Prelude; U.S.)
- 1992 Don't Stop My Love (re-release with new tracks) (Unidisc; Canada)

=== Singles ===
Year	Title	Label	Peak chart positions
Year	Title	Label	U.S. Dance
1980	"Don't Bring Back Memories/In New York"	Prelude	43
1982	"Don't Stop My Love"	Prelude	―
1984	"You Can't Hide (It)"	Prelude	―
"—" denotes release that did not chart
