= D Train (album) =

You're the One for Me

Studio album by "D" Train
- Released: April 1982
- Recorded: 1981–82
- Genre: Post-disco, urban contemporary, soul, gospel
- Length: 41:55
- Label: Prelude (US PRL 14105); Epic (UK EPC 85683); Unidisc Records
- Producer: Hubert Eaves III

"D" Train chronology
You're the One for Me (1982)	Music (1983)

Professional ratings
Review scores
Source	Rating
AllMusic	4/5 stars
Muzik	8/10
Robert Christgau	B+

"D" Train (a.k.a. You're the One for Me) is the debut album by the American urban/post-disco group D-Train, released in United States on 1982 by Prelude Records, and in United Kingdom by Epic Records. The album was remastered by Canadian label Unidisc Music in 1992 including five bonus tracks.

The album was produced by its musical group member Hubert Eaves III.

== Track listing ==
All songs written by Hubert Eaves III and James Williams except where noted.

Side A

1. "You're the One for Me" – 4:57
2. "Walk On By" (Burt Bacharach, Hal David) – 5:28
3. "Tryin' to Get Over" – 5:26
4. "Lucky Day" (Eaves) – 4:58

Side B

1. "'D' Train Theme" – 5:17
2. "Keep On" – 6:45
3. "Love Vibrations" – 5:19
4. "You're the One for Me [Reprise]" – 3:45

CD reissue bonus tracks
No.	Title	Writer(s)	Length
9.	"Walk on By [Remix]" (a François Kevorkian remix)	Burt Bacharach; Hal David	6:11
10.	"'D' Train Theme [Dub]" (François Kevorkian mix)	Hubert Eaves III; James "D-Train" Williams	7:21
11.	"Keep On [Remix]" (a François Kevorkian/Hubert Eaves III remix)	Hubert Eaves III; James "D-Train" Williams	8:37
12.	"You're the One for Me [Remix]" (a François Kevorkian remix)	Hubert Eaves III; James "D-Train" Williams	5:55
13.	"Keep On [Radio Edit]" (a François Kevorkian remix)	Hubert Eaves III; James "D-Train" Williams	4:21
Total length:			31:45

== Performers ==
- Lead vocals – James Williams
- Bass guitar – Basil Ferrington – (track 4), Kevin Eaves (track 3)
- Drums – Howard King (tracks 1–4 and 6–8), Hubert Eaves Jr, IV (track 5)
- Electric guitar – Butch Campbell (track 6), Billy "Spaceman" Paterson (5)
- Lisa Fisher – backing vocals (track 5)
- Backing vocals, background arrangement – Neil Trotman (track 3)
- Cello – Jesse Levy, Seymour Barab
- Concertmaster – Guy Lumia
- Strings – Regis Iandiorio, Marilyn Wright, Marvin Morganstern, Max Ellen, Paul Gershman
- Keyboards, vocals, strings arrangement – Hubert Eaves III
- Percussion – Hubert Eaves III, Hubert Eaves Jr, IV (track 1)
- Percussion – Steve Kroon

=== Production ===
- Mastering – Herbie Powers Jr.
- Artwork – Trudy Schlachter
- Mixing – François Kevorkian, Hubert Eaves III

== Charts ==
=== Weekly charts ===
Chart (1982)	Peak position
UK Albums (OCC)	72
US Billboard 200	128
US Top R&B/Hip-Hop Albums (Billboard)	16

=== Year-end charts ===
Chart (1982)	Position
US Top R&B/Hip-Hop Albums (Billboard)	43

=== Singles ===
Year	Title	Label	Peak chart positions		
Year	Title	Label	US Dance	US R&B	UK
1981	"You're the One for Me"	Prelude	1	13	30
1982	"Keep On"	Prelude	2	15	—
1982	"Walk On By"	Prelude	45	42	44
1982	"D Train's Theme"	Prelude	45	―	―
