= 7 Days of Funk =

7 Days of Funk may refer to:

- 7 Days of Funk (group), an American funk duo
- 7 Days of Funk (album), a 2013 album by 7 Days of Funk
