= Oh, Brother! (disambiguation) =

Oh, Brother! is a British television sitcom originally broadcast from 1968 to 1970.

Oh, Brother! may also refer to:

- Oh, Brother! (comic strip), by Bob Weber Jr. and Jay Stephens
- "Oh, Brother!" (AoSMB3 episode), an episode of The Adventures of Super Mario Bros. 3
- "Oh! Brother", a 1984 single by the Fall

== See also ==
- O Brother, Where Art Thou?, a 2000 comedy film
- "Oh Brother, Where Art Thou?", a 1991 episode in the second series of The Simpsons
- "O Brother, Where Bart Thou?", a 2009 episode in the 21st series of The Simpsons
- "Oh Brother...She's my Sister", a Barney & Friends episode
- "Oh Brother (You've Got a Long Way to Go)", a 1980 song by Finch & Henson
- "Oh Brothers", an episode of Snuff Box
- O'Brother, an Atlantan rock band
- "Oh Brother", the 9th studio album by Dawes
- Oh! Brothers, a band
- Oh! Brothers (2003 film), South Korean film by Kim Yong-hwa
