= Body Music (disambiguation) =

Body Music is a 2013 pop album by AlunaGeorge.

Body Music may also refer to:

== Books ==
- Body Music, a 1998 poetry collection by Dennis Lee
- Body Music, a 2017 graphic novel by Jul Maroh

== Music ==
- Body music, or body percussion, music produced by the body
- Body Music, a 1993 avant-garde album by Ellen Fullman
- Body Music, a 1973 performance art video by Charlemagne Palestine
- "Body Music", a 1980 song by Modern Man
- "Body Music", a 1981 song by Chris Rainbow
- "Body Music", a 1981 song by The Strikers
- "Body Music", a 1986 song by Pauline Murray and The Storm
