= Keep On (song) =

Single by D. Train

from the album D. Train
- Released: May 1982
- Genre: Post-disco
- Length: 9:21 (vocal, 12")
- Label: Prelude Records (US PRL-D634)
- Songwriter(s): Hubert Eaves III, James Williams
- Producer(s): Hubert Eaves III, James "D-Train" Williams

D. Train singles chronology
"You're the One for Me" (1981)	"Keep On" (1982)	"Walk On By" (1982)

"Keep On" is a post-disco song written by Hubert Eaves III and James Williams of D. Train. It was remixed by François Kevorkian and Eaves. The song reached No. 2 on the Billboard Hot Dance Club Play chart and number No. 15 on the R&B chart in 1982.

== Track listing ==
- 12" single

Side one
No.	Title	Length
1.	"Keep On" (vocal)	9:21

Side two
No.	Title	Length
1.	"Keep On" (dub mix)	3:44

== Personnel ==
- Herb Powers Jr. – mastering
- François Kevorkian, Hubert Eaves III – mixing
- Hubert Eaves III – rhythm arrangement, producer
- Hubert Eaves III, James "D-Train" Williams - vocal arrangement

== Chart positions ==
Chart (1982)	Peak position
U.S. Billboard Hot Dance Club Play	2
U.S. Billboard Black Singles	15

== Legacy ==
"Keep On" was sampled by Rockers Revenge on the song "Walking on Sunshine" in late 1982. It was also sampled for the chorus of the Notorious B.I.G. song "Sky's the Limit".
