= Rafael Cameron =

Guyanese American singer-songwriter

- Also known as: Rafael Cameron
- Born: 1951 (age 74–75); Georgetown, Guyana
- Origin: United States
- Genres: R&B; Post-disco; Boogie; Funk; Gospel
- Occupation: Singer
- Instrument: Vocals
- Years active: 1980–
- Labels: Salsoul

Rafael Cameron (born 1951) is a Guyanese American singer-songwriter best known for his boogie song "Boogie's Gonna Get Ya", which was remixed by François Kevorkian. His most successful single in his career was, however, "Magic Of You (Like The Way)"/"Get It Off".

His albums and singles were produced by Randy Muller of Skyy.

== Career ==
In 1980, Cameron was signed to a prominent funk and post-disco label Salsoul Records. He recorded three albums in total, which all entered the Billboard pop and R&B charts. All of his work was mostly written by Randy Muller and the Cameron himself. His most successful work include singles like "Let's Get It Off" (Club #17), "Magic of You" (R&B #16) and "Funtown U.S.A." (Club #55).

=== Studio albums ===
Year	Album	Chart positions			Record label
Year	Album	US	US R&B	UK	Record label
1980	Cameron	67	18	—	Salsoul
1981	Cameron's in Love	101	29	—	Salsoul
1982	Cameron All the Way	—	43	—	Salsoul
1997	I'm New In Christ Jesus	—	—	—	Noremac Productions
2003	Right Off The Pages Vol.1	—	—	—	Self-released
2004	Unto Us A Child Is Born	—	—	—	Self-released
2008	Tributes	—	—	—	Self-released
"—" denotes the album failed to chart.

=== Singles ===
Year	Single	Chart positions			
Year	Single	US	US R&B	US Dance	UK
1980	"Funkdown"	—	33	—	—
1980	"Let's Get It Off"	—	—	17	—
1980	"Magic of You"	—	16	—	—
1981	"Boogie's Gonna Get Ya'"	—	53	—	—
1981	"Feelin's"	—	67	—	—
1981	"Funtown U.S.A."	—	21	55	—
"—" denotes the single failed to chart

=== Other singles ===
- 1982: "Desires" (Salsoul-SG 373)
- 1982: "Shake It Down" (Salsoul-S7 7035) - R&B #81
- 1981: "All That's Good To Me" (Salsoul-SALT 10) - UK release only
- 1981: "Daisy" (Salsoul-SG 355)
