= Something's on Your Mind =

Studio album by D Train
- Released: 1984
- Recorded: 1983–84
- Genre: Post-disco, urban contemporary, soul
- Length: 67:14
- Label: Prelude (US PRL 14105); Unidisc Records
- Producer: Hubert Eaves III

D Train chronology
Music (1983)	Something's on Your Mind (1984)	Miracles of the Heart (1986)

Professional ratings
Review scores
Source	Rating
AllMusic	3/5 stars

Something's on Your Mind is the third and final studio album by the American urban/post-disco group D Train, released in 1984 by Prelude Records in the US and United Kingdom. The album was remastered by Canadian label Unidisc Music in 1992 including five bonus tracks.

The album was produced by its musical group member Hubert Eaves III. Recording Sessions began in late 1983 and finished in mid 1984.

The album's title track was D Train's only entry on the Billboard Hot 100, peaking at #79. It would be covered by jazz trumpeter Miles Davis for his 1985 album, You're Under Arrest.

== Track listing ==
#	Title	Writer(s)	Length
1.	"Something's on Your Mind"	Hubert Eaves III/James "D-Train" Williams	6:37
2.	"I Treasure Your Pleasure"	Hubert Eaves III/James "D-Train" Williams	6:41
3.	"You're the Reason"	Hubert Eaves III/James "D-Train" Williams	5:25
4.	"Hustle and Bustle of the City"	Hubert Eaves III/James "D-Train" Williams	5:47
5.	"Thank You"	Hubert Eaves III/James "D-Train" Williams	6:09
6.	"I'll Do Anything"	Hubert Eaves III/James "D-Train" Williams	5:19
7.	"So Far Away"	Carole King	2:15
8.*	"Thank You" [remix]	Hubert Eaves III/James "D-Train" Williams	6:55
9.*	"Something's on Your Mind" [dub version]	Hubert Eaves III/James "D-Train" Williams	6:08
10.*	"Thank You" [dub remix]	Hubert Eaves III/James "D-Train" Williams	7:20
11.*	"Something's on Your Mind" [radio edit]	Hubert Eaves III/James "D-Train" Williams	4:53
12.*	"Thank You" [radio edit]	Hubert Eaves III/James "D-Train" Williams	4:07

(*) Bonus tracks on the remastered version.
