= Faden Away =

2013 single by 7 Days of Funk

Single by 7 Days of Funk (Dam-Funk & Snoopzilla)

from the album 7 Days of Funk
- A-side: "Hit Da Pavement"
- Released: October 15, 2013
- Recorded: 2013; The Compound (Los Angeles, California)
- Genre: G-funk; electro-funk
- Length: 5:40
- Label: Stones Throw Records
- Songwriters: Calvin Broadus; Damon Riddick
- Producer: Dam-Funk

Snoopzilla singles chronology
"Ashtrays and Heartbreaks" (2013)	"Faden Away" (2013)	"Hit Da Pavement" (2013)

Dam-Funk singles chronology
"Hood Pass Intact" (2010)	"Faden Away" (2013)

Music video
- "Faden Away" on YouTube

"Faden Away" is a song by California-based funk duo 7 Days of Funk, released as the lead single of their eponymous debut studio album. The song was released on the iTunes Music Store and Stones Throw Records' website on October 15, 2013. On December 10, the single was released along with "Hit Da Pavement" as a cassette single, later given away exclusively with the first week's orders of the LP and 45 box set.

The single was initially an instrumental track titled "Fadin" from Dam-Funk's EP I Don't Wanna Be a Star! (2012). After Snoop Dogg discovered the track, he wrote lyrics to the instrumental based on his experiences in life. The duo would later consider "Faden Away" as their favorite track on 7 Days of Funk (2013). In promotion of the single and album, Snoop Dogg and Dam-Funk released its music video and performed the single on multiple talk shows.

"Faden Away", written by Calvin Broadus and Damon Riddick, was recorded at The Compound in Los Angeles, California in 2013. The song, mixed by Shon Lawon and Cole M.G.N., was produced by Riddick under his stage name Dam-Funk and the vocals were performed by Broadus under the moniker Snoopzilla (also known as Snoop Dogg). The song also features background vocals from Shon Lawon and Val Young.

== Background and concept ==
"Faden Away"
Part of the first verse of "Faden Away", where Snoop Dogg uses autotuned vocals to sing about relationships over Dam-Funk's electro-funk production.

Snoop Dogg discovered that Dam-Funk had an instrumental track titled "Fadin" from his 2012 EP I Don't Wanna Be a Star!. The former wrote his lyrics for the instrumental and created "Faden Away" based closely on his own life experiences. Dam-Funk explained that the idea was “just real” because many people can identify with the experience of drifting out of romantic relationships. He also noted that Snoop Dogg was able to interpret the mood of the instrumental without needing direction. Snoop Dogg handled the vocals and Dam-Funk provided the production in a collaborative split.

A G-funk and electro-funk song, the Southern California duo described "Faden Away" as their favorite track on their eponymous album. Snoop Dogg explained in an interview with HipHopDX that his vocals were sung and that emphasized the song’s central idea, which explores how relationships can slowly weaken over time, not just to romantic partners, but also to family members and other personal connections. He also reflected that people often blame one side when relationships fall apart, but he sees effort being made to maintain them even in difficult situations. Snoop Dogg added that the song also mirrors his own life in multiple areas.

== Release ==
On October 15, 2013, Snoop Dogg and Dam-Funk released "Faden Away" on the iTunes Music Store, in promotion of their studio album 7 Days of Funk (2013). It was also made available to Stones Throw Records' music store, with the addition of the song's instrumental. On December 10, during the album's release, the song was released alongside "Hit Da Pavement" as a cassette single, with both vocal and instrumental versions. The cassette single was given away exclusively with the first week's orders of the LP and 45 box set.

== Music video ==
On November 5, 2013, the music video for "Faden Away" premiered on Stones Throw's YouTube channel. The vintage-looking footage was directed by Henry DeMaio, and features Snoop Dogg donning a jerry curl wig while performing alongside Dam-Funk at a smoke-filled house party in Los Angeles. At a certain point during the night, Snoop Dogg finds a girl in the audience and takes an interest in her. The clip ends with Snoop Dogg bringing the girl back to his room, with a "To Be Continued…" sign before its end. Henry DeMaio wrote on Twitter that he directed two videos for the album. On December 10, the music video for "Hit Da Pavement" premiered on Vevo and serves as the continuation of the plot in "Faden Away".

== Live performances ==
On October 21, 2013, 7 Days of Funk debuted their single on Jimmy Kimmel Live!, along with another song from the album, titled "Do My Thang". Backed by a full band during the performance which was highlighted by an appearance from Don "Magic" Juan, Snoop Dogg and Dam-Funk both wore matching white gloves, with the latter played his keytar before destroying it. This marked Snoop Dogg’s first appearance on Jimmy Kimmel Live! since the show's very first week of existence and he also sat down for an interview with Jimmy Kimmel. On December 9, the duo performed "Faden Away" on Conan, and on The Queen Latifah Show the following day. For the former show, 7 Days of Funk enlisted their whole band, including hip-hop producer Terrace Martin. Snoop Dogg also sat down with Conan O’Brien for an interview to promote the album and some of his other endeavors. For the latter show, they performed with a stripped-down band accompanied by two white-gloved poppers.

== Critical reception ==
"Faden Away" was met with generally positive reviews from music critics. Richard Spadine of DJBooth complimented the song, noting that Snoop Dogg’s AutoTune vocal style blends effectively with “keytar-driven electro-funk grooves”, resulting in an "eminently catchy end product." Chase Woodruff, writing for Slant, highlighted Dam-Funk's production, calling it a "master class in silky-smooth funktronica production". Nate Patrin of Pitchfork observed that Snoop Dogg approaches breakup themes in a non-antagonistic way, and that his "workmanlike singing voice" fits well with Dam-Funk’s spacious, synth-heavy production.

== Track listing ==
Digital single

No.	Title	Writer(s)	Producer(s)	Length
1.	"Faden Away"	Calvin Broadus, Damon Riddick	Dâm-Funk	5:40

Stones Throw Store digital single

No.	Title	Writer(s)	Producer(s)	Length
1.	"Faden Away"	C. Broadus, D. Riddick	Dam-Funk	5:40
2.	"Faden Away" (Instrumental)		Dam-Funk	5:40

45 Box Set

Side 3A
No.	Title	Writer(s)	Producer(s)	Length
1.	"Faden Away"	C. Broadus, D. Riddick	Dam-Funk	5:40

Side 3B
No.	Title	Producer(s)	Length
1.	"Faden Away" (Instrumental)	Dam-Funk	5:40

Cassette single

Side A: Pave
No.	Title	Writer(s)	Producer(s)	Length
1.	"Hit Da Pavement" (Vocal)	C. Broadus, D. Riddick	Dâm-Funk	4:16
2.	"Hit Da Pavement" (Instrumental)		Dâm-Funk	4:16

Side B: Fade
No.	Title	Writer(s)	Producer(s)	Length
1.	"Faden Away" (Vocal)	C. Broadus, D. Riddick	Dâm-Funk	5:40
2.	"Faden Away" (Instrumental)		Dâm-Funk	5:40

== Credits and personnel ==
Credits were adapted from the liner notes of 7 Days of Funk.

Recording

- Recorded and mixed at The Compound, Los Angeles, California.
- Mastered at Bernie Grundman Mastering, Hollywood, Los Angeles.

Personnel

- Calvin Broadus – composer, vocals, writing
- Cole M.G.N. – mixing
- Brian "Big Bass" Gardner – mastering
- Shon Lawon – background vocals, engineering, mixing
- Damon Riddick – instrumentation, production, writing
- Frank Vasquez – additional engineering
- Val Young – background vocals

== Release history ==
Date	Format	Label
October 15, 2013	Digital download	Stones Throw Records
December 10, 2013	Cassette	Stones Throw Records
