= Hit Da Pavement =

Song by 7 Days of Funk (Dâm-Funk & Snoopzilla)

from the album 7 Days of Funk
- B-side: "Faden Away"
- Released: December 10, 2013
- Recorded: 2013; Funkmosphere Lab (Los Angeles, California)
- Genre: G-funk
- Length: 4:16
- Label: Stones Throw
- Songwriters: Calvin Broadus; Damon Riddick
- Producer: Dâm-Funk

Music video
- "Hit Da Pavement" on VEVO

"Hit Da Pavement" is a song by American funk duo 7 Days of Funk. It is the opening track on their eponymous debut studio album in 2013. The song was written by Calvin Broadus and Damon Riddick. Mixed by Shon Lawon and Cole M.G.N., it was produced by Riddick under his stage name Dâm-Funk and the vocals were performed by Broadus under his moniker Snoopzilla. The song features backing vocals from Shon Lawon and Val Young, and additional vocals from Parliament-Funkadelic bassist Bootsy Collins.

Stones Throw Records released "Hit Da Pavement" along with "Faden Away" on a cassingle on December 10, 2013, with both vocal and instrumental versions. The cassette was given away exclusively with the first week's orders of the LP and 45 box set.

== Background ==
Dâm-Funk and Snoopzilla initially got together for an impromptu performance at the opening of The Dogg House at HVW8 Art + Design Gallery in Los Angeles on February 16, 2011. A month after the meeting, the two began to collaborate when Snoop invited Dâm to perform with him at show at the SXSW Music Festival. They forged a mutual admiration; then unexpectedly, Snoop sent Dâm a cryptic SoundCloud message: "I need some of that heat." Months went by and Snoop went to Dâm's house. "Hit Da Pavement" is the first track 7 Days of Funk recorded.

We went through some tracks and [Snoop] stumbled on one, and we recorded the vocals right there. It's called 'Hit Da Pavement'," Dâm-Funk told Life+Times. "After it stopped, he was like, 'Man, this is too good, I wanna do an EP.' We went on from that and started gelling organically, no business people involved, no labels, no management. From that point, we got down and here we are with an EP.

== Music video ==
The music video for "Hit Da Pavement" premiered on VEVO on December 10, 2013. Directed by Henry DeMaio, the video picks up from the house party in the video for the album's lead single "Faden Away". The retro video finds the West Coast duo driving around the streets of Los Angeles at night with their ladies in Snoop's baby blue Lincoln Continental, and rapping in parking lots. Along the way, a couple bags of cannabis are purchased from a sidewalk dealer and two ladies get picked up in the Lincoln.

== Track listing ==
Cassingle

Side A: Pave
No.	Title	Writer(s)	Producer(s)	Length
1.	"Hit Da Pavement" (Vocal)	C. Broadus, D. Riddick	Dâm-Funk	4:16
2.	"Hit Da Pavement" (Instrumental)		Dâm-Funk	4:16

Side B: Fade
No.	Title	Writer(s)	Producer(s)	Length
1.	"Faden Away" (Vocal)	C. Broadus, D. Riddick	Dâm-Funk	5:40
2.	"Faden Away" (Instrumental)		Dâm-Funk	5:40

45 Box Set

Side 1A
No.	Title	Writer(s)	Producer(s)	Length
1.	"Hit Da Pavement"	C. Broadus, D. Riddick	Dâm-Funk	4:16

Side 1B
No.	Title	Producer(s)	Length
2.	"Hit Da Pavement" (Instrumental)	Dâm-Funk	4:16

== Credits and personnel ==
Recording

- Recorded at Funkmosphere Lab, Los Angeles, California.
- Mixed at The Compound, Los Angeles, California.
- Mastered at Bernie Grundman Mastering, Hollywood, Los Angeles.

Personnel

- Calvin Broadus – composer, vocals
- Cole M.G.N. – mixing
- Bootsy Collins – additional vocals
- Brian "Big Bass" Gardner – mastering
- Shon Lawon – background vocals, engineering, mixing
- Damon Riddick – instrumentation, production
- Frank Vasquez – additional engineering
- Val Young – background vocals

== Release history ==
Date	Format	Label
December 10, 2013	Digital download	Stones Throw Records
December 10, 2013	Cassette	Stones Throw Records
February 5, 2014	7-inch Vinyl	Stones Throw Records
