= Tim Lawrence =

Tim Lawrence may refer to:

- Tim Lawrence (actor), British actor
- Tim Lawrence (author), British author

== See also ==
- Timothy Laurence (born 1955), husband of Anne, Princess Royal
