= Music (D Train album) =

Studio album by D Train
- Released: 1983
- Recorded: 1982–83
- Genre: Post-disco, urban contemporary, soul
- Length: 71:14
- Label: Prelude (US PRL 14105); Unidisc Records
- Producer: Hubert Eaves III

D Train chronology
You're the One for Me (1982)	Music (1983)	Something's on Your Mind (1984)

Professional ratings
Review scores
Source	Rating
AllMusic	2.5/5 stars
Smash Hits	5/10

Music is the second studio album by the American urban/post-disco group D Train, released in 1983 on Prelude Records via the United States and United Kingdom. The album was remastered by Canadian label Unidisc Music in 1992 including five bonus tracks.

The album was produced by its musical group member Hubert Eaves III. Recording sessions began in late 1982 and finished in mid 1983.

== Track listing ==
=== CD release ===
#	Title	Writer(s)	Length
1.	"Keep Giving Me Love"	Hubert Eaves III/James "D-Train" Williams	6:56
2.	"The Shadow of Your Smile"	Johnny Mandel/Paul Francis Webster	6:47
3.	"Are You Ready for Me"	Hubert Eaves III/James "D-Train" Williams	7:11
4.	"Music"	Hubert Eaves III/James "D-Train" Williams	8:12
5.	"Children of the World"	Hubert Eaves III	5:19
6.	"Let Me Show You (A World of Wonder)"	Cheryl Alexander/Hubert Eaves III	4:44
7.	"Don't You Wanna Ride (The "D" Train)"	F. MacFarlayne/Hubert Eaves III/James Batton/James "D-Train" Williams	4:51
8.*	"Keep Giving Me Love"	Hubert Eaves III/James "D-Train" Williams	6:46
9.*	"Keep Giving Me Love" [radio edit]	Hubert Eaves III/James "D-Train" Williams	4:24
10.*	"Are You Ready for Me" [radio edit]	Hubert Eaves III/James "D-Train" Williams	4:12
11.*	"Music" [radio edit]	Hubert Eaves III/James "D-Train" Williams	4:48
12.*	"Music" [dub version]	Hubert Eaves III/James "D-Train" Williams	7:04

(*) Bonus tracks on the remastered version.
