= Wuf Ticket =

American hip hop group

Wuf Ticket were an American hip hop group that consisted of Mustafa Ahmed, James Mason, Earl McField and Karin Wolf. In 1982, they released their debut single "Ya Mama" on Prelude Records. The song peaked at No. 21 on the Billboard R&B singles chart, staying on the chart for 14 weeks. Their follow-up single "The Key" did not chart at all.

== Greaseman ==
Wuf Ticket's "Ya Mama" achieved its greatest notoriety and airplay as a music bed for bits by shock jock The Greaseman on WWDC-FM in Washington, D.C. and later his nationally syndicated radio show where Greaseman would argue with a surly service industry worker.
