= Esoteric Funk =

Studio album by Hubert Eaves
- Released: 1977
- Recorded: May 15–16, 1976
- Genre: Jazz fusion Funk
- Length: 34:16
- Label: Inner City Records / East Wind Records
- Producer: Hubert Eaves

Esoteric Funk is the debut and only album by keyboardist Hubert Eaves.

== Reception ==
Professional ratings
Review scores
Source	Rating
Allmusic	4/5 stars

Released in 1977 on independent jazz label Inner City Records, the album was recorded with the help of James Mtume and Reggie Lucas.

== Track listing ==
All tracks composed and arranged by Hubert Eaves

1. Call to Awareness
2. Painfull Pleasure
3. Slow Down
4. Flead Dancing
5. Song For Marlene
6. Under Standing

== Musicians ==
- Hubert Eaves - all keyboards, vocals on "Slow Down"
- Reggie Lucas - electric guitar
- James Mtume - congas, percussion
- James "Fish" Benjamin - electric bass
- John Lee - electric bass on "Slow Down"
- Howard King - drums
- Rene McLean - reeds, flute
- James Stowe - trombone
- Malachi Thompson - trumpet
- Cheryl Alexander - vocals on "Under Standing"
