= In Your Eyes (D Train album) =

Studio album by James "D-Train" Williams
- Released: 1988
- Recorded: 1987–88
- Genre: Funk; boogie; urban; synth-pop
- Length: 70:43
- Label: Columbia/CBS Records
- Producer: Hubert Eaves III/James "D-Train" Williams

James "D-Train" Williams chronology
Miracles of the Heart (1986)	In Your Eyes (1988)	701 Franklin Ave. (2009)

Professional ratings
Review scores
Source	Rating
Allmusic	link

In Your Eyes is the second solo studio album by James "D-Train" Williams, known also as part of the American urban/post-disco group D-Train. The record was released in 1988 by Columbia Records in the US and via CBS Records in the United Kingdom. The album's biggest hit single, "In Your Eyes" was a number 11 R&B hit in Billboard. The album itself reached number 46 on Billboard's R&B albums chart.

In Your Eyes was remastered and expanded by "Funky Town Grooves" in 2011 including 4 bonus tracks.

== Track listing ==
#	Title	Writer(s)	Length
1.	In Your Eyes	Hubert Eaves IV/Hubert Eaves III/James "D-Train" Williams	6:02
2.	Order in the House	Hubert Eaves III/James "D-Train" Williams	4:59
3.	With All My Heart	Hubert Eaves III/James "D-Train" Williams	5:33
4.	If You Know What I Know	Johnny Hodges/Paul Johnson	4:38
5.	Shadow of Another Love	James "D-Train" Williams	4:17
6.	Runner	Hubert Eaves III/Miles Jaye	5:10
7.	Curious	Hubert Eaves III/ Hubert Eaves III/Dana Eaves	4:40
8.	Child of Love	Hubert Eaves III/James "D-Train" Williams	4:25
9.	Diamond in the Night	Hubert Eaves III/James "D-Train" Williams	4:18
10.	My Friend	Hubert Eaves III/James "D-Train" Williams	3:18
11.	Smile	Hubert Eaves III/James "D-Train" Williams	4:41
12.*	Runner [7-inch version]	Hubert Eaves III/Miles Jaye	4:11 +
13.*	Runner [dub mix]	Hubert Eaves III/Miles Jaye	5:34 +
14.*	In Your Eyes [7-inch version]	Hubert Eaves IV/Hubert Eaves III/James "D-Train" Williams	3:09 +
15.*	In Your Eyes [dub mix]	Hubert Eaves IV/Hubert Eaves III/James "D-Train" Williams	5:48 +

(*) Bonus tracks on the remastered version.
