= Jazz (picture book) =

2006 picture book by Walter Dean Myers

- Author: Walter Dean Myers
- Illustrator: Christopher Myers
- Language: English
- Genre: picture book
- Published: 2006 (a Holiday House Book)
- Publication place: United States
- Awards: Coretta Scott King Award honor book for illustrator
- ISBN: 0-8234-1545-7

Jazz is a 2006 picture book by Walter Dean Myers, illustrated by Christopher Myers. It is a collection of illustrations and rhyming text celebrating the roots of Jazz music.

== Synopsis ==
Jazz is a collection of poetry and illustrations that interprets the styles and roots of jazz music including ragtime, swing, bebop, and fusion.

== Reception ==
Publishers Weekly called the book a "mesmerizing verbal and visual riff on a uniquely American art form." Kirkus Reviews praises this book that "stands as a welcome addition to the literature of jazz: In a genre all too often done poorly for children, it stands out as one of the few excellent treatments."

Jazz was named a Coretta Scott King Award honor book for illustration.

The audiobook adaption, performed by James D-Train Williams and Vaneese Thomas and including original music alongside each poem, won the inaugural Odyssey Award in 2008.
