= Toeachizown =

Studio album by Dâm-Funk
- Released: October 20, 2009 (2x CD); January 2010 (5x LP)
- Recorded: Funkmosphere Lab in Leimert Park, Los Angeles, CA
- Genres: Post-disco, Electro
- Length: 139:37
- Label: Stones Throw Records (STH2232)
- Producers: Leon Sylvers III, Peanut Butter Wolf (exec.), Damon G. Riddick

Dâm-Funk chronology
Rhythm Trax Vol. IV (2008)	Toeachizown (2009)	Adolescent Funk (2010)

Toeachizown is the first solo studio album by American neo-boogie musician Dâm-Funk, released on October 27, 2009 by Stones Throw Records. Album was produced by Leon Sylvers III, a record producer of SOLAR Records and a member of 70s disco group The Sylvers. The album is influenced by 1980s funk, post-disco, electro, boogie, P-funk, sci-fi music of the 1970s and the 1980s and other eighties-influenced music. The album was generally well received by critics.

== Reception ==
Professional ratings
Review scores
Source	Rating
Allmusic	4/5 stars
Pitchfork	(8.2/10)

- The Allmusic (4/5) review by Andy Kellman awarded the album 4 stars stating "what also sets Dâm apart from his contemporaries is a total reliance on, and mastery of, old gear; that's how some of these tracks swing like the best of Mtume's '80s albums while bouncing, kicking, and squirming like Zapp and early Prince."
- The Pitchfork Media (8.2/10) review by Nate Patrin states that "Toeachizown is a deep, astute collection that feels like a natural resuscitation and progression of funk as it stood just before hip hop usurped it."
- The Guardian (unrated) review by Alex Macpherson states that "Though DâM-FunK's brilliant debut album, Toeachizown, is unmistakably funk in lineage, it somehow sounds unlike anything else."

== Track listing ==
All songs written by Damon G. Riddick.

Part I

No.	Title	Length
1.	"Let's Take Off (Far Away)"	6:03
2.	"Come On Outside"	4:17
3.	"Mirrors"	3:19
4.	"One Less Day" (featuring G-Shaft)	5:22
5.	"Brookside Park"	9:49
6.	"The Sky Is Ours"	7:17
7.	"(My Funk Goes) On & On"	4:05
8.	"Searchin' 4 Funk's Future"	7:42
9.	"Love Is Here 2nite (I Can Feel It)"	4:59
10.	"I Wanna Thank You For (Steppin Into My Life)"	6:09
11.	"Fantasy"	6:18
12.	"Keep Lookin' 2 The Sky"	4:34

Part II

No.	Title	Length
1.	"Toeachizown (D-F's Theme)"	2:23
2.	"10 West"	5:55
3.	"Flying V Ride"	5:21
4.	"Burn Straight Thru U"	5:12
5.	"Candy Dancin'" (featuring Mark de Clive-Lowe)	8:23
6.	"Rollin'"	6:58
7.	"Hood Pass Intact"	5:01
8.	"Killdat (aka Killdatmuthafu*ka)"	6:53
9.	"I Gots 2 Be Done Wit' U"	6:09
10.	"LAtrifying"	4:13
11.	"Spacecapades"	6:29
12.	"In Flight"	6:34

== Release history ==
Country	Date	Format
United States	October 20, 2009	CD, LP
Worldwide	October 20, 2009	CD, LP
