= Invite the Light =

Studio album by Dâm-Funk
- Released: September 4, 2015
- Recorded: 2014–15
- Studio: Funkmosphere Lab
- Genre: Funk; soul; R&B
- Length: 1:15:33
- Label: Stones Throw Records
- Producer: Peanut Butter Wolf (exec.); Dâm-Funk; Junie Morrison (co.); Henning (co.)

Dâm-Funk chronology
7 Days of Funk (2013)	Invite the Light (2015)	Above the Fray (2021)

Invite the Light is the second solo studio album by American modern-funk musician Dâm-Funk. It was released on September 4, 2015, via Stones Throw Records. Recording sessions took place at Funkmosphere Lab in Ladera Heights, California. Production was handled by Dâm-Funk himself, with co-producers Junie Morrison and Henning, and Peanut Butter Wolf serving as executive producer. It features contributions from Ariel Pink, Computer Jay, Flea, Jane Jupiter, JimiJames, Jody Watley, Joi, Junie Morrison, Leon Sylvers III, Leon Sylvers IV, Nite Jewel, Novena Carmel, Q-Tip, Snoop Dogg, and I-Ced.

On the chart dated October 10, 2015, the album debuted at number 25 on the Billboard Top R&B Albums chart in the United States.

== Critical reception ==
Professional ratings
Aggregate scores
Source	Rating
Metacritic	77/100
Review scores
Source	Rating
AllMusic	4/5 stars
Consequence of Sound	B−
Drowned in Sound	8/10
Exclaim!	8/10
HipHopDX	3.5/5
Pitchfork	7.6/10
Record Collector	3/5 stars
The Guardian	3/5 stars
The Line of Best Fit	8/10
The Observer	3/5 stars

Invite the Light was met with generally favorable reviews from music critics. At Metacritic, which assigns a normalized rating out of 100 to reviews from mainstream publications, the album received an average score of 77, based on eighteen reviews.

== Track listing ==
All tracks are written by Damon Garrett Riddick.

No.	Title	Producer(s)	Length
1.	"Junie's Transmission" (featuring Junie Morrison)	Dâm-Funk; Junie Morrison (co.)	1:39
2.	"We Continue"	Dâm-Funk	4:46
3.	"Somewhere, Someday"	Dâm-Funk	5:43
4.	"I'm Just Tryna Survive (In the Big City)" (featuring Q-Tip)	Dâm-Funk	4:31
5.	"Surveillance Escape"	Dâm-Funk	6:14
6.	"Floating on Air" (featuring Computer Jay and Flea)	Dâm-Funk	7:12
7.	"HowUGonFuckAroundAndChooseABusta?"	Dâm-Funk	4:58
8.	"The Hunt & Murder of Lucifer"	Dâm-Funk	2:31
9.	"It Didn't Have 2 End This Way"	Dâm-Funk	3:44
10.	"Missing U"	Dâm-Funk	2:19
11.	"Acting" (featuring Ariel Pink)	Dâm-Funk	5:19
12.	"O.B.E."	Dâm-Funk	8:28
13.	"Glyde 2Nyte" (featuring Leon Sylvers III and Leon Sylvers IV)	Dâm-Funk	5:22
14.	"Just Ease Your Mind From All Negativity" (featuring Snoop Dogg and Joi)	Dâm-Funk; Henning (co.)	6:48
15.	"Virtuous Progression" (featuring Jane Jupiter, JimiJames, Jody Watley, Nite Jewel and Novena Carmel)	Dâm-Funk	5:42
16.	"Junie's Re-Transmission" (featuring Junie Morrison)	Dâm-Funk; Junie Morrison (co.)	0:17
Total length:			1:15:33

== Personnel ==
- Damon "Dâm-Funk" Riddick – main artist, producer, recording
- Walter "Junie" Morrison – featured artist & co-producer (tracks: 1, 16)
- Jonathan "Q-Tip" Davis – featured artist (track 4)
- Jason "Computer Jay" Taylor – featured artist & synthesizer (track 6)
- Michael "Flea" Balzary – featured artist & bass guitar (track 6)
- Marcus "Ariel Pink" Rosenberg – featured artist & synthesizer (track 11)
- Leon Frank Sylvers III – featured artist & mixing (track 13)
- Leon Frank Sylvers IV – featured artist (track 13)
- Joi Gilliam – featured artist (track 14), backing vocals (tracks: 2, 15)
- Calvin "Snoop Dogg" Broadus – featured artist (track 14)
- Henning Renema – co-producer (track 14), drum programming & keyboards (track 14)
- Cedric "I, Ced" Norah – backing vocals (track 15), engineering
- Melisa "Jane Jupiter" Young – featured artist (track 15)
- JimiJames – featured artist (track 15)
- Jody Watley – featured artist (track 15)
- Ramona "Nite Jewel" Gonzalez – featured artist (track 15)
- Novena Carmel – featured artist (track 15)
- Wes Osborne – mastering
- Chris "Peanut Butter Wolf" Manak – executive producer
- Keith Eaddy – creative director
- Freddy Anzures – art direction & design
- Brian "B+" Cross – photography
- Wes Harden – management

== Charts ==
Chart (2015)	Peak position
US Top R&B Albums (Billboard)	25
