= Miracles of the Heart =

Studio album by James "D-Train" Williams
- Released: 1986
- Recorded: March 1986
- Genre: Funk; boogie; urban; synth-pop
- Length: 67:27
- Label: Columbia/CBS Records
- Producer: Hubert Eaves III

James "D-Train" Williams chronology
Something's On Your Mind (1984)	Miracles of the Heart (1986)	In Your Eyes (1988)

Professional ratings
Review scores
Source	Rating
Allmusic	3.5/5 stars

Miracles of the Heart is the first solo studio album by James D-Train Williams known also as part of the American urban/post-disco group D Train. The record was released in 1986 by Columbia Records in the US and via CBS Records in the United Kingdom.

The single "Misunderstanding" was a number ten R&B hit in the Billboard charts, while the romantic slow jam "Oh, How I Love You, Girl" made it to number 22 on Billboard's R&B singles chart. The album itself got as far as number 51 on Billboard's R&B albums chart.

Miracles of the Heart was remastered and expanded by Funky Town Grooves in 2011, which included six bonus tracks.

== Track listing ==
#	Title	Writer(s)	Length
1.	You Are Everything	Hubert Eaves III/James "D-Train" Williams	5:29
2.	Oh How I Love You (Girl)	Hubert Eaves III/James "D-Train" Williams	5:14
3.	Miracles of the Heart	Hubert Eaves III/James "D-Train" Williams	5:04
4.	Misunderstanding	Dana Eaves/Hubert Eaves III	7:36
5.	Let Me Love You	Hubert Eaves III/James "D-Train" Williams	5:58
6.	Ice Melts into Rain	James "D-Train" Williams	5:41
7.	I Got Your Number	Hubert Eaves III/James "D-Train" Williams	4:35
8.	Stand Up and Fight	Hubert Eaves III/James "D-Train" Williams	5:03
9.*	Oh How I Love You (Girl) (12-inch version)	Hubert Eaves III/James "D-Train" Williams	6:34
10.*	You Are Everything (acapella)	Hubert Eaves III/James "D-Train" Williams	5:12
11.*	Misunderstanding (12-inch version)	Dana Eaves/Hubert Eaves III	7:32
12.*	Misunderstanding (acapella)	Dana Eaves/Hubert Eaves III	3:48
13.*	Let Me Love You (12-inch version)	Hubert Eaves III/James "D-Train" Williams	6:14
14.*	Let Me Love You (dub mix)	Hubert Eaves III/James "D-Train" Williams	6:08

(*) Bonus tracks on the remastered version
