= Unique (band) =

Post-disco studio act from New Jersey

- Origin: New York, United States
- Genres: Post-disco, garage house
- Years active: 1982–1984
- Labels: Prelude (US); CBS (UK)
- Past members: Deems J. Smith; Darryl K. Henry; Mona M. Norris

Unique was a short-lived post-disco studio act from New Jersey, best known for their crossover number "What I Got Is What You Need" released in 1983 for a well-established dance label, Prelude Records. The group was formed by producer/songwriter Deems J. Smith in 1982 and consists of Smith, Mona Norris, and Darryl K. Henry. The said hit song somewhat established itself on the Billboard Dance Singles and Black Singles charts and even scored over the atlantic reaching No. 27 on UK Singles Chart.

== History ==
Around 1982, record producer Deems J. Smith hired studio musicians to appear in a project he named Unique. He was signed to dance record label Prelude and under this name released two singles: "What I Got Is What You Need" in 1983 and "You Make Me Feel So Good" in 1984. Other people involved in the group were Mona Maria Norris and Darryl K. Henry who co-wrote "What I Got Is What You Need". Smith wrote the second song alone and it was mixed by an aspiring dance-pop producer Shep Pettibone.

== Chart performance ==
Year	Title	Label	Peak chart positions		
Year	Title	Label	US Dance	US R&B	UK
1983	"What I Got Is What You Need"	Prelude; CBS	30	78	27
1984	"You Make Me Feel So Good"	Prelude	―	―	―

== Discography ==
=== Singles ===
"What I Got Is What You Need"

U.S., UK 12" single	1. "What I Got Is What You Need" - 6:36; 2. "What I Got Is What You Need" - 5:54; Written-by: Mona M. Norris, Deems J. Smith, Darryl K. Henry.; Mixed-by: David Todd, Nick Martinelli; Producer: Deems J. Smith

"You Make Me Feel So Good"

U.S. 12" single	1. "You Make Me Feel So Good" (Vocal) - 5:53; 2. "You Make Me Feel So Good" (Instrumental) - 5:53; Written-by: Deems J. Smith; Producer: Deems J. Smith; Mixing: Shep Pettibone

=== Compilation appearances ===
Their song "What I Got Is What You Need" has been reissued on various compilation albums well into the 21st century including, but not limited to:

- Dance Mix - Dance Hits Volume 2 (1983, CBS),
- Essential 80's Garage Dancefloor Classics Volume 1 (1994, Deepbeats),
- Ferry Maat's Soul Show: Saturday Night Grooves (2005, Disky),
- Prelude's Greatest Hits - Volume 3 (Unidisc).

== Legacy ==
Japanese rock musician Toshiki Kadomatsu's adopted portions of "What I Got Is What You Need" into "Step Into the Night". It was a Japan-only release by the Victor-RCA label RVC. The song can be found on his 1984 album AFTER 5 CLASH.

English acid house/electronic music group 808 State's song "Anacodia" samples vocals of "What I Got Is What You Need." The song is on their 1989 album 90.
