= Abstract Truth =

South African rock band

- Origin: Durban, South Africa
- Genres: Progressive rock
- Years active: 1969–1971
- Past members: Ken E Henson; Peter Measroch; Mike Dickman; Robbie Pavid; Ian Bell; Brian Gibson; Sean Bergin; Robbie Pavid; George Wolfaardt; Brian Alderson; Harry Poulos; Eric Dorr; Ramsay Mackay

Abstract Truth was a progressive rock band formed in Durban, KwaZulu-Natal, South Africa in 1969. The band was formed around core member Ken E Henson.

== Career ==
In 1969, Ken E Henson founded the band with Mike Dickman and Pete Measroch. Abstract Truth released two studio albums in 1970, Totum and Silver Trees, and one in 1971, Cool Sounds for Heads. Ken E Henson died on 24 May 2007 from emphysema.

== Albums ==
- 1970: Totum
- 1970: Silver Trees
- 1970: Cool Sounds for Heads
- 2005: Silver Trees & Totum
