= The Strikers (funk band) =

1980s funk/disco band

- Origin: New York City, New York, United States
- Genres: Funk, disco
- Years active: 1980–1982
- Past members: Darryl Gibbs; Howie Young; Milton Brown; Robert Rodriguez; Ruben Faison; Robert Gilliom; Willie Slaughter

The Strikers were a 1980s funk/disco band from New York City. They had greatest success with two 1981 singles "Body Music" (#4 on the US dance chart) and "Inch by Inch" (#15). In The Boston Phoenix, critic Mike Freedberg opined that on their album The Strikers, "the band expands upon what could called 'street jazz' and proves ... that it knows exactly what taboos it is taming, what comparisons its songs make between the curses of the past and the realities of Manhattan."

Members included Darryl Gibbs, Howie Young, Milton Brown (later of Warp 9), Robert Rodriguez, Ruben Faison, Robert Gilliom, and Willie Slaughter.

== Discography ==
=== Studio album ===
- The Strikers (Prelude, 1981)

=== Compilation album ===
- 12" Mixes (Unidisc, 1991)

=== Singles ===
Year	Title	Peak chart positions			
Year	Title	US	US Dance	US R&B	UK
1981	"Body Music"	101	4	23	45
1981	"Inch by Inch"	―	15	58	―
1981	"Strike It Up" / "Bring Out the Devil"	―	―	―	―
1982	"Contagious"	―	―	―	―
"—" denotes releases that did not chart or were not released in that territory.
