= 7 Days of Funk (group) =

American funk duo

- Origin: Long Beach, California, U.S.
- Genres: G-funk; funk; R&B
- Years active: 2013
- Label: Stones Throw Records
- Members: Dâm-Funk; Snoopzilla

7 Days of Funk was an American funk duo from Long Beach, California, composed of rapper Snoopzilla—known professionally as Snoop Dogg—and modern-funk musician Dâm-Funk. The self-titled debut studio album was released on December 10, 2013, by Stones Throw Records.

== Discography ==
Studio albums

- 7 Days of Funk (2013)
