= Ken E Henson =

- Born: Kenneth Edward Henson; March 28, 1947; Durban, South Africa
- Died: May 24, 2007 (aged 60)
- Genres: Progressive rock
- Instruments: Guitar, sitar
- Years active: 1963–2007
- Labels: Uptight, EMI Parlophone, Fresh Music, Warner Bros. Records, WEA

Kenneth Edward Henson (March 28, 1947 – May 24, 2007), better known as Ken E Henson (and also Kenny Henson), was a South African singer, songwriter, guitarist, and sitar player. He co-founded the progressive rock bands Freedom's Children and Abstract Truth. He later formed the duo Finch & Henson with the late Brian Finch.

== Biography ==
Ken E Henson was born in Durban, South Africa on March 28, 1947. He began playing guitar at the age of 10, and formed his first group, Leemen Ltd, in 1963.

Henson's first notable band was Freedom's Children, a group he formed in 1966 with bassist Ramsay Mackay and drummer Colin Pratley. After releasing just two songs with Freedom's Children, he left the band in 1968 to join The Bats for a six-week sojourn. In 1969 he formed the group Abstract Truth with Mike Dickman and Pete Measroch. With Abstract Truth he released three albums from 1969 to 1971. With Brian Finch, he formed Finch & Henson, a duo that toured South Africa extensively from 1971 to 1981. The duo continued to perform periodically until Henson's death.

In the last two decades of his career, Henson worked with many South African musicians, including Piet Botha, Steve Fataar, Neill Solomon, Roger Lucey, Nibs van der Spuy.

== Death ==
Henson died on May 24, 2007, at the age of 60 after suffering from emphysema.

== Discography ==
=== Freedom's Children ===
Album

- 1990: A New Day

Singles

- 1967: "The Coffee Song"
- 1967: "(I Can't Get No) Satisfaction"

=== Abstract Truth ===
Albums

- 1970: Totum
- 1970: Silver Trees

Compilations

- 1970: Cool Sounds for Heads
- 2005: Silver Trees & Totum

=== Finch and Henson ===
Albums

- 1976: Playgrounds in Paradise
- 1978: High Octane
- 1979: Recycled
- 1980: At Home in the Dark

Singles

- 1977: "Free & Easy" (7")
- 1978: "Love You a Little More Every Day" (7")
- 1980: "Oh Brother (You've Got a Long Way to Go)" (7")

=== As Ken E Henson or Kenny Henson ===
- 1974: Bringing Back the Good Times – Brian Finch, featuring Henson
- 1977: Let Us Become Men – as Kenny Henson
- 1977: Playgrounds in Paradise
- 1978: High Octane
- 1978: Giving a Little Away – Ken E Henson's Harambee
- 1979: Recycled
- 1980: At Home in the Dark
- 1993: Free and Easy – The Very Best of Finch and Henson
- 2002: Hero of Heroes – Brian Finch, featuring Henson
- 2002: Another Time, Another Place
- 2003: Never Look Back – Brian Finch, featuring Henson
- 2003: Bringing Back the Good Times (re-issue) – Brian Finch, featuring Henson
