= Secret Weapon (group) =

- Origin: New York, New York U.S.
- Genres: Post-disco • funk
- Labels: Prelude Records

Secret Weapon was a New York-based short-lived post-disco music group, formed by Jerome Prister. The group had a number of hits throughout the 1980s with their most successful single being "Must Be the Music" which hit #24 on the R&B chart and #66 on the dance chart in 1982.

== Post-breakup ==
Band founder Jerome Prister went on to form the short-lived off-shoot group Output and later released several solo singles, along with a 1989 studio album, under the name Jerome "Secret Weapon" Prister. He died of a stroke in 2007.

Singer Michele Blackmon, who also co-wrote "Must Be the Music," later began working as a unit team member managing inmates at a correctional facility, although she would continue performing/entertaining on the side until shortly before her death in late 2014.

Secret Weapon's Djuana "DJ" Thomas is a radio personality on Atlanta's WRDA.

One-time lead vocalist Stanley Snider (credited as "'The' Roy Skip Snider" in liner notes for the band's self-titled album) went on to release several solo singles after the dissolution of the group but would never officially join another group, opting to work more behind the scenes, creating and producing several groups. The founder of a health insurance non-profit, Snider currently works as the CEO of this company and recently announced his return to singing.

== Original members ==
- Djuana "DJ" Thomas - vocals
- Michele Blackmon - vocals
- Kevin Walker - keyboards
- Russell Thomas - lead guitar
- Jeff Bell - rhythm guitar
- Jerome Prister - bass, vocals
- Ricci Paige - drums
- Darren Steward - percussion

== Other members (at various times) ==
- Stanley Snider - vocals
- Bobby Coleman- vocals
- Frank Prato - background vocals
- Calvin Fields - bass guitar
- Dave Brown - drums

== Discography ==
=== Albums ===
Year	Single	Chart positions	
Year	Single	US R&B	US Dance
1983	Secret Weapon	—	—
"—" denotes the single failed to chart

=== Singles ===
Year	Single	Chart positions	
Year	Single	US R&B	US Dance
1982	"Must Be the Music"	24	66
1983	"DJ Man"	73	—
1984	"Move for Me" (as Output)	88	—
1988	"Say You'll Be" (as Jerome "Secret Weapon" Prister)	89	—
"—" denotes the single failed to chart
