= 7 Days of Funk (album) =

2013 collaborative album by 7 Days of Funk

Studio album by 7 Days of Funk
- Released: December 10, 2013
- Recorded: 2013; The Compound (Los Angeles, California); Funkmosphere Lab (Los Angeles, California)
- Genre: G-funk
- Length: 33:56
- Label: Stones Throw
- Producers: Snoopzilla (exec.); Dam-Funk

Dam-Funk chronology
Higher (2013)	7 Days of Funk (2013)	Invite the Light (2015)

Snoopzilla chronology
Royal Fam (2013)	7 Days of Funk (2013)	That's My Work 3 (2014)

Singles from 7 Days of Funk
- 1. "Faden Away" Released: October 15, 2013

7 Days of Funk is the only studio album by California-based funk duo 7 Days of Funk, consisting of rapper Snoop Dogg—performing under his funk persona Snoopzilla—and modern-funk musician Dam-Funk. A G-funk album, it was released on December 10, 2013, by Stones Throw Records. Recording sessions for the album took place in 2013 at The Compound and at Funkmosphere Lab in Los Angeles, and the mastering was performed at Bernie Grundman Mastering in Hollywood.

After Snoop Dogg and Dam-Funk first met at an exhibition and performed in 2011, they recorded a session together with the track “Hit Da Pavement”. After Snoop Dogg was impressed by the track, he and Dam-Funk recorded multiple tracks within a short timeframe, evolving into a studio album. Giving each other creative control, Dam-Funk and Snoop Dogg took significant influences from funk, including various musicians such as Zapp, Rick James, and Funkadelic.

Guest appearances on the album include Tha Dogg Pound members Daz Dillinger and Kurupt, and former Slave frontman Steve Arrington. In promotion of the album, Snoop Dogg and Dam-Funk released the lead single "Faden Away", the promotional single "Hit Da Pavement", performed on Jimmy Kimmel Live!, Conan, and The Queen Latifah Show, and released four music videos. 7 Days of Funk received generally positive reviews from music critics for the duo’s chemistry, production, and a contemporary perspective on the funk genre. Commercially, the album appeared on five Billboard charts, with its greatest performance being at number two on the Heatseekers Albums chart.

== Background ==
Dam-Funk (pictured in 2010) first met Snoop Dogg at an art exhibition based on the latter in 2011

Calvin "Snoopzilla" Broadus and Damon "Dam-Funk" Riddick met in Los Angeles on February 16, 2011, at the opening of The Dogg House—an exhibition of Snoop-inspired artwork—when the latter performed at a gallery party thrown for Joe Cool, an illustrator who made album covers for several of Snoop Dogg's albums, including his debut studio album, Doggystyle (1993) Impressed by Dam-Funk's P-Funk-inspired beats, Snoop Dogg grabbed the microphone and freestyled for more than an hour. "It felt like magic," Snoop Dogg recalls. After the initial meeting, the two paired when Snoop Dogg invited Dam-Funk to play keyboard and keytar onstage for a performance at Funk n Soul Extravaganza at the SXSW Music Festival on March 19. They forged a mutual admiration; then unexpectedly, Snoop Dogg sent Dam-Funk a cryptic SoundCloud message: "I need some of that heat." According to Stones Throw Records founder Chris "Peanut Butter Wolf" Manak, the collaboration made sense because they were approximately the same age and both strongly represented Los Angeles-based funk.

In an October 2013 interview with Rolling Stone, Snoop Dogg said that funk had influenced his music throughout his career and praised Dam-Funk for helping keep the genre alive, adding that this motivated their collaboration. Dam-Funk similarly praised Snoop Dogg's contributions to the project, stating that he had provided some of the “smoothest harmonies and melodies” he had heard. He also said that the album reflected both hip-hop and their shared musical influences, including Zapp, Evelyn "Champagne" King, and Patrice Rushen.

Snoop Dogg also discussed adopting the name Snoopzilla for the project, noting that it was intended as a homage to Funkadelic maestro Bootsy Collins, who has used the monikers Bootzilla and Zillatron. He said that, in this persona, he aimed to reflect the musical spirit associated with Collins, as well as R&B and funk vocal styles associated with artists such as Rick James and Steve Arrington. He also explained that the album explored themes of romantic uncertainty and emotional reflection, though he did not connect them to specific real-life relationships. Snoop Dogg added that, over time, he came to better understand the emotional significance of the songs, which he originally described as being created “out of the spirit of having fun”.

== Recording and production ==
7 Days of Funk was recorded in Los Angeles in 2013 by Shon Lawon at The Compound, except "Hit Da Pavement" which was recorded by Dam-Funk at Funkmosphere Lab. A G-funk album, it was mixed by Cole M.G.N. and Shon Lawon, engineered by Frank Vasquez, and mastered at Bernie Grundman Mastering in Hollywood by Brian "Big Bass" Gardner. The album features guest appearances from Snoop Dogg's Tha Dogg Pound cohorts Daz Dillinger and Kurupt, as well as drummer-vocalist Steve Arrington. According to Dam-Funk, other artists including rapper Tyler, The Creator wanted to be involved on the project, but time ran out. All tracks are produced by Dam-Funk and feature background vocals from Shan Lawon and Val Young.

"Hit Da Pavement"
A 25-second excerpt of "Hit Da Pavement", a track that highlights Snoop Dogg's relaxed flow on Dam-Funk's funk-based production.

In a December 2013 interview with Life+Times, Dam-Funk recalled that the collaboration when Snoop Dogg arrived at his studio without an entourage and recorded vocals for "Hit Da Pavement" on the spot, which was the first track 7 Days of Funk recorded. Impressed by the track, Snoop Dogg proposed expanding the session into a larger project, leading him and Dam-Funk to develop material organically without label or management involvement. Dam-Funk later described the creative chemistry as “explosive" in an interview for Pitchfork, highlighting Snoop Dogg's fast and disciplined work ethic. During the initial session, Snoop Dogg completed his vocals within two hours and continued recording additional tracks rapidly in the following days. The spontaneous production of the album resulted in a seven-track release, with additional material set aside to align with the 7 Days of Funk concept.

Dam-Funk composed the music, while Snoop Dogg came up with the vocals, with the former overseeing the whole production. Snoop Dogg emphasized during an interview with Spin that he gave in to Dam-Funk's direction, allowing him full creative control as a producer and working without deadlines or external pressure, enabling a more relaxed and organic creative process. In turn, Dam-Funk revealed to HipHopDX that he granted Snoop Dogg significant creative freedom on each track, describing the collaboration as highly "telepathic". He noted that Snoop Dogg independently handled vocal nuances with a rhythmic style that closely aligned with his musical style, as it "worked out beautifully." Snoop Dogg explained that the album's length of thirty-four minutes was intended to leave listeners wanting more while maintaining consistent quality throughout. He emphasized that 7 Days of Funk was meant to be played from beginning to end rather than experienced as individual tracks. He also noted that its relatively short runtime encouraged repeat listening, allowing the album to restart seamlessly and reinforce its overall atmosphere.

== Title and artwork ==
According to Snoop Dogg, the album title 7 Days of Funk reflects both the project's seven-track structure and brief period in which it was created, emphasizing a continuous engagement with the funk aesthetic. He described the concept to Spin as cyclical, with each "seven days" representing a commitment to the style. Dam-Funk similarly characterized the title as self-explanatory, framing it as an immersive experience in which funk defines the rhythm of daily life and repeats beyond a single week.

Directed by Stones Throw cover artist Jeff Jank, the album artwork is drawn by Lawrence "Raw Dawg" Hubbard, co-founder and artist behind Los Angeles cult magazine, Real Deal Comix. The vinyl LP edition features a wrap-around drawing showing the front and back of a theater. Snoop Dogg and Dam-Funk are hanging out in front of their low rider—a time machine, in fact—with some thuggish throw-down happening at the theater doors. On the back, there is paparazzi, drunks and prostitutes.

== Promotion and release ==
On October 15, 2013, the lead single, "Faden Away", was made available on the Stones Throw Store and iTunes Music Store. The same day, Stones Throw published on YouTube the behind-the-scenes of 7 Days of Funk's jam session at Funkmosphere Lab. On October 21, the duo performed "Faden Away" on Jimmy Kimmel Live!, along with another song from the album entitled "Do My Thang". On November 5, the music video to "Faden Away" was released, with the duo naming it as their favorite song on the album. For promotional purposes, 7 Days of Funk was made available to stream on December 1, via NPR Music prior to the album's release.

On December 9, 2013, Rdio published on YouTube a 1980s VHS-quality promotional video created by Golden Wolf—an animation production company—featuring Dam-Funk and Snoop Dogg as puppets performing their song "Do My Thang". 7 Days of Funk—including the exclusive bonus track "Wingz"—was streaming exclusively on Rdio the same day until December 24. The duo performed "Faden Away" on Conan later that night, and on The Queen Latifah Show the following day. 7 Days of Funk was officially released on LP, CD, and digital download formats on December 10.

On the day of the album's release, the music video for "Hit Da Pavement" premiered on 7 Days of Funk's Vevo, and Stones Throw released "Hit Da Pavement" and "Faden Away" together on a cassette single on December 10, with both vocal and instrumental versions. The cassette was given away exclusively with the first week's orders of the LP and 45-box set. By the evening, Dam-Funk and Snoop Dogg celebrated the release of 7 Days of Funk at the Exchange Night Club in Los Angeles, performing live with host Peanut Butter Wolf, Egyptian Lover, Bootsy Collins, Steve Arrington, and other musical guests.

On January 15, 2014, the music video was released for "I'll Be There 4U". The 45-box set for the album was released on February 5, with a total of eight records with sixteen tracks: each song on the album released on 7-inch single, backed with its instrumental version. The box includes the bonus record "Wingz"—not available on any other format—with A-side "Systematic". Purchase of the box set came with a digital download of the original eight-track album. Lastly, on February 26, the music video for "Do My Thang" was released.

== Reception ==
Professional ratings
Aggregate scores
Source	Rating
Metacritic	74/100
Review scores
Source	Rating
AllMusic	3.5/5 stars
Blurt	4/5 stars
Exclaim!	9/10
HipHopDX	4.5/5 stars
The New York Times	4/5 stars
Pitchfork	7.0/10
Rolling Stone	2.5/5 stars
Slant	3/5 stars
Spin	7/10
XXL	4/5 (XL)

7 Days of Funk received generally positive reviews from music critics. At Metacritic, which assigns a normalized rating out of 100 to reviews from mainstream critics, the album received an average score of 74, based on 19 reviews. Matt Bauer of Exclaim! praised the album, and commented that apart from a Kurupt cameo on "Ride", 7 Days of Funk is an "infectious, modern take on the funk genre". HipHopDX reviewer Jessica Rew praised 7 Days of Funk, believing the collection features Dam-Funk's best production work to date and viewed it as "Snoop's most enjoyable album in years". Chisom Uzosike of XXL, who awarded the album an "XL" rating, shared a similar sentiment and expressed that "George Clinton would be proud of this fresh take on funk music." Phil Hebblethwaite of NME described the album as both groove-driven and atmospheric, being a contemporary yet forward-looking expression of funk. Ron Hart of Blurt expressed that despite the name of the project being 7 Days of Funk, "there's enough groove in this [record] to last a lifetime."

David Jeffries of AllMusic favorably compared the album to Snoop Dogg's reggae project Reincarnated (2013), describing it as more focused and unpretentious, and characterizing it as a light, enjoyable effort rather than a major artistic statement. Andy Beta of Spin interpreted the collaboration as a reversal of the dynamic seen on Dr. Dre's The Chronic (1992), with an established hip-hop figure spotlighting an independent funk producer. Dave Heaton of PopMatters emphasized the album's laidback grooves and atmospheric focus, praising Dam-Funk's use of classic funk aesthetics and Snoop Dogg's relaxed vocal delivery, while Pitchfork writer Nate Patrin noted its consistency but argued that its adherence to a comfortable style limited a sense of innovation." In a mixed review, Rolling Stone's Mike Powell found Snoop Dogg's vocal style well-suited to the production but criticized the album's lack of cohesion Brian Josephs of Consequence described it as monotonous in places, pointing to its minimal percussion and subdued synthesizer work. Chase Woodruff, writer for Slant, criticized the album's lyrical content and vocal performances, but acknowledged it as a modest creative resurgence for Snoop Dogg, suggesting that its shortcomings were offset by its self-contained and stylistically consistent approach."

Upon its release, 7 Days of Funk appeared in five Billboard charts, with its biggest success being its peak at number two on the Heatseekers Albums chart. Additionally, the album peaked at number 13 on Tastemaker Albums, number 14 on Rap Albums, number 27 on Top R&B/Hip-Hop Albums, and number 33 on Independent Albums.

== Track listing ==
No.	Title	Writer(s)	Length
1.	"Hit Da Pavement"	Calvin Broadus; Damon Riddick	4:16
2.	"Let It Go"	Broadus; Riddick; Patrice Rushen; Freddie Washington	4:34
3.	"Faden Away"	Broadus; Riddick	5:40
4.	"1Question?" (featuring Steve Arrington)	Broadus; Riddick; Steve Arrington	3:45
5.	"Ride" (featuring Kurupt)	Broadus; Riddick; Ricardo Brown	4:04
6.	"Do My Thang"	Broadus; Riddick	4:47
7.	"I'll Be There 4U"	Broadus; Riddick	3:18

Bonus track – 8th day...
No.	Title	Writer(s)	Length
8.	"Systamatic" (featuring Tha Dogg Pound)	Broadus; Riddick; Brown; Delmar Arnaud	3:32
Total length:			33:56

iTunes bonus track
No.	Title	Writer(s)	Length
9.	"High Wit' Me"	Broadus; Riddick	3:02
Total length:			36:58

45 box set bonus track
No.	Title	Writer(s)	Length
9.	"Wingz"	Broadus; Riddick	3:25
Total length:			37:21

Notes

- All tracks are produced by Dam-Funk.
- "Hit Da Pavement" features additional vocals from Bootsy Collins.

== Personnel ==
Credits for 7 Days of Funk are adapted from AllMusic and its liner notes.

- 7 Days of Funk – primary artist
- Delmar "Daz Dillinger" Arnaud – composer
- Steve Arrington – composer, featured artist
- Kevin Barkey – management (Snoopzilla)
- Calvin "Snoopzilla" Broadus – composer, executive producer, vocals
- Ricardo "Kurupt" Brown – composer, featured artist
- Ted Chung – management (Snoopzilla)
- Cole M.G.N. – mixing
- Bootsy Collins – vocals [additional]
- Tha Dogg Pound – featured artist
- Brian "Big Bass" Gardner – mastering
- Wes Harden – management (Dam-Funk)
- Lawrence Hubbard – cover illustration
- Jeff Jank – art direction
- Shon Lawon – engineer, mixing, vocals [background]
- Damon "Dam-Funk" Riddick – engineer, instrumentation, producer
- Patrice Rushen – composer
- Brent Smith – booking
- Frank Vasquez – A&R, engineer
- Freddie Washington – composer
- Val Young – vocals [background]

== Chart positions ==
Chart (2013)	Peak position
US Independent Albums (Billboard)	33
US Top R&B/Hip-Hop Albums (Billboard)	27
US Rap Albums (Billboard)	14
US Heatseekers Albums (Billboard)	2
US Tastemaker Albums (Billboard)	13

== Release history ==
Date	Format(s)	Label	Edition	Catalog	Ref.
December 10, 2013	LP, CD, digital download	Stones Throw	Standard	STH2334	
February 5, 2014	LP	Stones Throw	45-Box Set	STH2335	
