= Hubert Eaves III =

American keyboardist, songwriter and record producer

- Born: Hubert Barclay Eaves III; St. Paul, Minnesota, U.S.
- Genres: Soul; funk; jazz
- Occupations: Record producer, musician, songwriter
- Instrument: Keyboards
- Years active: 1970s–present
- Formerly of: Mtume, D Train
- Website: huberteavesiii.com

Hubert Barclay Eaves III is an American keyboardist, songwriter and record producer. In the early 1980s, he worked on hits by the dance act D-Train. He also did session work with Mtume.

== Biography ==
Hubert Barclay Eaves III was born in St. Paul, Minnesota, where he was taught piano by his father. He began his career in the 1970s as a session keyboard player for the band Mtume. He later produced for artists such as Miles Davis, Stephanie Mills, Madonna, Luther Vandross, Whitney Houston, Aretha Franklin and Phyllis Hyman.

In 1977, Eaves released his only solo album Esoteric Funk. During the 1980s he worked alongside James D-Train Williams as the duo D Train. They enjoyed success with the songs "You're the One for Me" and "Keep On". He later produced Williams' solo albums Miracles of the Heart (1986) and In Your Eyes (1988).

== Discography ==
Solo work

- Esoteric Funk (1977)

With Gary Bartz

- I've Known Rivers and Other Bodies (Concord/Universal, 1973)

With Carlos Garnett

- Journey to Enlightenment (Muse, 1974)
- Let This Melody Ring On (Muse, 1975)

With René McLean

- Watch Out (SteepleChase, 1975)
