= Tim Lawrence (author) =

British author

Tim Lawrence is a British author. He is Professor of Cultural Studies at the University of East London.

== Books ==
- Love Saves the Day: A History of American Dance Music Culture, 1970-79 (Duke University Press, 2004)
- Hold On to Your Dreams: Arthur Russell and the Downtown Music Scene, 1973-92 (Duke University Press, 2009)
- Life and Death on the New York Dance Floor (Duke University Press, 2016)
