= Dam-Funk =

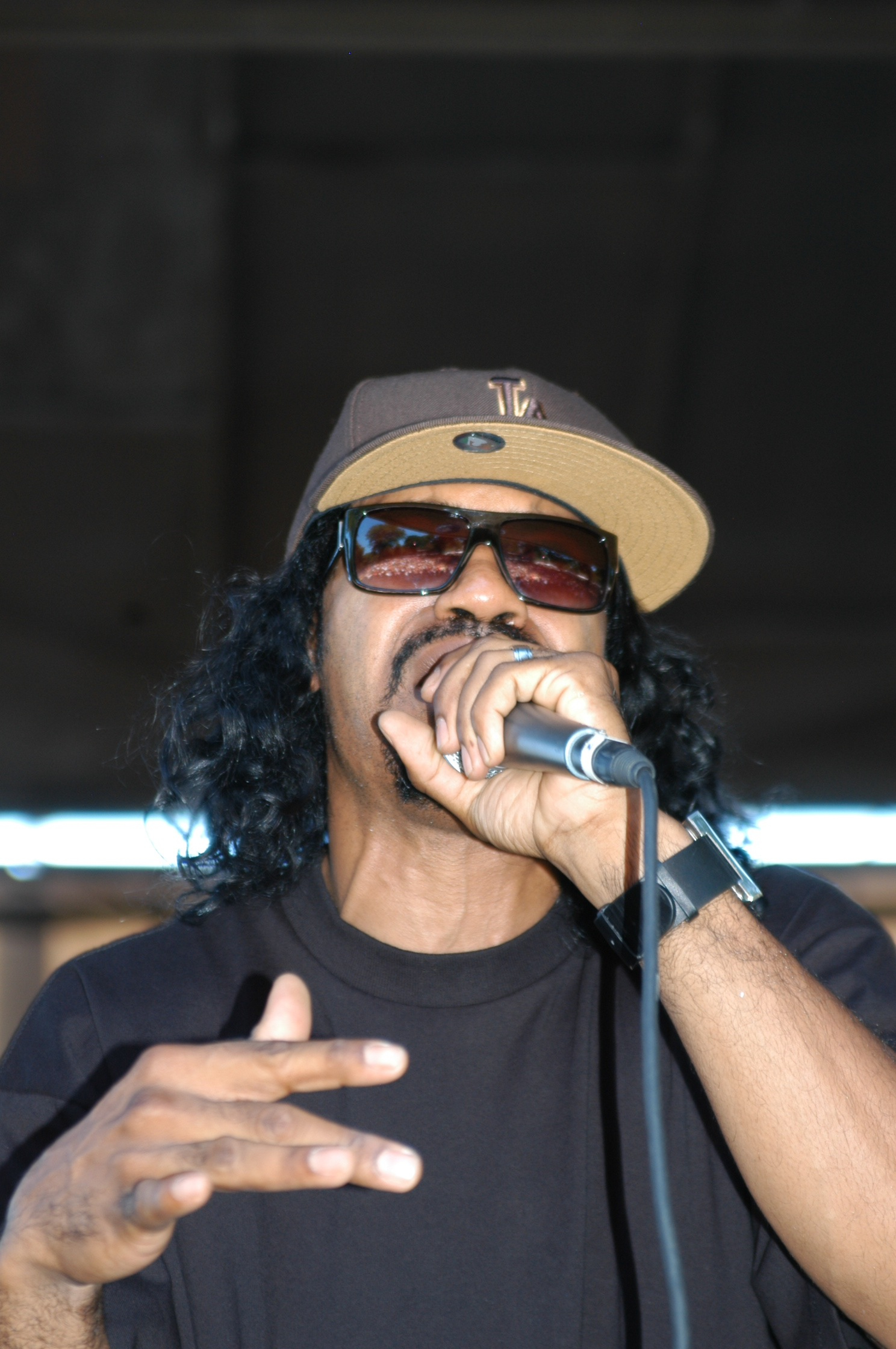

Background information
- Also known as: D-F, Garrett, Gemini Twin
- Born: Damon Garrett Riddick; June 15, 1971 (age 55)
- Origin: Pasadena, California, United States
- Genres: Funk, boogie, funktronica, R&B, g-funk, synth-pop
- Occupations: Musician, producer, DJ, vocalist
- Years active: 1988–present
- Labels: Stones Throw, Scion A/V, Glydezone, Funkmosphere, Music from Memory
- Website: stonesthrow.com/artist/damfunk/

Damon Garrett Riddick (born June 15, 1971), better known by his stage name Dam-Funk (stylized as DāM-FunK; pronounced "Dame Funk"), is an American funk musician, vocalist and producer from Pasadena, California. In 2007, Riddick signed with the L.A.-based record label Stones Throw Records.

== Partial discography ==
Solo albums

- Toeachizown (Stones Throw, 2009)
- Invite the Light (Stones Throw, 2015)
- Private Life (as Garrett) (Music from Memory, 2017)
- Above the Fray (Glydezone, 2021)

Collaborative albums

- Higher (with Steve Arrington) (Stones Throw, 2013)
- 7 Days of Funk (with Snoopzilla as 7 Days Of Funk) (Stones Throw, 2013)
- 7 Days Of Funk (Instrumentals) (with Snoopzilla as 7 Days Of Funk) (Stones Throw, 2014)
- Magic Hour (with Jay Worthy) (2024)

Extended plays

- LA Series #7 (with Computer Jay) (All City Dublin, 2010)
- InnaFocusedDaze (Scion/AV, 2011)
- I Don't Wanna Be A Star! (Stones Throw, 2012)
- STFU (Stones Throw, 2015)
- Architecture (Saft, 2016)
- Nite Funk (2016) (with Nite Jewel)
- STFU II (Glydezone, 2019)

Compilations

- Rhythm Trax Vol. 4 (Stones Throw, 2009)
- Adolescent Funk (Stones Throw, 2010)
- California (Welcome to Los Santos, 2015)

Singles

- "Burgundy City" (Stones Throw, 2008)
- "Japan Groove" (Stones Throw, 2009)
- "It's My Life" (Circle Star, 2009)
- "Let's Take Off (Far Away)" (Stones Throw, 2009)
- "Hood Pass Intact" (Stones Throw, 2010)
- "What's on Your Mind" (Tony Cook featuring Dam-Funk) (Stones Throw, 2010)
- "Faden Away" (Stones Throw, 2013) (with Snoopzilla as 7 Days of Funk)
- "Damn, dis-moi"/"Girlfriend" (Christine and the Queens featuring Dâm Funk) (Because Music, 2018)
