= D Train (group) =

American music duo

- Origin: New York City
- Genres: Post-disco, R&B, dance
- Years active: 1980–1985
- Labels: Prelude, Columbia/CBS
- Past members: James D-Train Williams; Hubert Eaves III

D Train (alternatively D-Train) was an American post-disco R&B duo consisting of James D-Train Williams and Hubert Eaves III. Formally active between 1980 and 1985, D Train had multiple hits on the Billboard Dance and R&B charts, and the top 30 of the UK Singles Chart, during the first half of the 1980s. Several of their hits have since been popularly used as samples in hip-hop songs since the 1990s.

== Career ==
The project was a collaborative effort between the band's namesake, James D-Train Williams, who was featured as the lead vocalist and songwriter, and Hubert Eaves III, a keyboardist, who performed the instrumentation on the recordings. Hailing from Brooklyn, New York City, Williams himself was a R&B-dance producer as well. He and Eaves met during high school and began performing together. Eaves would spend most of the 1970s as a member of the R&B band Mtume. However, by the 1980s, he and Williams had teamed up again. The group named itself "D Train" after a nickname Williams had acquired in high school.

D Train released its first single "You're the One for Me" in late 1981. The track became an instant success, hitting number 1 on the US Hot Dance Club Play chart that year; it was remixed and re-released successfully several times since and was contemporaneously covered by Paul Hardcastle with vocalist Kevin Henry in the United Kingdom. The duo's self-titled debut album (which prominently featured the "You're the One for Me" title on the front cover, and the album became known by this name) followed in early 1982, and several additional singles from this effort were successful on both the R&B and Dance charts, although they were not as popular as the debut hit. Among these tracks were "Keep On", which reached number 2 on the Dance chart, and a cover version of the Burt Bacharach and Hal David-penned "Walk On By", which owed more to the Isaac Hayes version than to Dionne Warwick's original recording.

In 1983, the band released its follow-up album, Music. The title track became another dance-floor anthem and nearly equaled the success of the group's debut single. Several other singles from the album were moderately successful.

In 1984, D Train had its only Billboard Hot 100 entry with "Something's on Your Mind," which climbed to number 79 and was later covered by Miles Davis on his album You're Under Arrest. The single also cracked the top five on the R&B chart, becoming the group's biggest hit in that market as well. The accompanying album, also titled Something's on Your Mind, found the band branching out into new musical territory, incorporating elements of reggae and more adult-oriented R&B into their music. Williams himself played acoustic guitar on a cover of Carole King's "So Far Away".

A greatest hits album titled You're the One for Me - The Very Best Of was released in the U.K. in 1985. An equivalent compilation was not released in the U.S. until the following year. Featured on this compilation was a remixed version of "You're the One for Me" that charted in the U.K. that same year. This version was remixed by Paul Hardcastle, who had previously issued a cover version of the song and, by 1985, had become well known for his own hit "19". Despite this success, the group disbanded that same year.

== D Train as a solo artist ==
Following the dissolution of the group, D Train continued on as a successful solo career. Although billed as a solo artist, however, he did continue to work with Eaves acting as a producer and key instrumentalist.

In 1986, D Train released his debut album, Miracles of the Heart, which featured a top ten R&B single, "Misunderstanding". The follow-up single, "Oh, How I Love You, Girl" also performed well in the R&B market.

His second album, In Your Eyes followed in 1988. The title track narrowly missed the R&B top ten, and one other single was also released.

== Legacy ==
D Train's albums were eventually re-released on CDs by Unidisc Music, which acquired Prelude Records and several other New York dance-music labels during the 1990s.

The Roland Corporation M-DC1 sound expansion module, released in 1995, features a vocal patch, "Aaaah! (169)", that is a sample of Williams's vocals in his 1986 solo single "Misunderstanding". The snippet, taken from the start of the line "I don’t want to lose you", was apparently used without Williams's knowledge or permission, and his identity as the source went uncredited and unknown until 2022. "Aaaah! (169)" was reportedly first used in Playa's 1998 single "Cheers 2 U" and has since become one of the most recognizable samples in hip-hop, appearing in songs such as Nelly's 2002 single "Dilemma", Migos's "Add It Up" from their 2014 album No Label 2, and Travis Scott's 2015 single "3500", among many others.

"You're the One for Me" has been remixed by Larry Levan and Shep Pettibone, and has also been sampled in "I Got Love" by DJ Kue, and "Girls" by the Prodigy from its album Always Outnumbered Never Outgunned. The Notorious B.I.G.'s "Sky's the Limit" interpolates part of "Keep On". Rapper Yo-Yo's "Iz It Still All Good" sampled "Something's on Your Mind," which featured Gerald LeVert, in 1998.

D Train contributed to the Pokémon anime's "PokéRAP" on the 1999 soundtrack album Pokémon 2.B.A. Master. In 1999, D Train did the backup vocal for "Eyes of a Child", a song written by Trey Parker and Performed by Michael McDonald for the film South Park Bigger Longer & Uncut. "You're the One for Me" appears in the 2013 video game Grand Theft Auto V, as one of the songs played by the in-game funk radio station Space 103.2.

Williams was hired as a DJ for Heart & Soul Channel 51 on the Sirius Satellite Radio service based in New York City from 2001 to 2008. In 2007, his performances of "My Funny Valentine" and Hot Chocolate's "You Sexy Thing" appeared on the soundtrack of the film Perfect Stranger.

== Discography ==
=== Studio albums ===
Year	Album	Label	Format	Peak chart positions		
Year	Album	Label	Format	US	US R&B	UK
1982	You're the One for Me	Prelude, Unidisc Records	LP, CD	128	16	72
1983	Music	Prelude, Unidisc Records	LP, CD	—	31	—
1984	Something's on Your Mind	Prelude, Unidisc Records	LP, CD	—	—	—
"—" denotes releases that did not chart or were not released in that territory.

=== Compilation albums ===
- You're the One for Me (The Very Best Of) (1985)
- The Best of "D" Train (1986, 1990)
- The Best of the 12" Mixes (1992)

=== Singles ===
Year	Single	Peak chart positions				Album
Year	Single	US Dance	US R&B	US Pop	UK	Album
1981	"You're the One for Me"	1	13	―	30	You're the One for Me
1982	"Keep On"	2	15	―	―	You're the One for Me
1982	"Walk on By"	45	42	―	44	You're the One for Me
1982	"D" Train's Theme"	45	―	―	―	You're the One for Me
1983	"Music"	12	20	―	23	Music
1983	"Keep Giving Me Love"	24	55	―	65	Music
1983	"The Shadow of Your Smile"	—	—	―	88	Music
1983	"Something's on Your Mind"	―	5	79	―	Something's on Your Mind
1984	"You're the Reason"	―	43	—	―	Something's on Your Mind
1984	"Thank You"	―	―	—	―	Something's on Your Mind
1985	"Just Another Night (Without Your Love)"	―	59	―	―	Non-album singles
1985	"You're the One for Me" (Paul Hardcastle remix)	―	―	―	15	Non-album singles
1985	"Music" (Paul Hardcastle remix)	―	―	―	62	Non-album singles
"—" denotes releases that did not chart or were not released in that territory.

== See also ==
- List of Billboard number-one dance club songs
- List of artists who reached number one on the U.S. Dance Club Songs chart
