= Boogie (genre) =

Music genre

- Stylistic origins: Post-disco; funk; soul; contemporary R&B; R&B
- Cultural origins: Late 1970s, US
- Typical instruments: Vocals; synthesizer; keyboards; bass guitar; bass synthesizer; sampler; sequencer; percussion (Latin, drums, drum machine)
- Derivative forms: Electro; house; nu-disco; city pop; pop kreatif

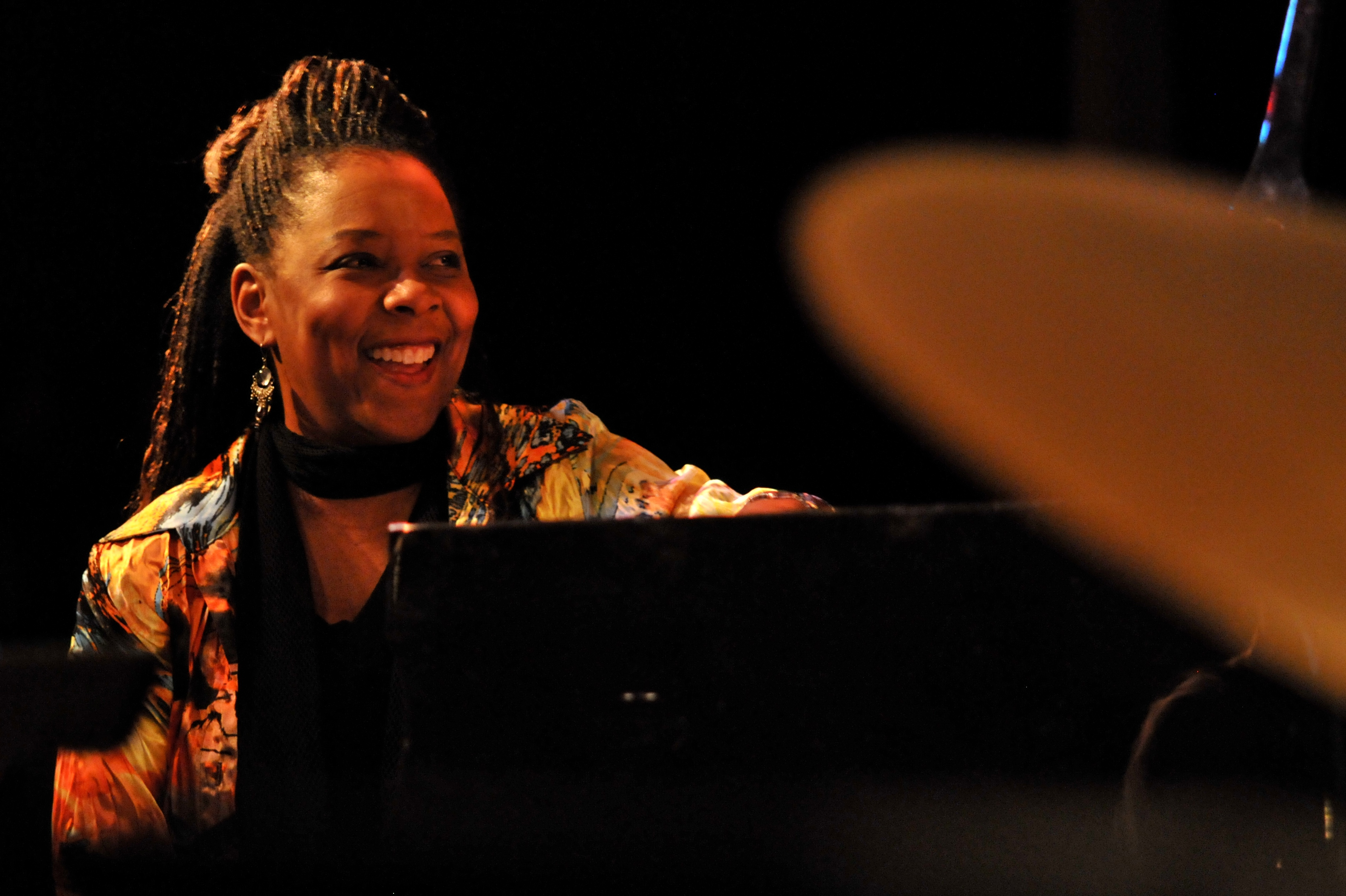
Patrice Rushen 2010

Boogie (sometimes called post-disco and electro-funk) is a rhythm and blues genre of electronic dance music with close ties to the post-disco style, that first emerged in the United States during the late 1970s to mid-1980s. The sound of boogie is defined by bridging acoustic and electronic musical instruments with emphasis on vocals and miscellaneous effects. It later evolved into electro and house music.

== Characteristics ==
Boogie, following the example of post-disco, generally lacks the four-on-the-floor beat, the "traditional" rhythm of disco music; instead, the genre has a strong accent on the second and fourth beats, and tempo generally in the 110 to 116 beats-per-minute range. Aside from applying certain technological and promotional aspects of new wave music and having been fairly exposed to its subgenre synthpop, boogie is, however, R&B-rooted and predominantly draws from funk music. Other influences from a completely different music landscape include jazz. Typical boogie tracks can be characterized by mid-tempo rhythm, prominent use of slap bass (electric—in the early 1980s—and/or synthetic—mid-1980s onwards), loud clapping sound, melodic chords and, obviously, synthesizers.

The term, coined by British DJs Norman Jay and Dez Parkes, had been used on eBay to refer a specific form of early-1980s dance music of African-American origin.

== History ==
=== 1920s–1930s: etymology ===
The first documented use of the word boogie is dated back to 1929. (Note: Oxford English Dictionary states that the term was used as early as 1913.) Boogie, as defined by Merriam-Webster Dictionary, is an occasion for dancing to the strongly rhythmic rock music that encourages people to dance. Earliest association of the word boogie was with blues and later rock and roll and rockabilly genres.

=== 1970s–1980s: current meaning ===
In the 1970s, the term was revitalized for disco and later post-disco subcultures. The term "boogie" was used in London to describe a form of African-American dance/funk music from the 1980s. The name boogie tended to be used as, although essentially used to describe disco records, the word disco had gained bad connotations by the early 1980s. Originally the word boogie could be found in 1970s funk, soul, R&B and disco records, most notably:

- "Boogie Down" (1974) by Eddie Kendricks
- "Jungle Boogie" (1974) and "Spirit of the Boogie" (1975) by Kool and the Gang
- "The Bertha Butt Boogie" (1975) by The Jimmy Castor Bunch
- "Boogie Child" (1976) by the Bee Gees
- "Boogie Fever" (1976) by The Sylvers
- "Boogie Nights" (1977) by Heatwave
- "Yes Sir, I Can Boogie" (1977) by Baccara
- "I'm Your Boogie Man" (1977) and "Boogie Shoes" (1978) by KC and the Sunshine Band
- "Boogie Oogie Oogie" (1978) by A Taste of Honey
- "Aqua Boogie" (1978) by Parliament
- "Blame It on the Boogie" (1978) by The Jacksons
- "Boogie Wonderland" (1979) by Earth, Wind & Fire

Kashif called to be one of the pioneers of the genre. His single "I Just Gotta Have You (Lover Turn Me On)" from the 1983 debut album Kashif helped to define the early 1980s boogie sound. Also such 1980s tracks like "Wake Up" (Bohannon), "Act Like You Know"(Fat Larry's Band), "Give Me the Night" (George Benson, 1980), "Boogie's Gonna Get Ya" (Rafael Cameron, 1981), "I'm in Love" (Evelyn King, 1981), "You're the One for Me" (D. Train, 1981), "Don't Make Me Wait" (Peech Boys, 1982) or "Break Dance – Electric Boogie" (West Street Mob, 1983) helped define the musical style of boogie.

Throughout the 1980s, various boogie artists began experimenting with the heavy bass which anticipated the roots of house. They include Hamilton Bohannon, D. Train, and Sharon Redd. While some record producers, such as François Kevorkian and Larry Levan, were polishing and extending the limits of urban-oriented boogie, others like Arthur Baker and John "Jellybean" Benitez drew their influences from European and Japanese technopop music. The latter approach paved the way for electro, and subsequently, freestyle music.

Boogie had a popular following within London's underground scene, often based around nightclubs and club DJs due to a lack of mainstream radio support. Boogie records were mostly imported from the U.S. and were sometimes labeled as "electro-funk" or "disco-funk."

Boogie, synth-pop, and electro-funk produced in Africa, later broadly termed afro-boogie, took on certain regional characteristics as the 1980s progressed, particularly in Nigeria and South Africa. In Nigeria, there was a surge of Lagos-based artists whose local styles heavily utilized falsetto vocals, electronic percussion, slap bass, and prominent synthesizers. A pioneer in this style of production was the Cameroonian-born (but Lagos-based) Nkono Teles, credited on over 100 Nigerian boogie records. Today, these recordings are characterized by their rawer or even lo-fi sound. In South Africa, afro-boogie significantly influenced the emergence of the popular bubblegum (or township) style of pop music.

=== 2010s: revitalization ===
Much later in the 2000s and early 2010s, indietronica groups and artists such as James Pants, Juice Aleem, Sa-Ra Creative Partners had been influenced by the sounds of boogie and 1980s electronic music in general. Chromeo, a Canadian duo, published a boogie-oriented album called She's in Control in 2004. Dâm-Funk, another boogie-influenced artist hailing from Los Angeles, California, published an album Toeachizown in 2009.

During the mid to late 2010s, boogie was part of the nu-disco and future funk renaissance, the former a primarily European artists-led EDM phenomenon, fusing French house with American 1970s disco and 1980s boogie, and 1980s European electronic dance music styles, the latter connected to the vaporwave scene. Bruno Mars ("24K Magic") was one of the more mainstream 2010s artists influenced by boogie.

== Electro ==
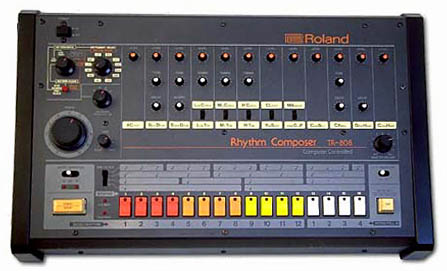
The Roland TR-808 drum machine was often used in Electro music.

Among electro-boogie (later shortened to electro) pioneers include Zapp, D. Train, Sinnamon and other post-disco/boogie musicians; especially those influenced by new wave and synthpop acts like Human League or Gary Numan, combined with the R&B sound of Herbie Hancock and George Clinton. As the electronic progression continued, acoustic instruments such as bass guitar were replaced by Japanese-made synthesizers and most notably by iconic drum machines like Roland TR-808. Early uses of this drum machine include several Yellow Magic Orchestra tracks in 1980–1981, the 1982 track "Planet Rock" by Afrikaa Bambaataa, and the 1982 song "Sexual Healing" by Marvin Gaye.

About electro origins, Greg Wilson argues:

It was all about stretching the boundaries that had begun to stifle black music, and its influences lay not only with German technopop wizards Kraftwerk, the acknowledged forefathers of pure electro, plus British futurist acts like the Human League and Gary Numan, but also with a number of pioneering black musicians. Major artists like Miles Davis, Sly Stone, Herbie Hancock, Stevie Wonder, legendary producer Norman Whitfield and, of course, George Clinton and his P Funk brigade, would all play their part in shaping this new sound via their innovative use of electronic instruments during the [1970s] (and as early as the late [1960s] in Miles Davis's case).
