= Prelude Records =

American record label

- Parent company: Unidisc
- Founded: 1976
- Founder: Marvin Schlachter
- Defunct: 1986
- Status: Defunct
- Genre: Funk; soul; boogie; dance; disco
- Country of origin: U.S.
- Location: New York City

Prelude Records was a New York–based independent record label that was active from 1977 to 1986. At one time, François Kevorkian held an A&R position at Prelude. The label's owner was Marvin Schlachter, and his business partner was Stan Hoffman, who had worked with him at Janus Records, and later Pye/ATV. Hoffman eventually became a noted boxing promotor.

== History ==
Prelude was first launched in 1977, renamed from Pye International Records, a US division of UK-based Pye Records which had begun in 1974. The name was derived from the music group Prelude, which recorded for Pye at the time. At the outset, Prelude's LP and 45 catalogue numbers were the same as had begun under Pye (US), with the prefix changed from PYE- to PRL-. For a very short period at the start, Pye's then-parent, ATV Music, owned Prelude. It first made its small release with a large name called JUMBO, which spawned a minor hit with "Turn On To Love".

As disco music declined, Prelude was one of the few disco labels to survive its demise. In 1981 they pioneered the mastermix, with Shep Pettibone's "Kiss Mastermix 2x12". Having recruited Kevorkian, the label was able to focus on remixes; to change up an existing song by altering it slightly. "Disco Circus" by Martin Circus (1979) was and still is a cult classic, but failed to make significant sales according to Michael Gomes who began working for Prelude in 1979.

Prelude's biggest hits included "In the Bush" by Musique (1978), "Come to Me" by France Joli (1979), "A Little Bit of Jazz" by the Nick Straker Band and "Must Be the Music" by Secret Weapon (1981).

After its closure in 1986, Prelude's back catalogue was purchased by Unidisc.

== Artists ==
- 9th Creation
- Gayle Adams
- Jocelyn Brown
- CD III
- Constellation Orchestra
- D-Train
- Gerald Mallory
- Jeanette "Lady" Day
- Hi-Gloss
- Inner Life
- France Joli
- L.A.X.
- Lorraine Johnson (1977, 78)
- Macho
- Dianne Marie
- Dorothy Moore (1985)
- Musique
- Nick Straker Band
- Passion
- Peter Jacques Band
- Sharon Redd
- Vicki Sue Robinson
- Saturday Night Band
- Secret Weapon
- Sticky Fingers
- The Strikers
- Linda Taylor
- Bobby Thurston
- Unique
- Unlimited Touch
- Theo Vaness
- Wuf Ticket

== See also ==
- Salsoul Records
- West End Records
- List of record labels
