= François Kevorkian =

French DJ (born 1954)

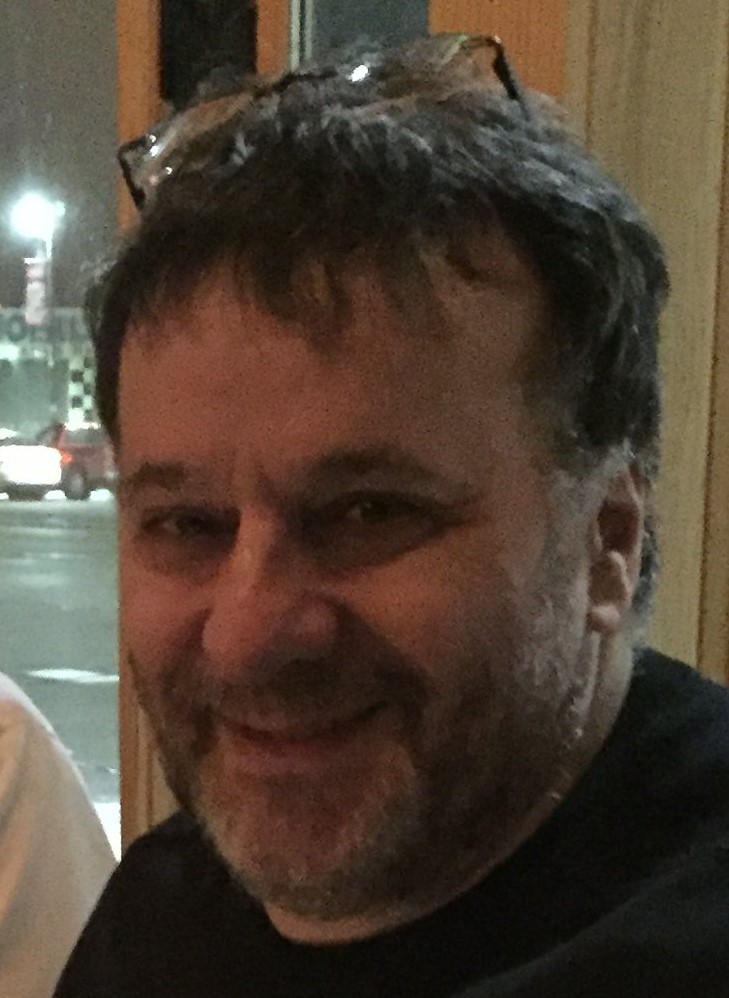
- Kevorkian in 2017

Background information
- Also known as: François K.
- Born: 10 January 1954 (age 72); Rodez, Midi-Pyrénées, France
- Genres: Post-disco; house
- Occupations: DJ; record producer; remixer; record label owner

François Kevorkian (French pronunciation: [fʁɑ̃swa kevɔʁkjɑ̃]; born 10 January 1954), also known by the stage name François K, is a French DJ, producer, remixer and record label owner of Armenian descent and based in the United States of America, who started his career DJing in clubs such as the Paradise Garage and Studio 54. Kevorkian has produced and remixed work by a diverse range of musicians including the Smiths, Adam Ant, Kraftwerk, Pet Shop Boys, Depeche Mode, Diana Ross, Gloria Estefan and U2, and is considered one of the forefathers of house music.

== Biography ==
François Kevorkian (Armenian: Ֆրանսուա Գեւորգեան) was born and raised in France, with Armenian heritage. He played the drums in his adolescent years.

He moved to the United States in 1975. At that time the competition to be a drummer was very high, so around 1976 he became a DJ in underground clubs in New York City. DJing soon became his full-time occupation, including some work at more commercial venues such as the club New York, New York in 1977. He taught himself tape editing and started making disco medleys, such as Rare Earth's "Happy Song". He was offered a role in A&R for a nascent dance independent record label, Prelude Records, which allowed him to go into the studio and do remixes. His first remix, of "In the Bush" by Musique, became a club and radio hit, and was followed by further hit remixes including "You're The One For Me' and "Keep On" by D-Train, and "Beat the Street" by Sharon Redd. He left Prelude in 1982, and in the same year had the most #1 singles on Billboard's Dance Music Chart, including his remixes of tracks such as "Situation" by Yazoo, and "Go Bang" by Dinosaur L.

Kevorkian also performed as a DJ at Club Zanzibar in Newark, New Jersey during the 1980s, home to the "Jersey Sound" brand of deep house or garage house.

During this time he began building his own recording studio, Axis Studios, in the same building as Studio 54. The studio soon became a major commercial operation. He stopped DJing around 1983 to focus on recording and mixing full-time, but started again in early 1990. Due to the new international popularity of dance music, he gained exposure overseas and began performing abroad. He toured Japan with Larry Levan in 1992 on the 'Harmony Tour' before Levan's death in November that year, and also appeared at London's Ministry of Sound and Fabric, Japan's Spacelab Yellow, Ibiza's Pacha and Space, Italy's Angels of Love and many large festivals.

In 1995, he started an eclectic independent record label, Wave Music, on which he released his own work, including the FK-EP, as well as records by Abstract Truth, Floppy Sounds and other electronic music releases. In 1996, with partner John Davis, he launched Body&SOUL, a weekly party held every Sunday afternoon at Club Vinyl, 6 Hubert Street, playing alongside co-resident DJs Joaquin 'Joe' Claussell and Danny Krivit. The 'Body&SOUL' sound, a soulful mix of organic and spiritual dance music, led to the release of a compilation series by the same name.

He continued his career as an artist, returning to a more electronic sound, and the release of his Sonar Music set in 2002 marked an edgier and more futuristic style, more closely related to Techno and Dub than the House sound he was identified with as a DJ. In 2002, he also started touring with Derrick May, playing sets together as the Cosmic Twins at Berlin's Tresor, Manchester's Sankey's Soap and London's Fabric. Kevorkian released a new compilation CD in 2006, entitled Frequencies.

In April 2003, he started a residency at a new weekly Monday night event in New York City called "Deep Space NYC", an eclectic night focused on dub music and related styles. He mixed Deep Space NYC Vol. 1, a compilation featuring several of his own productions, along with Jamaican dub reggae and roots reggae artists Mutabaruka and U-Roy. Kevorkian's work with U-Roy was co-produced in a discomix style with British roots reggae and dubplate artist, Russ Disciple of The Disciples. He also provided remixes for Moloko, Yoko Ono, Cesária Évora, Nina Simone, as well as for his own label. In 2005, he was inducted into the Dance Music Hall of Fame as both a remixer and DJ.

Kevorkian has subsequently performed at events around the world, including Midem (France), Sónar (Spain), Global Gathering (UK), Exit Festival (Serbia), The Big Chill (UK), Bestival (UK), The NYC Downlow at Glastonbury (UK) and Electric Picnic (Ireland).

== Wave Music ==
Wave Music logo

In 1995, François Kevorkian founded Wave Music, an independent dance music record label headquartered in New York City. Its catalog features a wide spectrum of musical styles by many different artists, as well as several compilation series, such as Body&SOUL-NYC, Deep&Sexy, Bossa Mundo, and Frequencies. Over the years, Wave Music has launched a variety of imprints (sub-labels) such as Wavetec, clicktracks, Wave Classics, Streetwave, and Deep Space Media. As well, it distributes other independent labels such as Chez Music and Bombay Records.

Some of the artists that has been signed to Wave are: Abstract Truth, Boyd Jarvis, Fonda Rae, Kevin Aviance.

== Selected discography ==
=== FK-EP (Wave Music) 1996 ===
- "Time and Space" (Wave Music) 1998
- "Capricorn" (Wave Music) 2000
- "Awakening" (Wave Music) 2002
- "Enlightenment" (Wave Music) 2002
- "Road of Life" (Deep Space Media) 2007

=== Compilations ===
- Renaissance: The Masters Series – Part 19 (Renaissance) 2013
- Masterpiece: Created By François K (Ministry of Sound) 2008
- Frequencies – 2 x CD – (Wavetec) 2006
- Deep Space NYC (vol. 1) (Deep Space Media/Wave Music) 2005
- Live at Sonar (SonarMusic) 2003
- Body&SOUL NYC (vol. 1, 2, 3, 4, 5) (Wave Music) 1998–2007
- Deep & Sexy (vol.1) (Wave Music) 2001
- Choice: A Collection of Classics (Azuli) 2002
- Essential Mix – François K (London/Ffrr) 2000

=== Video game DJ Mix ===
- 'Electro-Choc', the Dance radio station in Grand Theft Auto IV (Rockstar Games) 2008

=== As a producer ===
- Snake Charmer Jah Wobble, The Edge, Holger Czukay, and Jaki Liebezeit (Island Records) 1983
- May the Cube Be With You Dolby's Cube 1985
- Species Deceases Midnight Oil (Columbia Records) 1985
- We're on the Move Jamaica Girls (Sire) 1985
- "Strong Enough" Loleatta Holloway (Active Records) 1992 co-produced with Yvone Turner and Alan Friedman
- "Got To Be in Love" Barbara Mendes (Wave Music) 2003 co-produced with Eric Kupper
- "Rootsman" U-Roy (Deep Space Media) 2005 co-produced with Russ Disciple of The Disciples (band)

=== As a mix producer ===
- 'You Got What It Takes' (Edited Version) by Bobby Thurston (Prelude Records) 1980 (edited by François K, mixed by François K, Willie Lester, Rodney Brown)
- 'So Red the Rose' Arcadia (EMI Records) 1985
- 'Electric Café' Kraftwerk (EMI Records, non-USA; Warner Bros. Records, USA) 1986
- 'Violator' Depeche Mode (Mute, non-USA; Sire/Reprise/Warner Bros., USA) 1990 (credited as Francois "Kervorkian", a typographical error)
- 'Erasure' Erasure (Mute) 1995
- 'Blondosaurus' Rebecca (Sony Japan) 1989

=== As a remixer ===
- "In the Bush" Musique (Prelude) 1978
- "I Hear Music in the Streets" Unlimited Touch (Prelude) 1980
- "You're the One for Me" / "Keep On" / "Music" / "Walk On By" / "Misunderstanding" D-Train (Prelude) 1981–1983
- "Beat the Street" / "Never Give You Up" / "Send Your Love" / "Can You Handle It" Sharon Redd 1982–1983
- "Body Music" The Strikers (Prelude) 1981 (co-mixed with Larry Levan)
- "Let's Go Dancin'" Sparque (West End) 1981
- "Go Bang" Dinosaur L (Sleeping Bag) 1981
- "Kiss Me" Tin Tin (U.S. Remix) (Sire WEA Records) 1982
- "Situation" Yazoo (Mute) 1982
- "Enjoy what you do (WHAM! rap)" WHAM! (COLUMBIA) 1982
- "Two Hearts Beat As One" / "New Year's Day" U2 (Island) 1983
- "This Charming Man" The Smiths (Rough Trade) 1983
- "Dissidents" Thomas Dolby (EMI Records Ltd.) 1984
- "Tour de France" Kraftwerk (EMI – Warner Bros.) 1984
- "Lucky in Love" / "Just Another Night" Mick Jagger (Columbia) 1984
- "Blue Light (12" Mix)" David Gilmour 1984
- "Solid (As A Rock)" Ashford & Simpson (Capitol) 1984
- "Sleepless" King Crimson 1984
- "Eaten Alive" Diana Ross (Hot Extended Dance Mix) 1985 co-mixed with Ron St. Germain
- "Chain Reaction" Diana Ross (Special New Mix) 1985 co-mixed with Ron St. Germain
- "Experience" Diana Ross (Special Dance Mix) 1985 co-mixed with Ron St. Germain
- "Zoolookologie" Jean Michel Jarre (Disques Dreyfus France) 1985
- "Perfect Way" Scritti Politti UK 12" single ((Version)) (Virgin) 1985
- "Shiny Toys" Joni Mitchell 12" single Version from the album Dog Eat Dog 1985
- "Apollo 9 (Francois Kevorkian 'Splashdown' 12" Mix)" Adam Ant 1985
- "Why Can't I Be You" / "Japanese Dream" / "Hot, Hot, Hot" / "Hey You!" / The Cure (Fiction-Elektra) 1985–1990
- "The Telephone Call" Kraftwerk (EMI/Warner Bros.) 1987 co-mixed with Kraftwerk and Ron St. Germain
- "Dirty Looks" Diana Ross (Remix Version) 1987 co-mixed with Ron St. Germain
- "Don't You Want Me" Jody Watley (MCA) 1987
- "Rent" Pet Shop Boys (Parlophone/EMI) 1987
- "My Bag" (dancing mix) Lloyd Cole and the Commotions (single b-side, Polydor) 1987
- "Forever Tonight" (Extended CD Mix) Jan Hammer (from the MCA album Escape from Television) 1987
- "Here To Go" (Little Dub) Cabaret Voltaire (Parlophone/EMI) 1987
- "My Bag" (dancing mix)/"My Bag" (dancing dub) Lloyd Cole and the Commotions (Capitol Records) 1988
- "Personal Jesus" / "Enjoy the Silence" / "Policy of Truth" / "World in My Eyes" / "Sea of Sin" Depeche Mode (Mute / Sire / Reprise) 1990
- "Radioactivity" Kraftwerk (EMI/Elektra) 1991
- "Higher Love" Depeche Mode (Mute/Sire/Reprise) 1994 co-mixed with Goh Hotoda
- "Get Another Plan" Abstract Truth (Wave Music) 1996
- "Tom & Joyce" Vai Minha Tristeza (Delabel) 1997
- "Tout est bleu" Ame Strong (Wave) 1998
- "Sangue De Beirona" Cesária Évora (Lusafrica / Wave) 1999
- "Expo Remix" Kraftwerk (EMI) 2000 co-mixed with Rob Rives
- "Hunter" Dido (Arista) 2001
- "Swollen" Bent (Ministry of Sound) 2001
- "Josephine" Chris Rea (Warner Bros.) 2001 co-mixed with Eric Kupper
- "La La Land" Green Velvet (Music Man) 2002 co-mixed with Rob Rives
- "Community" Audio Soul Project (NRK) 2002 co-mixed with Rob Rives
- "Forever More" Moloko (Echo) 2003 co-mixed with Eric Kupper
- "Walking on Thin Ice" Yoko Ono (Twisted) 2003 co-mixed with Eric Kupper
- "Aborigine's Jam" Cirque du Soleil (Cirque du Soleil) 2003 co-mixed with Eric Kupper
- "Aero Dynamik" Kraftwerk (EMI – Astralwerks) 2004
- "Welcome Dub" Herbest Moon (Soundscape) 2004
- "Disco Infiltrator" LCD Soundsystem (EMI UK) 2005
- "Ride a White Horse" Goldfrapp (Mute) 2005 co-mixed with Eric Kupper
- "Talk" Coldplay (EMI UK) 2005
- "Here Comes the Sun" Nina Simone (Columbia) 2006
- "The Picture" Hubert Kah (Soundcolours) 2011
- "Cascades" (François K Mix) Mark Barrott 2017

=== As an editor ===
- "Happy Song" (bootleg) Rare Earth (labelled as: "Happy Song And Dance")
