= When Disco Ruled the World =

- Genre: Music documentary
- Composers: Deborah Harry; Giorgio Moroder; Chris Stein
- Country of origin: United States
- Original language: English
- No. of episodes: 1

Production
- Cinematography: Sebastian Jungwirth
- Running time: 60 mins.

Original release
- Network: VH1
- Release: March 2005

When Disco Ruled the World is a music documentary that aired on VH1 in 2005.

== Overview ==
The series documented the impact that disco music had on popular culture in the 1970s. The show featured several disco innovators and people related to the culture including:

- Marty Angelo - Producer, Disco Step-by-Step
- Charlie Anzalone - Club DJ
- Maurice Brahms - Club owner, Infinity
- Harry Wayne Casey - Lead singer of KC and the Sunshine Band
- Joe Causi - Radio DJ
- Carmen D’alessio - Co-Founder of Studio 54
- Billy Fajardo - Dancer
- Michael Fesco - Club owner of Flamingo
- Gloria Gaynor - Singer
- Karen Lynn Gorney - Actress, Saturday Night Fever
- Merv Griffin - Creator of Dance Fever
- Debbie Harry - Lead singer of Blondie
- Janice-Marie Johnson - Singer with A Taste of Honey
- Baird Jones - Studio 54 doorman
- David Mancuso - Club owner, The Loft
- Steve Marcus - Producer of Disco Magic television show
- Giorgio Moroder - Record producer
- Tom Moulton - Record producer/mixer
- Michael Musto - Journalist
- Richard Long - Richard Long and Associates [sound system designer for Studio 54, Paradise Garage and many other major clubs]
- Richard Notar - Studio 54 owner Steve Rubell’s driver
- Anita Pointer - Singer with the Pointer Sisters
- Nile Rodgers - Producer and member of Chic
- Nicky Siano - Club Deejay
- Annie Sprinkle, Ph.D. - Adult Entertainer
- Henry Stone - Founder of TK Records
- Deney Terrio - Host of Dance Fever
- Maurice White - Founder and lead singer of Earth, Wind & Fire
