= A Taste of Honey (disambiguation) =

A Taste of Honey is a play written by Shelagh Delaney.

A Taste of Honey or Taste of Honey may refer to:

== Music ==
- A Taste of Honey (band), an American disco music group
- A Taste of Honey (album), by A Taste of Honey
- A Taste of Honey, an album by James Booker
- "A Taste of Honey" (song), a 1960s pop standard, originally written for a US production of the play

== Other uses ==
- A Taste of Honey (film), 1961, adaptation of the play
- A Taste of Honey (novella), a 2016 LGBT fantasy romance novella by Kai Ashante Wilson
- Mitsu no Aji: A Taste of Honey, a Japanese television drama series

== See also ==
- A Taste for Honey, a 1941 novel by H. F. Heard
