= Creating Karma =

- Directed by: Jill Wisoff
- Written by: Jill Wisoff; Carol Lee Sirugo
- Starring: Karen Lynn Gorney
- Cinematography: Carter Bissell
- Music by: Joel Diamond
- Release date: October 2006 (Coney Island)
- Country: United States
- Language: English

Creating Karma is a 2006 American screwball comedy film directed by Jill Wisoff about an uptight, New York fashion editor who becomes a poet after losing her job, moving in with her eccentric new-age therapist sister, and meeting Mr. Wrong, owner of a local poets' café.

Independently produced, the film kicked off its film festival run at the 2006 Coney Island Film Festival. The film garnered a Best Feature Comedy win in Los Angeles at the 2008 Broad Humor Film Festival. It screened in New Orleans at the 2008 TOMI film festival and in Notting Hill, London as an official selection of the 2008 Portobello Film Festival. It had its U.S. theatrical premiere on October 16, 2009 in Los Angeles.

The original screenplay was co-written by Jill Wisoff and Carol Lee Sirugo, co-produced by David Wright, and stars Karen Lynn Gorney, Carol Lee Sirugo, Jill Wisoff, Joe Grifasi, Rahad Coulter-Stevenson, Roland Sands, Jeremy Ebenstein, Jennifer Lee Mitchell and Riana Hershenfeld; with musical score by Joel Diamond, cinematography by Carter Bissell, production design by Kathleen Muldoon and costumes by Nina Simich.

== Cast ==
- Karen Lynn Gorney
- Carol Lee Sirugo
- Jill Wisoff
- Joe Grifasi
- Rahad Coulter-Stevenson
- Roland Sands
- Jeremy Ebenstein
- Jennifer Lee Mitchell
- Riana Hershenfeld
