= Sukiyaki (song) =

1961 song by Kyu Sakamoto

"Ue o Muite Arukō"
- Japanese cover

Single by Kyu Sakamoto

from the album Sukiyaki and Other Japanese Hits (US)
- Language: Japanese
- English title: "Sukiyaki"
- B-side: "Ano ko no namae wa nanten kana"
- Released: 15 October 1961
- Recorded: 1961
- Genre: Kayōkyoku; orchestral pop
- Length: 3:05
- Label: Toshiba-EMI (Japan); Capitol/EMI (US and Canada); His Master's Voice (UK)
- Composer: Hachidai Nakamura
- Lyricist: Rokusuke Ei
- Producer: Kōji Kusano

Kyu Sakamoto singles chronology
"Kyū-chan Ondo (Sore ga Ukiyo to Iu Mono sa)" (1961)	"Ue o Muite Arukō" (1961)	"Model Girl" (1961)

Audio sample
- file; help

"Ue o Muite Arukō" (Japanese: 上を向いて歩こう; "I Look Up as I Walk"), alternatively titled "Sukiyaki", is a song by Japanese crooner Kyu Sakamoto, first released in Japan in 1961. The song topped the charts in a number of countries, including the US Billboard Hot 100 in 1963. The song grew to become one of the world's best-selling singles of all time, selling over 13 million copies worldwide.

== Composition ==
"Ue o Muite Arukō" (pronounced [ɯe o mɯite aɾɯkoꜜː]) was written by lyricist Rokusuke Ei and composer Hachidai Nakamura. The lyrics tell the story of a man who looks up while he is walking so that his tears will not fall, with the verses describing his memories and feelings. Ei wrote the lyrics while walking home from participating in the 1960 Anpo protests against the US–Japan Security Treaty, expressing his frustration and dejection at the failed efforts to stop the treaty. However, the lyrics were purposely generic so that they might refer to any lost love.

The English-language lyrics of the version recorded by A Taste of Honey are not a direct translation of the original Japanese lyrics, but instead a completely different set of lyrics arranged to a similar basic melody.

== Cultural significance ==
The song spent three weeks at the top of the American Billboard charts in June 1963. It has been described as a metaphor for the emerging post-World War II global expansion of Japan onto the world scene.

== English title ==
In Anglophone countries, the song is best known under the alternative title "Sukiyaki", the name of a Japanese hot pot dish with cooked beef. The word sukiyaki does not appear in the song's lyrics, nor does it have any connection to them; it was used only because it was short, catchy, recognizably Japanese, and more familiar to English speakers. A Newsweek columnist compared this renaming to issuing "Moon River" in Japan under the title "Beef Stew".

Well-known English-language cover versions with altogether different lyrics often go by the alternative name or something completely different, including "My First Lonely Night" by Jewel Akens in 1966, and "Sukiyaki" by A Taste of Honey in 1980 (see below). The song has also been recorded in other languages.

== Commercial performance ==
In Japan, "Ue o Muite Arukō" topped the Popular Music Selling Record chart in the Japanese magazine Music Life for three months, and was ranked as the number one song of 1961 in Japan.

In the US, "Sukiyaki" topped the Billboard Hot 100 chart in 1963, one of the few non-English songs to have done so, and the first in a non-European language. It was the only single by an Asian artist to top the Hot 100 until the 2020 release of "Dynamite" by the South Korean band BTS. "Sukiyaki" also peaked at number eighteen on the Billboard R&B chart, and spent five weeks at number one on the Middle of the Road chart.

Sakamoto's follow-up to "Sukiyaki", "China Nights (Shina no Yoru)", charted in 1963 at number 58. That was the last song by an artist from Japan to reach the US pop chart for 16 years, until the female duo Pink Lady had a top-40 hit in 1979 with its English-language song "Kiss in the Dark".

Internationally, the song is one of the best-selling singles of all time, having sold over 13 million copies worldwide.

== Charts ==
Chart (1961–1963)	Peak position
Australia (Kent Music Report)	1
Canada (CHUM)	4
Japan (Music Life)	1
New Zealand (Lever Hit Parade)	1
Norway (VG-lista)	1
UK Singles (Official Charts)	6
US Billboard Hot 100	1
US Adult Contemporary (Billboard)	1
US Hot R&B/Hip-Hop Songs (Billboard)	18
West Germany (GfK)	2

== Certifications ==
Region	Certification	Certified units/sales
Japan (RIAJ) digital	Gold	100,000^{*}
^{*} Sales figures based on certification alone.

== Legacy ==
An instrumental version of the song was played by NASA over the radio for the Gemini VII astronauts as mood music, thereby becoming one of the first pieces of music sent to humans in space.

On 16 March 1999, Japan Post issued a stamp that commemorated the song. The stamp is listed in the Scott Standard Postage Stamp Catalogue as Japan number 2666 with a face value of 50 yen.

In the wake of 11 March, 2011 Tōhoku earthquake and tsunami, the Suntory beverage company released several commercials that included this song (as well as "Miagete goran yoru no hoshi o"), with 71 actors and singers singing parts of the song, followed by the title caption "ue wo muite arukou", roughly translated as "let's walk with our heads up", as a way to motivate Japanese people to "keep moving forward towards tomorrow", giving a message of hope. This song was also heard in the Studio Ghibli film From Up on Poppy Hill of the same year.

On 15 October 2020, Google honored the song and singer Kyu Sakamoto with a Google Doodle on the 59th anniversary of his first album.

In the summer of 2021, the song was performed in remix during the closing ceremony of the 2020 Olympic Games in Tokyo (which had been postponed due to the COVID-19 pandemic restrictions).

== A Taste of Honey version ==
"Sukiyaki"

Single by A Taste of Honey

from the album Twice as Sweet
- B-side: "Don't You Lead Me On"
- Released: March 1981
- Recorded: 1980
- Genre: Quiet storm
- Length: 3:44
- Label: Capitol; EMI
- Songwriters: Hachidai Nakamura; Rokusuke Ei; Janice-Marie Johnson (English lyrics – uncredited)
- Producer: George Duke

A Taste of Honey singles chronology
"Rescue Me" (1980)	"Sukiyaki" (1981)	"I'll Try Something New" (1982)

=== Background ===
A Taste of Honey vocalist Janice-Marie Johnson would recall how at age nine she had heard Kyu Sakamoto's "Sukiyaki" on the radio in the summer of 1963 and said: "Mom! Buy me this record!", as despite not understanding the lyrics she was deeply moved by the song. Constantly playing the single, Johnson phonetically learned its lyrics and taught them to her sister, with the pair participating in neighborhood talent shows singing "Sukiyaki" while performing their approximation of an Oriental dance number. Years later, after A Taste of Honey had scored their 1978 number-one hit "Boogie Oogie Oogie", Johnson heard the Linda Ronstadt hit remake of Smokey Robinson and the Miracles' "Ooo Baby Baby" on her car radio causing Johnson to realize that remaking a 1960s hit could be a good career move for A Taste of Honey, with Johnson's obvious choice for the remake being her beloved "Sukiyaki". Johnson contacted the song's Japanese lyricist Rokusuke Ei who provided her with a literal translation of what he had written. As this translation did not yield complete sentences in English, Johnson endeavored to write a new set of lyrics she felt would capture the spirit of the song. To Johnson, it seemed the song's original lyrics had 3 possible interpretations: as the mindset of a man facing execution; as someone trying to be optimistic despite life's trials; or as the story of an ended love affair. Johnson decided: "me being the hopeless romantic that I am, I decided to write about a love gone bad."

According to Johnson, when Cecil Hale, vice-president of Capitol Records, heard her sing the lyrics she had written for "Sukiyaki" in the slow balladic style she envisioned for the track, "he said, 'absolutely not! Black people don't want to hear Japanese music.' I was stunned [having been] so sure he would like it. I looked at him and I said 'Last time I looked in a mirror I was black and I want to hear it.'" Producer George Duke, who was assigned to produce the upcoming A Taste of Honey album Twice as Sweet, shared Hale's lack of enthusiasm. Duke recalled: "'Man, what am I going to do with "Sukiyaki"?' I thought [Johnson] was crazy, but I said 'If that's what she wants to do, I'll do it.'" Johnson would recall Duke, "thought we could do a kind of uptempo version [but] I [saw] it as a love ballad, which is how it was done. [Duke] did a fantastic arrangement." Duke replied, "we did the song and had Clare Fischer do the string arrangement and brought June [Kuramoto] in to give it a Japanese flavor" – Kuramoto being a koto player whom Duke knew from the jazz band Hiroshima – "We added an R&B section, and that was it. It was a simple tune I never thought would become a hit. To this day, I can't believe it was as big a record as it was."

Cecil Hale remained resistant to the track: as late as the master for Twice as Sweet being placed on the disc cutter "Sukiyaki" was omitted, the track only being added to Twice as Sweet before the album's August 1980 release after some eleventh hour negotiations between Johnson and Capitol Records, most essentially that Johnson be disallowed credit or royalties for her new lyrics (Capitol Records held the copyright of the Kyu Sakamoto original). After the album's uptempo advance single "Rescue Me" fell short of the R&B chart Top Ten and failed to cross over to the Billboard Hot 100, Johnson urged for "Sukiyaki" to be the next single only for Capitol to issue another uptempo track: "I'm Talkin' 'Bout You", which would stall at number 64 on the R&B chart. Capitol did finally afford single release to "Sukiyaki" in January 1981, the track being both serviced to radio and shipped to retail the first week of the year and being re-serviced to radio two weeks later in a promotional package that included a folding fan: in February 1981 – as "Sukiyaki" moved up the R&B chart Top 40 and began charting on the Bubbling Under Hot 100 – Capitol reinforced the single's radio profile by sending out 6,000 custom-cut fan-shaped promo copies of "Sukiyaki" to pop- and R&B-oriented radio stations. The "Sukiyaki" single was packaged in a picture sleeve showing Johnson and her A Taste of Honey partner, Hazel Payne, wearing kimono, and the duo were similarly dressed in their television performances to promote the single. These performances featured a traditional Japanese fan dance by Johnson, while Payne (who was not featured on the recording of "Sukiyaki") played (or in mimed performances appeared to play) June Kuramoto's koto part. A number-one hit on both the R&B and A/C chart, "Sukiyaki" crossed over to number three on the Billboard Hot 100 peaking at that position on June 13, 1981.

=== Charts ===
Weekly charts

Chart (1981)	Peak position
Australia (Kent Music Report)	24
Canada Top Singles (RPM)	4
Canada Adult Contemporary (RPM)	1
New Zealand (RIANZ)	3
US Adult Contemporary (Billboard)	1
US Billboard Hot 100	3
US Hot R&B/Hip-Hop Songs (Billboard)	1
US Cash Box Top 100	4

Year-end charts

Chart (1981)	Rank
Canada	46
New Zealand	31
US Billboard Hot 100	22
US Cash Box Top 100	43

== 4 P.M. version ==
"Sukiyaki"

Single by 4 P.M.

from the album Now's the Time
- Released: 6 September 1994
- Length: 2:42
- Label: Next Plateau; London
- Songwriters: Hachidai Nakamura; Rokusuke Ei; Janice Marie Johnson (English lyrics – uncredited)
- Producers: Mauro P. DeSantis; Jerry Melillo

4 P.M. singles chronology
"Sukiyaki" (1994)	"Lay Down Your Love" (1995)

American R&B group 4 P.M. released a version of "Sukiyaki" in 1994 as their debut single. This version reached number eight on the US Billboard Hot 100. The group remade the song—utilizing the English-language lyrics of the A Taste of Honey version—at the suggestion of Next Plateau Records president Eddie O'Loughlin. The 4 P.M. version was also a top-10 hit in Australia, New Zealand, and Canada, where it topped The Record's sales chart.

=== Charts ===
Weekly charts

Chart (1994–1995)	Peak position
Australia (ARIA)	3
Canada Retail Singles (The Record)	1
Canada Top Singles (RPM)	7
Canada Adult Contemporary (RPM)	1
New Zealand (Recorded Music NZ)	5
US Billboard Hot 100	8
US Adult Contemporary (Billboard)	17
US Hot R&B Singles (Billboard)	75
US Top 40/Mainstream (Billboard)	5
US Top 40/Rhythm-Crossover (Billboard)	16
US Cash Box Top 100	8

Year-end charts

Chart (1995)	Position
Australia (ARIA)	21
Canada Top Singles (RPM)	55
Canada Adult Contemporary (RPM)	40
New Zealand (Recorded Music NZ)	43
US Billboard Hot 100	48
US Top 40/Mainstream (Billboard)	24
US Cash Box Top 100	40

Decade-end charts

Chart (1990–1999)	Position
Canada (Nielsen SoundScan)	24

=== Certifications ===
Region	Certification	Certified units/sales
Australia (ARIA)	Platinum	70,000^{^}
United States (RIAA)	Gold	500,000^{^}
^{^} Shipments figures based on certification alone.

=== Release history ===
Region	Date	Format(s)	Label(s)	Ref.
United States	6 September 1994	—N/a	Next Plateau; London	
Japan	10 December 1994	Mini-CD	Next Plateau; London	
Australia	20 February 1995	CD; cassette	London; Polydor	

== G. H. Hat versions ==
"Sukiyaki"

Single by G. H. Hat

from the album Sukiyaki Versions
- Released: 13 April 2018
- Recorded: 2018
- Length: 4:18
- Label: Viscount Music
- Songwriters: Hachidai Nakamura; Rokusuke Ei; Janice Marie Johnson (English lyrics)

Audio sample
- "Sukiyaki feat. Eriko Tamura": file; help

G. H. Hat released 4 original versions of Sukiyaki and 8 remixed versions of these original tracks in April and July 2018, including remixes by Ralphi Rosario and Dinaire+Bissen. All versions are in the Dance Genre and charted on Billboard's Dance Club Songs Top 50 for 10 weeks with a peak position of number 19. The April versions featured US Singer Alina Renae and used the English Language lyrics written by Janice Marie Johnson. The July versions featured Japanese Super Star Eriko Tamura and used the original Japanese lyrics.

=== Charts ===
Chart (2018)	Peak position
US Billboard Dance Club Songs Top 50	19

== Other versions ==
In 1963, the British record label Pye Records released an instrumental cover version of the song by Kenny Ball and his Jazzmen. They were concerned that English-speaking audiences might find the original title too difficult to remember/pronounce, so they gave it the new title of "Sukiyaki". This title was retained when Capitol Records in the United States, and His Master's Voice in the UK, released Kyu Sakamoto's original version a few months later.

American singer Selena covered the song for her 1989 self-titled album which received some airplay at the time of its release. The song was later released as a single in the United States and Japan & was included in several of Selena's greatest hits packages before and after her death.

Electronic artist Soichi Terada sampled the 4 P.M. cover of the song for the track "Sukiyaki Dohyo Chanko" on his 1996 album Sumo Jungle Grandeur.

Many other artists have recorded cover versions of the song, while others have written and/or performed songs based on the melody.

== See also ==
- 1961 in Japanese music
