= Another Taste =

Studio album by A Taste of Honey
- Released: 1979
- Studio: Golden Sounds Studio, Hollywood, California; Sound Factory, Hollywood, California
- Genre: R&B
- Length: 46:42
- Label: Capitol
- Producer: Larry Mizell; Fonce Mizell; A Taste of Honey

A Taste of Honey chronology
A Taste of Honey (1978)	Another Taste (1979)	Twice as Sweet (1980)

Another Taste is the second studio album by R&B band A Taste of Honey, released in 1979 on Capitol Records. The album peaked at No. 26 on the US Billboard Top R&B Albums chart.

== Singles ==
"Do It Good" peaked at No. 13 on the Billboard Hot R&B Singles chart.

== Critical reception ==
Professional ratings
Review scores
Source	Rating
AllMusic	4/5 stars

Alex Henderson of AllMusic favourably noted "Inevitably, many groups will suffer from the dreaded sophomore curse — they'll impress you with a promising debut album, only to disappoint you with an inferior second album. But Taste of Honey didn't let its audience down on its generally impressive sophomore effort, Another Taste...to their credit, Janice Marie Johnson and Hazel Payne don't try to turn any of the dance numbers into a remake of "Boogie Oogie Oogie"; in fact, they deserve high marks for making this album as unpredictable as it is."

== Track listing ==
No.	Title	Length
1.	"Do It Good"	5:32
2.	"The Rainbow's End"	3:47
3.	"Dance"	4:10
4.	"I Love You"	5:11
5.	"Race"	4:59
6.	"Let's Begin"	3:51
7.	"Take the Boogae or Leave It"	4:42
8.	"Your Love"	5:20
