= One Taste of Honey =

Studio album by Janice-Marie Johnson
- Released: 1984
- Recorded: 1983–1984
- Genre: Soul; disco
- Length: 38:09
- Label: Capitol Records
- Producer: Mike Piccirillo; Gary Goetzman

One Taste of Honey is the debut solo album by Janice-Marie Johnson of the American rhythm and blues group A Taste of Honey. It was produced by Mike Piccirillo and Gary Goetzman for Goetzman/Piccirillo Productions in association with Janice–Marie Enterprises Inc. and included the minor R&B hit Love Me Tonight. The album was recorded following the departure of Hazel Payne from A Taste of Honey in 1983 and after the commercial disappointment of their 1982 album, Ladies of the Eighties.

The album was recorded and released due to contractual obligations made with Capitol Records. One Taste of Honey was released in the summer of 1984, but was a huge commercial disappointment. Jim Mazza, president of Capitol Records at the time, was very supportive of the album, although he was removed by the time the album was released. As a result, there were problems between Johnson and Capitol Records, including promotion and the lead single choice. Two singles were released, "Love Me Tonight" and "She's So Popular". "Love Me Tonight" reached #67 on the then-called Hot Black Singles chart in the United States, while "She's So Popular" was released internationally in an extended version and failed to chart.

After the failure of the album, Capitol Records released the 1984 compilation, Golden Honey, to complete Johnson's contract with the record company. The compilation featured an unreleased song from the One Taste of Honey sessions, "I Want To Be Your Girl", which was also produced by Piccirillo & Goetzman, as well as a new extended remix of "Boogie Oogie Oogie" and six of A Taste of Honey's hits. Following this release, Johnson and the A Taste of Honey act were dropped from Capitol Records and deficits were directed at her, forcing Johnson to file for bankruptcy.

One Taste of Honey was released on LP and cassette, but has yet to be reissued on CD.

== Track listing ==
One Taste of Honey track listing
No.	Title	Writer(s)	Length
1.	"Who's It Gonna Be"	Gary Goetzman; Mike Piccirillo	4:14
2.	"Baby Sister"	Goetzman; Piccirillo	3:50
3.	"Last Chance Romeo"	Goetzman; Janice–Marie Johnson; Piccirillo	3:18
4.	"Beverly Hills"	Goetzman; Johnson; Piccirillo	3:47
5.	"She's So Popular"	Frank Musker; Trevor Lawrence	4:27
6.	"Back with My Boogie"	Frank "Rusty" Hamilton; Johnson	4:08
7.	"Love Me Tonight"	Johnson; Lawrence	4:08
8.	"Givin' It Up"	Goetzman; Johnson; Piccirillo	4:06
9.	"Catch 22"	Goetzman; Johnson; Piccirillo	3:16
10.	"I'll Be There"	Berry Gordy; Bob West; Hal Davis; Willie Hutch	3:51

== Personnel ==
Musicians

- Paul Jackson Jr. – guitar
- Abe Laboriel – bass
- Bill Cuomo, Ron Jeffrey, Steve Rucker – keyboards
- John Robinson – drums
- Darryl Jackson – percussion
- Joel Peskin – saxophone, electronic woodwind

Technical personnel

- Gary Goetzman, Mike Piccirillo – producer
- Janice–Marie Johnson – lead vocals, associate producer
- Mark Wolfson – engineer
- Don Grierson, Varnell Johnson – executive producer
- Wally Traugott – mastering
- Roy Kohara – art direction
- O'Brien – design
- Phil Fewsmith – photography
