= Get Down Tonight: The Disco Explosion =

- Directed by: T.J. Lubinsky
- Produced by: T.J. Lubinsky; Jerry Blavat; Henry J. DeLuca; Bruce Morrow
- Release date: 2004

Get Down Tonight: The Disco Explosion is a 2004 musical documentary special which aired on PBS.

The special featured Deney Terrio, KC & The Sunshine Band, Karen Lynn Gorney, Yvonne Elliman, The Hues Corporation, Peaches & Herb, A Taste of Honey, Rob Parissi of Wild Cherry, Leo Sayer, Irene Cara, Frankie Valli, Martha Wash, Barry Williams, Norma Jean Wright and Felton Pilate. It was directed by T.J. Lubinsky, and produced by Jerry Blavat, Henry J. DeLuca, Cousin Brucie Morrow and Lubinsky. One of the associate producers was Marty Angelo.

A three disc box set of the soundtrack was released shortly after the programme aired. In an AllMusic review by Andy Kellman it was rated 3.5 out of 5 stars.
