= Ladies of the Eighties =

Studio album by A Taste of Honey
- Released: 1982
- Genre: R&B
- Length: 36:00
- Label: Capitol
- Producer: Al McKay; Ronald LaPread; A Taste of Honey

A Taste of Honey chronology
Twice as Sweet (1980)	Ladies of the Eighties (1982)

Professional ratings
Review scores
Source	Rating
AllMusic	2/5 stars

Ladies of the Eighties is the fourth and final studio album by R&B band A Taste of Honey, released in 1982 on Capitol Records. The album peaked at No. 14 on the Billboard Top R&B Albums chart.

== Singles ==
A cover of Smokey Robinson and The Miracles' "I'll Try Something New" peaked at No. 41 on the Billboard Hot 100. It reached No. 9 on the Billboard Hot R&B Singles chart and No. 29 on the Billboard Adult Contemporary chart.

== Track listing ==
No.	Title	Writer(s)	Length
1.	"Sayonara"	Al McKay, David Paul Bryant, Tony Haynes	4:06
2.	"We've Got The Groove"	Al McKay, Janice Marie Johnson	5:42
3.	"I'll Try Something New"	William Robinson	4:11
4.	"We've Got The Groove (Reprise)"	Al McKay, Janice Marie Johnson	0:21
5.	"Lies"	Hazel Payne	4:12
6.	"Diamond Real"	Al McKay, David Paul Bryant, Janice Marie Johnson	4:22
7.	"Never Go Wrong"	Al McKay, David Paul Bryant, Janice Marie Johnson	4:10
8.	"We've Got The Groove (Reprise)"	Al McKay, Janice Marie Johnson	0:21
9.	"Midnight Snack"	Larry King, Ronald LaPread, Taliaferro Harris	4:05
10.	"Leavin' Tomorrow"	Wayne Tweed	4:37

== Credits ==
- Janice Marie Johnson – bass, vocals
- Lina Lee – guitar, vocals
- Al McKay: Producer (tracks 1 to 8)
- David Paul Bryant: Assistant producer (tracks 1 to 8)
- F. Byron Clark: Mixing
- John Golden: Mastering
- Bobby Holland: Photography
- Roy Kohara: Art direction
- Varnell Johnson: Executive producer
