= Max Cantor =

American actor and journalist

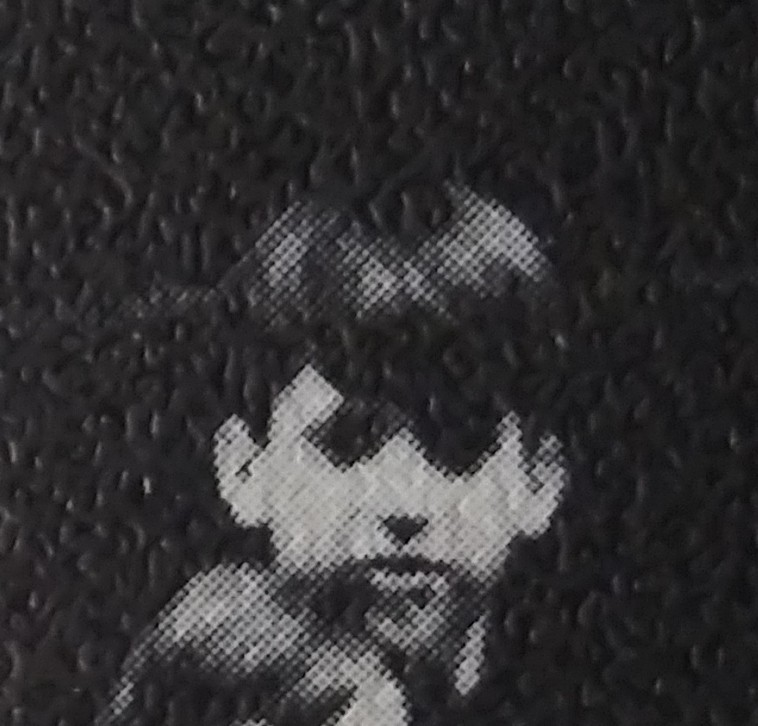
- Cantor in 4th grade, 1969
- Born: Michael Cantor; May 15, 1959; New York City, U.S.
- Died: October 3, 1991 (aged 32); New York City, U.S.
- Education: Harvard University (BA)
- Occupations: journalist and actor
- Years active: 1983–1989
- Father: Arthur Cantor

Michael "Max" Cantor (May 15, 1959 – October 3, 1991) was an American journalist and actor in films such as Dirty Dancing (1987) and Fear, Anxiety & Depression (1989).

== Biography ==
Cantor's father was the theatrical producer Arthur Cantor. He grew up in the Dakota Apartments on West 72nd Street in Manhattan, New York City. Cantor attended Collegiate School but graduated from Buxton School in Williamstown, Massachusetts. He spent his summers until age 14 at Camp Hillcroft in Billings, New York, alongside fellow campers such as the children of American Federation of Teachers president Albert Shanker and actor Burt Lancaster. At camp, he won top roles in Winnie the Pooh and The Velveteen Rabbit. Cantor was a 1982 graduate of Harvard University, where he lived in Adams House and starred in several productions by student director Peter Sellars.

== Career ==
Cantor wrote for The Village Voice about ibogaine as a cure for heroin addiction, and had taken an interest in the East Village cannibal Daniel Rakowitz. He was also interested in and was writing a story about the Temple of the True Inner Light, a psychedelic church in the area.

== Death ==
He died from a heroin overdose at the age of 32. At the time he died, he was conducting research and writing a book about Daniel Rakowitz and the murder of dancer Monika Beerle.

== Filmography ==
Year	Title	Role	Notes
1983	Diner	Shrevie	TV Short
1987	Dirty Dancing	Robbie Gould	
1989	Fear, Anxiety & Depression	Jack	(final film role)
