= Twice as Sweet =

Studio album by A Taste of Honey
- Released: August 1980
- Genre: Soul; disco; post-disco
- Label: Capitol
- Producer: George Duke

A Taste of Honey chronology
| Another Taste (1979) | Twice as Sweet (1980) | Ladies of the Eighties (1982) |

Professional ratings
Review scores
| Source | Rating |
|---|---|
| Allmusic | 3/5 stars |

Twice as Sweet is the third album by American dance/R&B band A Taste of Honey. The album was produced by George Duke and released in August 1980. It includes the heavily sampled "Rescue Me" as well as the band's cover of "Sukiyaki".

== Track listing ==
Twice as Sweet track listing
| No. | Title | Writer(s) | Length |
|---|---|---|---|
| 1. | "Ain't Nothin' But a Party" | George Duke; Janice-Marie Johnson | 4:54 |
| 2. | "Rescue Me" | Byron Miller; Roland Bautista; Johnson | 3:50 |
| 3. | "Superstar Superman" | Hazel Payne | 3:03 |
| 4. | "I'm Talkin' 'Bout You" | Duke; Johnson | 5:15 |
| 5. | "She's a Dancer" | Toshiyuki Kimori; Casey Rankin; Payne; Johnson | 3:07 |
| 6. | "Don't You Lead Me On" | Duke; Johnson | 3:19 |
| 7. | "Goodbye Baby" | Duke; Johnson | 4:01 |
| 8. | "Say That You'll Stay" | Duke; Payne; Johnson | 4:25 |
| 9. | "Sukiyaki" | Hachidai Nakamura; Rokusuke Ei; Johnson (English lyrics – uncredited) | 3:44 |

== Personnel ==
A Taste of Honey

- Janice-Marie Johnson – lead vocals, bass
- Hazel P. Payne – lead vocals, guitars
- George Duke – keyboards, production
- Donald Ray Johnson – drums, backing vocals

Additional personnel

- June Kuramoto – koto on "Sukiyaki"
- Cecil Hale – executive producer
