= Fear, Anxiety & Depression =

Fear, Anxiety and Depression
- Directed by: Todd Solondz
- Written by: Todd Solondz
- Produced by: Steve Golin; Sigurjorn Sighvatsson; Nigel Sinclair; Stanley J. Wlodkowski
- Starring: Max Cantor; Alexandra Gersten; Jane Hamper; Todd Solondz; Stanley Tucci; Jill Wisoff; J. J. Barry; Helen Hanft; Anne De Salvo
- Cinematography: Stefan Czapsky
- Edited by: Peter Austin; Emily Paine; Barry Rubinow
- Music by: Joe Romano
- Distributed by: The Samuel Goldwyn Company
- Release date: December 8, 1989
- Running time: 85 minutes

Fear, Anxiety and Depression is a 1989 American comedy film written and directed by Todd Solondz and starring Solondz, Stanley Tucci and Jill Wisoff.

== Plot ==
Solondz plays Ira Ellis, a neurotic aspiring playwright in the East Village of Manhattan, whose latest work is titled Despair. The film consists of vignettes featuring equally pretentious and as yet unsuccessful members of the arts scene including Ira's friend, Jack, a painter; his chubby girlfriend Sharon, a mime; his subsequent girlfriend, a performance artist; and Jack's cast-off girlfriend with whom he has a fling, an actress. Meanwhile, an old classmate of Ira's, Donny (played by Stanley Tucci in one of his first roles), has achieved success without apparent effort and takes up with Sharon.

== Cast ==
- Todd Solondz as Ira Ellis
- Stanley Tucci as Donny
- Anne De Salvo as Sylvia
- Jill Wisoff as Sharon
- Helen Hanft as Roz
- Alexandra Gerston as Janice
- Max Cantor as Jack
- Jane Hamper as "Junk"
- J.J. Barry as Sam

== Production ==
The film was Solondz's first for a major studio, after his work in film school had attracted interest and he had been offered a three-picture contract. He had wanted to title it The Young and the Hopeless and was deeply unhappy with the lack of creative control; he has called it "a painful demoralizing experience", and did not make another film for several years.

== Critical reception ==
A reviewer for The New York Times called Fear, Anxiety and Depression "an amiable, uninspired spoof of the notion that agony and art go together" that acknowledges its debts to other film makers (such as Woody Allen in Ira's character and mannerisms) but lacking a "distinctive voice or vision". A retrospective review for IFC called it "wan and obvious" satire.
