= Ripe (1996 film) =

- Movie poster
- Directed by: Mo Ogrodnik
- Starring: Monica Keena; Daisy Eagan
- Cinematography: Wolfgang Held
- Edited by: Sarah Durham
- Distributed by: C&P Productions
- Release date: September 10, 1996 (TIFF)
- Running time: 92 minutes
- Country: United States
- Language: English
- Box office: $79,727

Ripe is a 1996 American independent drama film. It was the first film written and directed by Mo Ogrodnik and starred Monica Keena and Daisy Eagan.

== Plot ==
Fraternal twin sisters Rosie (Daisy Eagan) and Violet (Monica Keena) lead a life of hard knocks with very poor, abusive parents. Glad to be rid of their parents who have been killed in a car crash, the twins vow to run away to Kentucky in search of a better life. While on the road, the girls sneak onto a military base seeking food and shelter and meet up with Pete, a drifter working as a grounds keeper, who takes them in.

Throughout the movie there are overtones of Rosie's jealousy over the attention the pretty Violet receives from men. For example, when Violet and Pete start a relationship, Rosie becomes increasingly jealous before eventually coming to realize that the sisters' childhood bond has been destroyed forever. Her attitude leads to actions with tragic consequences.

In the movie’s final scene, Violet is seen flying away on a plane after leaving Rosie. Rosie holds the gun in her mouth, firing with every chamber. However, Violet holds the bullets in her hand, revealing she took them out prior to her departure.

== Cast ==
- Monica Keena as Violet
- Daisy Eagan as Rosie
- Gordon Currie as Pete
- Karen Lynn Gorney as Janet Wyman

== Trivia ==
- Aerial coordination for the movie was done by South Carolina skydiver and pilot Robert "Bobby" Frierson. Local Barnwell, South Carolina, skydivers John Adair, Mike Holbert, and Terry Curtis were cast as paratroopers in the film. Nine years after Ripe was filmed, Frierson died in a skydiving accident on September 11, 2005. He'd had a stroke on January 30, 2000.
