= G. H. Hat =

American multi-genre producer, remixer, composer and performer

G.H. Hat
- Origin: Los Angeles, California, United States
- Genres: Pop, dance, classical, edm
- Years active: 2016–present
- Label: Viscount Music
- Website: http://ghhat.com/

G.H. Hat is an American multi-genre producer, remixer, composer and performer. G.H. Hat has released songs in the classical, EDM, pop, and dance genres. Two of his EDM/Pop releases have charted on Billboard magazine's Dance Club Songs: "I Got a Problem (I Wonder...) feat. Mickey Shiloh" and “Sukiyaki (feat. Alina Renae)". And his classical crossover release, "Piano Jams 2", Charted on Billboard magazine's Classical Crossover Albums chart.

== Career ==
With his first vocal pop/dance release, “I Got a Problem (I Wonder...) [feat. Mickey Shiloh], G.H. Hat also collaborated with and released remixes by two Grammy nominated DJ/remixers, Ralphi Rosario and Mr. Mig as well as remixes by other DJ/Remixers such as Dinaire+Bissen, DJ cMellow, and Stan Medley. With his second vocal pop/dance release, G.H. Hat released a pop/dance cover of the 1963 #1 Billboard hit “Sukiyaki”. With "Sukiyaki (feat. Alina Renae)", G.H. Hat again collaborated with and released remixes by Ralphi Rosario, Dinaire+Bissen and DJ cMellow, as well as a Japanese remix of his own English version featuring Japanese Superstar Eriko Tamura.

“I Got a Problem (I Wonder...) [feat. Mickey Shiloh]" released as a 12 track "single" album) debuted at # 43 on Billboard magazine's Dance Club Songs chart, remained on the chart for 10 weeks peaking at #16 in its sixth week on the chart and also charting on Billboard’s HOT SINGLES SONG SALES chart for 7 weeks peaking at #5.“Sukiyaki (feat. Alina Renae)” also debuted on Billboard’s Dance Club Songs chart at #43, remained on the chart for 10 weeks peaking at #19 in its fifth week on the chart. Originally released as a 10 track "one song" album, in its 8th week on the Dance Club Songs Chart G.H. Hat released two additional Japanese vocal remixes featuring Japanese superstar, Eriko Tamura.

On the classical side, "Piano Jams 2" a release of G.H. Hat's 5 previous piano compositions, debuted on Billboard magazine's Classical Crossover Albums chart at #6 for the week of October 15, 2022. Peaked at #4 in its third week on the chart, and remained on the chart for 12 weeks.

G.H. Hat started his career in the classical genre, releasing 290 tracks prior to entering the EDM genre in mid 2016 with two instrumental releases, Primal and Joyogistic. Adding several more EDM instrumental releases, before moving onto the POP/ DANCE genres in late 2017 with his first vocal release.

G.H. Hat has garnered much attention from reviewers because of his unusual out-of-the-box success. "A dance club newcomer, he glided onto the dance club charts outperforming and charting higher than songs by such icons as Justin Bieber, Drake, David Guetta and Cardi B.” "G.H. Hat is a marvel in that he transitions from classical to EDM, to pop music with seemingly no effort." and "G.H. Hat… is on his way to becoming one of the most anticipatory acts in the EDM arena".

G.H. Hat has currently been extending his "Piano Jam" releases which now number five, while dance clubbers and dance club musicians await the reopening of the Billboard magazine Dance Club Songs Charts which have been down since March 28, 2020 due to the pandemic.
