= Disco Step-by-Step =

Local television program in Buffalo, New York

Disco Step-by-Step is a local television show in Buffalo, New York which featured disco music, dance instruction, and hustle dancing. The show was created, written, produced and first hosted by Marty Angelo. The show aired in New York's western region, the eastern part of Pennsylvania, and southern Canada. Broadcast between January 1, 1977, and January 15, 1980, it had 73 episodes and was watched by more than 400,000 people every week.

Taped between the end of 1975 and 1976, the show was seen on local Public-access television cable TV channels in Buffalo and western New York State from January 1, 1977 to June 30, 1977; the program was shot in black and white.

On September 23, 1977, the show moved to WBEN-TV (channel 4, now WIVB), where the show saw various technical improvements, including color. The show's host changed with the move, with the duties now passed to Kevin O'Connell, who at the time was also WBEN-TV's weatherman. The program ran in the form of first-run and repeat telecasts on WBEN-TV until January 15, 1980.

Various video clips of the show were featured in 2005 in the Experience Music Project's travelling , a VH1 television disco special, and a DVD disco documentary.

== Bibliography ==
- Ortiz, Lori (2011). Disco Dance. Westport, Connecticut: Greenwood Publishing Group. pp. 42, 54, 154–155. ISBN 978-0-313-37746-4 – via Google Books.
