= 4 P.M. (group) =

American male R&B group

4 P.M. (For Positive Music) a.k.a. The Official 4PM
- Origin: Baltimore, Maryland, U.S.
- Genre: R&B
- Years active: 1991–present
- Labels: Next Plateau, 4PM, Pony Canyon, The Official 4PM Records
- Members: Roberto Pena, Jr. Reney "Ray" Pena; Larry McFarland
- Past members: Martiz Ware

4 P.M. (For Positive Music) is an American male R&B group best known for their cover version of "Sukiyaki", which peaked at number 8 on the US Billboard Hot 100 in February 1995.

4 P.M. was started in 1991 in the suburbs of Baltimore, Maryland by brothers Roberto Pena, Jr. and Reney (Ray) Pena with Larry McFarland and Martiz Ware. They were originally known as IV Real, and played local talent shows.

After a 1994 performance at a record release party, they were signed by Next Plateau Records and moved to New York City. Their debut album, Now's the Time, which peaked at No. 96 on the Billboard Top R&B/Hip-Hop Albums chart, included a cover version of Kyu Sakamoto's 1960s hit "Sukiyaki". The group's version of "Sukiyaki" peaked at No. 8 on the Billboard Hot 100 singles chart and was certified gold in 1995. It also reached the top 5 in Australia and New Zealand.

Their second album, 1997's A Light in the Dark, did not fare as well, but did include the minor hit "I Gave You Everything", which peaked at No. 67 on Billboard's Hot R&B/Hip-Hop Singles & Tracks chart.

After a brief hiatus, the group—minus Martiz Ware—regrouped and started Pena Brothers Productions. In 2000, they released a third album, For Positive Music—a mix of pop, R&B, hip hop, and Latin music—on their own 4PM label.

In 2001, they released a fourth album, Sweet Soul on the Japanese Pony Canyon label.

In 2022, they released the single "Some of the Time" on their independent label The Official 4PM Records. They also released an EP, Some of the Time ReMix'd which includes remixes by DJ Soulchild, Mr. Mig, and Stereosoulz.

== Discography ==
=== Albums ===
- Now's the Time (1994, Next Plateau/PolyGram) US #126, US R&B #96
- Light in the Dark (1997, Next Plateau)
- For Positive Music (2000, 4PM)
- Sweet Soul (2001, Pony Canyon International)

=== Singles ===
- "Sukiyaki" (CD & cassette single, 1994), London - #8 US, #3 AUS, #5 NZ
- "Lay Down Your Love" (CD & cassette single, 1995), London - #31 AUS, #107 US
- "Years from Here" (CD & cassette single, 15 August 1995), London
- "I Gave You Everything" (CD single, 25 March 1997), Next Plateau - #124 US, #67 US R&B
