= Buxton School (Massachusetts) =

School in Williamstown, Massachusetts, United States

Location
- 291 South St; Williamstown, Berkshire County, Massachusetts 01267-2878; United States

Information
- School type: Private, college-preparatory school
- Established: 1928; 98 years ago
- Founder: Ellen Geer Sangster
- Director: John Kalapos
- Teaching staff: 20.4 (FTE) (2025-26)
- Grades: 9-12
- Gender: Coeducational
- Enrollment: 48 (2025-26)
- Student to teacher ratio: 2.4∶1 (2025-26)
- Campus size: 150 acres (0.61 km^{2})
- Campus type: Rural
- Colors: Green; White
- Athletics: basketball • skiing • snowboarding • cross-country skiing • ice-skating • ultimate Frisbee • mountain biking • yoga • hiking • tennis • softball • soccer • volleyball • running
- Mascot: Lion
- Tuition: 2026-2027 * $43,000 (day students) * $71,500 (boarding students)
- Website: www.buxtonschool.org
- Last updated: November 4, 2025; 11 months ago

Buxton School is a private, coeducational, college preparatory, and boarding and day school for grades 9–12 located in Williamstown, Massachusetts, US. As of 2023, the school had a student body of 68 students.

The Main House at Buxton.

Students at Buxton participating in work program.

== History ==
The school was founded by Ellen Geer Sangster in 1928 as a coeducational country day school in Short Hills, New Jersey. In 1947, the high school was moved to Sangster's family estate in Williamstown and formed anew as a boarding school. Nineteen students and many faculty members followed Sangster from New Jersey to Williamstown's nascent boarding school. The primary and middle schools stayed in Short Hills as the newly formed Far Brook School.

=== 2022 Campuswide Smartphone Ban ===
In 2022, Buxton School announced a ban on smartphones in which students and faculty were prohibited from bringing a smartphone to campus. Students and faculty were instead given "light phones" which have limited capabilities and no internet access. There were various reasons for the ban, but the most notable reason was the constant temptation to check social media. Despite smartphones being banned, computers and other non-pocket internet devices were still allowed on campus. This smartphone ban resulted in the school being widely recognized on various news networks, including CNN.

== Academics ==
Available classes include: English, Spanish, American History, Ancient Greece and Rome, Sociology, World Religions, Algebra, Geometry, Pre-Calculus, Calculus, Multivariable calculus, Astronomy, Biology, Chemistry, Health, Marine Biology, Physics, The Practice of Poetry, Writing: Daily Themes, Drama, Music, Ceramics, Photography, Printmaking, Studio Art, Video Production, and more.

If students are interested in a subject that is not offered as a class, they can initiate an independent study with a faculty member relevant to their subject, or a teacher from outside. Private music lessons are offered. More advanced students can take more advanced science and math courses at Williams College, which is a mile away.

Graduates' requirements are based on a credit system:

Sixteen credits are required for graduation, which includes four years of English and a year of American history. Students are also counseled to complete a minimum of 3 years of mathematics, two years of social science, two years of laboratory science, and three years of a foreign language. In addition, students are strongly encouraged to pursue courses in the arts.

— Buxton School Website: Academics Overview

The grading system is based on report conferences. Students are given grades for the purposes of college, but they are not allowed to see them until they are relevant to the student's college application process. Feedback from teachers is in the form of report letters and report conferences. Conversations and written assessments give the teacher and student a full understating of the student's performance in the class.

== Campus ==
Buxton occupies 114 acres (0.46 km^{2}) of New England meadow and forest in the Berkshires of Western Massachusetts. Buildings on campus include the Main House, a girls' dorm, and where meals are served; The Boys' Dorm, affectionately called "The Barn" due to its history as a barn; The Classroom Building, which houses most of the classrooms on campus; the Arts complex which includes buildings for Photography, Studio Art, Music, and Ceramics; The Theater; The Library; and faculty houses.

== Tuition ==
Tuition for the 2026-2027 academic year is $71,500 for boarding students, and $43,000 for day students.

== Notable alumni ==
- Shari Belafonte, actress, model, and singer
- Max Cantor, actor and journalist
- John Cazale, actor known for The Godfather
- Charles Harrington Elster, author and radio commentator
- Barbara Bel Geddes, Golden Globe and Emmy award-winning actress and children's author
- Yasmin Aga Khan, philanthropist
- Christian Parenti, investigative journalist
- Peter Shumlin, 81st Governor of Vermont
- Justin Theroux, actor and screenwriter of films including Iron Man 2 and Zoolander 2
- Duncan Tonatiuh, award-winning children's book author
- Marco Williams, documentary filmmaker
- Frank Wood, Tony award-winning actor
- [Matt Mondanile], musician
