= Joe Grifasi =

American actor

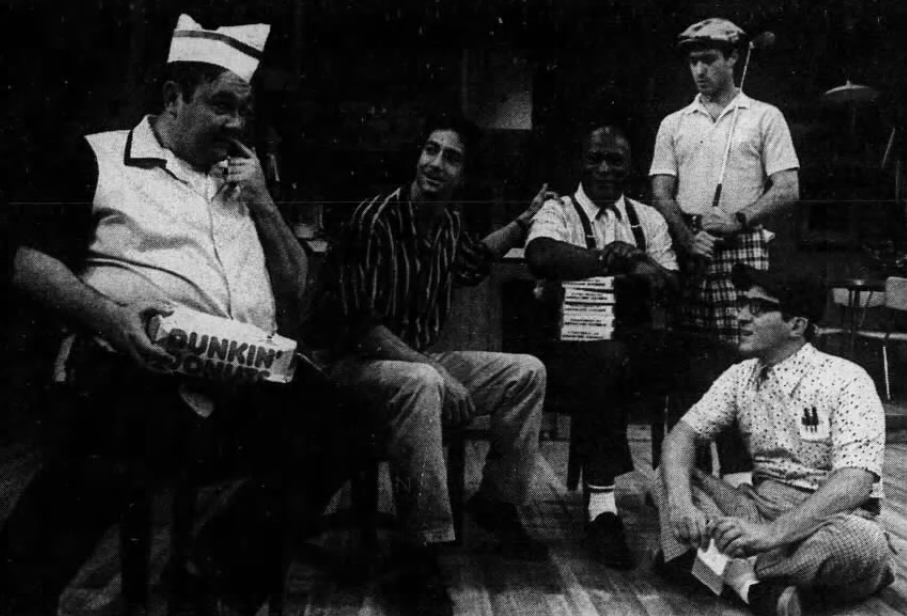
- Grifasi (bottom right) with David Schramm, David Strathairn, John Amos and Joe Urla in The Boys Next Door, 1987
- Born: Joseph G. Grifasi; June 14, 1944 (age 82); Buffalo, New York, U.S.
- Other name: Joseph Grifasi
- Education: Canisius College (BA); Yale University (MFA)
- Occupation: Actor
- Years active: 1974–present
- Spouse: Jane Ira Bloom

Joseph G. Grifasi (born June 14, 1944) is an American character actor of film, stage and television.

== Early life and education ==
Grifasi was born in Buffalo, New York, the son of Patricia (née Gaglione) and Joseph J. Grifasi, a skilled laborer. Grifasi graduated from Bishop Fallon High School, a now-defunct Roman Catholic high school in Buffalo, when he made the decision that he wanted to be, not just any old actor, but a character actor.

== Career ==
Grifasi has more than 130 film and television credits to his name, including two New York Yankees elected to the Baseball Hall of Fame: Phil Rizzuto in 61*, set in 1961; and Yogi Berra in The Bronx Is Burning, set in 1977.

He also played Pier 32 dock foreman in The Naked Gun: From the Files of Police Squad!, having one of the memorable scenes of the film while being questioned by Frank Drebin.

From 2005 and 2021, Grifasi has portrayed Defense Attorney Heshi Horowitz, who goes on to become a Superior Court Judge on Law & Order: Special Victims Unit.

== Filmography ==
=== Film ===
Year	Title	Role	Notes
1978	On the Yard	Morris	
1978	The Deer Hunter	Bandleader	
1979	Something Short of Paradise	Barney Collins	
1980	Hide in Plain Sight	Matty Stanek	
1981	The Gentleman Bandit	Detective Esposito	
1981	Honky Tonk Freeway	Osvaldo	
1982	Fighting Back	Detective	Uncredited
1982	Still of the Night	Joseph Vitucci	
1984	Splash	Manny	
1984	The Pope of Greenwich Village	Jimmy the Cheese Man	
1984	The Flamingo Kid	Mario Minetta	
1985	Brewster's Millions	J.B. Donaldo	
1985	Bad Medicine	Gómez	
1986	F/X	Mickey	
1987	Ironweed	Jack	
1987	Matewan	Fausto	
1987	Moonstruck	Shy Waiter	
1988	The Appointments of Dennis Jennings	Bartender	Short film
1988	Beaches	Otto Titsling	
1988	Big Business	Desk Clerk	
1988	The Naked Gun: From the Files of Police Squad!	Foreman	
1989	Chances Are	Omar	
1989	The Feud	Bud Bullard	
1990	Presumed Innocent	Tommy Molto	
1991	City of Hope	Pauly	
1992	Primary Motive	Paul Melton	
1993	Benny & Joon	Mike	
1993	Household Saints	Frank Manzone	
1994	The Hudsucker Proxy	Lou	
1994	Naked Gun 33 1/3: The Final Insult	Director	
1994	Natural Born Killers	Deputy Sheriff Duncan Homolka	
1995	Batman Forever	Bank Guard	
1995	Heavy	Leo	
1995	Money Train	Riley	
1995	Tall Tale: The Unbelievable Adventure	Man in Top Hat	
1995	Two Bits	Uncle Joe	
1996	One Fine Day	Manny Feldstein	
1997	Sunday	Scottie Elster	
1998	The Naked Man	Koski	
1999	The Out-of-Towners	Arresting Cop	
2000	Looking for an Echo	Vic	
2001	Queenie in Love	Berthold	
2002	Auto Focus	Strip Club M.C.	
2002	Changing Lanes	Judge Cosell	
2003	Bought & Sold	Alphonso 'Chunks' Colon	
2004	13 Going on 30	Mr. Flamhaff	
2005	Slow Burn	Desk Sgt. Drown	
2006	A Crime	BIll	
2006	Creating Karma	Prighorn	
2007	Dark Matter	Professor Colby	
2007	The Last New Yorker	Jerry	
2009	Under New Management	Msgr. Tranni	
2012	Othello	Brabantio	
2014	Julie Taymor's A Midsummer Night's Dream	Peter Quince	
2016	The American Side	The Serb	
2016	Baked in Brooklyn	David's Dad	
2016	No Pay, Nudity	Mr. Davenport	

=== Television ===
Year	Title	Role	Notes
1974–1975	Police Surgeon	Jerry Shields / Sam Sitko	2 episodes
1977	Great Performances	Corporal Matson	Episode: "Secret Service"
1977	Camera Three	Louis: Suicide in B Flat	2 episodes
1982	The Elephant Man	Pinhead Manager	TV film
1983	Will There Really Be a Morning?	Wyler	TV film
1986	The Equalizer	Lt. Vocek	Episode: "The Line"
1986	One Police Plaza	Inspector Nicholas Zambrano	TV film
1987	Hill Street Blues	Ronnie Delacroce	Episode: "Sorry Wrong Number"
1987	The Ellen Burstyn Show	Timothy Winnegrew	Episode: "The Box"
1988	Matlock	Hot Dog Vendor	Episode: "The Ambassador: Part 1"
1989	Men	Lieutenant Chibo	Episode: "The Trouble with Harvey"
1989	Moonlighting	Kapatkin	Episode: "Lunar Eclipse"
1989	Perfect Witness	Breeze	TV film
1989	Kojak: Ariana	Lieutenant Rastelli	TV film
1990	Midnight Caller	Harry Manx	Episode: "Planes"
1990	Roseanne	IRS Office Supervisor	Episode: "April Fool's Day"
1990	Down Home	Dr. Ort	Episode: "Sometimes a Cigar's Just a Cigar or Wade"
1990	Capital News		Episode: "Swanns and Drakes"
1990–1991	WIOU	Tony Pro	Main role, 18 episodes
1991	Law & Order	Ezra Gould	Episode: "Out of Control"
1992	Citizen Cohn	Gerald Walpin	TV film
1992	Sinatra	George Evans	Miniseries, 2 episodes
1993–1994	L.A. Law	Dominic Nuzzi	5 episodes
1993	Taking the Heat	Lou Valentine	TV film
1996, 1998, 2001	Law & Order	Defense Attorney James Linde	3 episodes
1996–1997	Early Edition	Harry Hawks	3 episodes
1996	Chicago Hope	Larry Ruscetti	Episode: "Mummy Dearest"
1997	The Practice	Harry Papp	Episode: "Sex, Lies and Monkeys"
1998	Homicide: Life on the Street	Lt. Walter Neal	Episode: "Closet Cases", uncredited
1999	Switching Goals	Dave	TV film
2000	The Other Me	Conrad	TV film
2001	61*	Phil Rizzuto	TV film
2003	ER	Tom Williams	Episode: "Now What?"
2004	Hope & Faith	Leo	Episode: "The Diner Show"
2005–2013, 2015–2021	Law & Order: Special Victims Unit	Defense Attorney Hashi Horowitz/Judge Hashi Horowitz	14 episodes
2007	The Bronx is Burning	Yogi Berra	Miniseries, 8 episodes
2014	Elementary	Captain Moretti	Episode: "Rip Off"
2016	The Good Wife	Judge John Mata	Episode: "Judged"
2016–2021	Bull	Judge Arlen Rand	7 episodes
2017	The Marvelous Mrs. Maisel	Judge Hackett	Episode: "Because You Left"
2018–2019	Lodge 49	Burt	11 episodes
2020	The Good Fight	Judge John Mata	Episode: "The Gang Deals with Alternate Reality"
2020	I Know This Much Is True	Steve Falice	Episode: "Four", miniseries
2022	Evil	Lombino	3 episodes
2022	New Amsterdam	Lilo Steinhauser	Episode: "Right Place"
