= Now's the Time (4 P.M. album) =

Studio album by 4 P.M.
- Released: March 28, 1995
- Genre: R&B, pop
- Length: 52:09
- Label: Next Plateau
- Producer: Mauro P. DeSantis and Jerry Melillo

4 P.M. chronology
Now's the Time (1995)	Light in the Dark (1997)

Now's the Time is the debut album by 4 P.M., released in 1995. It contains their hit cover version of "Sukiyaki", which reached the top 10 in the U.S., Canada, Australia and New Zealand.

== Track listing ==
1. "Sukiyaki" - 2:42
2. "Lay Down Your Love" - 4:27
3. "Forever in My Heart" - 4:35
4. "Gift of Perfect Love" - 4:02
5. "Yes" - 3:53
6. "In This Life" - 3:06
7. "Naturally" - 5:05
8. "For What More" - 4:12
9. "Father and Child" - 3:59
10. "Time (Clock of the Heart)" - 4:27
11. "Then Came You" - 3:32
12. "So Glad You Said the Words" - 3:55
13. "Years from Here" - 4:19 (bonus track)
14. "Lay Down Your Love" (4 A.M. Lover's Groove) - 4:17 (bonus track)

== Charts ==
Chart (1995)	Peak position
Australian Albums (ARIA Charts)	87
