= Daisy Eagan =

American actress (born 1979)

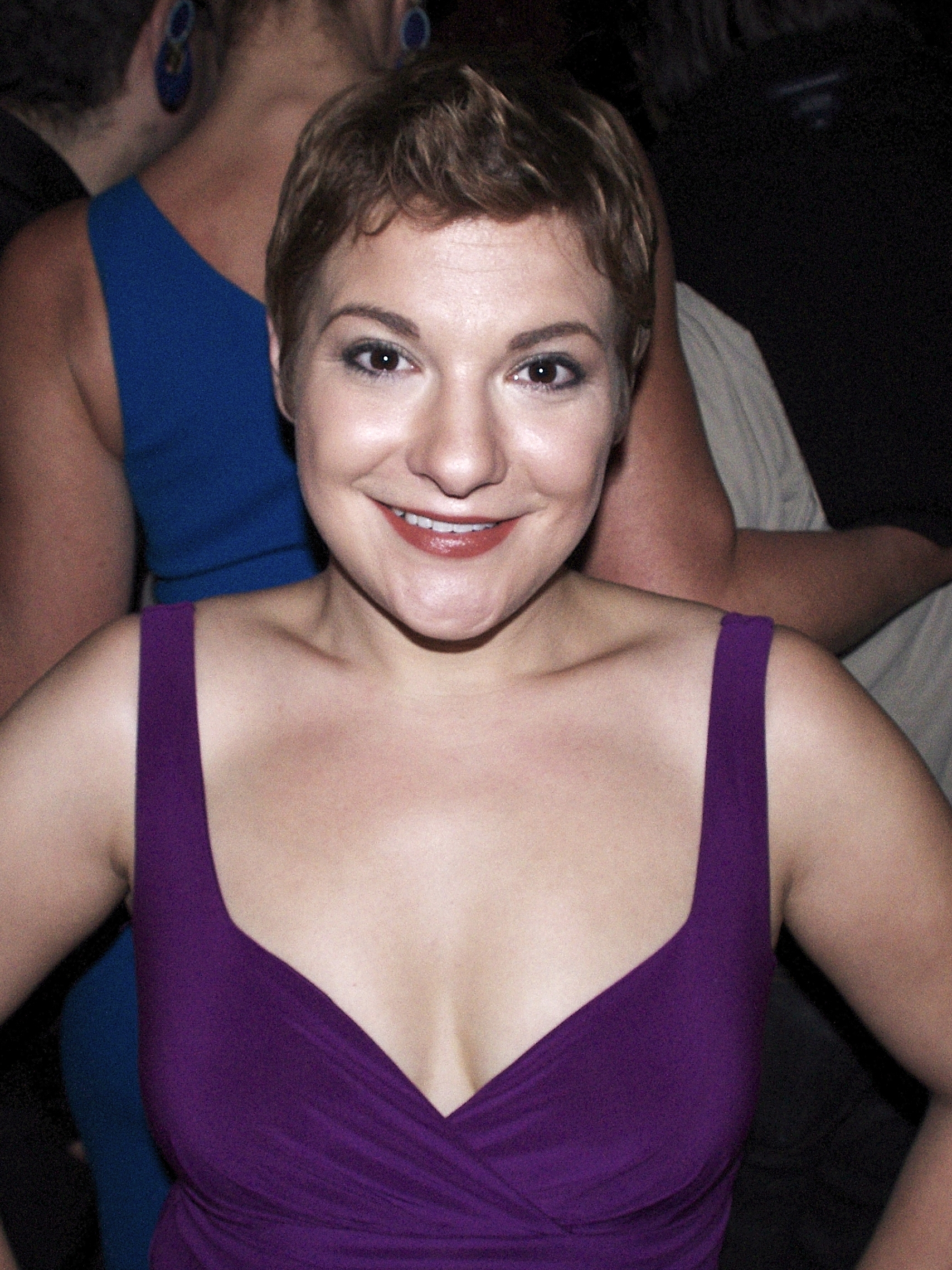
- Eagan at a party in New York, 2011
- Born: November 4, 1979 (age 47); Brooklyn, New York City, U.S.
- Education: Bard College at Simon's Rock; Antioch University
- Occupation: Actress
- Years active: 1988–present
- Spouses: Patrick Comer (m. 2003; div. 2006) Kurt Bloom (m. 2020)
- Children: 1
- Awards: Best Featured Actress in a Musical

Daisy Eagan (born November 4, 1979) is an American actress, known for her roles on Broadway. In 1991, she won the Tony Award for Best Featured Actress in a Musical for her performance as Mary Lennox in The Secret Garden. At 11 years old, she became the youngest female, and the second youngest Tony Award winner in history.

== Early life ==
Eagan was born in Brooklyn to Jewish parents on November 4, 1979. Her mother, Andrea Boroff Eagan, was a medical writer; she died of cancer when her daughter was 13 years old. Eagan's father, Richard Eagan, is a visual and performing artist. Daisy Eagan was inspired to become an actress at age 6 after seeing him perform.

== Career ==
Eagan made her Broadway debut as an alternate for Young Cosette and Young Eponine in the original Broadway production of Les Misérables. In 1991, Eagan was cast as Mary Lennox in the Broadway adaptation of The Secret Garden. At eleven years old, Eagan won the Tony Award for Best Performance by a Featured Actress in a Musical for her performance. She was nominated for a Drama Desk Award for Outstanding Actress in a Musical and an Outer Critics Circle Award for Best Actress in a Musical for the role. At eleven years old, she is the youngest female to win a Tony to date (as of 2024), and is the second youngest person to win a Tony. (Frankie Michaels was one month past his 11th birthday when he won his Tony for Mame.)

In 1992, Eagan sang "Broadway Baby" in the concert Sondheim: A Celebration at Carnegie Hall.

In 1999, Eagan returned to Broadway as Rita and Young Julia Morkan in James Joyce's The Dead when it premiered at Playwrights Horizons. It transferred to Broadway the next year in 2000.

She appeared in the Blank Theatre Company's production of The Wild Party in 2005 in Los Angeles as the street waif, and is the recipient of the 2005 LA Weekly Theater Award for Best Supporting Actress in a Musical.

She appeared in the Manhattan Concert Productions presentation of The Secret Garden at David Geffen Hall in February 2016 as the housemaid Martha. She reprised her role as Martha in 2016 at the Shakespeare Theatre Company in Washington, D.C.; this production then moved in 2017 to the 5th Avenue Theatre in Seattle.

Her film work includes Losing Isaiah (1995), Ripe (1996) and Tony n' Tina's Wedding (2004). She has appeared on television in episodes of Without a Trace (2007), The Unit (2006), Ghost Whisperer (2006), Numb3rs (2006), The Mentalist (2012), and Girls (2017).

In 2018, Eagan played Brigid Blake in the U.S. national tour of The Humans, appearing alongside Richard Thomas in Stephen Karam’s Tony Award–winning 2016 play.

=== Podcast ===
Eagan writes and hosts the podcast Strange and Unexplained, as well as associated live shows.

== Personal life ==
Eagan attended Bard College at Simon's Rock and graduated from Antioch University in Los Angeles with a Bachelor of Arts in psychology and creative writing.

In 2003, she married Patrick Comer, a financial consultant; they divorced in 2006.

Eagan first came out to her parents when she was 12, thinking she was gay before she explored more of her sexuality. She currently identifies as "queer poly", and is in a relationship with Ryan Holsather, who is polyamorous and nonbinary.

Eagan identifies as non-binary and uses she/they pronouns.

== Stage credits ==
Year	Title	Role	Venue	Ref.
1987	Les Misérables	Young Cosette, Young Eponine	Broadway, Broadway Theatre	
1991	The Secret Garden	Mary Lennox	Broadway, St. James Theatre	
1999	James Joyce's The Dead	Rita, Young Julia Morkan	Off-Broadway, Playwrights Horizons	
2000	James Joyce's The Dead	Rita, Young Julia Morkan	Broadway, Belasco Theatre	
2001	Be Aggressive	Hannah	Regional, La Jolla Playhouse	
2005	The Wild Party	Sally	Regional, Blank Theatre Company	
2011	Ghostlight	Molly Cook	Off-Broadway, New York Musical Theatre Festival	
2013	Love, Loss, and What I Wore	Performer	Off-Broadway, Westside Theatre	
2014	Stoneface: The Rise and Fall and Rise of Buster Keaton	Mae Scriven	Regional, Pasadena Playhouse	
2016	Wit	Susie Monahan, R.N., B.S.N.	Regional, North Carolina Theatre	
2017	The Secret Garden	Martha Sowerby	Regional, 5th Avenue Theatre	
2017	The Secret Garden	Martha Sowerby	Regional, Shakespeare Theatre Company	
2018	The Humans	Brigid Blake	U.S. National Tour	

== Awards and nominations ==
Award	Year	Category	Work	Result	Ref.
1991	Tony Awards	Best Featured Actress in a Musical	The Secret Garden	Won	
1991	Drama Desk Awards	Outstanding Featured Actress in a Musical	The Secret Garden	Nominated	
1991	Outer Critics Circle Awards	Outstanding Featured Actress in a Musical	The Secret Garden	Nominated	
