= Freeman King =

American comedian (1943–2002)

- Born: June 1, 1943; Pelahatchie, Mississippi, U.S.
- Died: June 1, 2002 (aged 59); Los Angeles, California, U.S.

Comedy career
- Medium: Stand-up, television, film, writing
- Genres: Observational comedy, satire
- Subjects: American culture, everyday life

Freeman King (June 1, 1943 – June 1, 2002) was an American comedian known for such television shows and films as The Sonny & Cher Comedy Hour, Fletch, Dance Fever, Under The Rainbow, and The Buddy Holly Story.

At the suggestion of Redd Foxx, King teamed with comedian Murray Langston and became regular performers on The Sonny & Cher Comedy Hour.

King died on his 59th birthday in Los Angeles, of a heart attack.
