= Jill Wisoff =

- Jill Wisoff at home in Greenwich Village, 2012

Background information
- Born: April 27, 1956 (age 69); Queens, New York
- Occupations: songwriter; film composer; director; writer; performer

Jill Wisoff is an American filmmaker, performer, actress and film composer best known for original music and songs in Welcome to the Dollhouse, Todd Solondz's critically acclaimed 1996 Sundance Film Festival Grand Jury Prize winner.

== Works ==
Her original musical scores can be heard in such representative work as Second Skin by filmmaker Amy Talkington, a 1999 Sundance Film Festival selection that sold to television worldwide. For producer Alan Sacks, she scored Melissa Gilbert's 1996 directorial debut, Me and My Hormones, an ABC Afterschool Special; in Smart House, a 1999 TV movie for Disney Channel directed by LeVar Burton, she co-wrote the song "The House is Jumpin'" with Barry Goldberg and Joel Diamond, and contributed additional score. Working with filmmaker Adam Goldstein and produced by William Kennedy, she scored Woman Found Dead in Elevator (2000), based on a story by Ruth Tarson with special material provided by Hunter S. Thompson and starring Wit Broadway star Kathleen Chalfant and George Plimpton.

Her debut novel, Shelter Island: A January Hoolihan and Crisscross Adventure, and its sequel, Paris, published by Fantasy Creature Books, are available for purchase spring and summer 2026.

== Biography ==
Born in Queens, New York, she studied composition in the Manhattan School of Music Preparatory Division and at Bennington College under Vivian Fine and Henry Brant. She attended the Neighborhood Playhouse and completed an MFA in Writing, concentration fiction, at the New School. She directed, composed music, performed in stock and off-off Broadway. She was lead guitarist for all-girl reggae band, Steppin' Razor, produced by Chris Spedding, who later produced her band The Con Artists, including some songs heard on the Welcome to the Dollhouse soundtrack. She later toured as bassist for the legendary Johnny Thunders as a member of his last band, The Oddballs. Between tours, she completed reshoots co-starring as Sharon opposite Todd Solondz's Ira in his lesser known first feature film, Fear, Anxiety & Depression, theatrically released in 1989 through the Samuel Goldwyn Company, and was cited for her "comic flair" in Caryn James' New York Times review. She made her film directorial debut with Creating Karma, theatrically released in 2009. Her documentary produced with Harris F.B. Salomon, The Day After, was completed in 2010 with footage shot at Ground Zero on September 12, 2001. Following a screening series by New York Women in Film and Television called Life in the Aftermath of 9/11, it was included in the memorial library collection of the naval ship USS New York, and the archives of the Tribute WTC Visitor Center. She also co-wrote "The Collected Letters of Snaps" with Salomon. The adventures of a retired greyhound racing dog in New York.

== Film scores ==
- The Day After (2010)
- Creating Karma (2009) (additional music, theme, sitar, ukulele)
- The New Arrival (2000)
- Woman Found Dead in Elevator (2000)
- Smart House (1999) (additional music)
- Splinter (1999)
- Me and My Hormones (1996)
- Welcome to the Dollhouse (1995)
- The Doorman (1987)
- In the Night (1987)

== Discography ==
- Diane Murray (2000) (on selected songs: Arrangements, Bass, Guitar, Keys, Synth Drums)
- Premears Volume 1 (1999) (House is Jumpin included (co-written with Barry Goldberg, Joel Diamond and performed by Chane Andre) in this compilation of Disney Channel songs with various artists from original movies)
- IFC In Your Ear Volume 1 (1999) (Welcome to the Dollhouse Theme Song included in album of selected soundtrack music)
- Welcome to the Dollhouse (1996) (Official Soundtrack co-produced with Todd Solondz: Songs from film and by The Con Artists included: Various Artists)
- The Con Artists - Above the Stinkin' Law (1992)
