= Karen Lynn Gorney =

American actress (born 1945)

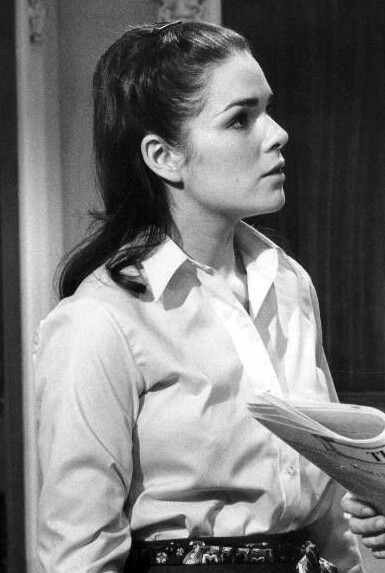
- Gorney in All My Children, 1970
- Born: January 28, 1945 (age 81); Los Angeles, California, U.S.
- Occupation: Actress
- Years active: 1962–present
- Father: Jay Gorney

Karen Lynn Gorney (born January 28, 1945) is an American actress who had roles in television shows and films including the soap opera All My Children and the movie Saturday Night Fever.

== Early life ==
Born in Los Angeles and raised in New York City, Gorney was one of three children of Jay Gorney, the Polish-born composer who wrote the music for the song about America's Great Depression, "Brother, Can You Spare a Dime?" Her family is Jewish. She attended the High School of Performing Arts and then earned a Bachelor of Fine Arts degree from Carnegie Mellon University and a Master of Fine Arts from Brandeis University. Karen is the sister of Daniel Gorney, and half-sister of author, professor, and physician Roderic Gorney, who has taught for many years at UCLA.

== Career ==
=== Early work ===
Gorney made her film debut as a teenage resident of a mental health treatment center in David and Lisa (1962). Her next work on the big screen came in 1970 with the film The Magic Garden of Stanley Sweetheart. From 1970 to 1974, Gorney played the role of Tara Martin on the soap opera All My Children. After she left the show, Gorney had agreed to return when her replacement, actress/writer Stephanie Braxton, decided to leave the show. She returned for the 1976–1977 season but was eventually fired as Tara and did not return to the show until almost 20 years later.

In 1977, Gorney co-starred in her third film, and biggest role to date, as Stephanie Mangano in Saturday Night Fever, alongside John Travolta. The next year, she appeared as a celebrity panelist on Hollywood Squares.

=== Return to film, stage, and TV ===
After a lengthy gap, during which she managed an art gallery in Manhattan, New York, Gorney eventually returned to acting in the early 1990s, appearing in small roles in such films as The Hard Way (1991), Ripe (1996), and Creating Karma (2006), and returning to All My Children during 1995 in cameo spots. More recently, she has guest-starred in a number of TV shows, including Law & Order, The Sopranos, and Six Degrees, as well as doing independent films and off-Broadway shows.

Due to her connection with disco music, and her popular role in Saturday Night Fever, she has been featured on a number of disco documentaries and specials, including Get Down Tonight: The Disco Explosion, which she co-hosted with Saturday Night Fever choreographer Deney Terrio for PBS. During the show, Gorney and Terrio dance to Bee Gees' hit single "More Than a Woman" as she did with co-star John Travolta in Saturday Night Fever back in 1977. She appeared on VH1's When Disco Ruled the World and was interviewed for the disco video documentary Disco: Spinning the Story. In 1997, Gorney had an uncredited role as an announcer in the film Men in Black.

She appeared in the UK on ITV1's lunchtime programme Loose Women (a topical debate programme from a woman's perspective) on 28 September 2007, helping to promote the 30th anniversary of the launch of the film Saturday Night Fever and the Bee Gees's new Greatest Hits album.

She was featured in the role of the Judge in the 2008 independent feature film Dear J.

Gorney is a long-time resident of New York City. In 2008, she appeared in the stage production Monsterface at the Irish Rep Theater. In October 2010, Gorney performed the role of "Belaria" in Frog and Peach Theatre Company's production of Cymbeline at the West End Theatre, in Manhattan, New York.

In 2016, she appeared as Esther in theater play From Silence by Anne Marilyn Lucas, it narrates the stories of Holocaust survivors and their families.

=== Music ===
Along with her acting work, Gorney is a singer and has released three albums: Used to Love You Madly, Hot Moonlight!, and The Dance of the Deadly's. She has performed at various jazz clubs and cafes.

== Filmography ==
=== Films ===
Year	Film	Role	Notes
1962	David and Lisa	Josette	
1970	The Magic Garden of Stanley Sweetheart	Alicia	Uncredited
1973	The Sting	Manicurist	Uncredited
1977	Saturday Night Fever	Stephanie Mangano	
1991	The Hard Way	Woman in Subway	
1996	Ripe	Janet Wyman	
1997	Men in Black	Announcer	Uncredited

=== Television ===
Year	Serial	Role	Notes
1970–1974, 1976–1977, 1995	All My Children	Tara Martin	
1992, 1998	Law & Order	Iris Corman / Monk	Episodes: "Cradle to Grave" & "Grief"
2000	Saturday Night Live	The Elvis Apostle	Episode: "Jackie Chan/Kid Rock" (Uncredited)
2006	The Sopranos	Judy	Episode: "Moe n' Joe"
2006	Six Degrees	Waitress	Episode: "A New Light"

== Discography ==
Year	Album
2002	Used to Love You Madly
2005	Hot Moonlight
2008	The Dance of the Deadly's
