= A Taste of Honey (album) =

Studio album by A Taste of Honey
- Released: July 1978
- Studios: Pasadena Sounds; Sound Factory West (Los Angeles)
- Genres: Soul; disco; funk
- Label: Capitol
- Producers: Fonce Mizell; Larry Mizell

A Taste of Honey chronology
A Taste of Honey (1978)	Another Taste (1979)

Professional ratings
Review scores
Source	Rating
AllMusic	4/5 stars
Christgau's Record Guide	C+

A Taste of Honey is the debut album by the American rhythm and blues group A Taste of Honey. It was produced by Fonce Mizell and Larry Mizell for Sky High Productions and included the number one pop, soul and disco classic "Boogie Oogie Oogie".

== Critical reception ==
Reviewing in Christgau's Record Guide: Rock Albums of the Seventies (1981), Robert Christgau wrote: "Those who cite 'Boogie Oogie Oogie' as definitive disco dumbness should reread the lyrics of 'Tutti Frutti' and think about the great tradition of the left-field girl-group novelty—'Mr. Lee,' 'Iko Iko,' 'Shame, Shame, Shame.' But though a couple of other songs here, notably 'Distant,' indicate that their pan may flash again, late converts are advised to seek out the single and wish they could buy the disco disc."

Alex Henderson of AllMusic also claimed, "Anyone who gives this self-titled debut album a serious listen will quickly realize you can't lump Honey in with the type of disco acts that were, in fact, invented by producers or A&R teams. To the more knowledgeable listener, it's also apparent that A Taste of Honey has as much to do with soul and funk as it does with disco."

== Track listing ==
A Taste of Honey track listing
No.	Title	Writer(s)	Length
1.	"Boogie Oogie Oogie"	Janice-Marie Johnson; Perry Kibble	5:37
2.	"This Love of Ours"	J.M. Johnson; Hazel Payne	3:20
3.	"Distant"	J.M. Johnson; Kibble	4:38
4.	"World Spin"	Kibble; Thurman Aldridge	3:42
5.	"Disco Dancin'"	Allan Barnes; John Malone	3:42
6.	"You"	Donald Ray Johnson; Payne	3:20
7.	"If We Loved"	Kibble; Aldridge	4:24
8.	"Sky High"	J.M. Johnson; Payne	5:04
9.	"You're in Good Hands"	Fonce Mizell	3:52

== Personnel ==
A Taste of Honey

- Janice–Marie Johnson – lead vocals, bass
- Hazel P. Payne – lead vocals, guitars
- Perry L. Kibble – keyboards
- Donald Ray Johnson – drums

Additional personnel

- Wade Marcus – string arrangements
- Larkin Arnold – executive producer

== Charts ==
=== Weekly charts ===
Weekly chart performance for A Taste of Honey
Chart (1978)	Peak position
Australia Albums (Kent Music Report)	81
US Billboard 200	6
US Top R&B/Hip-Hop Albums (Billboard)	2

=== Year-end charts ===
Annual chart performance for A Taste of Honey
Chart (1978)	Position
US Billboard 200	80
US Top R&B/Hip-Hop Albums (Billboard)	28

=== Singles ===
Chart performance for singles from A Taste of Honey
Year	Single	Chart	Position
1978	"Boogie Oogie Oogie"	Billboard Hot 100	1
1978	"Boogie Oogie Oogie"	Hot Soul Singles	1
1978	"Boogie Oogie Oogie"	US Dance	1
1978	"Boogie Oogie Oogie"	UK Official Charts	3
1978	"Disco Dancin'"	Hot Soul Singles	69
