= Broad Humor Film Festival =

The Broad Humor Film Festival is a film festival that takes place every year in Los Angeles, California. It focuses exclusively on comedic films written and directed by women. Begun in 2005, it is held yearly in the summer months and brings together female writers and directors for a weekend of screenings, readings and events with the aim of fostering greater opportunity for women as the creators of film content. The festival has film and screenplay competitions for both feature-length and short films. Projects can be narrative or documentary. In addition, the festival offers continuing support to festival filmmakers and writers through its Legacy Program, a series of initiatives encouraging alumnae to create and screen new work.

== History ==
Broad Humor was conceived in 2005 by filmmaker Susan diRende in response to the absence of women from a series of prominent forums for film industry recognition from awards such as the Oscars to film festivals such as the Los Angeles Film Festival, and in response to the low rate of employment of women directors in film and television. The festival came into being as a grass-roots effort and was named one of five top niche film festivals by MovieMaker Magazine in its first year.

The festival showcases work in which all the generative artists are female. Writing and directing must be done exclusively by women. Submissions for the festival come primarily from the United States and Canada, though submissions have been received from Europe, Asia and Australia as well.

The festival has been invited twice to Italy, screening a Broads Abroad program in Rome in 2007 and again in 2008 to the launch of the Tuscany Tourism Office programs for women, Benvenute in Toscana.

In 2014, Michelle Clay stepped into the position of Executive Director and senior programming for the festival. Founder Susan diRende remains active in growing the Broad Humor brand and continues to be a contributor to programming.

In the wake of the COVID-19 pandemic, the Broad Humor Film Festival was cancelled for 2020.
