= Deney Terrio =

American actor (born 1950)

- Born: Denis George Mahan; June 15, 1950 (age 76); United States
- Occupations: Choreographer, television personality, actor

Denis George Mahan (born June 15, 1950), better known as Deney Terrio, is an American choreographer and hosted the television musical variety series Dance Fever from 1979 to 1985.

== Early life and career ==
Raised in Titusville, Florida, Terrio achieved fame as the dance coach and choreographer for John Travolta in the movie Saturday Night Fever (1977). During his heyday with Dance Fever, he appeared in a number of films, including The Idolmaker (1980), Star Trek II: The Wrath of Khan (1982), A Night in Heaven (1983) and Knights of the City (1986), and guest starred on popular television series of the time, including The Love Boat. Throughout the 1990s, he toured nightclubs, performing with Motion and judging dance contests.

Terrio has appeared on several VH1 specials. He co-hosted the 2004 PBS special Get Down Tonight: The Disco Explosion, which featured many popular disco artists from the 1970s and actress Karen Lynn Gorney. During the show, Terrio and Gorney danced to Tavares’ live performance of "More Than a Woman", as Gorney had with Travolta in Saturday Night Fever.

Terrio hosted his own disco radio show, Saturday Night Dance Party, on the Sirius Satellite Radio network, and is a choreographer and competitor at regional Dancing with the Stars competitions.

== Lawsuits ==
In 1991, Terrio sued Merv Griffin, the producer of Dance Fever, for sexual harassment; the US$11.3 million case was later dismissed. In 2015, Terrio sued the toy company Hasbro in a federal court for creating an animated gecko and toy figurine named Vinnie Terrio, alleging that his publicity rights were violated by the gecko and figurine. In February 2016, Terrio and Hasbro settled his claims out of court.
