= Dance Fever =

- Genre: Musical variety
- Created by: Merv Griffin
- Presented by: Deney Terrio (1979–1985); Adrian Zmed (1985–1987)
- Narrated by: Freeman King (1979–1980); Charlie O'Donnell (1980–1987)
- Country of origin: United States
- Original language: English
- No. of episodes: 234

Production
- Executive producer: Merv Griffin
- Producers: Ernie Chambers (pilot, 1978); Paul Abeyta (1979–1980); Paul Gilbert (1981–1987)
- Camera setup: Multi-camera
- Running time: 22–24 minutes
- Production companies: 20th Century Fox Television; Anthony Productions (1979–1986); Merv Griffin Productions (1979–1984); Merv Griffin Enterprises (1984–1987); January Enterprises (1986–1987)

Original release
- Network: Syndication
- Release: January 13, 1979 – September 5, 1987

Dance Fever is an American musical variety television series that aired weekly in syndication from January 1979 to September 1987.

Deney Terrio hosted the series until September 1985, when he was replaced by Adrian Zmed.

== Inception ==
The series was technically created by Merv Griffin, but his agent Murray Schwartz actually conceived the idea of a pilot which piggybacked on a special Merv Griffin Show salute to the movie Thank God It's Friday, which would feature top disco dancers from eight cities competing for a title. Casablanca Records had already paid for the set, so a pilot could be produced at a significant reduction. Merv's vision was to have frequent Griffin guest Deney Terrio as the host, and to have celebrities dancing with professional disco dancers. (In a sense, it was very similar to Dancing with the Stars.) But pilot show producer Ernest Chambers had no success convincing the stars who were approached to consent to the format. They were afraid they would look bad. On the Sunday prior to the show, director Dick Carson suggested that, since they already had the dancers for the Thank God It's Friday salute, they should select the top four couples from that show and have them compete on the pilot with celebrities as judges. He was quoted as saying "Nobody's ever going to see this thing anyway." Within a couple days, Sherman Hemsley, Barbi Benton, and Herve Villechaize were secured as the judges. After the Thursday night Griffin/Thank God It's Friday special was taped, show staffers Larry Strawther and Paul Gilbert were dispatched to lure the top four finishers to participate in the next night's pilot production, but to keep it a secret. That didn't happen, but despite some acrimony among the dancers, not helped by a one-night stand between a couple of dancers that caused a rift, the pilot was produced and ended up being sold. Another long-time Griffin staffer, Paul Abeyta, produced the show's first two seasons which were written by Tony Garofalo. Later seasons were produced by Paul Gilbert.

== Format ==
Each week, four dancing couples competed for a weekly cash prize of $1,000; Each couple performed their dance routine for 90–120 seconds and the celebrity judges scored them anywhere between 70 and 100 points, based on 4 categories: originality, showmanship, style, and technique. The couple with the highest average total score were the winners and advanced into the next round of competition. In the event of a tie, one set of celebrity scores was dropped in an effort to decide a winner; every fifth week was a semi-final show where those winning couples from the last four weeks competed for $5,000.

At the end of a 25-week competition, the five semi-final winners all came back to face off in the show's annual Grand Prix Finals for cash and prizes worth over $25,000 which included two brand new cars (one for each member of the winning dance team). In September 1984, the grand prize package was raised to $50,000.

Each week except for the year-end Grand Prix Finals, the show also featured a segment in which some of the top disco, pop, or R&B artists of the day would perform their latest hit.

== Cast and crew ==
Diane Day and Janet Jones appeared as Motion, Terrio's regular backup dancers. The show's announcer for the first two years was Freeman King; in September 1980 he was replaced by Charlie O'Donnell, who was the announcer on another Griffin show, Wheel of Fortune.

During Terrio's tenure as host, the show's theme was performed by a musical team called Triple "S" Connection.

== Revival ==
During the summer of 2003 a short-lived revival aired on the ABC Family Channel (now Freeform). These were one-hour episodes and they were hosted by Eric Nies. The three celebrity judges were Carmen Electra, MC Hammer and Jamie King.
