= Marty Angelo =

American television producer

Marty Angelo (born 1946 or 1947) is an American former television producer. worked in the entertainment business from 1965 to 1980 as a television producer (Disco Step-by-Step), record promoter, restaurant/nightclub owner and personal manager for rock 'n' roll bands (Raven and Rob Grill and The Grass Roots).

After a drug arrest in 1980 for cocaine possession, he served two years of a six-year federal prison sentence in Lexington, Kentucky, and in prison began a ministry, Marty Angelo Ministries. Upon his early release from prison in 1984, Angelo went on to work with various ministries such as, Faith Farm in southern Florida, Teen Challenge of Southern California, Prison Fellowship, and the Drug Abuse Foundation of Palm Beach County. Angelo is also the author of 29 books. He wrote the book Once Life Matters: A New Beginning, which Michael Lohan read when incarcerated.

Marty Angelo’s Once Life Matters Ministries, Inc. reached out to prisons/jails, rehabs, college campuses, troubled celebrities, politicians and to members of the military from 1981-2018.

Angelo officially retired in September of 2018.
