= A Taste of Honey (band) =

American band

- Origin: Los Angeles, California, United States
- Genres: Disco; adult contemporary; pop; funk; R&B
- Years active: 1972–1983
- Labels: One Way, Capitol
- Members: Janice-Marie Johnson
- Past members: Carlita Dorhan; Perry Kibble (deceased); Donald Johnson; Hazel Payne; Suzanne "Minnie" Thomas (deceased)
- Website: www.atasteofhoneymusic.com

A Taste of Honey was an American band formed in Los Angeles, California, in 1972 by Janice-Marie Johnson and Perry Kibble. In 1978, Johnson, with Hazel Payne, topped the US charts with the disco song "Boogie Oogie Oogie". After their popularity waned during the 1980s, Johnson went on to record as a solo artist and released the album One Taste of Honey. In 2004, Johnson and Payne reunited to perform on the Public Broadcasting Service (PBS) specials Get Down Tonight: The Disco Explosion and My Music: Funky Soul Superstars. In 2022, A Taste of Honey featuring Johnson kicked off the celebration of 50 years of impact in the music and entertainment industries. A Taste of Honey now consists of Johnson and other musicians.

== Biography ==
A Taste of Honey was formed in 1972. The band hailed from Los Angeles, California, United States. The members of the band consisted of Janice-Marie Johnson (vocals, co-writer, bass), Carlita Dorhan (vocals, guitar), Perry Kibble (keyboards, co-producer, co-writer) and Donald Ray Johnson (drums). Longtime friends Kibble and Janice-Marie Johnson were the original members of the band. Each had left a band to join forces, and after employing several drummers, they settled on Donald Johnson (no relation to Janice-Marie). Singer Greg Walker joined the band for a time before leaving in 1975 to join Santana. Carlita Dorhan left the band in early 1976, and Hazel Payne was added.

The band began to improve its sound over a period of six years prior to being discovered by Capitol Records. Touring cities outside Los Angeles, they also began doing United Service Organizations tours, with performances in Spain, Morocco, Taiwan, Thailand, the Philippines, South Korea and Japan. Upon returning to Los Angeles, while playing in a nightclub, they were spotted by record producers, Fonce and Larry Mizell, who convinced Capitol Records' then vice-executive-producer, Larkin Arnold, to give them an audition. They signed a five-album contract, and billed themselves after Herb Alpert's song, "A Taste of Honey". The first single, "Boogie Oogie Oogie", from their debut album A Taste of Honey, spent three weeks at number one on the Billboard Hot 100 in 1978, and sold two million copies. A Taste of Honey was awarded two platinum records for the single and album, and won the Grammy Award for Best New Artist at the 20th Grammys on February 15, 1979. Janice-Marie Johnson calls the single her "lifeline" and credits Capitol Records executive, Larkin Arnold, with ensuring they owned their own publishing. Their subsequent disco releases, such as "Do It Good" (number 79 in 1979) from Another Taste, and "Rescue Me" (1980) failed to attract attention, and by 1980 the group had become a duo consisting of Janice-Marie Johnson and Payne.

When recording their cover version of the Kyu Sakamoto song "Sukiyaki", from their third album, Twice as Sweet (1980), they resisted suggestions to turn it into a dance tune. As a ballad it brought them their second and final major hit of their careers in 1981, when it reached number one on the Billboard R&B and Adult Contemporary charts and number 3 on the Hot 100.

A Taste of Honey released their fourth and final album, Ladies of the Eighties in 1982. It featured their final Billboard Hot 100 single, "I'll Try Something New" (number 41). This cover of the Smokey Robinson and the Miracles hit from 1962 also went to number 9 on the R&B charts and number 29 on the Adult Contemporary.

While preparing to record their fifth album in 1983, Payne left the group and Janice-Marie Johnson went on to record as a solo artist to fulfill contractual obligations, releasing One Taste of Honey, which produced the single "Love Me Tonight", a minor hit on the R&B chart. Payne went on to become an international stage actress.

== Later career ==
Upon moving to Calgary, Alberta, Canada, in the early 1990s to play in local night clubs and to write music for a television production, Kibble married a local music teacher, Anne-Marie LaMonde, in 1993, and became stepfather to her three children, Natalie, Marci and Gregory Pilkington. Kibble died on February 23, 1999 of heart failure, at the age of 49.

Donald Ray Johnson continues to live and play blues in Calgary, where he also married a local. Johnson released several blues albums under his own name. The following year, Janice-Marie Johnson released her second solo album, Hiatus of the Heart. In 2004, Payne and Janice-Marie Johnson reunited for the first time in over twenty years to perform on the PBS specials Get Down Tonight: The Disco Explosion and My Music: Funky Soul Superstars.

In 1996, Janice-Marie Johnson reformed a new version of A Taste of Honey that included guitarist Suzanne "Minnie" Thomas. The pair worked off and on until Payne's return for a twenty year reunion concert in 2004.

Janice-Marie Johnson was inducted in the Native American Music Association Hall of Fame in 2008.

Guitarist Suzanne "Minnie" Thomas died on June 15, 2015, at the age of 60.

As of 2025, Hazel Payne is a member of the Three Degrees.

== Discography ==
=== Studio albums ===
Year	Title	Peak chart positions				Certifications	Record label
Year	Title	US	US R&B	AUS	CAN	Certifications	Record label
1978	A Taste of Honey	6	2	81	7	RIAA: Platinum; MC: Platinum	Capitol
1979	Another Taste	59	26	—	—		Capitol
1980	Twice as Sweet	36	12	—	—		Capitol
1982	Ladies of the Eighties	73	14	—	—		Capitol
1984	One Taste of Honey (Janice-Marie Johnson)	—	—	—	—		Capitol
"—" denotes a recording that did not chart or was not released in that territory.

=== Live albums ===
- Divas of Disco: Live (with CeCe Peniston, Thelma Houston, Linda Clifford, & France Joli) (2010, Pegasus)

=== Compilation albums ===
- Golden Honey (1984, Capitol)
- Anthology (1995, One Way)
- Beauty and the Boogie (1997, EMI)
- Classic Masters (2002, Capitol)

=== Singles ===
Year	Title	Peak chart positions										Certifications	Album
Year	Title	US	US R&B	US Dan	US A/C	AUS	CAN	GER	NL	NZ	UK	Certifications	Album
1978	"Boogie Oogie Oogie"	1	1	1	—	18	2	40	32	2	3	RIAA: Platinum; BPI: Silver; MC: Platinum	A Taste of Honey
1978	"Distant"	—	—	—	—	—	—	—	—	—	—		A Taste of Honey
1979	"Disco Dancin'"	—	69	—	—	—	—	—	—	—	—		A Taste of Honey
1979	"Do It Good"	79	13	72	—	—	—	—	—	—	—		Another Taste
1979	"Race"	—	—	—	—	—	—	—	—	—	—		Another Taste
1980	"Rescue Me"	—	16	77	—	—	—	—	—	—	—		Twice as Sweet
1980	"I'm Talkin' 'Bout You"	—	64	—	—	—	—	—	—	—	—		Twice as Sweet
1981	"Sukiyaki"	3	1	—	1	24	4	—	—	3	—	RIAA: Gold	Twice as Sweet
1982	"I'll Try Something New"	41	9	—	29	—	—	—	—	—	—		Ladies of the Eighties
1982	"We've Got the Groove"	—	75	—	—	—	—	—	—	—	—		Ladies of the Eighties
1982	"Sayonara"	—	—	—	—	—	—	—	—	—	—		Ladies of the Eighties
1984	"Love Me Tonight"	—	67	—	—	—	—	—	—	—	—		One Taste of Honey (Janice-Marie Johnson)
1984	"She's So Popular"	—	—	—	—	—	—	—	—	—	—		One Taste of Honey (Janice-Marie Johnson)
1984	"Boogie Oogie Oogie" (remix)	—	—	—	—	—	—	—	—	—	59		Golden Honey
"—" denotes a recording that did not chart or was not released in that territory.

== See also ==
- List of Billboard number-one singles
- List of artists who reached number one in the United States
- List of Billboard number-one dance club songs
- List of artists who reached number one on the U.S. Dance Club Songs chart
