= Boogie Oogie Oogie =

- One of standard artwork variants

Single by A Taste of Honey

from the album A Taste of Honey
- B-side: "World Spin"
- Released: 1978
- Recorded: 1978
- Studio: Pasadena Sounds (Los Angeles, California)
- Genre: Disco; funk
- Length: 5:37 (album version); 3:45 (single version)
- Label: Capitol
- Songwriters: Janice-Marie Johnson; Perry Kibble
- Producers: Fonce Mizell; Larry Mizell

A Taste of Honey singles chronology
"Boogie Oogie Oogie" (1978)	"Do It Good" (1979)

Official audio
- Boogie Oogie Oogie on YouTube

"Boogie Oogie Oogie" is a song by the American band A Taste of Honey from their 1978 debut album A Taste of Honey. Released as their debut single in the summer of 1978, the song became an extremely popular crossover disco hit. It topped the American pop, soul and disco charts in September 1978 and became the first certified Platinum single in the history of Capitol Records for selling over two million copies. It also became one of the most recognizable songs from the disco era. The lyrics call out to listeners to "boogie oogie oogie till you just can't boogie no more" and features Janice-Marie Johnson singing lead vocals while playing its iconic slap bass lines at the same time.

The group was awarded two platinum records for both the single and album and they won the Grammy Award for Best New Artist at the 20th Grammys on February 15, 1979. In June 2026, CBS News included the song in its list of the 250 essential American songs of the past 250 years.

Limited edition colored vinyl releases were issued in some nations. In Mexico, the record was red, and in France it was honey colored.

== Track listing ==
7-inch vinyl single

1. "Boogie Oogie Oogie" – 3:45
2. "World Spin" – 3:50

== Charts ==
=== Weekly charts ===
Chart (1978)	Peak position
Australia (Kent Music Report)	18
Canada Top Singles (RPM)	2
Canada Top Disco Singles (RPM)	1
Germany (Official German Charts)	40
Ireland (IRMA)	9
Netherlands (Dutch Top 40)	32
New Zealand (Recorded Music NZ)	2
UK Singles (Official Charts Company)	3
US Billboard Hot 100	1
US Hot Soul Singles (Billboard)	1
US Hot Disco Singles (Billboard)	1
US Cash Box Top 100	1

=== Year-end charts ===
Chart (1978)	Rank
Canada Top Singles (RPM)	28
New Zealand (Recorded Music NZ)	16
UK Singles (Official Charts Company)	26
US Billboard Hot 100	9
US Cash Box Top 100	7

=== All-time charts ===
Chart (1958–2018)	Position
US Billboard Hot 100	188
