= Kool & the Gang discography =

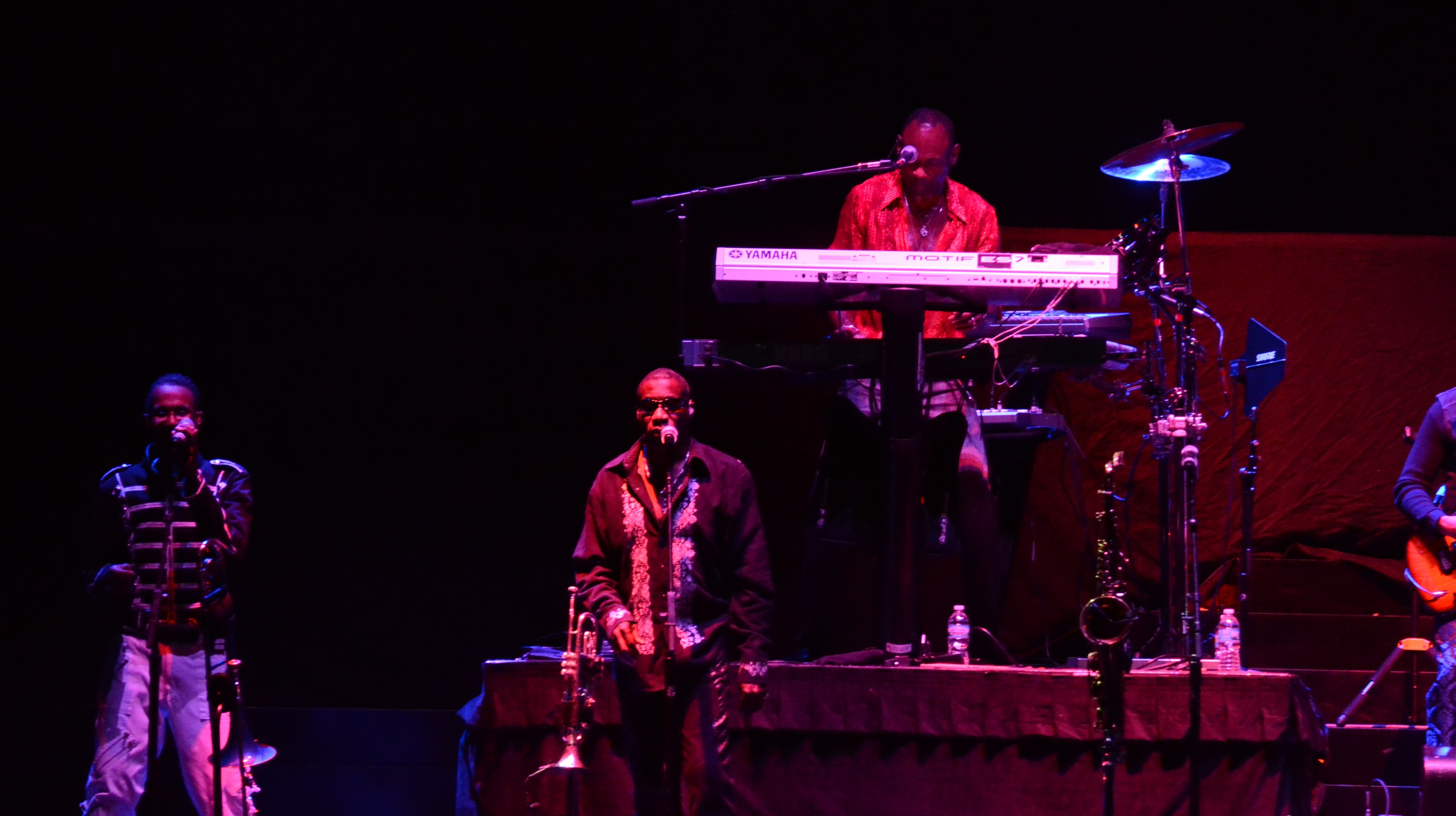
- Studio albums: 26
- Live albums: 4
- Compilation albums: 21
- Singles: 76
- Music videos: 25

This article presents the discography of American band Kool & the Gang.

== Albums ==
=== Studio albums ===
Year	Album	Peak chart positions										Certifications (sales threshold)	Record label
Year	Album	US	US R&B	US Jazz	AUS	CAN	GER	NLD	NZ	UK Pop	UK R&B	Certifications (sales threshold)	Record label
1969	Kool and the Gang	—	43	—	—	—	—	—	—	—	—		De-Lite
1972	Music Is the Message	—	25	—	—	—	—	—	—	—	—		De-Lite
1972	Good Times	142	34	—	—	—	—	—	—	—	—		De-Lite
1973	Wild and Peaceful	33	6	—	—	53	—	—	—	—	—	US: Gold	De-Lite
1974	Light of Worlds	63	16	—	—	93	—	—	—	—	—	US: Gold	De-Lite
1975	Spirit of the Boogie	48	5	18	—	—	—	—	—	—	—		De-Lite
1976	Love & Understanding	68	9	—	—	—	—	—	—	—	—		De-Lite
1976	Open Sesame	110	9	32	—	—	—	—	—	—	—		De-Lite
1977	The Force	142	33	—	—	—	—	—	—	—	—		De-Lite
1978	Everybody's Dancin'	—	71	—	—	—	—	—	—	—	—		De-Lite
1979	Ladies' Night	13	1	—	—	56	—	43	—	—	—	US: Platinum	De-Lite
1980	Celebrate!	10	2	—	72	7	—	13	20	—	—	US: Platinum; CAN: Gold	De-Lite
1981	Something Special	12	1	—	—	—	—	28	13	10	—	US: Platinum; UK: Gold	De-Lite
1982	As One	29	5	—	—	—	25	—	41	49	—	US: Gold	De-Lite
1983	In the Heart	29	5	—	—	—	19	17	32	18	—	US: Gold; UK: Silver	De-Lite
1984	Emergency	13	3	—	45	24	26	13	41	47	—	US: 2× Platinum; CAN: Platinum; UK: Silver	De-Lite
1986	Forever	25	9	—	71	75	14	—	49	—	—	US: Gold; CAN: Gold	Mercury
1989	Sweat	—	52	—	103	—	28	—	—	—	—		Mercury
1992	Unite	—	—	—	—	—	94	—	—	—	—		JRS
1996	State of Affairs	—	—	—	—	—	—	—	—	—	—		Curb
2001	Gangland	—	—	—	—	—	—	—	—	—	—		Eagle Music
2004	The Hits: Reloaded	—	—	—	—	—	26	—	—	56	21		Virgin/EMI
2007	Still Kool	—	31	—	—	—	—	—	—	—	—	FRA: Platinum	New Door
2013	Kool for the Holidays	—	—	—	—	—	—	—	—	—	—		ATO
2021	Perfect Union	—	—	—	—	—	—	—	—	—	—		Omnivore
2023	People Just Wanna Have Fun	—	—	—	—	—	—	—	—	—	—		
"—" denotes a recording that did not chart or was not released in that territory.

=== Live albums ===
Year	Album	Peak chart positions		Record label
Year	Album	US Pop	US R&B	Record label
1971	Live at the Sex Machine	122	6	De-Lite
1971	Live at PJ's	171	24	De-Lite
1998	Greatest Hits Live	—	—	Rhino
"—" denotes a recording that did not chart or was not released in that territory.

=== Compilation albums ===
Year	Album	Peak chart positions						Certifications (sales threshold)	Record label
Year	Album	US Pop	US R&B	US Jazz	GER	NLD	UK	Certifications (sales threshold)	Record label
1971	The Best of Kool and the Gang	157	32	—	—	—	—		De-Lite
1974	Kool Jazz	187	26	14	—	—	—		De-Lite
1975	Kool & the Gang Greatest Hits!	81	21	—	—	—	—		De-Lite
1977	Hollywood Swinging/Summer Madness	—	—	—	—	—	—		De-Lite
1978	Kool & the Gang Spin Their Top Hits		—	—	—	—	—		De-Lite
1983	Twice as Kool: The Hits of Kool & the Gang	—	—	—	—	—	4	UK: Gold	De-Lite
1984	The Very Best of Kool & the Gang: Let's Go Dancing	—	—	—	—	21	—		Disques Vogue
1988	Everything's Kool & the Gang: Greatest Hits & More	109	58	—	17	73	—		Mercury
1988	The Singles Collection	—	—	—	—	—	28	UK: Gold	De-Lite
1990	The Very Best of Kool & the Gang	—	—	—	—	22	—		Arcade
1990	Kool Love	—	—	—	—	—	50		Telstar
1993	The Best of Kool & the Gang: 1969–1976	—	—	—	—	—	—		Mercury
1994	Celebration: The Best of Kool & the Gang: 1979–1987	—	—	—	—	—	—	UK: Gold	Mercury
1994	Anthology	—	—	—	—	—	—	FRA: 2× Gold	Mercury
1999	The Very Best of Kool & the Gang	—	—	—	—	—	—		Mercury
1999	12" Collection & More	—	—	—	—	—	—		Mercury
2000	The Millennium Collection: The Best of Kool & the Gang	—	—	—	—	—	—		Mercury
2002	Kool Funk Essentials	—	—	—	—	—	—		Charly
2005	Gold	—	—	—	—	—	—		Mercury
2011	Icons	—	—	—	—	—	—		Mercury
2025	Greatest Hits	—	—	—	—	—	—		Mercury
"—" denotes a recording that did not chart or was not released in that territory.

== Singles ==
Year	Title	Peak chart positions										Certifications	Album
Year	Title	US	US R&B	US Dan	AUS	CAN	GER	IRE	NLD	NZ	UK	Certifications	Album
1969	"Kool and the Gang"	59	19	—	—	81	—	—	—	—	—		Kool and the Gang
1969	"The Gang's Back Again" (A-side)	85	39	—	—	—	—	—	—	—	—		Kool and the Gang
1969	"Kool's Back Again" (B-side)	—	37	—	—	68	—	—	—	—	—		Kool and the Gang
1969	"Let the Music Take Your Mind"	78	19	—	—	—	—	—	—	—	—		Kool and the Gang
1970													Kool and the Gang
1970	"Kool It (Here Comes the Fuzz)" / "Can't Stop (Doing It To You)" (non-album B-side)	—	—	—	—	—	—	—	—	—	—		Live at the Sex Machine
1970	"Funky Man"	87	16	—	—	—	—	—	—	—	—		Live at the Sex Machine
1971	"Who's Gonna Take the Weight (Part One)"	113	28	—	—	—	—	—	—	—	—		Live at the Sex Machine
1971	"I Want to Take You Higher"	105	35	—	—	—	—	—	—	—	—		Live at the Sex Machine
1971	"N.T. Part I"	—	—	—	—	—	—	—	—	—	—		Live at PJ's
1972	"Love the Life You Live, Part I"	107	31	—	—	—	—	—	—	—	—		Music Is the Message
1972	"Music Is the Message (Part 1)"	—	—	—	—	—	—	—	—	—	—		Music Is the Message
1972	"Funky Granny"	—	—	—	—	—	—	—	—	—	—		Music Is the Message
1972	"Good Times"	—	—	—	—	—	—	—	—	—	—		Good Times
1973	"Country Junky"	—	—	—	—	—	—	—	—	—	—		Good Times
1973	"Funky Stuff"	29	5	—	—	—	—	—	—	—	57 (Note: Chart position is from the official UK "Breakers List".)		Wild and Peaceful
1973	"Jungle Boogie"	4	2	—	—	29	45	—	—	—	53	RIAA: Platinum	Wild and Peaceful
1974	"Hollywood Swinging"	6	1	—	—	15	—	—	—	—	—	RIAA: Gold	Wild and Peaceful
1974	"Higher Plane"	37	1	—	—	73	—	—	—	—	—		Light of Worlds
1974	"Rhyme Tyme People"	63	3	—	—	—	—	—	—	—	—		Light of Worlds
1975	"Spirit of the Boogie" (A-side)	35	1	—	71	—	—	—	—	—	58		Spirit of the Boogie
1975	"Summer Madness" (B-side)	35	36	—	—	—	—	—	—	—		RIAA: Gold	Spirit of the Boogie
1975	"Caribbean Festival"	55	6	—	—	—	—	—	—	—	—		Spirit of the Boogie
1976	"Love and Understanding (Come Together)"	77	8	—	—	—	—	—	—	—	—		Love & Understanding
1976	"Universal Sound"	101	71	—	—	—	—	—	—	—			Love & Understanding
1976	"Open Sesame – Part 1"	55	6	13	—	70	—	—	—	—	—		Open Sesame
1977	"Super Band"	101	17	—	—	—	—	—	—	—	52		Open Sesame
1978	"Slick Superchick"	102	19	—	—	—	—	—	—	—	—		The Force
1978	"A Place in Space"	—	—	—	—	—	—	—	—	—	—		The Force
1978	"I Like Music"	—	—	—	—	—	—	—	—	—	—		Everybody's Dancin'
1978	"Everybody's Dancin'"	—	65	—	—	—	—	—	—	—	—		Everybody's Dancin'
1979	"Ladies' Night"	8	1	5	—	4	18	—	12	—	9	RIAA: Gold	Ladies' Night
1979	"Too Hot"	5	3	—	—	18	—	—	—	—	23	RIAA: Gold	Ladies' Night
1980	"Hangin' Out"	103	36	—	—	—	53	—	80	—	52		Ladies' Night
1980	"Celebration"	1	1	1	33	1	17	18	2	1	7	RIAA: 3× Platinum; BPI: Platinum; MC: Platinum	Celebrate!
1981	"Take It to the Top"	—	11	1	—	63	63	—	—	—	15		Celebrate!
1981	"Jones vs. Jones"	39	33	—	—	—	—	17	—	—	17		Celebrate!
1981	"Take My Heart (You Can Have It If You Want It)"	17	1	16	—	—	39	27	—	41	29		Something Special
1981	"Steppin' Out"	89	12	16	—	—	—	—	—	12	12		Something Special
1981	"Get Down on It"	10	4	—	74	11	43	11	10	3	3	RIAA: Platinum; BPI: Platinum	Something Special
1982	"Big Fun"	21	6	—	—	—	40	16	30	40	14		As One
1982	"Let's Go Dancin' (Ooh La, La, La)"	30	7	—	—	—	49	8	14	34	6		As One
1982	"Hi De Hi, Hi De Ho"	—	—	—	—	—	—	23	—	29	29		As One
1983	"Street Kids"	—	78	—	—	—	—	—	—	—	—		As One
1983	"Straight Ahead"	103	49	—	—	—	—	—	11	—	15		In the Heart
1983	"Joanna"	2	1	—	45	15	18	4	35	7	2	RIAA: Gold; BPI: Silver	In the Heart
1984	"Tonight"	13	7	—	—	—	—	—	48	—	2		In the Heart
1984	"(When You Say You Love Somebody) In the Heart"	—	—	—	—	—	—	43	—	7	7		In the Heart
1984	"Misled"	10	3	9	8	32	46	—	—	—	28		Emergency
1984	"Fresh"	9	1	1	—	10	26	19	27	—	11	RIAA: Gold; BPI: Silver	Emergency
1985	"Cherish"	2	1	—	8	1	5	6	3	—	4	RIAA: Gold; BPI: Silver	Emergency
1985	"Emergency"	18	7	41	—	63	56	26	48	—	50		Emergency
1986	"Victory"	10	2	35	89	36	11	17	44	22	30		Forever
1987	"Stone Love"	10	4	41	94	69	18	29	13	—	45		Forever
1987	"Holiday"	66	9	—	—	—	24	—	—	—	—		Forever
1987	"Special Way"	72	24	6	—	—	—	—	—	—	—		Forever
1987	"Peace Maker"	—	78	—	—	—	—	20	—	—	—		Forever
1988	"Rags to Riches"	—	38	—	—	—	26	93	—	—	—		Everything's Kool & the Gang (Greatest Hits & More)
1988	"Strong"	—	53	—	—	—	61	—	—	—	—		Everything's Kool & the Gang (Greatest Hits & More)
1988	"Celebration" (remix)	—	—	—	—	—	40	—	—	56	—		Everything's Kool & the Gang (Greatest Hits & More)
1989	"Raindrops"	—	27	—	—	—	42	—	—	—	—		Sweat
1989	"Never Give Up" / "Amor Amore" (non-album B-side)	—	74	—	—	—	—	—	—	—	—		Sweat
1992	"Unite"	—	—	—	—	—	—	—	52	—	—		Unite
1996	"In the Hood"	—	27	—	—	—	—	—	—	—	148		State of Affairs
1996	"Salute to the Ladies"	—	60	—	—	—	—	—	—	—	—		State of Affairs
2003	"Ladies Night" (with Atomic Kitten)	—	—	—	39	—	33	14	16	—	—		Ladies Night / The Hits: Reloaded
2004	"Fresh" (with Liberty X)	—	—	—	—	—	—	3	—	—	—		Being Somebody / The Hits: Reloaded
2004	"Too Hot" (with Lisa Stansfield)	—	—	—	—	—	—	—	—	—	—		The Hits: Reloaded
2004	"Get Down on It" (with Blue and Lil' Kim)	—	—	—	—	—	29	—	96	—	—		Best of Blue / The Hits: Reloaded
2005	"Hollywood Swinging" (with Jamiroquai)	—	—	5	—	—	—	—	—	—	—		The Hits: Reloaded
2005	"No Show" (featuring Blackstreet)	—	—	—	—	—	—	—	—	—	—		The Hits: Reloaded
2006	"Steppin' into Love"	—	96	—	—	—	—	—	—	—	—		Still Kool
2010	"Miss Lead" (featuring Towanna)	—	—	—	—	—	—	—	—	—	—		non-album
2016	"Sexy (Where'd You Get Yours)"	—	—	—	—	—	—	—	—	—	—		Perfect Union
2021	"Pursuit of Happiness" (rap version)	—	—	—	—	—	—	—	—	—	—		Perfect Union
2023	"Let's Party" (with Sha Sha Jones)	—	—	—	—	—	—	—	—	—	—		People Just Wanna Have Fun
"—" denotes a recording that did not chart or was not released in that territory.

== Music videos ==
Year	Title	Director	Album
1979	"Ladies' Night"	Unknown	Ladies' Night
1980	"Celebration"	James Herbert	Celebrate!
1980	"Love Festival"	Unknown	Celebrate!
1981	"Jones vs. Jones"	Unknown	Celebrate!
1981	"Take My Heart (You Can Have It If You Want It)"	Denis DeValance	Something Special
1981	"Steppin' Out"	Denis DeValance	Something Special
1981	"Get Down on It"	Denis DeValance	Something Special
1982	"No Show"	Denis DeValance	Something Special
1982	"Big Fun"	Denis DeValance	As One
1982	"Let's Go Dancin' (Ooh La, La, La)"	Denis DeValance	As One
1982	"Hi De Hi, Hi De Ho"	Denis DeValance	As One
1983	"Straight Ahead"	Nigel Dick	In the Heart
1983	"Joanna"	Joe Clarke	In the Heart
1984	"Tonight"	Jay Dubin	In the Heart
1984	"Fresh"	David Mallet	Emergency
1984	"Misled"	Felix R. Limardo	Emergency
1985	"Cherish"	Bill Mason	Emergency
1985	"Stone Love"	John Dahl	Forever
1986	"Victory"	John Dahl	Forever
1987	"Emergency"	John Dahl	Emergency
1988	"Rags to Riches"	Unknown	Everything's Kool & the Gang (Greatest Hits & More)
1988	"Strong"	John Lloyd Miller	Everything's Kool & the Gang (Greatest Hits & More)
2004	"Ladies' Night" (with Spanner Banner and Sean Paul)	Bill Schacht	The Hits: Reloaded
2004	"Fresh" (with Liberty X)	Franck Percher	The Hits: Reloaded
2022	"Let's Party" (with Sha Sha Jones)	Zane	People Just Wanna Have Fun
