= Twice as Kool: The Hits of Kool & the Gang =

Compilation album by Kool & the Gang
- Released: 1983
- Genre: Funk, jazz, R&B
- Label: De-Lite
- Producer: K & G productions, Eumir Deodato Kool and the Gang

Kool & the Gang chronology
Kool & the Gang Spin Their Top Hits (1978)	Twice as Kool: The Hits of Kool & the Gang (1983)	The Very Best of Kool & the Gang: Let's Go Dancing (1984)

Twice as Kool: The Hits of Kool & the Gang is a compilation double album by the funk band Kool & the Gang, released in 1983 on De-Lite Records. The album reached No. 4 on the UK Pop Albums chart. Twice as Kool: The Hits of Kool & the Gang has also been certified gold in the UK by the British Phonographic Industry.

== Critical reception ==
Professional ratings
Review scores
Source	Rating
AllMusic	3.5/5 stars

With a 3.5 out of 5 star rating Sharon Mawer of AllMusic declared " Twice as Kool also featured most of the early U.S. funk hits, but for an unknown reason omitted "Jungle Boogie." Obviously later compilations added the big ballad hits from the mid-'80s, but in the summer of 1983, Twice as Kool was an ideal introduction to a band, who, despite some big singles, had largely been overlooked."

== Track listing ==
Side One	Ladies' Night	George Brown, Kool & the Gang	6:32
Side One	Big Fun	George Brown, JT Taylor, Kool & The Gang, Robert "Kool" Bell, Ronald Bell	5:02
Side One	Celebration	Kool & The Gang, Ronald Bell	4:56
Side One	Take It To The Top	Kool & The Gang, Ronald Bell	4:15
Side Two	Summer Madness	Alton Taylor, Robert Mickens	4:15
Side Two	Open Sesame	Kool & The Gang, Ronald Bell	3:40
Side Two	Steppin' Out	JT Taylor, Kool & The Gang, Ronald Bell	4:42
Side Two	Night People	Kool & The Gang, Ronald Bell	3:42
Side Two	Street Kids	George Brown, JT Taylor, Kool & The Gang	5:08
Side Three	Ooh La, La, La, (Let's Go Dancin')	Amir Bayyan, J. Taylor*, Kool & The Gang	6:39
Side Three	Get Down On It (Extended Remix)	JT Taylor, Kool & The Gang, Ronald Bell	6:05
Side Three	Hi De Hi, Hi De Ho	JT Taylor, Kool & The Gang, Ronald Bell	3:58
Side Three	Funky Stuff	Kool & The Gang	3:02
Side Three	Hollywood Swinging	Kool & The Gang, Ricky West	4:36
Side Four	Jones Vs Jones	George Brown, Kool & The Gang	4:10
Side Four	Too Hot	George Brown, Kool & The Gang	5:02
Side Four	Take My Heart (You Can Have It If You Want It)	Claydes Smith, George Brown, JT Taylor, Kool & The Gang	5:04
Side Four	Hangin' Out	Kool & The Gang, Ronald Bell	5:00
