= Dennis "Dee Tee" Thomas =

American musician (1951–2021)

- Born: Dennis Ronald Thomas; February 9, 1951; Orlando, Florida, U.S.
- Died: August 7, 2021 (aged 70) Montclair, New Jersey, U.S.
- Genre: R&B
- Occupation: Musician
- Instrument: Saxophone
- Years active: 1964–2021
- Formerly of: Kool & the Gang

Dennis "Dee Tee" Ronald Thomas (February 9, 1951 – August 7, 2021) was an American alto saxophone player, flautist, and percussionist, who was a founding member of R&B/soul/funk band Kool & the Gang, and one of the few members to remain with the band for over 50 years, from its foundation in 1964 until his death in 2021.

== Biography ==
=== Early life ===
Born in Orlando, Florida, like most of his founding bandmates, Thomas attended Lincoln High School in Jersey City, New Jersey. In 1964, Thomas—then only thirteen years old—co-founded Kool & the Gang (initially called "The Jazziacs") with brothers Ronald Bell and Robert "Kool" Bell, and other friends.

=== Kool & the Gang ===
Thomas "was known as the quintessential cool cat in the group" due to his fashion sense and "laid-back demeanor". In addition to his musicianship, Thomas was "master of ceremonies at the band's shows" and "the group's wardrobe stylist", as well as being responsible for the group's revenues, which carried "in a paper bag in the bell of his horn". In the late 1980s, the group had discussed pursuing solo projects, with Thomas suggesting the band had considered splitting into twos or threes for various projects.

In 2024, Thomas was posthumously inducted into the Rock and Roll Hall of Fame, as a member of Kool & the Gang.

=== Personal life and death ===
Thomas married Phynjuar Saunders, with whom he had two children, including actress Michelle Thomas known for her roles in The Cosby Show, Family Matters, and The Young and the Restless. The couple lived in Montclair, New Jersey. Thomas died in his sleep at the age of 70.

== Discography ==
=== Studio albums ===
Year	Album
1969	Kool and the Gang
1972	Music Is the Message
1972	Good Times
1973	Wild and Peaceful
1974	Light of Worlds
1975	Spirit of the Boogie
1976	Love & Understanding
1976	Open Sesame
1977	The Force
1978	Everybody's Dancin'
1979	Ladies' Night
1980	Celebrate!
1981	Something Special
1982	As One
1983	In the Heart
1984	Emergency
1986	Forever
1989	Sweat
1992	Unite
1996	State of Affairs
2001	Gangland
2004	The Hits: Reloaded
2007	Still Kool
2013	Kool for the Holidays
2021	Perfect Union

=== Live albums ===
Year	Album
1971	Live at the Sex Machine
1971	Live at PJ's
1998	Greatest Hits Live
2002	Too Hot Live
2010	The Very Best-Live In Concert

=== Singles ===
Year	Single
1969	"Kool and the Gang"
1969	"The Gang's Back Again" (A-side)
1969	"Kool's Back Again" (B-side)
1970	"Kool It (Here Comes The Fuzz)"
1970	"Let the Music Take Your Mind"
1970	"Funky Man"
1971	"Who's Gonna Take the Weight (Part One)"
1971	"I Want to Take You Higher"
1971	"N.T. Part I"
1972	"Love the Life You Live, Part I"
1972	"Music Is the Message (Part 1)"
1972	"Funky Granny"
1972	"Good Times"
1973	"Country Junky"
1973	"Funky Stuff"
1973	"Jungle Boogie"
1974	"Hollywood Swinging"
1974	"Higher Plane"
1974	"Rhyme Tyme People"
1975	"Spirit of the Boogie" (A-side)
1975	"Summer Madness" (B-side)
1975	"Caribbean Festival"
1976	"Love and Understanding (Come Together)"
1976	"Universal Sound"
1976	"Open Sesame - Part 1"
1977	"Super Band"
1978	"Slick Superchick"
1978	"A Place in Space"
1978	"I Like Music"
1978	"Everybody's Dancin'"
1979	"Ladies' Night"
1979	"Too Hot"
1980	"Hangin' Out"
1980	"Celebration"
1981	"Take It to the Top"
1981	"Jones vs. Jones"
1981	"Take My Heart (You Can Have It If You Want It)"
1981	"Steppin' Out"
1981	"Get Down on It"
1982	"No Show"
1982	"Big Fun"
1982	"Let's Go Dancin' (Ooh La, La, La)"
1982	"Hi De Hi, Hi De Ho"
1983	"Street Kids"
1983	"Straight Ahead"
1983	"Joanna"
1984	"Tonight"
1984	"(When You Say You Love Somebody) In the Heart"
1984	"Fresh"
1984	"Misled"
1985	"Cherish"
1985	"Emergency"
1986	"Victory"
1987	"Stone Love"
1987	"Holiday"
1987	"Special Way"
1987	"Peace Maker"
1988	"Rags to Riches"
1988	"Strong"
1988	"Celebration" (remix)
1989	"Raindrops"
1989	"Never Give Up"
1991	"Get Down on It" (remix)
1992	"(Jump Up on The) Rhythm and Ride"
1996	"Salute to the Ladies"
2003	"Ladies Night" (with Atomic Kitten)
2004	"Fresh" (with Liberty X)
2004	"Too Hot" (with Lisa Stansfield)
2004	"Get Down on It" (with Blue & Lil' Kim)
2005	"Hollywood Swinging" (with Jamiroquai)
2005	"No Show" (featuring Blackstreet)
2006	"Steppin' into Love"
2010	"Miss Lead" (ft. Towanna)
2016	"Sexy (Where'd You Get Yours)"
2021	"Pursuit of Happiness" (Rap Version)
