= No Show (song) =

Single by Kool & the Gang

from the album The Hits Reloaded
- Released: 2005
- Genre: Funk
- Label: Edel
- Songwriters: Ronald Nathan Bell, Robert Earl Bell, Claydes Charles Smith, Robert Mickens, J.T. Taylor, George Melvin Brown, Eumir Deodato
- Producers: Eumir Deodato, Kool & the Gang

Kool & the Gang singles chronology
"Hollywood Swinging" (with Jamiroquai) (2005)	"No Show" (2005)	"Steppin' into Love" (2006)

"No Show" is a song recorded by R&B/Funk band Kool & the Gang for their 1981 studio album Something Special. A cover of the tune, featuring Blackstreet, appeared on the band's 2004 studio album The Hits Reloaded via Edel Records. Released as a single, this said rendition reached No. 36 on the US Billboard Adult R&B Songs chart.

== Compendium ==
No Show was produced by Eumir Deodato and Kool & the Gang. The song was also composed by George Brown, J.T. Taylor and Ronald Bell.

== Critical reception ==
Craig Lytle of Allmusic called No Show "a sorrowful account of a man left standing in the rain, waiting for the love that never showed." Marc D. Allan of the Boston Globe described the tune as a "sweet, soft ballad."
