= People Just Wanna Have Fun =

Studio album by Kool & the Gang
- Released: July 14, 2023
- Length: 59:32
- Labels: Astana; BFD; The Orchard
- Producer: George Brown

Kool & the Gang chronology
Perfect Union (2020)	People Just Wanna Have Fun (2023)

It's pure, straight-up Kool & the Gang. It's good to put out a wholesome message like ours. There hasn't ever been so much turmoil on this planet—people storming countries, constant mass murders here. There is no better reason to shine our light on people coming together and having fun.

— George "Funky" Brown on recording People Just Wanna Have Fun

People Just Wanna Have Fun is the twenty-sixth studio album by American funk band Kool & the Gang, released through Astana Music, BFD Records and The Orchard on July 14, 2023. Released to celebrate the band's 60th anniversary, it features the final recordings by Ronald "Khalis" Bell, Dennis "D.T." Thomas and George "Funky" Brown and the group is augmented by several guest vocalists.

== Reception ==
Editors at AllMusic rated this album 3 out of 5 stars, with critic Andy Kellman writing that "keeps the energy amiable throughout with a deliberate mix of body movers and romantic ballads" but criticizes the rapping and "wholly unnecessary social media and brand references". At The Arts Desk, Guy Oddy rated this release 2 out of 5 stars, criticizing and praising individual tracks and also noting the "rainbow of colours" that the guest singers bring to the band's sound.

== Track listing ==
No.	Title	Writer(s)	Length
1.	"Let's Party" (featuring Sha Sha Jones)	George Brown; Shawn McQuiller; Jones; Wolfgang Aiccholz	3:21
2.	"Movie Star"	Brown; Ami Miller; Jordan Raye	3:44
3.	"People Just Wanna Have Fun"	Brown; McQuiller; Larry Fergusson; Tim Horton; Jones; Soliq Tolbert; Louis Van Taylor	2:30
4.	"We Are the Party"	Brown; McQuiller; Aichholz; Amir Bayyan; Khalis Bell; Robert "Kool" Bell; Jermaine Bryson; Horton; Jones; Michael Ray; Shanice Ross; Van Taylor	4:13
5.	"VIP"	Brown; McQuiller; Lavell Evans; Fergusson; Horton; Miller	3:29
6.	"Na Na Na"	Brown; Miller; Tolbert	2:49
7.	"Go Get It"	Brown	2:17
8.	"Give Love"	Brown; Joana Knudsen; Raye	3:43
9.	"I Want It All"	Brown; Mario Dillard; Jones	3:31
10.	"Heaven's Gift"	Brown; Jones	3:47
11.	"Obsession"	Brown; McQuiller; Aichholz; Rick Martel; Raye	4:43
12.	"For the Woman in You"	Brown	3:20
13.	"My Weakness"	Brown; McQuiller; Walt Anderson; Evans	4:15
14.	"That's What I Love About You"	Brown; Jones	5:05
15.	"99 Miles to JC"	Brown; Clifford Adams; K. Bell; R. Bell; Horton; Dennis Thomas; Van Taylor; Curtis Williams	7:51
Total length:			59:32

== Personnel ==
Kool & the Gang

- Robert "Kool" Bell – bass guitar
- Ronald "Khalis" Bell – horns
- George "Funky" Brown – keyboards, production
- Dennis "D.T." Thomas – horns
- Amir Bayyan – guitar, bass guitar
- Curtis Williams – keyboards, horns
- Michael Ray – horns
- Shawn McQuiller – vocals
- Tim Horton – drums
- Lavell Evans – vocals
- Walt Anderson – vocals
- Rick Marcel – guitar, bass guitar, vocals

Additional musicians

- Sha Sha Jones – vocals
- Louis Van Taylor – horns
- Dominique Karan – vocals
- Ami Miller – rapping
- Ole' – rapping
