= Higher Plane (song) =

Single by Kool and the Gang

from the album Light of Worlds
- B-side: "Wild Is Love"
- Released: August 17, 1974
- Recorded: 1974
- Genre: Funk
- Length: 3:15
- Label: De-Lite Records
- Songwriters: Kool and the Gang & Ronald Bell
- Producer: Kool and the Gang

Kool and the Gang singles chronology
"Hollywood Swinging" (1974)	"Higher Plane" (1974)	"Rhyme Tyme People" (1974)

Audio video
- "Higher Plane" (album version) on YouTube

"Higher Plane" is the name of a hit song by R&B/funk band Kool & the Gang and written by Robert Earl Bell, Ronald Nathan Bell, George Melvin Brown, Robert Spike Mickens, Claydes Charles Smith, Dennis Thomas and Rick Westfield. From the album Light of Worlds, the single spent one week at number one on the R&B singles chart in October, 1974. It also peaked at number 37 on the Billboard Hot 100 singles chart. The song was included on the 1975 Kool & the Gang Greatest Hits! record.

Record World said that it has an "elevated dance groove."

== Track listing ==
De-Lite Records – DE-1562:

No.	Title	Writer(s)	Length
1.	"Higher Plane" (From the album Light of Worlds)	Kool and the Gang & Ronald Bell	3:15
2.	"Wild Is Love" (From the compilation album Kool Jazz)	George Brown & Robert Mickens	3:22
