= The Hits: Reloaded =

Studio album by Kool & the Gang
- Released: 2004
- Genres: Funk; Soul; R&B
- Length: 1:03:42 (Standard release); 1:57:54 (2-CD release)
- Label: Edel

Kool & the Gang chronology
Gangland (2001)	The Hits: Reloaded (2004)	Still Kool (2007)

The Hits: Reloaded
Review scores
Source	Rating
AllMusic	2.5/5 stars
Birmingham Mail	3/4 stars

The Hits: Reloaded is a studio album by the band Kool & the Gang issued in 2004 by Edel Records. It contains re-recorded versions of their songs in collaboration with other artists. The LP reached No. 19 on the Swiss albums chart, No. 21 on the UK R&B Albums Chart, No. 26 on both the Italian and German album charts and No. 30 on the French albums chart.

Three singles were released to promote the album. "Ladies' Night" featuring Atomic Kitten, "Fresh" featuring Liberty X and "Get Down on It" featuring Blue and Lil' Kim.

== Critical reception ==
The Birmingham Mail gave a 3 out of four star rating, saying "The celebrated funksters team up with a dazzling array of stars to cover some of their biggest tunes."

== Singles ==
In 2003, American R&B band Kool & the Gang asked English girl group Atomic Kitten to re-record "Ladies' Night" for their The Hits: Reloaded tribute album. The band subsequently asked them if they could include it on their then-untitled third album which they eventually named after the song in honor of the collaboration following Kool's approval. The re-recording was produced by Khalis Bayyan and Andy Whitmore. Whitmore is credited as a co-producer, while Ash Howes and Martin Harrington served as additional producers. "Ladies Night" was released as the lead single from The Hits: Reloaded and served as the second single from Atomic Kitten's Ladies Night album. The song peaked at number three in Spain, and reached number eight on the UK Singles Chart, outpeaking the original version of the track.

The song debuted and peaked at number 8 on the UK Singles Chart, becoming Atomic Kitten's first single to not reach the top 5 in over two years. It stayed in the top 40 for eight weeks, three of which were in the top ten. In 2021, the Official Charts Company ranked the song as the band's eight seventh-selling single in the United Kingdom – ahead of previous single "If You Come to Me," making it the biggest-selling single from Ladies Night.

In Spain, "Ladies Night" was Atomic Kitten's only top ten hit peaking at number three; it lasted three weeks in the top ten of the Spanish Singles Chart. The song reached the top twenty in Ireland, the Netherlands, Flanders and Denmark, and became a top-40 hit in German-speaking Europe, peaking at number 33 in Germany, number 32 in Austria and number 38 in Switzerland. In Oceania, the song did not do as well as their previous singles. "Ladies Night" was not released in New Zealand, where their previous single "If You Come to Me" had reached the top 10, and it managed to peak at only number 39 in Australia, becoming their last single to reach the top 50 there.

A music video for "Ladies Night" was directed by Cameron Casey. The video begins with many people anxiously crowded around the entrance of a club, trying to get in. Suddenly a pink plasma waves sweeps through the middle of the crowd, from the door, pushing them off to either side. The group head into the Kitten Club, and the crowd follows them in, until only the bouncer is left standing outside. In the well-lit club, the group groove about and sing, a great deal of which is on a pure white discothèque dance floor. They primarily dance in a row, with two rows of men behind them, though occasionally they are straddling the fellows, or performing other dance moves with them.

A second single "Fresh" was re-recorded with English-Irish pop group Liberty X in 2004, to feature on Kool & the Gang's re-recorded greatest hits compilation, The Hits: Reloaded. The new version of the song features Liberty X on vocals, with Kool & the Gang merely playing the instruments. Thus, due to the popularity of this version, it was released as a single in certain European countries on April 14, 2004. Despite its success across Europe, the single was never released in Liberty X's home country, the United Kingdom. Subsequently, Fresh appeared as a bonus track on the Liberty X album Being Somebody in Japan, as well as appearing on certain European editions. At the time of the single's release, the band were in a dispute with their British record label, V2 Records, and thus, it was decided that the single would not be released in the band's home country. The band's version of "Fresh" was produced by band member Tony Lundon, who also went on to produce the band's follow-up hit single, "Song 4 Lovers". Despite this, "Fresh" was regarded as one of the band's best cover versions. The track peaked at number three in Germany, number 12 in France and number 55 in Spain. The music video for the single was recorded in late 2003, and features Liberty X playing to an audience in a club, all supported by mics and surrounded by a crowd of the group's fans. Although the video does not feature a vocal appearance from Kool & The Gang, they appear as guests inside the club, charming a woman who has arrived in search of a man. The video received a small amount of airplay on British music channels, but was often, as is with its upload to the band's official YouTube channel, credited to Liberty X featuring Kool & The Gang, whereas the official release credits the two artists the other way around.

In 2004, British pop group Blue recorded the song "Get Down on It" as a collaboration with Kool & the Gang and released it as the second single from their greatest hits compilation Best of Blue. This version also features American rapper Lil' Kim. Although the song did not chart in Blue's native United Kingdom, it became a moderate hit in mainland Europe, especially in Spain, where it reached number three and spent eight weeks in the top 20.

== Track listing ==
=== CD Version ===
No.	Title	Length
1.	"Ladies Night" (featuring Atomic Kitten)	3:08
2.	"Get Down On It" (featuring Blue & Lil' Kim)	4:15
3.	"Fresh" (featuring Liberty X)	3:08
4.	"Cherish" (featuring Ashanti)	4:26
5.	"Joanna" (featuring Blazin' Squad)	4:10
6.	"Too Hot" (featuring Lisa Stansfield)	4:30
7.	"Straight Ahead" (featuring Jamelia)	3:30
8.	"Steppin' Out" (featuring Beverley Knight)	4:17
9.	"Hollywood Swingin'" (featuring Jamiroquai)	4:14
10.	"Summer Madness" (featuring Youssou N'Dour)	4:05
11.	"Jungle Boogie" (featuring Redman)	3:23
12.	"Take My Heart" (featuring Blu Cantrell)	4:04
13.	"Ladies Night" (featuring Sean Paul with Spanner Banner)	3:38
14.	"Cherish" (featuring Natural)	4:33
15.	"Serious" (featuring Xavier Naidoo with Mousse T.)	4:30
16.	"Where Da Boogie At!" (featuring R.O.C with Da Prince Hakim)	3:39

=== 2CD Version ===
==== CD1 ====
No.	Title	Length
1.	"Ladies Night" (featuring Atomic Kitten)	3:08
2.	"Get Down On It" (featuring Blue & Lil' Kim)	4:15
3.	"Fresh" (featuring Liberty X)	3:08
4.	"Cherish" (featuring Ashanti)	4:26
5.	"Celebration" (featuring Lulu with London Community Gospel Choir)	4:13
6.	"Joanna" (featuring Blazin' Squad)	4:10
7.	"Too Hot" (featuring Lisa Stansfield)	4:30
8.	"Let's Go Dancin' (Ooh La La La)" (featuring Jimmy Cliff with Bounty Killer)	4:40
9.	"Straight Ahead" (featuring Jamelia)	3:30
10.	"Steppin' Out" (featuring Beverley Knight)	4:17
11.	"Hollywood Swingin'" (featuring Jamiroquai)	4:14
12.	"Stressin'" (Kool & The Gang)	4:47
13.	"Jones Vs Jones" (featuring Angie Stone)	4:46
14.	"Summer Madness" (featuring Youssou N'Dour)	4:05
15.	"Cherish" (featuring Natural)	4:33

==== CD2 ====
No.	Title	Length
1.	"Jungle Boogie" (featuring Redman)	3:23
2.	"Funky Stuff" (featuring Big Brovas)	3:25
3.	"Take My Heart" (featuring Blu Cantrell)	4:04
4.	"Ladies Night" (featuring Sean Paul with Spanner Banner)	3:38
5.	"Where Da Boogie At!" (featuring R.O.C with Da Prince Hakim)	3:39
6.	"In the Heart" (featuring D-Side)	3:12
7.	"No Show" (featuring Blackstreet)	5:58
8.	"Bigg Thangs" (featuring Da Prince Hakim)	4:09
9.	"Jazziacs at the Kool Jazz Café" (Kool & The Gang)	6:12
10.	"Jungle in My House" (featuring FM(23) with Rachid)	4:06
11.	"Misled" (featuring Tony Hadley)	4:09
12.	"Tonight" (featuring Indie Gregg)	5:25
13.	"Cherish" (featuring Natural)	4:33
14.	"Serious" (featuring Xavier Naidoo with Mousse T.)	4:30

=== Other versions ===
The album has also been released in several other configurations under other album titles such as With Kool & the Gang (2013) and Kool & the Gang and Friends! (2016).

== Personnel ==
Kool & the Gang

- Khalis Bayyan – keyboards, tenor saxophone, vocals
- Curtis "Fitz" Williams – keyboards
- Claydes Charles Smith – guitars
- Amir Bayyan – guitars
- Robert "Kool" Bell – bass guitar
- George "Funky" Brown – drums, vocals
- Dennis "Dee Tee" Thomas – alto saxophone, vocals
- Clifford Adams – trombone, trumpet
- Sennie "Skip" Martin – trumpet, vocals
- Shawn McQuiller – vocals

== Charts ==
Chart (2004)	Peak position
Belgium (Ultratop)	50
France	30
Germany	26
Italy	26
Switzerland (Hitparade)	19
UK R&B Albums	21
