= Light of Worlds =

- US LP variant of standard artwork

Studio album by Kool & the Gang
- Released: September 1974
- Recorded: 1973–1974
- Studios: Mediasound, New York City
- Genre: Jazz-funk
- Length: 35:06
- Labels: De-Lite; DEP-2014
- Producer: K. & G. Productions

Kool & the Gang chronology
Wild and Peaceful (1973)	Light of Worlds (1974)	Spirit of the Boogie (1975)

Singles from Light of Worlds
- 1. "Higher Plane" Released: September 7, 1974; 2. "Rhyme Tyme People" Released: January 4, 1975; 3. "Spirit of the Boogie / Summer Madness" Released: April 5, 1975

Professional ratings
Review scores
Source	Rating
AllMusic	3/5 stars
Rolling Stone	(favorable)
The Rolling Stone Album Guide	3.5/5 stars
Stereo Review	(favourable)

Light of Worlds is the fifth studio album by the American R&B group Kool & the Gang. Released in 1974, it was later remastered by Polygram and was a second success for the band, reaching number 16 in the R&B chart and number 63 in the pop chart. It was a landmark in the funk/jazz fusion genre of the 1970s.

"Summer Madness" was released as a single, with a follow-up titled "Winter Sadness" from Kool & the Gang's Spirit of the Boogie a year later. A vocal remake of "Summer Madness" was released on their 1993 album Unite titled "WKOOL/Summer".

== Background ==
Light of Worlds is regarded as Kool & the Gang's most spiritual and sophisticated work, produced in the wake of the success of their previous album, Wild and Peaceful. While it was their seventh album of original material, the band considered Light of Worlds their ninth LP (counting two compilations), and therefore consciously chose nine songs for the album to represent the then nine planets in the Solar System. The album contains rock-inspired funk set to jazz-informed playing with afrobeat influences and a tinge of analog synthesis.

== Track listing ==
All tracks are written by Kool & the Gang, with co-writing credits noted below.

Side one
No.	Title	Writer(s)	Length
1.	"Street Corner Symphony"	Khalis Bayyan	4:32
2.	"Fruitman"	Rick Westfield	5:19
3.	"Rhyme Tyme People"	Penni Phynjuar Saunders; Dennis "D.T." Thomas	3:19
4.	"Light of Worlds"	Claydes Charles Smith	4:21
Total length:			17:31

Side two
No.	Title	Writer(s)	Length
5.	"Whiting H. & G."	Bayyan	3:17
6.	"You Don't Have to Change"	Robert "Spike" Mickens	2:39
7.	"Higher Plane"	Bayyan	4:57
8.	"Summer Madness"	Robert Mickens; Alton Taylor	4:16
9.	"Here After"	Bayyan	2:54
Total length:			18:03 35:06

== Personnel ==
Adapted from liner notes

Kool & the Gang

- Ronald Bell – arrangements (tracks 1, 7, 9), piano (tracks 1, 4–7, 9), clavinet (tracks 1, 4, 5, 7), ARP synthesizer (tracks 1, 5–9), bass (tracks 1, 7), percussion (track 1), tenor saxophone (tracks 1–4, 7, 9), vocals (tracks 3–4, 6, 9), alto flute (track 5), Mellotron (tracks 6, 8–9), ARP 2600 (tracks 7–8), lead vocals (track 7), electric piano (track 9), kalimba (track 9)
- Robert "Kool" Bell – bass (tracks 1–8), vocals (tracks 6–7)
- George "Funky" Brown – drums (all tracks), percussion (tracks 1, 9), vocals (track 6), kettle drums (track 9), gong (track 9)
- Robert "Spike" Mickens – trumpet (tracks 1–3, 5, 7, 9), flugelhorn (track 2), vocals (track 6), arrangements (tracks 6, 8)
- Claydes Charles Smith – guitar (tracks 1–8), vibraphone (track 4), percussion (track 4), arrangements (track 4), conductor (track 4)
- Ricky West – piano (tracks 1–2, 7), lead vocals (track 2), arrangements (track 2), electric piano (tracks 5, 8)
- Dennis "D.T." Thomas – alto saxophone (tracks 1–3, 7), clavinet (track 3), congas (track 3), percussion (tracks 3, 5), lead vocals (track 3), arrangements (track 3)

Additional musicians

- Herb Lane – vocals (track 4), backing vocals (track 7)
- Alton Taylor – vocals (track 4), lead vocals (track 6)
- Penni Phynjuar Saunders – vocals (tracks 3–4)
- Richard Shade – backing vocals (track 7)
- Kenneth Banks – backing vocals (track 7)
- Al Pazant – trumpet (track 4)
- Ed Pazant – oboe (track 4), alto saxophone (track 4)
- Noel Pointer – strings (track 4)

Technical

- Producers – Kool & the Gang
- Engineers – Bob Clearmountain, Godfrey Diamond, Harvey Goldberg and Alec Head.
- Cover Design – Frank Daniel
- Liner Notes – Cleveland "Clevie" Browne
- Photography – Bernie Block, David Lartaud and Phil Willen.

Reissue

- Digital Remastering – Gary N. Mayo
- Package – Mitchell Kanner
- Liner Notes – Cleveland "Clevie" Browne

== Charts ==
=== Weekly charts ===
Weekly chart performance for Light of Worlds
Chart (1974)	Peak position
US Billboard 200	#63

=== Singles ===
Song	R&B chart	Pop chart
"Higher Plane"	No.1	No.37
"Rhyme Tyme People"	No.3	No.63
"Summer Madness"	No.36	No.35

== Certifications ==
Region	Certification	Certified units/sales
United States (RIAA)	Gold	500,000^{^}
^{^} Shipments figures based on certification alone.
