= Rags to riches (disambiguation) =

Rags to riches refers to a rise from poverty to wealth. It may also refer to:

- Rags to Riches (video game), a 1985 computer game for the Commodore 64
- Rags to Riches (horse), a thoroughbred race horse
- "Rags to Riches" (1953 song), a 1953 popular song by Richard Adler and Jerry Ross, popularized by Tony Bennett
- Rags to Riches (Kool and the Gang song), 1988
- "Rags2Riches" (song), a 2020 song by Rod Wave featuring ATR SonSon
- Rags to Riches (TV series), an American musical comedy drama series
- Rags to Riches (1922 film), a 1922 American drama film
- Rags to Riches (1941 film), a film directed by Joseph Kane
- "Rags to Riches", a track from The Blue Nile's 1984 album A Walk Across the Rooftops
