= Kool Jazz =

Compilation album by Kool & the Gang
- Released: 1973
- Genres: Funk; jazz; R&B
- Length: 1:14:59
- Label: De-Lite
- Producers: Gene Redd, Kool and the Gang

Kool & the Gang chronology
The Best of Kool and the Gang (1971)	Kool Jazz (1973)	Kool & the Gang Greatest Hits! (1975)

Kool Jazz is the second compilation album by the funk band Kool & the Gang, released in 1973 on De-Lite Records. The album reached No. 26 on the US Billboard Top Soul Albums chart and No. 14 on the US Billboard Top Jazz LPs chart.

== Critical reception ==
Professional ratings
Review scores
Source	Rating
AllMusic	4.5/5 stars

Chris Albertson of Stereo Review declared "This album, mostly instrumentals taken from four of their popular releases, shows them to be worthy of the serious jazz listener's attention. The compositions, all but Charles Lloyd's Sombrero Sam contributed by members of the group, reveal talents that some of the group's most popular hits obscure." AllMusic rated Kool Jazz 4.5 out of 5 stars.

== Track listing ==
Kool Jazz track listing
No.	Title	Writer(s)	Length
1.	"Breeze & Soul"	Kool & the Gang	5:31
2.	"Sea of Tranquility"	Kool & the Gang	3:35
3.	"Sombrero Sam"	Kool & the Gang	6:42
4.	"Lucky for Me"	Kool & the Gang	3:06
5.	"Duji"	Kool & the Gang	6:02
6.	"Stop, Look, Listen (To Your Heart)"	Kool & the Gang	8:20
7.	"North, East, South, West"	Kool & the Gang	3:41
8.	"I Remember John W. Coltrane"	Kool & the Gang	4:04
9.	"Wild and Peaceful"	Gene Redd	9:32
10.	"Winter Sadness"	Kool & the Gang	5:07
11.	"Summer Madness"	Kool & the Gang	8:02
12.	"Universal Sound"	Kool & the Gang	4:04
13.	"Messenger of Wisdom"	Gene Redd	5:46
14.	"Free"	Gene Redd	2:07
