= Rags to Riches (Kool and the Gang song) =

Single by Kool & the Gang

from the album Everything's Kool & the Gang (Greatest Hits & More)
- Released: 1988
- Genre: Funk
- Length: 3:53
- Label: Mercury
- Songwriters: Imani, Meekaaeel Muhammad
- Producers: Gabe Vigorito, Tony Prendatt (exec.), Khalis Bhayan, I.B.M.C

Kool & the Gang singles chronology
"Peace Maker" (1987)	"Rags to Riches" (1988)	"Strong" (1988)

Music video
- "Rags to Riches" on YouTube

"Rags to Riches" is a song recorded by R&B/funk band Kool & the Gang for their 1988 compilation album Everything's Kool & the Gang (Greatest Hits & More). Released as a single, the song reached No. 38 on the US Billboard Hot Soul Singles chart and No. 26 on the German Pop Singles chart.

== Background ==
"Rags to Riches" was composed by Imani and Meekaaeel Muhammad. The recording was produced by Khalis Bhayan and I.B.M.C.

== Critical reception ==
Robert K. Oermann of USA Today found "Rags to Riches" has "the rhythm expertise and potent singing we've come to expect from this durable act." Chris Heim of the Chicago Tribune also called Rags to Riches a "new song in the standard Kool mode."
