= Claydes Charles Smith =

American musician

- Born: Claydes Eugene Smith; September 6, 1948; Jersey City, New Jersey, U.S.
- Died: June 20, 2006 (aged 57) Maplewood, New Jersey, U.S.
- Genres: R&B
- Occupation: Musician
- Instrument: Guitar
- Years active: 1964–2006
- Formerly of: Kool & the Gang

Claydes "Charles" Smith (born Claydes Eugene Smith; September 6, 1948 – June 20, 2006) was an American musician best known as co-founder and lead guitarist of the group Kool & the Gang.

== Biography ==
=== Early life ===
Born in Jersey City, New Jersey, he was introduced to jazz guitar by his father in the early 1960s.

=== Kool & the Gang ===
In the late 1960s, he joined with Ronald Bell (later Khalis Bayyan), Robert "Kool" Bell, George Brown, Dennis Thomas and Robert "Spike" Mickens to become Kool & the Gang. His cool jazz stylings and octave runs, reminiscent of Wes Montgomery but uniquely his own, enriched the music of the group. His playing on the hit "Summer Madness" is a fine example of his work.

Kool & the Gang blended jazz, funk, R&B, and pop. The group remained popular from the 1960s through the 1980s.

Smith stopped touring in January 2006 due to illness.

In 2024, Smith was posthumously inducted into the Rock and Roll Hall of Fame, as a member of Kool & the Gang.

=== Personal life and death ===
Smith's family included six children: Claydes A. Smith, Justin Smith, Aaron Corbin, August Williams, Uranus Smith-Garay, and Tyteen Humes. He died in Maplewood, New Jersey, on June 20, 2006, aged 57. He is buried in Westfield, New Jersey's Fairview Cemetery.

== Discography ==
=== Studio albums ===
Year	Album
1969	Kool and the Gang
1972	Music Is the Message
1972	Good Times
1973	Wild and Peaceful
1974	Light of Worlds
1975	Spirit of the Boogie
1976	Love & Understanding
1976	Open Sesame
1977	The Force
1978	Everybody's Dancin'
1979	Ladies' Night
1980	Celebrate!
1981	Something Special
1982	As One
1983	In the Heart
1984	Emergency
1986	Forever
1989	Sweat
1992	Unite
1996	State of Affairs
2001	Gangland
2004	The Hits: Reloaded

=== Live albums ===
Year	Album
1971	Live at the Sex Machine
1971	Live at PJ's
1998	Greatest Hits Live
2002	Too Hot Live

=== Singles ===
Year	Single
1969	"Kool and the Gang"
1969	"The Gang's Back Again" (A-side)
1969	"Kool's Back Again" (B-side)
1970	"Kool It (Here Comes The Fuzz)"
1970	"Let the Music Take Your Mind"
1970	"Funky Man"
1971	"Who's Gonna Take the Weight (Part One)"
1971	"I Want to Take You Higher"
1971	"N.T. Part I"
1972	"Love the Life You Live, Part I"
1972	"Music Is the Message (Part 1)"
1972	"Funky Granny"
1972	"Good Times"
1973	"Country Junky"
1973	"Funky Stuff"
1973	"Jungle Boogie"
1974	"Hollywood Swinging"
1974	"Higher Plane"
1974	"Rhyme Tyme People"
1975	"Spirit of the Boogie" (A-side)
1975	"Summer Madness" (B-side)
1975	"Caribbean Festival"
1976	"Love and Understanding (Come Together)"
1976	"Universal Sound"
1976	"Open Sesame - Part 1"
1977	"Super Band"
1978	"Slick Superchick"
1978	"A Place in Space"
1978	"I Like Music"
1978	"Everybody's Dancin'"
1979	"Ladies' Night"
1979	"Too Hot"
1980	"Hangin' Out"
1980	"Celebration"
1981	"Take It to the Top"
1981	"Jones vs. Jones"
1981	"Take My Heart (You Can Have It If You Want It)"
1981	"Steppin' Out"
1981	"Get Down on It"
1982	"No Show"
1982	"Big Fun"
1982	"Let's Go Dancin' (Ooh La, La, La)"
1982	"Hi De Hi, Hi De Ho"
1983	"Street Kids"
1983	"Straight Ahead"
1983	"Joanna"
1984	"Tonight"
1984	"(When You Say You Love Somebody) In the Heart"
1984	"Fresh"
1984	"Misled"
1985	"Cherish"
1985	"Emergency"
1986	"Victory"
1987	"Stone Love"
1987	"Holiday"
1987	"Special Way"
1987	"Peace Maker"
1988	"Rags to Riches"
1988	"Strong"
1988	"Celebration" (remix)
1989	"Raindrops"
1989	"Never Give Up"
1991	"Get Down on It" (remix)
1992	"(Jump Up on The) Rhythm and Ride"
1996	"Salute to the Ladies"
2003	"Ladies Night" (with Atomic Kitten)
2004	"Fresh" (with Liberty X)
2004	"Too Hot" (with Lisa Stansfield)
2004	"Get Down on It" (with Blue & Lil' Kim)
2005	"Hollywood Swinging" (with Jamiroquai)
2005	"No Show" (featuring Blackstreet)
2006	"Steppin' into Love"

== Awards and nominations ==
Grammy Awards

Year	Nominee / work	Award	Result	Ref.
1975	Light of Worlds	Grammy Award for Best R&B Instrumental Performance	Nominated	
1979	"Saturday Night Fever (soundtrack)"	Grammy Award for Album of the Year	Won	
