= Everybody's Dancin' =

Studio album by Kool & the Gang
- Released: October 1978
- Genre: Disco, funk
- Length: 35:58
- Label: De-Lite
- Producer: Kool and the Gang, Ronald Bell

Kool & the Gang chronology
The Force (1977)	Everybody's Dancin' (1978)	Ladies' Night (1979)

Everybody's Dancin' is the tenth studio album by the American band Kool & the Gang, released in 1978. It peaked at No. 71 on Billboard's Top Black Albums chart.

== Reception ==
Professional ratings
Review scores
Source	Rating
AllMusic	3/5 stars

In 1978, despite their music's recent feature in Saturday Night Fever, Kool & the Gang were "at a low point" of commercial decline.

The Rolling Stone wrote that the band struggled to maintain its relevance in the disco world, despite a prominent horn section. Speaking of the circa-1978 era, drummer George "Funky" Brown stated, "We tried our version of disco. It didn't work."

The Detroit Free Press opined that "Kool and the Gang have gone bland," noting that "they've joined the disco lemmings...The edge has gone".

== Track listing ==
Side one
No.	Title	Writer(s)	Length
1.	"Everybody's Dancin'"	Ronald Bell	8:02
2.	"Dancin' Shoes"	Claydes Smith	3:54
3.	"Big Chief Funkum"	Ronald Bell	4:50

Side two
No.	Title	Writer(s)	Length
1.	"I Like Music"	Ronald Bell	3:37
2.	"You Deserve a Break Today"	Ronald Bell, Deborah Bell	3:36
3.	"At the Party"	Ronald Bell	3:30
4.	"Stay Awhile"	George Brown, Cynthia Huggins	4:43
5.	"It's All You Need"	Claydes Smith	3:13
6.	"Peace to the Universe"	Claydes Smith	0:33
