= Hollywood Swinging =

1974 funk song by Kool & the Gang

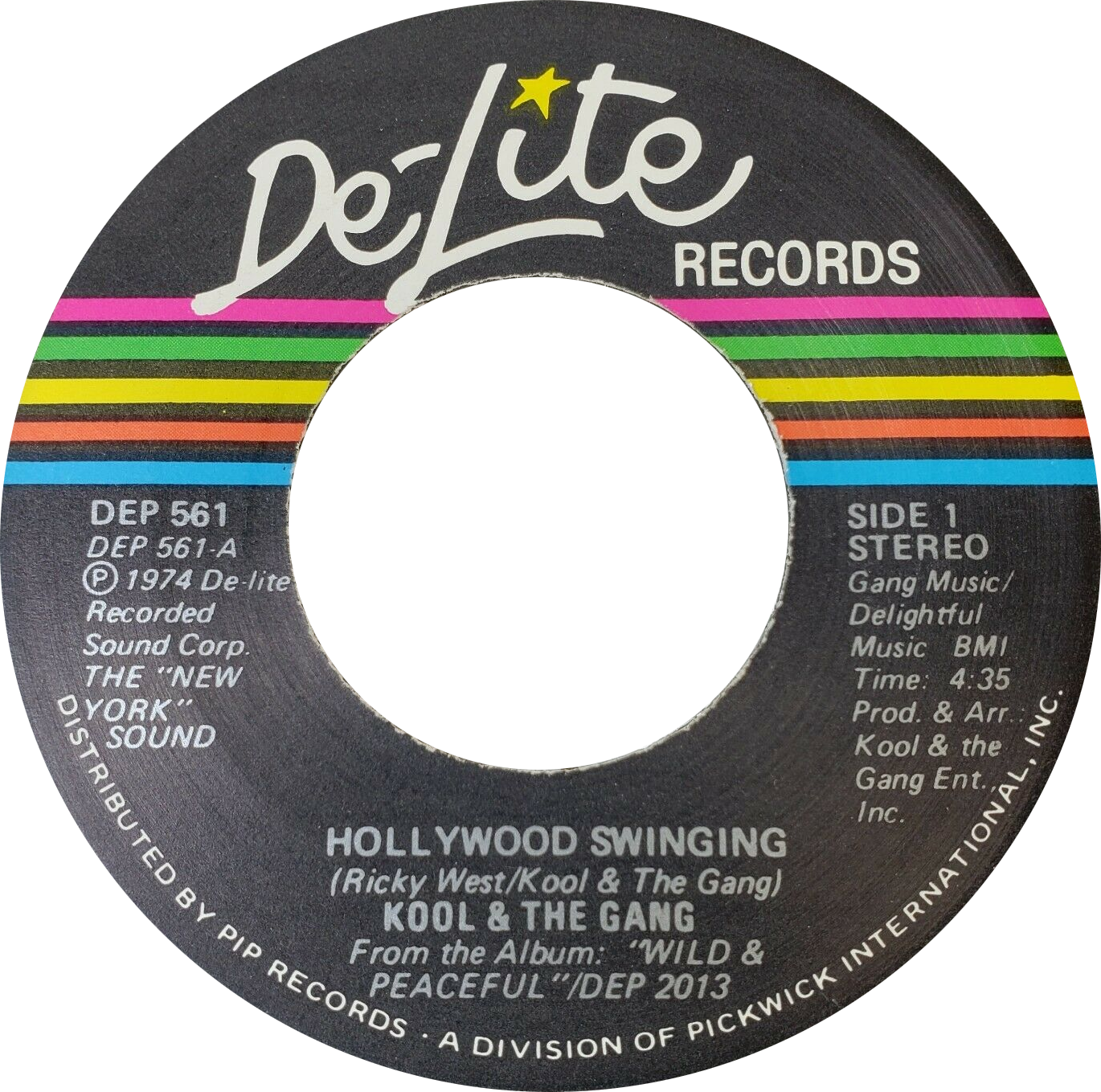
- One of side-A labels of US single

Single by Kool & the Gang

from the album Wild and Peaceful
- B-side: "Dujii"
- Released: April 6, 1974
- Recorded: 1973
- Studio: Mediasound (New York City)
- Genre: Funk
- Length: 4:35
- Label: De-Lite
- Songwriters: Bell; Bell; Brown; Mickens; Smith; Thomas; Westfield
- Producer: Kool & the Gang

Kool & the Gang singles chronology
"Jungle Boogie" (1973)	"Hollywood Swinging" (1974)	"Higher Plane" (1974)

Audio video
- "Hollywood Swinging" on YouTube

"Hollywood Swinging" is a 1974 song by American R&B, soul and funk band Kool & the Gang from their fourth studio album Wild and Peaceful (1973). It was written by Robert "Kool" Bell, Ronald Bell, George M. Brown, Robert "Spike" Mickens, Claydes Charles Smith, Dennis R. Thomas and Rick A. Westfield. Keyboardist Rick Westfield performed lead vocals on the track.

"Hollywood Swinging" was the group's first number one R&B single, reaching that position in June 1974. The single was a successful crossover hit, peaking at number 6 on the Billboard Hot 100 singles chart as well.

In 2015, Nile Rodgers stated that Chic's 1979 song "Good Times" was partly inspired by "Hollywood Swinging". Rodgers is the cousin of Robert Mickens.

== Track listing ==
De-Lite – DE-561:

No.	Title	Writer(s)	Length
1.	"Hollywood Swinging" (From the album Wild and Peaceful)	Kool and the Gang; Rick Westfield	4:35
2.	"Dujii" (From the compilation album Kool Jazz)	Westfield	6:02

== Critical reception ==
Record World said "These guys have to be funk personified. Make way for their next million seller."

Daryl Easlea of the BBC wrote "Hollywood Swinging packs appropriate punch". Andrew Hamilton of AllMusic called Hollywood Swinging "a slightly faster than mid-tempo song with whistles, festive ambiance and lead vocals by keyboardist Ricky West."

== Charts ==
Chart (1974)	Peak position
US Billboard Hot 100	6
US Hot Soul Singles (Billboard)	1

== Certifications ==
Region	Certification	Certified units/sales
United States (RIAA)	Gold	1,000,000^{^}
^{^} Shipments figures based on certification alone.

== Notable appearances in other media ==
"Hollywood Swinging" appears in the action-adventure game Grand Theft Auto: San Andreas (2004) as well as the game's soundtrack during the dance sequences in the mission "Life's a Beach".

In 2005, the song played during a segment at the 77th Academy Awards, in which host Chris Rock asked African Americans if they had seen any of the Best Picture nominees. In 2016, Rock reprised the segment at the 88th Academy Awards, and once again used "Hollywood Swinging" as the background music.

The song appears in the Academy Award-winning documentary O.J.: Made in America in a montage detailing O. J. Simpson's rise to fame in the late 1970s.

The song is included in commercials for New Balance's "We Got Now" advertising campaign. It was one of the official theme songs of WWE WrestleMania 39, hosted at SoFi Stadium in Inglewood, California. This was used as a theme song for the revival of the FOX primetime game show Don't Forget the Lyrics! hosted by actress Niecy Nash in 2022.

== Covers versions and samples ==
The song has been sampled in several rap songs, including:

- "Let Me Clear My Throat" by DJ Kool
- "Another Slob Bites the Dust" by Bloods & Crips
- "Compton Swangin'" by B.G. Knocc Out and Dresta
- "Feel So Good" by Mase
- "Money in the Ghetto" by Too Short
- "Inglewood Swangin'" by Mack 10
- "Got 2 Go" by Redhead Kingpin and the F.B.I. featuring Kwame
- "Bag of Glue" by the Rubberbandits
- "2 Step" by 2 Chainz

Brian Culbertson featuring Musiq Soulchild and Gerald Albright covered "Hollywood Swinging" on Culbertson's tenth studio album Bringing Back the Funk (2008). In 1982, the Big Boys released the Fun, Fun, Fun... EP containing a cover of "Hollywood Swinging".

The group Brockhampton covered "Hollywood Swinging" in 2022 for the soundtrack of the animated film Minions: The Rise of Gru, which consisted primarily of contemporary artists covering 1970s music.

== Jamiroquai versions ==
"Hollywood Swinging"

Single by Kool & the Gang featuring Jamiroquai

from the album In-Store Jam and The Hits: Reloaded
- B-side: "Cherish"; "Get Down on It"; "Ladies Night"
- Released: November 6, 1997 (Jamiroquai); December 8, 2005 (Kool & the Gang featuring Jamiroquai)
- Recorded: 1997 (Jamiroquai); 2004 (Kool & the Gang featuring Jamiroquai)
- Genre: Funk; disco; pop; alternative rock
- Length: 4:47; 4:28
- Label: Edel
- Songwriters: Bell; Bell; Brown; Mickens; Smith; Thomas; Westfield
- Producer: Jay Kay

Jamiroquai singles chronology
"(Don't) Give Hate a Chance" (2005)	"Hollywood Swinging" (2005)	"Runaway" (2006)

Audio video
- "Hollywood Swinging" (live) on YouTube; "Hollywood Swinging" (with Kool & the Gang) on YouTube

A version of "Hollywood Swinging" was originally recorded by English acid jazz and funk band Jamiroquai in 1997. The group released the recording, alongside three other tracks, on an exclusive Japanese MiniDisc entitled "Hollywood Swinging", which was available from November 6, 1997. This version also appeared on the group's compilation album, In-Store Jam, which was only available for purchase in the US. In 2004, Kool & the Gang re-recorded "Hollywood Swinging" as a collaboration with the group, releasing it on December 8, 2005. The song was released as a single from their album of re-recorded songs, The Hits: Reloaded, and was released on several different formats. Despite strong radio airplay, the song failed to chart anywhere.

=== Track listing ===
==== 1997 ====
Japanese mini single

1. "Virtual Insanity" (Radio Edit) – 3:54
2. "When You Gonna Learn" (Didgeridoo) – 3:48
3. "Too Young to Die" (Radio Edit) – 3:19
4. "Hollywood Swinging" – 4:47

==== 2005 ====
Spanish CD single

1. "Hollywood Swinging" (feat. Jamiroquai) – 4:28

European CD single

1. "Hollywood Swinging" (feat. Jamiroquai) (Ralphi Rosario's Old School Vocal) – 7:30
2. "Hollywood Swinging" (feat. Jamiroquai) (Ralphi Rosario's Hollywood Rock Dub) – 9:10

UK CD single

1. "Hollywood Swinging" (feat. Jamiroquai) – 4:28
2. "Cherish" (feat. Ashanti)
3. "Get Down on It" (feat. Blue & Lil' Kim)
4. "Ladies Night" (feat. Sean Paul & Spanner Banner)

UK 12" vinyl

1. "Hollywood Swinging" (feat. Jamiroquai) – 4:28
2. "Hollywood Swinging" (feat. Jamiroquai) (Ralphi Rosario's Old School Vocal) – 7:30
3. "Hollywood Swinging" (feat. Jamiroquai) (Ralphi Rosario's Hollywood Rock Dub) – 9:10
