= Stone Love (Kool & the Gang song) =

Single by Kool & the Gang

from the album Forever
- B-side: "Dance Champion"
- Released: February 1987
- Recorded: 1986
- Genre: R&B
- Length: 4:37
- Label: Mercury/PolyGram
- Songwriters: Robert Earl Bell, Ronald Nathan Bell, George Melvin Brown, Claydes Charles Smith, James "J.T." Taylor, Dennis Thomas and Curtis "Fitz" Williams
- Producer: Khalis Bayyan

Kool & the Gang singles chronology
| "Victory" (1986) | "Stone Love" (1987) | "Holiday" (1987) |

Music video
- "Stone Love" on YouTube

"Stone Love" is a 1987 song written and performed by Kool & the Gang, issued as the second single from the band's 1986 album Forever. The song peaked at number 10 on the Billboard Hot 100 in April 1987, becoming the band's 12th and final Top 10 single, and also their final top 40 to date.

== Charts ==
Weekly chart performance for "Stone Love"
| Chart (1987) | Peak position |
|---|---|
| Australia (Kent Music Report) | 94 |
| Canada Top Singles (RPM) | 69 |
| France (SNEP) | 36 |
| Ireland (IRMA) | 29 |
| Switzerland (Schweizer Hitparade) | 22 |
| UK Singles (Official Charts) | 45 |
| US Billboard Hot 100 | 10 |
| US Adult Contemporary (Billboard) | 11 |
| US Hot Black Singles (Billboard) | 4 |
| US Dance Music/Club Play Singles (Billboard) | 41 |
| US Hot Dance Music/Maxi-Singles Sales (Billboard) | 31 |
| West Germany (GfK) | 18 |

=== Year-end charts ===
1987 year-end chart performance for "Stone Love"
| Chart (1987) | Position |
|---|---|
| European Top 100 Singles (Music & Media) | 71 |
