= Jungle Boogie =

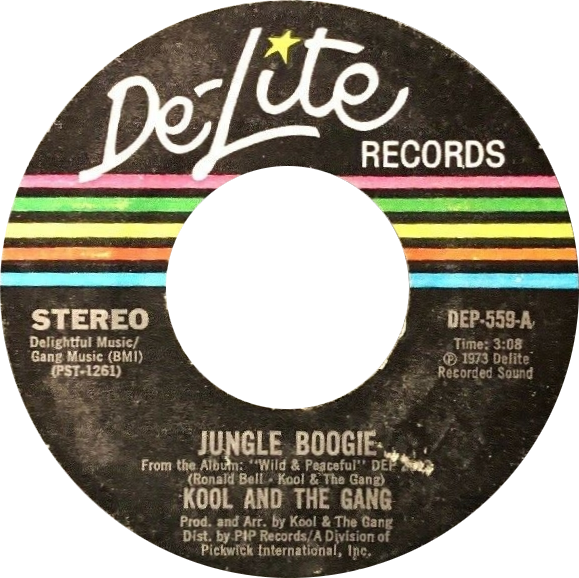
- Side A of the US single

Single by Kool & the Gang

from the album Wild and Peaceful
- B-side: "North, South, East, West"
- Released: November 24, 1973
- Recorded: 1973
- Studio: Mediasound (New York City)
- Genre: Funk
- Length: 3:08
- Label: De-Lite
- Songwriters: Robert Earl Bell, Ronald Nathan Bell, Donald Boyce, George Melvin Brown, Robert Spike Mickens, Claydes Charles Smith, Clifford Adams and Dennis Thomas

Kool & the Gang singles chronology
"Funky Stuff" (1973)	"Jungle Boogie" (1973)	"Hollywood Swinging" (1974)

Audio video
- "Jungle Boogie" on YouTube

"Jungle Boogie" is a funk record by Kool & the Gang from their 1973 album Wild and Peaceful. It reached number four as a single, and became very popular in nightclubs. Billboard ranked it as the number 12 single for 1974, despite as many as 36 No. 1 singles that year.

In 1994, "Jungle Boogie" was repopularized on the soundtrack of the film Pulp Fiction. It was also used in promo packages by wrestling promotion Extreme Championship Wrestling in the mid-1990s.

In 1992, Madonna sampled "Jungle Boogie" in the song "Erotica".

In 1996, the German rap group Rödelheim Hartreim Projekt sampled "Jungle Boogie" in the song "Türkisch" from their album Zurück nach Rödelheim.

== Background ==
The spoken main vocal was performed by the band's roadie Don Boyce. An instrumental version of the tune with an overdubbed flute part and additional percussion instruments, titled "Jungle Jazz", appeared on the album Spirit of the Boogie. There is a Tarzan yell at the track's end and grunting, panting and scatting heard throughout.

== Personnel ==
- Robert "Kool" Bell – bass, vocals
- George "Funky" Brown – drums, percussion, vocals
- Ricky West – electric piano, vocals
- Clay Smith – lead guitar
- Dennis "Dee Tee" Thomas – alto saxophone, flute, congas, vocals
- Ronald Bell – tenor and soprano saxophones, vocals
- Robert "Spike" Mickens – trumpet, vocals
- Don Boyce – spoken word vocals

== Track listing ==
De-Lite Records – DE-559:

No.	Title	Writer(s)	Length
1.	"Jungle Boogie" (from the album Wild and Peaceful)	Kool & the Gang and Ronald Bell	3:08
2.	"North, East, South, West" (from the album Good Times)	Rick West	3:36

== Certifications ==
Region	Certification	Certified units/sales
United States (RIAA)	Platinum	1,000,000^{‡}
^{^} Shipments figures based on certification alone.

== In other media ==
- Samples of this song were used in the American Dad Season 6 episode 11 "A Jones For a Smith"
- The song was used in the teaser trailer for Dunston Checks In.
- This song was played in films such as Pulp Fiction, The Lion King 1½, Undercover Brother, Ready to Rumble and Beerfest.
- This song was featured in the setlist for Rock Band Blitz and subsequently playable as both import and DLC track in Rock Band 3.
- The song is featured on the track list for the 2010 video game Just Dance 2.
- The song plays in the 2020 video game Sackboy: A Big Adventure in the second music-themed level called "Beat the Heat".

== Charts ==
Chart (1973–1974)	Peak position
US Billboard Hot 100	4
US Hot Soul Singles (Billboard)	2
