= Celebration (Kool & the Gang song) =

1980 single by Kool & the Gang

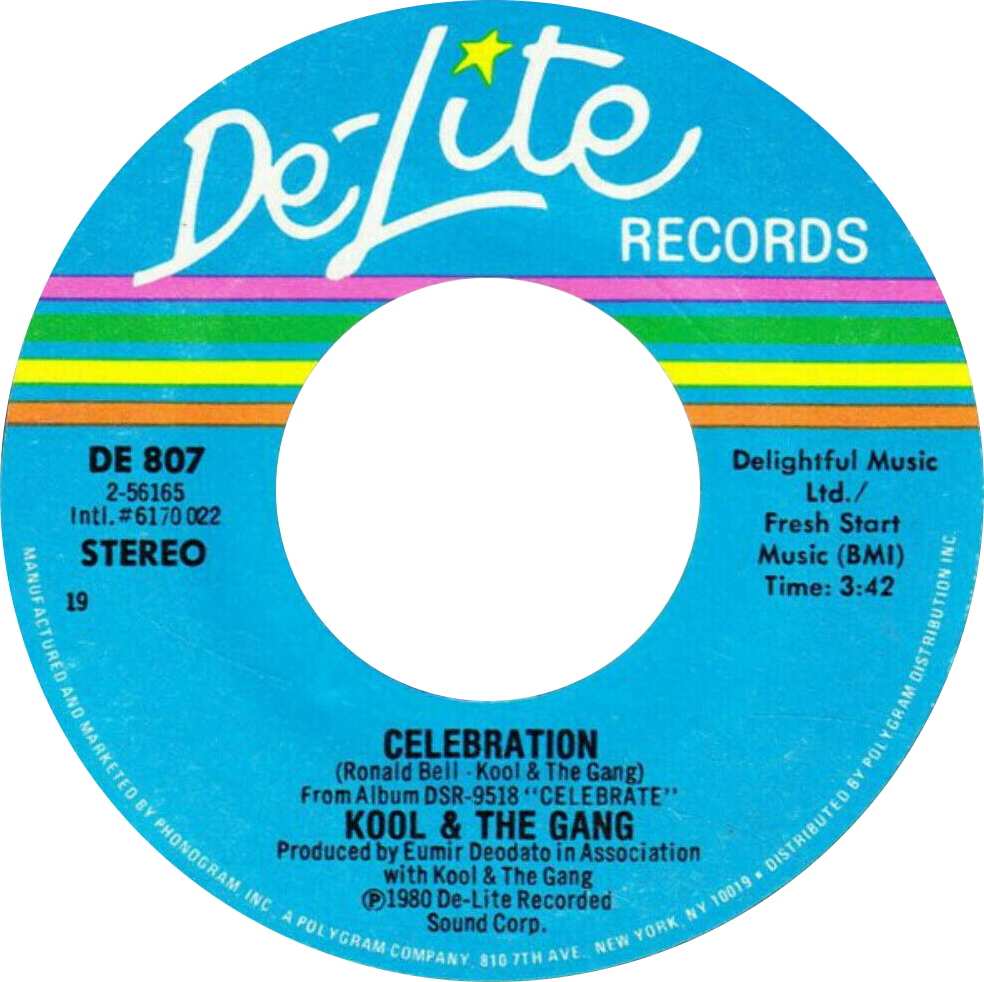
- Side-A label of 1980 US single

Single by Kool & the Gang

from the album Celebrate!
- B-side: "Morning Star"
- Released: October 1980
- Recorded: January–March 1980
- Studio: House of Music, West Orange, New Jersey
- Genre: Post-disco; funk
- Length: 3:42 (7-inch version); 4:17 (video version); 5:00 (12-inch / album version)
- Label: De-Lite
- Songwriters: Ronald Nathan Bell; Claydes Charles Smith; George Melvin Brown; James "J.T." Taylor; Robert Spike Mickens; Earl Eugene Toon Jr.; Dennis Ronald Thomas; Robert Earl Bell; Eumir Deodato
- Producers: Eumir Deodato; Kool & the Gang

Kool & the Gang singles chronology
"Hangin' Out" (1980)	"Celebration" (1980)	"Take It to the Top" (1981)

Music video
- "Celebration" on YouTube

"Celebration" is a song by American band Kool & the Gang. Released in October 1980 by De-Lite Records as the first single from their twelfth album, Celebrate! (1980), it was the band's first and only single to reach number one on the US Billboard Hot 100. In 2016, the song was inducted into the Grammy Hall of Fame.

In 2021, the Library of Congress selected "Celebration" for preservation in the National Recording Registry for being "culturally, historically or aesthetically significant".

== Origins ==
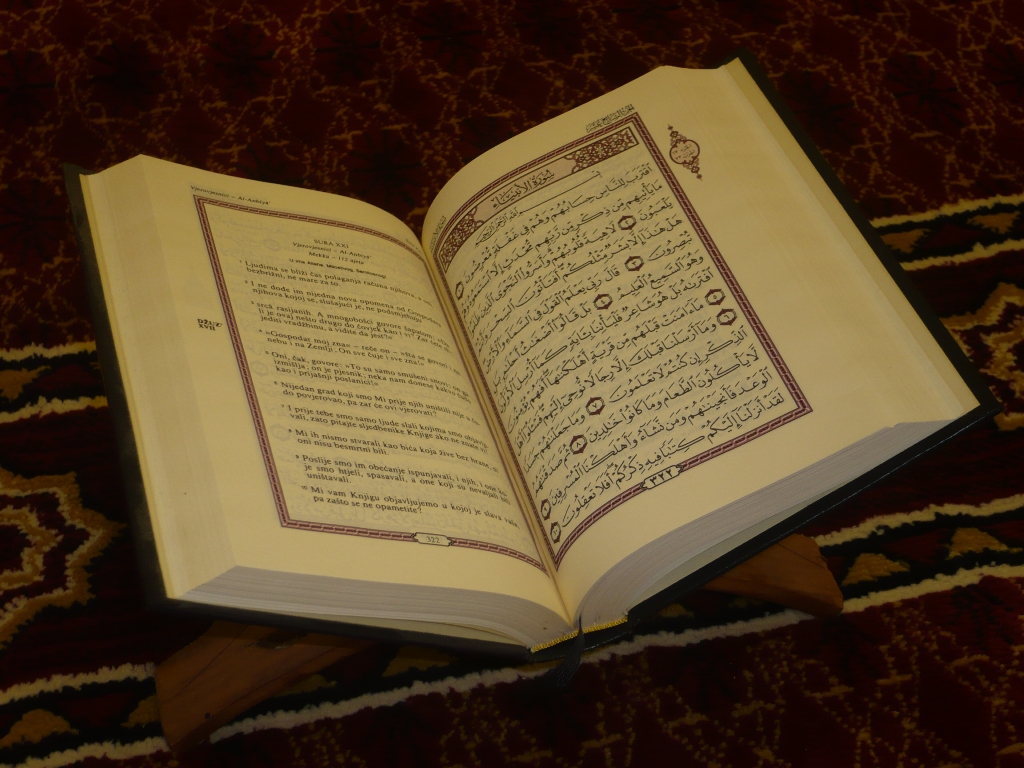
Ronald Bell said "Celebration" was inspired by the Quran (pictured).

Co-founder Ronald Bell, the group's saxophonist and musical arranger, said "Celebration" was inspired by the Quran:

I was reading the passage, where God was creating Adam, and the angels were celebrating and singing praises. That inspired me to write the basic chords, the line, 'Everyone around the world, come on, celebration.'

In The Guardian, Alexis Petridis stated that Bell liked telling people that "Celebration" was inspired by the Quran but that Robert "Kool" Bell had a different explanation of the song's origin. "Kool" recalled Ronald was listening to the band's earlier hit "Ladies' Night" (1979) and noticed the lyric "This is your night tonight, come on, let’s all celebrate." Then, Ronald decided to build a song out of that lyric.

== Composition ==
"Celebration" is in the A♭ Mixolydian mode in common time and was written as a collaboration by the whole band. The song moves at a tempo of 123 beats per minute. The group's vocals span from A♭_{3} to E♭_{5}.

== Critical reception ==
Record World called the song "one big party hook with cool chorus chants & a boss bass", while Stereogum called Taylor's vocals "calmly ecstatic" and described it as a charmingly simple, and thus, fun song due to its lack of subtext.

== Commercial performance ==
"Celebration" reached number one on the Billboard Hot 100 chart on February 7, 1981, and held that position for two weeks before Dolly Parton's "9 to 5" overtook it. It remains the band's only Billboard number one hit.

By late 1980, the song had also reached number one on both the Billboard Dance and R&B charts. The song was featured heavily on the radio throughout the year. It has since been frequently used in weddings and parties, and is a popular anthem for sporting events, including serving as the theme song for the St. Louis Cardinals after winning the 1982 World Series. In 1981, it was commonly played by radio stations in honor of the release of US hostages from captivity in Iran. It was also an international hit, reaching number seven in the United Kingdom on November 29, 1980, spending 13 weeks in the chart.

== Charts ==
=== Weekly charts ===
Chart (1980–1981)	Peak position
Australia (Kent Music Report)	33
Belgium (Ultratop 50 Flanders)	3
Canada Top Singles (RPM)	1
Finland (Suomen virallinen lista)	17
France (IFOP)	24
Ireland (IRMA)	17
Netherlands (Dutch Top 40)	2
Netherlands (Single Top 100)	2
New Zealand (Recorded Music NZ)	1
South Africa (Springbok Radio)	2
Switzerland (Schweizer Hitparade)	6
UK Singles (Official Charts)	7
US Billboard Hot 100	1
US Dance Club Songs (Billboard)	1
US Hot Soul Singles (Billboard)	1
US Adult Contemporary (Billboard)	34
US Cash Box Top 100	1
US Record World Singles	1
West Germany (GfK)	17

Chart (1988–1989) (Remix)	Peak position
France (SNEP)	97
UK Singles (Official Charts)	56

Chart (2013)	Peak position
France (SNEP)	129

=== Year-end charts ===
Chart (1981)	Position
Belgium (Ultratop 50 Flanders)	50
Canada Top Singles (RPM)	9
Netherlands (Dutch Top 40)	41
Netherlands (Single Top 100)	47
South Africa (Springbok Radio)	16
US Billboard Hot 100	6
US Cash Box Top 100	10

== Certifications ==
Region	Certification	Certified units/sales
Canada (Music Canada)	Platinum	150,000^{^}
Denmark (IFPI Danmark)	Gold	45,000^{‡}
New Zealand (RMNZ)	Platinum	30,000^{‡}
Spain (Promusicae)	Gold	30,000^{‡}
United Kingdom (BPI)	Platinum	600,000^{‡}
United States (RIAA)	3× Platinum	3,000,000^{‡}
^{^} Shipments figures based on certification alone.^{‡} Sales+streaming figures based on certification alone.

== Dragon version ==
"Celebration"

Single by Dragon

from the album Bondi Road
- B-side: "Blue Blue Is the Radio"
- Released: November 1987
- Length: 3:56
- Label: RCA
- Songwriters: Ronald Nathan Bell; Claydes Charles Smith; George Melvin Brown; James "J.T." Taylor; Robert Spike Mickens; Earl Eugene Toon Jr.; Dennis Ronald Thomas; Robert Earl Bell; Eumir Deodato
- Producer: David Hirschfelder

Dragon singles chronology
"Nothing to Lose" (1987)	"Celebration" (1987)	"River" (1988)

Music video
- "Celebration" on YouTube

"Celebration" was covered in 1987 and released as a single by New Zealand-Australian band Dragon. It was released in November that year by RCA Records as the lead single from the band's ninth studio album, Bondi Road (1989). The song peaked at number 11 on the Australian Kent Music Report.

=== Charts ===
Chart (1987)	Peak position
Australia (Kent Music Report)	11

== Kylie Minogue version ==
"Celebration"

Single by Kylie Minogue

from the album Greatest Hits
- B-side: "Let's Get to It"; "Too Much of a Good Thing"
- Released: November 16, 1992
- Studio: PWL (London, England)
- Length: 4:06
- Label: Mushroom; PWL International
- Songwriters: Donna Johnson; Claydes Charles Smith; Earl Eugene Toon Jr.; James "J.T." Taylor; Ronald Nathan Bell; George Melvin Brown; Dennis Ronald Thomas; Eumir Deodato; Robert Spike Mickens; Robert Earl Bell
- Producers: Phil Harding; Ian Curnow

Kylie Minogue singles chronology
"What Kind of Fool (Heard All That Before)" (1992)	"Celebration" (1992)	"Confide in Me" (1994)

Music video
- "Celebration" on YouTube

"Celebration" was covered by Australian singer and songwriter Kylie Minogue, who originally recorded it for her fourth studio album, Let's Get to It (1991), but it was not included on the album's release. It later appeared on her 1992 Greatest Hits album and was released as its second single on 16 November 1992 by Mushroom and PWL International. It was produced by Phil Harding and Ian Curnow, and peaked at number 20 on the UK Singles Chart and at number 21 in Australia. "Celebration" has been cited many times as one of Minogue's favorite songs, and it was included on her greatest hits albums Ultimate Kylie, The Best of Kylie Minogue, and Step Back in Time: The Definitive Collection. The techno-rave mix of the track is featured on the Kylie's Non-Stop History 50+1 album. It was also Minogue's last single with PWL International and Stock Aitken Waterman.

=== Track listings ===
- 7-inch single
1. "Celebration"
2. "Let's Get to It" – 3:50
- 12-inch single
1. "Celebration" (Have a Party Mix)
2. "Let's Get to It" (12-inch mix) – 4:52
- CD single
1. "Celebration"
2. "Celebration" (Have a Party Mix)
3. "Let's Get to It" (12-inch mix) – 4:52
- Australian CD single
1. "Celebration"
2. "Celebration" (Have a Party mix)
3. "Too Much of a Good Thing"
- Japanese CD maxi single
1. "Celebration"
2. "Celebration" (Have a Party mix)
3. "Celebration" (Techno RAVE remix)
4. "Let's Get to It" (7-inch mix)
5. "Let's Get to It" (12-inch mix)

=== Charts ===
Chart (1992–1993)	Peak position
Australia (ARIA)	21
Belgium (Ultratop 50 Flanders)	26
Europe (Eurochart Hot 100)	53
Ireland (IRMA)	11
UK Singles (Official Charts)	20
UK Airplay (Music Week)	24
UK Dance (Music Week)	25

=== Release history ===
Region	Date	Format(s)	Label(s)	Ref.
United Kingdom	November 16, 1992	7-inch vinyl; 12-inch vinyl; CD; cassette	PWL International	
Australia	November 30, 1992	CD; cassette	Mushroom	
Australia	January 18, 1993	12-inch vinyl	Mushroom	
Japan	January 21, 1993	CD	PWL	

== See also ==
- List of Billboard Hot 100 number-one singles of 1981
- List of Cash Box Top 100 number-one singles of 1981
- List of number-one dance singles of 1980 (U.S.)
- List of number-one singles of 1981 (Canada)
- List of number-one singles from the 1980s (New Zealand)
- List of number-one R&B singles of 1980 (U.S.)
- List of post-disco artists and songs
