= Ladies' Night (song) =

1979 single by Kool & the Gang

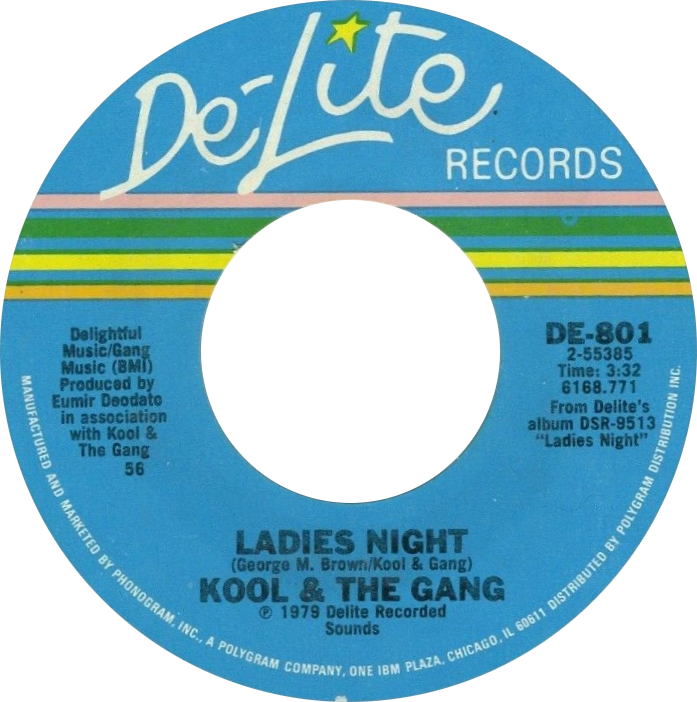
- Side-A label of US 7-inch single

Single by Kool & the Gang

from the album Ladies' Night
- B-side: "If You Feel Like Dancin'"; "Too Hot"
- Released: August 21, 1979
- Genre: Disco
- Length: 6:25 (LP version); 3:32 (single version)
- Label: De-Lite
- Songwriters: Ronald Bell; Claydes Charles Smith; George Brown; James "J.T." Taylor; Robert Bell; Earl Toon, Jr.; Dennis Thomas; Meekaaeel Muhammad
- Producer: Eumir Deodato

Kool & the Gang singles chronology
"Slick Superchick" (1978)	"Ladies' Night" (1979)	"Too Hot" (1979)

Audio video
- "Ladies' Night" (album version) on YouTube

"Ladies' Night" is a song by American band Kool & the Gang, released as the first single from their eleventh album of the same name (1979). It is a play on the popular use of "Ladies Nights" at bars and clubs that were meant to draw in more female patrons in order to draw in even more male clientele.

The single was a big success and became a radio staple. It was a chart success, reaching number four on the US Cash Box Top 100 and number eight on the US Billboard Hot 100 in early 1980. It topped the US R&B chart, where it stayed for three weeks. The single had passed a million in American sales by December and was certified gold by the Recording Industry Association of America (RIAA). This was also their first hit in the United Kingdom, peaking at number nine on the UK Singles Chart in 1979.

Record World called it a "startling shot of funky motion music."

== Track listing ==
Ladies' Night/Too Hot
No.	Title	Writer(s)	Producer(s)	Length
1.	"Ladies' Night"	George M. Brown; Kool and the Gang	Eumir Deodato; Kool and the Gang^{[a]}	3:32
2.	"Too Hot"	Brown; Kool and the Gang	Deodato; Kool and the Gang^{[a]}	4:10

Ladies' Night/If You Feel Like Dancin'
No.	Title	Writer(s)	Producer(s)	Length
1.	"Ladies' Night"	Brown; Kool and the Gang	Deodato; Kool and the Gang^{[a]}	3:32
2.	"If You Feel Like Dancin'"	Ronald Bell; Kool and the Gang	Deodato; Kool and the Gang^{[a]}	5:05

Notes

- ^{^[a]} denotes associate producer

== Charts ==
=== Weekly charts ===
Chart (1979–1980)	Peak position
Austria (Ö3 Austria Top 40)	18
Finland (Suomen virallinen lista)	5
Netherlands (Dutch Top 40)	14
Netherlands (Single Top 100)	12
Norway (VG-lista)	10
Switzerland (Schweizer Hitparade)	7
UK Singles (Official Charts)	9
US Billboard Hot 100	8
West Germany (GfK)	18

=== Year-end charts ===
Chart (1980)	Rank
US Billboard Hot 100	35

== Certifications ==
Region	Certification	Certified units/sales
Canada (Music Canada)	Gold	75,000^{^}
United States (RIAA)	Gold	1,000,000^{^}
^{^} Shipments figures based on certification alone.

== Atomic Kitten version ==
"Ladies Night"

Single by Atomic Kitten featuring Kool & the Gang

from the album Ladies Night and The Hits: Reloaded
- B-side: "Somebody"
- Released: December 15, 2003
- Length: 3:06
- Label: Innocent; Virgin
- Songwriters: Ronald Bell; Kool & the Gang
- Producers: Khalis Bayyan; Leigh Guest; Andy Whitmore; Ash Howes; Martin Harrington

Atomic Kitten singles chronology
"If You Come to Me" (2003)	"Ladies Night" (2003)	"Someone like Me" / "Right Now 2004" (2004)

Audio video
- "Ladies Night" on YouTube

In 2003, Kool & the Gang asked English girl group Atomic Kitten to re-record "Ladies Night" for their The Hits: Reloaded tribute album. The band subsequently asked them if they could include it on their then-untitled third album which they eventually named after the song in honour of the collaboration following Kool's approval. The re-recording was produced by Khalis Bayyana and Leigh Guest; Andy Whitmore is credited as a co-producer, while Ash Howes and Martin Harrington served as additional producers. "Ladies Night" was released as the lead single from The Hits: Reloaded and served as the second single from Atomic Kitten's Ladies Night album. The song peaked at number three in Spain, and reached number eight on the UK Singles Chart, outperforming the original version of the track.

=== Chart performance ===
The song debuted at its peak at number eight on the UK Singles Chart, becoming Atomic Kitten's first single to not reach the top 5 in over two years. It stayed in the top 40 for eight weeks, three of which were in the top 10. In 2021, the Official Charts Company ranked the song as the band's seventh-best-selling single in the United Kingdom – ahead of previous single "If You Come to Me," making it the biggest-selling single from Ladies Night.

In Spain, "Ladies Night" was Atomic Kitten's only top-10 hit, peaking at number three; it lasted three weeks in the top ten of the Spanish Singles Chart. The song reached the top 20 in Flanders, Denmark, Ireland, and the Netherlands and became a top-40 hit in German-speaking Europe, peaking at number 33 in Germany, number 32 in Austria, and number 38 in Switzerland. In Oceania, the song did not do as well as their previous singles. "Ladies Night" was not released in New Zealand, where their previous single "If You Come to Me" had reached the top 10, and it managed to peak at only number 39 in Australia, becoming their last single to reach the top 50 there.

=== Music video ===
A music video for "Ladies Night" was directed by Cameron Casey. The video begins with many people anxiously crowded around the entrance of a club, trying to get in. Suddenly a pink plasma waves sweeps through the middle of the crowd, from the door, pushing them off to either side. The group head into the Kitten Club, and the crowd follows them in, until only the bouncer is left standing outside. In the well-lit club, the group groove about and sing, a great deal of which is on a pure white discothèque dance floor. They primarily dance in a row, with two rows of men behind them, though occasionally they are straddling the fellows, or performing other dance moves with them.

Drag queens are spotted in the video, and appear repeatedly, including in the women's washroom, near the video's conclusion. A bartender, bearing resemblance to Boy George, appears throughout the video. Jenny Frost starts to flirt with him, as if going in for a kiss; in actuality, she is stealing his drink from behind him. While a man hits on Liz McClarnon, he is in turn hit on by another man. The group repeatedly flip their hands in the air, creating pink plasma as appeared earlier in the video. This transports them to the opposite side of the club, where they appear on rollerskates, in different outfits. They use their magic again, instantly stripping three men down to pink lycra underwear. The men, in their skivvies, visit the girls at their booth. Natasha Hamilton is so amused at the provided crotch view that she brings out American money which she waves around; money is never actually transferred. At the very start of the video, when Frost blows a kiss, lip marks appear on the screen as a graphic.

=== Track listings ===
UK CD1
No.	Title	Writer(s)	Producer(s)	Length
1.	"Ladies Night" (radio mix)	Ronald Bell; Kool & the Gang	Khalis Bayyan; Leigh Guest; Andy Whitmore^{[a]}; Ash Howes^{[b]}; Martin Harrington^{[b]}	3:06
2.	"The Tide Is High (Get the Feeling)" (radio mix)	John Holt; Howard Barrett; Tyrone Evans; Bill Padley; Jem Godfrey	Padley; Godfrey; Carrie Grant^{[c]}	3:26

UK CD2
No.	Title	Writer(s)	Producer(s)	Length
1.	"Ladies Night" (radio mix)	Bell; Kool & the Gang	Bayyan; Guest; Whitmore^{[a]}; Howes^{[b]}; Harrington^{[b]}	3:06
2.	"Ladies Night" (Kurtis Mantronik 7-inch)	Bell; Kool & the Gang	Bayyan; Guest; Whitmore^{[a]}; Howes^{[b]}; Harrington^{[b]}; Kurtis Mantronik^{[b]}	3:22
3.	"Somebody"	Natasha Hamilton; Gary Barlow; Eliot Kennedy; Tim Woodcock	The True North Music Company	3:35
4.	"Ladies Night" (video, lyrics, and photo gallery)			3:14

UK 12-inch picture disc
No.	Title	Writer(s)	Producer(s)	Length
1.	"Ladies Night" (Kurtis Mantronik 12-inch)	Bell; Kool & the Gang	Bayyan; Guest; Whitmore^{[a]}; Howes^{[b]}; Harrington^{[b]}; Kurtis Mantronik^{[b]}
2.	"Ladies Night" (radio mix edit)	Bell; Kool & the Gang	Bayyan; Guest; Whitmore^{[a]}; Howes^{[b]}; Harrington^{[b]}
3.	"Be with You" (Todd Terry 12-inch)	Greg Wilson; Tracey Carmen; Martin Foster; Jeff Lynne	Howes; Harrington; Todd Terry^{[b]}
4.	"Be with You" (Todd edit)	Wilson; Carmen; Foster; Lynne	Howes; Harrington; Terry^{[b]}

Australian CD single
No.	Title	Writer(s)	Producer(s)	Length
1.	"Ladies Night" (radio mix)	Bell; Kool & the Gang	Bayyan; Guest; Whitmore^{[a]}; Howes^{[b]}; Harrington^{[b]}	3:06
2.	"Ladies Night" (Kurtis Mantronik 7-inch)	Bell; Kool & the Gang	Bayyan; Guest; Whitmore^{[a]}; Howes^{[b]}; Harrington^{[b]}; Mantronik^{[b]}	3:22
3.	"Be with You" (Todd Terry remix)	Wilson; Carmen; Foster; Lynne	Howes; Harrington; Terry^{[b]}	6:06
4.	"Somebody"	Hamilton; Barlow; Kennedy; Woodcock	The True North Music Company	3:35

Notes

- ^{^[a]} denotes co-producer
- ^{^[b]} denotes additional producer
- ^{^[c]} denotes vocal producer

=== Credits and personnel ===
Credits adapted from the liner notes of Ladies Night.

Studio

- Recorded at KFTA Studios, New Jersey; Metropolis Studios, London; Unique Corp Studios, London

Personnel

- Clifford Adams – trumpet, trombone
- Kaylis Bayyan – producer, saxophone, keyboards
- Ronald Bell – bass guitar, writer
- George "Funky" Brown – keyboard
- Reece Gilmore – programming
- Leigh Guest – arranger, producer, programming
- Martin Harrington – additional producer
- Tim Horton – drums
- Ash Howes – additional producer
- James Loughrey – U production engineer
- Sennie "Skip" Martin – trumpet, vocals
- Andrew Smith – additional guitars
- Charles Smith – guitars
- James "J.T." Taylor – vocals
- Dennis "D. T." Thomas – guitars
- Keith Uddin – engineer
- Andy Whitmore – co-producer, programming, additional keyboards

=== Charts ===
==== Weekly charts ====
Chart (2003–2004)	Peak position
Australia (ARIA)	39
Austria (Ö3 Austria Top 40)	32
Belgium (Ultratop 50 Flanders)	18
Belgium (Ultratip Bubbling Under Wallonia)	2
Denmark (Tracklisten)	12
France (SNEP)	54
Germany (GfK)	33
Hungary (Rádiós Top 40)	40
Hungary (Dance Top 40)	6
Ireland (IRMA)	14
Italy (FIMI)	30
Netherlands (Dutch Top 40)	15
Netherlands (Single Top 100)	16
Romania (Romanian Top 100)	97
Scotland Singles (Official Charts)	9
Spain (Promusicae)	3
Switzerland (Schweizer Hitparade)	38
UK Singles (Official Charts)	8
UK Airplay (Music Week)	11
UK Dance (Official Charts)	6

==== Year-end charts ====
Chart (2003)	Position
UK Singles (OCC)	157

Chart (2004)	Position
UK Singles (OCC)	130

=== Release history ===
Region	Date	Format(s)	Label(s)	Ref.
United Kingdom	December 15, 2003	12-inch vinyl; CD	Innocent; Virgin	
Australia	January 19, 2004	CD	Innocent; Virgin	

== Other covers ==
- "Ladies Night" was remade with Spanner Banner and Sean Paul in 2004. This song was a collaboration with Kool & the Gang and reached 58 in the Swedish chart
- One Way, also known as Al Hudson and (soul) partners, did as similar groove on the 1979 hit "You Can Do It"
- Leon Haywood's 1980 song "Don't Push It Don't Force It" has a similar groove.
- San Francisco indie rock band Two Seconds performs the song at their live shows.
- Rapper Lil' Kim used a sample of this song for the remix of her song "Not Tonight", also called "Not Tonight (Ladies' Night Remix)", which features Angie Martinez, Da Brat, Lisa "Left Eye" Lopes, and Missy Elliott.
- Samantha Mumba sings a portion of the song in "Baby, Come Over (This Is Our Night)".
- C+C Music Factory sampled the end of the song in the song "I Found Love" from the album Anything Goes!.
- Preston Reed did a blues rock instrumental cover
- South Korean-Chinese Girl Group Miss A sampled a portion of the song in "Come On Over" on Hush.
- The song is heard and "rabbidizied" by the rabbids for Rayman Raving Rabbids TV Party.
- On the game show Deal or No Deal, episode "Ladies Night & Hot Dog on a Stick", the song is heard when the firefighters are holding the cases.
