= Kool & the Gang =

American R&B, soul and funk band

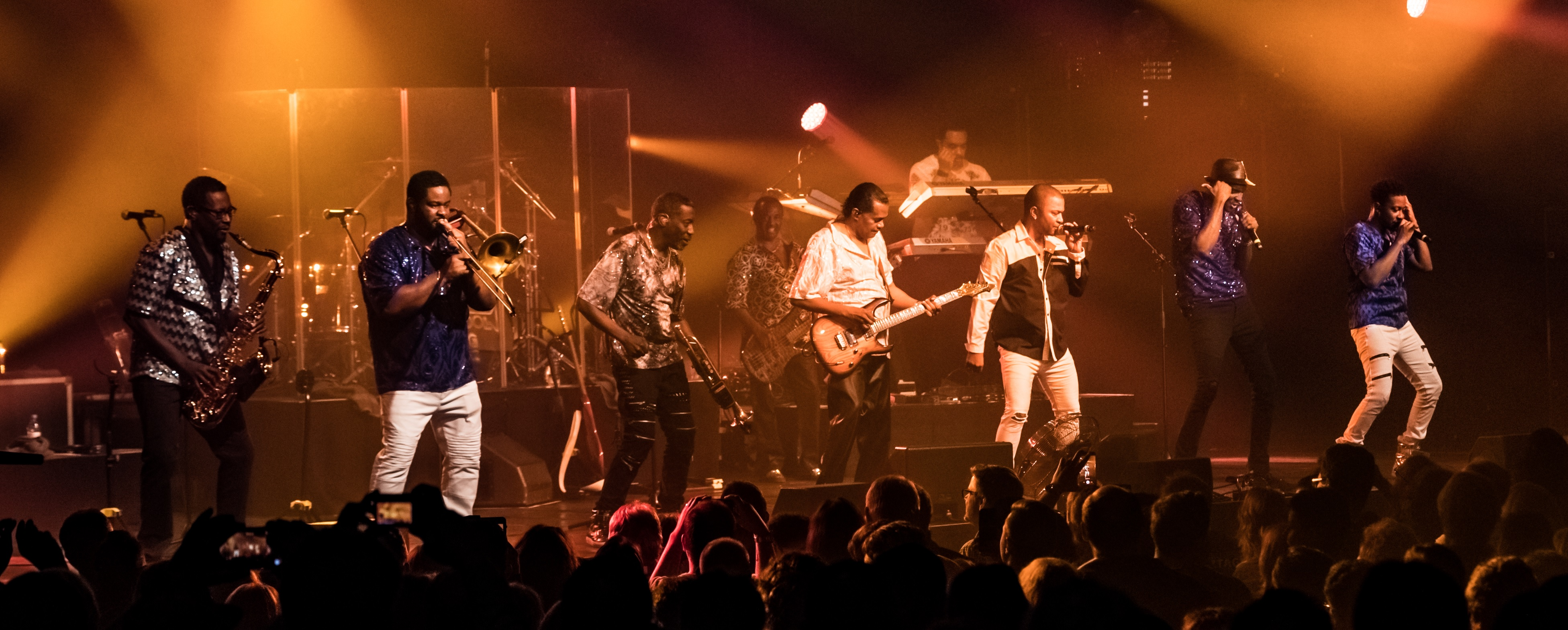
- Kool & the Gang performing in 2017.

Background information
- Also known as: The Jazziacs; The Soul Town Band; The New Dimensions; Kool & the Flames
- Origin: Jersey City, New Jersey, U.S.
- Genres: R&B; soul; funk; disco
- Works: Kool & the Gang discography
- Years active: 1964–present
- Labels: De-Lite; Mercury; ATO; Curb; Omnivore; Universal Music Group
- Members: Robert "Kool" Bell; Amir Bayyan; Curtis "Fitz" Williams; Shawn McQuillier; Timothy Horton; Curtis Pulliam; Jermaine Bryson; Walt Anderson; Rick Marcel; Louis Taylor; Aaron Haggerty
- Past members: Ronald "Khalis Bayyan" Bell; Dennis "DeeTee" Thomas; George "Funky" Brown; Claydes "Charles" Smith; Spike Mickens; Woody Sparrow; Larry Gittens; James "JT" Taylor; Sir Earl Toon; Michael Ray (trumpeter); Louis Van Taylor; Sennie "Skip" Martin; Ricky Westfield
- Website: koolandthegang.com

Kool & the Gang is an American R&B, soul and funk band formed in Jersey City, New Jersey, in 1964. Its founding members include brothers Robert "Kool" Bell and Ronald Bell (also known as "Khalis Bayyan"), Dennis "Dee Tee" Thomas, Robert "Spike" Mickens, Charles Smith, George "Funky" Brown, Woodrow "Woody" Sparrow and Ricky Westfield. They have undergone numerous changes in personnel and have explored many musical styles throughout their history, including jazz, rhythm and blues, soul, funk, disco, rock and pop music. The group changed their name several times. Settling on Kool & the Gang, the group signed to De-Lite Records and released their debut album Kool and the Gang in 1969.

The band's first mainstream success came with the release of their fourth album Wild and Peaceful (1973); it contained the US top-ten singles "Jungle Boogie" and "Hollywood Swinging". The band entered a period of decline before they reached a second commercial peak between 1979 and 1986 following their partnership with Brazilian musician and producer Eumir Deodato and the addition of singer James "J.T." Taylor to the line-up. Their most successful albums of the time include Ladies' Night (1979), Celebrate! (1980) and Emergency (1984), the latter being their highest-selling album, with two million copies sold in the US. Their hit singles during the period include "Ladies' Night" (1979), the US No. 1 "Celebration" (1980), "Get Down on It" (1981), "Joanna" (1983), "Misled" (1984) and "Cherish" (1985). The group has continued to perform worldwide, including as a supporting act for Van Halen in 2012 and their fiftieth-anniversary tour in 2014.

Kool & the Gang have won numerous awards, including two Grammy Awards, seven American Music Awards and, in 2006, a Music Business Association Chairman's Award for artistic achievement. The group has been inducted into the New Jersey Hall of Fame and been given a MOBO Award for Outstanding Achievement, the Soul Train Legend Award, the Marian Anderson Award and a star on the Hollywood Walk of Fame. In 2007, the group was inducted into the Vocal Group Hall of Fame. Throughout 2018, the Bells, Brown and Taylor were also inducted into the Songwriters Hall of Fame and the group were inducted into the Rock and Roll Hall of Fame in 2024. Their discography includes 23 studio albums and nearly 70 singles. They have sold 7.5 million and 4.5 million Recording Industry Association of America-certified albums and singles, respectively, in the United States. Worldwide, they have sold over 70 million albums.

== History ==
=== 1964–1972: Formation and signing with De-Lite ===
The band formed in Jersey City, New Jersey, in 1964 when seven school friends decided to perform together as an instrumental jazz and soul group named the Jazziacs. Among them were Robert "Kool" Bell on bass, his brother Ronald Bell on keyboards, both from Youngstown, Ohio originally, Robert "Spike" Mickens on trumpet, Dennis "Dee Tee" Thomas on saxophone, Ricky West on keyboards, George Brown on drums, and Charles Smith on guitar. Except Smith, all of them attended Lincoln High School in Jersey City. Robert Bell had given himself the nickname "Kool" as a way of adapting to the street gangs in his neighborhood after moving from Ohio. The Bells' father Bobby and uncle Tommy were boxers. They moved to New York to train and lived in the same apartment building as Thelonious Monk, who became Robert's godfather. Miles Davis would drop by because he wanted to be a boxer.

Their first gigs took place as the opening act to a weekly jazz night held in a local theatre every Sunday. They also played occasionally with McCoy Tyner, Pharoah Sanders, and Leon Thomas during their early years as a group. They then had several name changes, including "the Soul Town Band" and "the New Dimensions". They played Motown covers as the backing musicians for Soul Town, a small Jersey City-based organization similar to Motown. In 1967, they became regular performers at the Blue Note Lounge in Jersey, where one of the emcees advertised them with a new name, Kool & the Flames. However, since their manager, Gene Redd, advised against taking this name to avoid confusion with James Brown's band, the Famous Flames, the band settled on Kool & the Gang instead.

After selecting the new band name and line-up, Kool & the Gang signed a recording deal with Redd's new independent label, De-Lite Records. Redd wrote: "I discovered these eight super talented incomparable young musicians, [...and...] I immediately realized that their potential would earn them success unknown by most musicians". The group entered the studio and recorded their debut album, the all-instrumental Kool and the Gang (1969), with Redd as a producer, arranger, conductor, and partial songwriter. It would be their only album with guitarist Woody Sparrow. The album peaked at No. 46 on the Billboard R&B chart. Around this time, the group began to develop their stage performance after they witnessed a set by Willie (Feaster) and the Mighty Magnificents which, according to Robert Bell, "Blew us away[...] We thought, 'Wow, if we want to be in show business, we have to change our act. We can't just stand up there and play'." Also at this time, the group were asked to deliver songs with vocals. Despite Bell recalling the group sounding "real ragged" with lyrics at first, "Bit by bit we gained in confidence... we kinda learnt how to sing as we went along."

The group followed their debut with two live albums: Live at the Sex Machine, recorded the year before, and Live at PJ's, both released in 1971. These were their final albums before their amicable split with Redd. Their next album, Music Is the Message, was the first time the group self-produced one of their records. It was released in July 1972, and peaked at No. 25 on the R&B chart. It was followed with Good Times in November, which featured the band backed by a string section. The elements of jazz, rock, and instrumental styles on the record made it difficult for reviewers to categorize the band by genre. Since the album failed to generate the radio exposure the group had hoped for, they began to explore how to build a following without relying on airplay.

=== 1973–1978: First commercial success and low period ===
By the spring of 1973, Kool & the Gang was influenced by the growing disco music scene, driving it to create sound Robert Bell described as "a much harder, funkier, tighter" unit than before. He said band members mostly learned of disco culture from others, and didn't frequent discotheques.

With the change in musical direction came the band's first major commercial success. Their fourth studio album, Wild and Peaceful, went to No. 33 on the album chart. The album was certified "gold" by RIAA for selling 500,000 copies. It also spawned the Top-40 single "Funky Stuff". The album's next two singles, "Jungle Boogie" and "Hollywood Swinging", fared even better by entering the US top 10. This also marked the group's breakthrough to a white audience. The latter two songs sold over one million copies and were certified gold by the Recording Industry Association of America (RIAA).

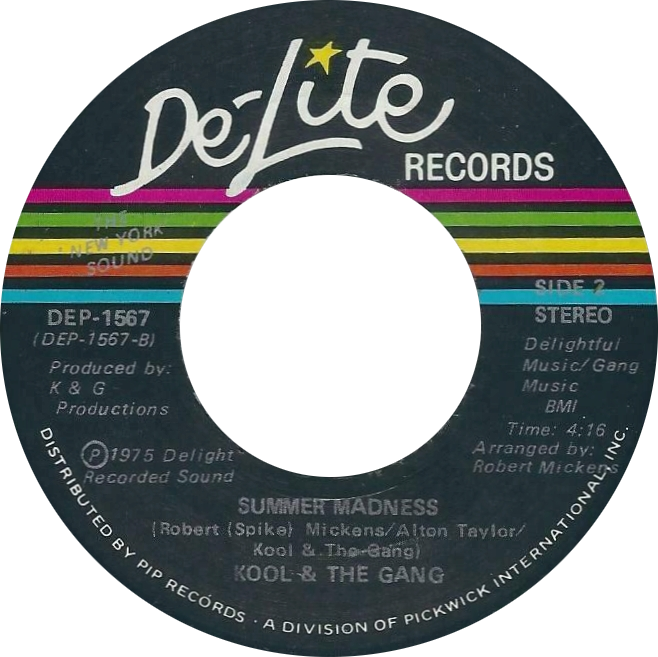
The group's 1974 single "Summer Madness" has appeared in numerous media, including in the 1976 drama film Rocky. It was also in a famous 2006 Nike advertisement featuring LeBron James

Their success continued with Light of Worlds (1974), which contained the hit instrumental "Summer Madness". In October 1974, the group landed a spot on the national television music show Soul Train. In 1975 Kool & the Gang added Larry Gittens from the Stylistics, and released Spirit of the Boogie which contained the top 40 single "Spirit of the Boogie". That was followed by the part-studio part-live release Love & Understanding, in 1976.

By mid-1976, however, Kool & the Gang entered a period of commercial decline. Rolling Stone writer Geoff Himes wrote the fans "frowned on their loose and greasy approach to dance music." Their three albums released during this time, Open Sesame (1976), The Force (1977), and Everybody's Dancin' (1978) failed to generate the same commercial or critical acclaim as their previous records. Bell later said the albums "bent our style a bit, and we didn't feel at home with it". The Force and Everybody's Dancin' displayed the group's attempt to adopt disco elements with female vocalists and a string section, but Robert Bell later said the group got "Too fancy and over-creative[...] We got away from the basic Kool & the Gang sound[...] and the public didn't like it". The change in style affected their ability to secure as many dates as before, working "just off and on" during this time. One review for Everybody's Dancin' bore the headline, "Kool and the Gang have gone bland." Writer Mike Duffy opined, "They've joined the disco lemmings [...] The edge has gone. Say so long to the raw and raunchy."

During their low period, the group gained some mainstream attention with their contribution of "Open Sesame" to the soundtrack of Saturday Night Fever (1977). "Summer Madness" was also used in Rocky (1976), but not released on its soundtrack album.

=== 1979–1988: J.T. Taylor, Deodato partnership, and commercial peak ===
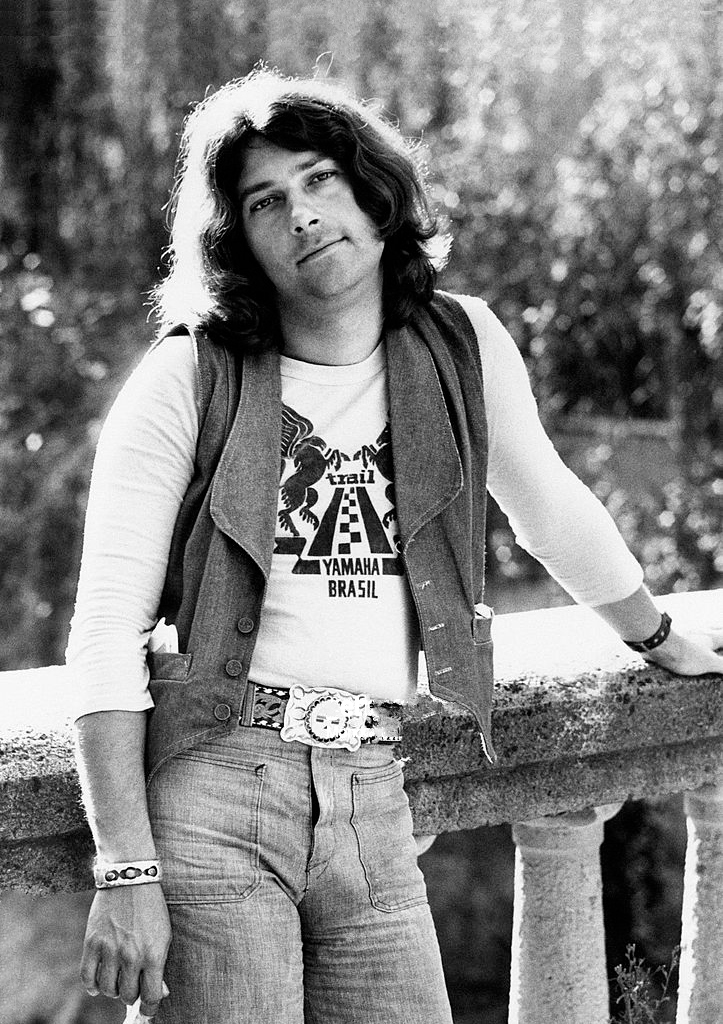
Kool & the Gang entered a four-album partnership with Brazilian producer Eumir Deodato

By 1979, Kool & the Gang changed musical direction in two distinct ways. After several years of consideration, and at the suggestion of promoter turned SOLAR Records founder Dick Griffey, they brought in a dedicated lead vocalist to become a focal point of their music. James "J.T." Taylor from South Carolina was added; Taylor noted that vocals added more warmth to the songs, especially to ballads, which the group had previously avoided as no vocalist in the group could sing them properly. He recalled some resistance to his arrival from some group members and the female singers they had used on The Force and Everybody's Dancin'. The change in style developed further when the group entered a four-album association with Brazilian musician, songwriter, and arranger Eumir Deodato as their producer, who helped them move towards mainstream pop and dance-oriented music with greater emphasis on catchy hooks and chorus lines. The group's first choice, Stevie Wonder, was too busy to work with them. Earl Toon Jr. was added to the group.

Kool & the Gang's first album with Deodato, Ladies' Night, was released in September 1979 and became their most successful album since their formation. This was helped by the hit singles "Too Hot" and "Ladies' Night", which went to No. 5 and No. 8 on the Billboard Hot 100 chart, respectively. In January 1980, Ladies' Night was certified platinum by the RIAA for selling one million copies in the US. Later that year, Celebrate! became a bigger commercial success than Ladies' Night; the lead single "Celebration" remains the band's only single to reach No. 1 on the Billboard Hot 100 singles chart. The song originated from the lyric "Come on, let's all celebrate" from "Ladies' Night", which inspired Robert Bell to write "an international anthem." The group developed the song on a tour bus after attending the American Music Awards. The song was used in national media coverage for the 1980 World Series, the 1981 Super Bowl, the 1981 NBA Finals, and the 1981 return of the Iran hostages.

After the release of Something Special (1981), which continued the level of success of the previous two albums, the band recorded their fourth and final album with Deodato, As One (1982). The latter struggled to reach gold certification in the US, which led to the band's decision to end their time with Deodato as they had enough with the direction they had adopted. They then decided to produce their next album, In the Heart (1983), by themselves with Jim Bonnefond as co-producer. The album contained the US top-five single "Joanna". The song was declared the most-played pop song in 1984 by Broadcast Music International. Bonnefond stayed with the group for Emergency (1984), which remains their highest selling album with over two million copies sold in the US. It spawned four US top 20 singles, including "Emergency", "Cherish", "Fresh", and "Misled". The feat made Kool & the Gang the only group to have four top 20 singles from a single album in 1985.

In June 1984, Kool & the Gang took time off from recording Emergency to perform at Wembley Stadium as part of a sold-out summer concert organised by Elton John. That November, during a visit to Phonogram's offices in London, Bob Geldof arrived to pitch his idea of the multi-artist charity single "Do They Know It's Christmas?" to the label. Kool & the Gang participated in the project. In 1985, Bell said the group retained control of their own business affairs, avoiding to hire management on a full-time basis and preferring to hire consultants and agents for each project or a single term.

The group's seventeenth album, Forever, was released in November 1986. The album included two hit singles on the Billboard Hot 100 chart: "Victory" (US No. 10, R&B No. 2) and "Stone Love" (US No. 10, R&B No. 4). Two further singles, "Holiday" and "Special Way" were also released from the album; the former reached the top ten on the R&B Chart, the latter hit reached No. 6 on the Adult Contemporary chart. By 1986, the group had scored 14 top 40 singles in the US since 1980, more than Michael Jackson. In July 1986, the band recorded a special version of "Fresh" with different vocals that was used in an advertisement for Wendy's.

In 1987, the group completed a 50-city tour of the US. The tour included the group establishing their own public service program, devised by Robert Bell and Taylor, which encouraged school children to pursue education, giving free tickets to those with perfect attendance. The group rehearsed their stage show with a choreographer at Prince's studio at Paisley Park. At the time of the tour's start, the group ceased producing adverts with Schlitz beer because of their new image towards children and that they felt it had run its course. After the tour, Taylor left Kool & the Gang to pursue a solo career. He returned in 1996 for their State of Affairs album.

=== 1988–present: Later career ===
In February 1988, news of Taylor's departure from the group to pursue a solo career was reported in the press. The group had discussed pursuing solo projects during the previous year, with Thomas suggesting the band had considered splitting into twos or threes. Taylor was replaced by three vocalists: Sennie "Skip" Martin, Odeen Mays, and Gary Brown.

In 1989 the group's 18th album Sweat was released. By that time Khalis Bayyan and Robert "Spike" Mickens also had departed the group. The album did not fare well. Unite, the group's nineteenth studio album, was released in 1992. It marked the return of Khalis Bayyan to the group. In 1995, Taylor returned to the group for State of Affairs (1996), hailed as the group's "comeback" album. All of the songs on the album were written by Khalis Bayyan and Taylor. Taylor left the group for the second time in 1999.

On their next studio album Gangland (2001), Kool & the Gang pursued elements of hip-hop. The album was a compilation of rappers backed by Kool and the Gang remaking some of the group's songs. During 2003 the group was given a Mobo Award for Outstanding Achievement. In 2004 they released another album featuring remakes and some new songs. The Hits Reloaded contained collaborations with artists such as Atomic Kitten, Lisa Stansfield and Jamiroquai. The album reached No. 21 on the UK R&B Albums chart. During 2007 the group released another album entitled Still Kool. The album reached No. 31 on the US Billboard Top Soul Albums chart. Still Kool has also been certified Platinum in France by the SNEP.

In 2012, Bell accepted Van Halen singer David Lee Roth's invitation for Kool & the Gang to be the opening act during their A Different Kind of Truth Tour as Roth had noticed a significant portion of their concert audience were women. Roth wanted the group after seeing their set at Glastonbury. In 2013 the group released a Christmas album Kool for the Holidays. That was the group's 24th studio album.

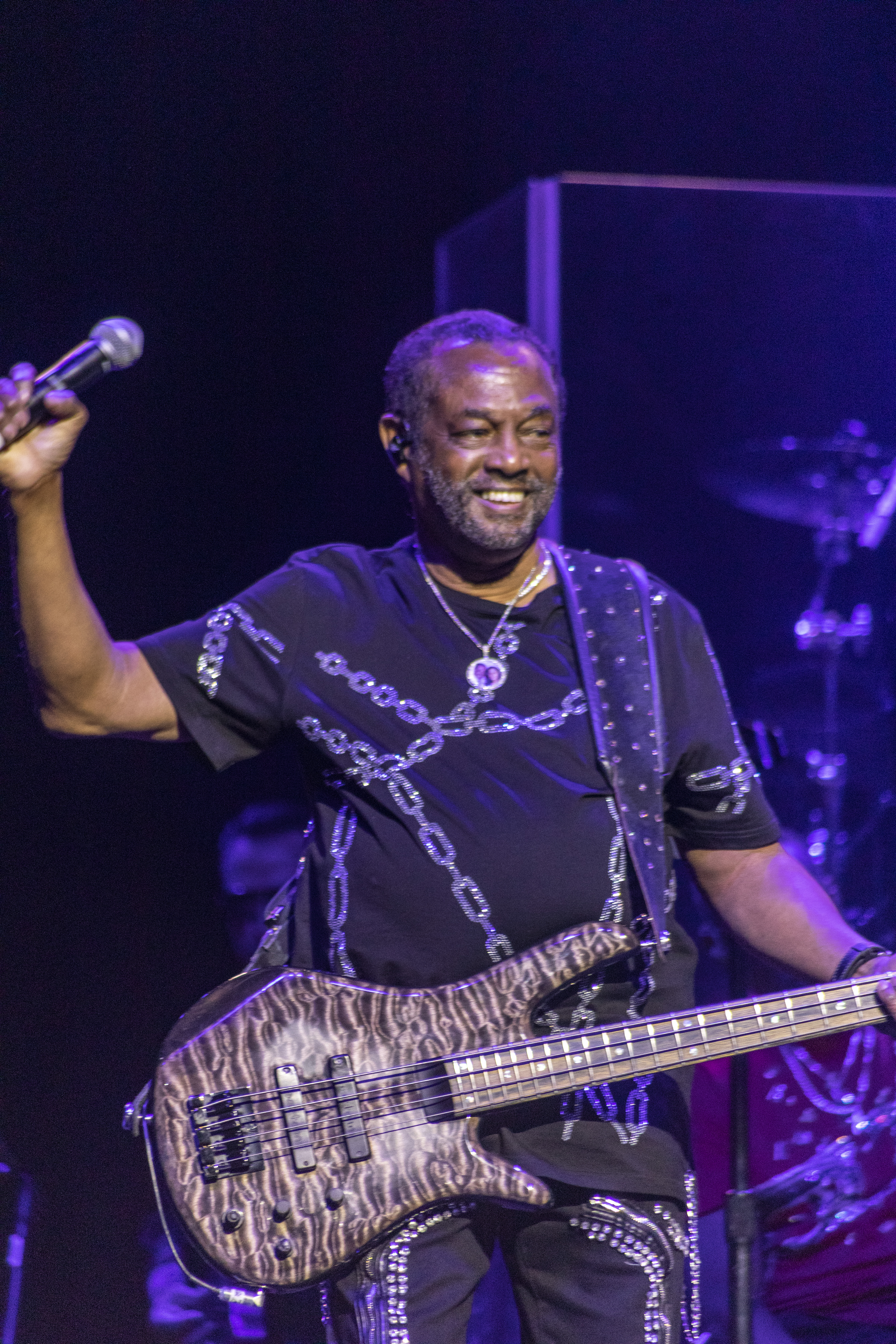
Bell at Ocean Casino in Atlantic City, NJ (2023)

In 2015, 50 years after formation, the group received their star on the Hollywood Walk of Fame. During that year they were also inducted into the New Jersey Hall of Fame.

In 2016, a Jersey City street was renamed the "Kool and the Gang Way". During 2019, Kool and the Gang was also bestowed with the Marian Anderson Award.

In 2021, the group released Perfect Union, their 25th studio album and first album of new material in 14 years. The album was produced by Khalis Bayyan before his 2020 death.

On November 20, 2022, the group performed a special live concert at the naming ceremony for the newly christened Carnival Celebration, notably performing “Celebration” as a nod to the newest addition to the Carnival fleet.

Kool & the Gang were selected for induction into the Rock and Roll Hall of Fame in April 2024. They were officially inducted by rapper Chuck D (of Public Enemy) at the ceremony in October. The band, backed by the Roots, reunited with former singer James "JT" Taylor at the induction ceremony and performed a medley of their hit songs including "Get Down on it", "Jungle Boogie", "Hollywood Swinging", "Ladies' Night", and "Celebration"

Longtime Kool & the Gang stylist and choreographer Michael Sumler, who opened concerts for the group since 1985 and was widely known as "Chicago Mike", died in a car crash in Cobb County, Georgia, on May 24, 2025, at the age of 71.

== Music appearances ==
The group's music has been featured in several movies and video games:

- "Jungle Boogie" was featured on the soundtracks for the movies Pulp Fiction (1994) and Undercover Brother (2002).
- One Life to Live (January 1986 Episode No. 4491)
- "Open Sesame" was featured on the Saturday Night Fever soundtrack (1977)
- "Summer Madness" was played in the movies Rocky (1976) and Baby Boy (2001)

== Personnel ==
Current members

- Robert "Kool" Bell – bass, backing vocals (1964–present)
- Curtis "Fitz" Williams – keyboards, backing vocals (1982–1988, 1995–present); alto saxophone (2021–present)
- Shawn "Shawny Mac" McQuiller – vocals, guitar (1991–present)
- Amir Bayyan (Kevin Bell) – lead guitar, keyboards (1995–1996, 2006–present; touring & session member 1975–1980)
- Timothy Horton – drums, percussion (1998–present)
- Curtis Pulliam – trumpet, backing vocals (2013–2016, 2024–present)
- Jermaine Bryson – trombone, backing vocals (2015–present)
- Walt Anderson – vocals, keyboards (2016–present)
- Rick Marcel – guitar, bass, backing vocals (2017–present)
- Louis "Nicky" Taylor – tenor saxophone, backing vocals (2023–present)

Former members

- George "Funky" Brown – drums (1964–1998), keyboards (1989–1993, 1998–2023), percussion, backing vocals (1964–2023; his death)
- Dennis "Dee Tee" Thomas – alto saxophone, flute, backing vocals (1964–2021; his death)
- Claydes Charles Smith – guitar (1964–2006; his death)
- Ronald Bell – tenor saxophone, keyboards, backing vocals (1964–1989, 1992–2020; his death)
- Ricky Westfield – keyboards, vocals (1964–1976; died 1985)
- Robert "Spike" Mickens – trumpet, backing vocals (1964–1986; died 2010)
- Woodrow "Woody" Sparrow – rhythm and lead guitar (1964–1969; his death)
- Larry Gittens – trumpet, flugelhorn, backing vocals, keyboards (1975–1977, 1986–1988, session/touring 2000–2013)
- Otha Nash – trombone (1975–1977; died 2003)
- Kevin Lassiter – keyboards, vocals (1976–1979)
- Clifford Adams – trombone, backing vocals (1980–1995; session/touring 1977–1980, 1995–2015; his death)
- James "J.T." Taylor – vocals (1979–1988, 1996–1999; one-off guest in 2024)
- Sir Earl Toon – keyboards, vocals (1979–1982)
- Michael Ray – trumpet, backing vocals (1979–1991, 2007–2023)
- Gary Brown – vocals (1988–1990)
- Sennie "Skip" Martin – trumpet, vocals (1988–1995; session/touring 1995–2007)
- Odeen Mays – keyboards, guitar, vocals (1988–1995)
- Gerald Harris – keyboards, guitar (1992–1995)

Former session/touring musicians

- Donald Boyce – vocals (1973–1976)
- Jeannine Otis – backing vocals (1976)
- Royal Bayyan – guitar (1978–1987)
- Mark Blakey – drums (1988–1989)
- Robert "Robbie G" Goble – drums, percussion (1989–1993)
- Bernard Davis - drums (touring 1995)
- Louis Van Taylor – tenor saxophone, backing vocals (2020–2023; touring substitute for Ronald Bell 1996–2017)
- Frank "Rusty" Hamilton – keyboards (1996–2005)
- Rodney "King" Ellis – vocals (2000–2007)
- Jirmad "Soul-O" Gordon – vocals (2007–2010)
- Lavell Evans – vocals, percussion (2009–2023)
- Ravi Best – trumpet, backing vocals (2016–2024)
- Shelley Carrol – tenor saxophone (touring substitute for Ronald Bell 2017–2020)
- Aaron Haggerty – drums, percussion (touring substitute 2017, 2024)

Rick West, the group's original keyboardist, who left in 1976 to form his own band, died in 1985.

Guitarist Charles Smith died after a long illness in 2006 and was replaced by the Bells' youngest brother, Amir Bayyan, former leader of the Kay Gees.

Original trumpet player Robert "Spike" Mickens, who retired in 1986 due to poor health, died at the age of 59 on November 2, 2010, at a nursing home in Far Rockaway, New York.

Trombonist Clifford Alanza Adams Jr. died in January 2015 at the age of 62 after a year-long battle with cancer. Adams, who had been with Kool & the Gang since 1977, had no health insurance to cover medical expenses.

Saxophonist Ronald "Khalis Bayyan" Bell died suddenly in September 2020; the cause of death was not announced.

Alto saxophonist Dennis "D.T." Thomas died in his sleep on August 7, 2021, at the age of 70.

Drummer George “Funky” Brown died from lung cancer on November 16, 2023, at the age of 74.

== Discography ==
Studio albums

- Kool and the Gang (1969)
- Music Is the Message (1972)
- Good Times (1972)
- Wild and Peaceful (1973)
- Light of Worlds (1974)
- Spirit of the Boogie (1975)
- Love & Understanding (1976)
- Open Sesame (1976)
- The Force (1977)
- Everybody's Dancin' (1978)
- Ladies' Night (1979)
- Celebrate! (1980)
- Something Special (1981)
- As One (1982)
- In the Heart (1983)
- Emergency (1984)
- Forever (1986)
- Sweat (1989)
- Unite (1992)
- State of Affairs (1996)
- Gangland (2001)
- The Hits: Reloaded (2004)
- Still Kool (2007)
- Kool for the Holidays (2013)
- Perfect Union (2021)
- People Just Wanna Have Fun (2023)
