= Ronald Bell (musician) =

American musician (1951–2020)

Ronald Nathan Bell (November 1, 1951–September 9, 2020) also known as Khalis Bayyan, was an American composer, singer, songwriter, arranger, producer, saxophonist and co-founding member of Kool & the Gang. The band recorded nine No. 1 R&B singles in the 1970s and 1980s, including its No. 1 pop single "Celebration". The group is honored on the Hollywood Walk of Fame and was inducted into the Songwriters Hall of Fame and Rock and Roll Hall of Fame.

== Early life ==
Bell was born in Youngstown, Ohio, to Aminah Bayyan (1932–2014) and Robert "Bobby" Bell (1929–1985). His father was a professional boxer and Golden Gloves amateur boxing winner. Training in Elwood, New York, Bobby Bell had hung out with jazz players and became friends with Miles Davis and Thelonious Monk, who lived in the same apartment building as he did.

Ronald Bell and his brother, Robert "Kool" Bell, were introduced to jazz at around five or six. The family moved to Jersey City, New Jersey, in 1960. In 1964, the brothers joined neighborhood friends Spike Mickens, Dennis Thomas, Ricky Westfield, George Brown, and Charles Smith to create a distinctive musical blend of jazz, soul, and funk. At first calling themselves "The Jazziacs", the band went through various name changes—the New Dimensions, the Soul Town Band, and Kool & the Flames—before settling on Kool & the Gang in 1968.

== Career ==
Ronald Bell composed, arranged, produced and performed some of the most popular music in Kool and the Gang's body of work. He was a self-taught musician, and his distinctive sound is on the group's horn lines, bass, synthesizer and vocals. He wrote and produced many of the Kool & the Gang's songs, including "Celebration", "Cherish", "Jungle Boogie", "Summer Madness", and "Open Sesame". He said his favorite song was "Celebration", which he wrote after reading a passage in the Quran.

== Personal life and death ==
Bell converted to Islam in 1972, initially joining the Nation of Islam. He was given the name Khalis Bayyan by Imam Warith Deen Mohammed. He was married to Tia Sinclair Bell and had 10 children. His son, Rachid, released his debut album in 1998, and achieved a top 40 hit on the Dance Club Songs chart with his debut single, "Pride".

Bell died at his home in the United States Virgin Islands on September 9, 2020, at age 68. No cause was given but the death was described as sudden.

== Discography ==
=== Studio albums ===
Year	Album
1969	Kool and the Gang
1972	Music Is the Message
1972	Good Times
1973	Wild and Peaceful
1974	Light of Worlds
1975	Spirit of the Boogie
1976	Love & Understanding
1976	Open Sesame
1977	The Force
1978	Everybody's Dancin'
1979	Ladies' Night
1980	Celebrate!
1981	Something Special
1982	As One
1983	In the Heart
1984	Emergency
1986	Forever
1989	Sweat
1992	Unite
1996	State of Affairs
2001	Gangland
2004	The Hits: Reloaded
2007	Still Kool
2013	Kool for the Holidays

=== Live albums ===
Year	Album
1971	Live at the Sex Machine
1971	Live at PJ's
1998	Greatest Hits Live
2002	Too Hot Live
2010	The Very Best-Live In Concert

=== Singles ===
Year	Single
1969	"Kool and the Gang"
1969	"The Gang's Back Again" (A-side)
1969	"Kool's Back Again" (B-side)
1970	"Kool It (Here Comes The Fuzz)"
1970	"Let the Music Take Your Mind"
1970	"Funky Man"
1971	"Who's Gonna Take the Weight (Part One)"
1971	"I Want to Take You Higher"
1971	"N.T. Part I"
1972	"Love the Life You Live, Part I"
1972	"Music Is the Message (Part 1)"
1972	"Funky Granny"
1972	"Good Times"
1973	"Country Junky"
1973	"Funky Stuff"
1973	"Jungle Boogie"
1974	"Hollywood Swinging"
1974	"Higher Plane"
1974	"Rhyme Tyme People"
1975	"Spirit of the Boogie" (A-side)
1975	"Summer Madness" (B-side)
1975	"Caribbean Festival"
1976	"Love and Understanding (Come Together)"
1976	"Universal Sound"
1976	"Open Sesame - Part 1"
1977	"Super Band"
1978	"Slick Superchick"
1978	"A Place in Space"
1978	"I Like Music"
1978	"Everybody's Dancin'"
1979	"Ladies' Night"
1979	"Too Hot"
1980	"Hangin' Out"
1980	"Celebration"
1981	"Take It to the Top"
1981	"Jones vs. Jones"
1981	"Take My Heart (You Can Have It If You Want It)"
1981	"Steppin' Out"
1981	"Get Down on It"
1982	"No Show"
1982	"Big Fun"
1982	"Let's Go Dancin' (Ooh La, La, La)"
1982	"Hi De Hi, Hi De Ho"
1983	"Street Kids"
1983	"Straight Ahead"
1983	"Joanna"
1984	"Tonight"
1984	"(When You Say You Love Somebody) In the Heart"
1984	"Fresh"
1984	"Misled"
1985	"Cherish"
1985	"Emergency"
1986	"Victory"
1987	"Stone Love"
1987	"Holiday"
1987	"Special Way"
1987	"Peace Maker"
1988	"Rags to Riches"
1988	"Strong"
1988	"Celebration" (remix)
1989	"Raindrops"
1989	"Never Give Up"
1991	"Get Down on It" (remix)
1992	"(Jump Up on The) Rhythm and Ride"
1996	"Salute to the Ladies"
2003	"Ladies Night" (with Atomic Kitten)
2004	"Fresh" (with Liberty X)
2004	"Too Hot" (with Lisa Stansfield)
2004	"Get Down on It" (with Blue & Lil' Kim)
2005	"Hollywood Swinging" (with Jamiroquai)
2005	"No Show" (featuring Blackstreet)
2006	"Steppin' into Love"
2010	"Miss Lead" (ft. Towanna)
2016	"Sexy (Where'd You Get Yours)"
