= Robert "Kool" Bell =

American musician, founding member of Kool & the Gang

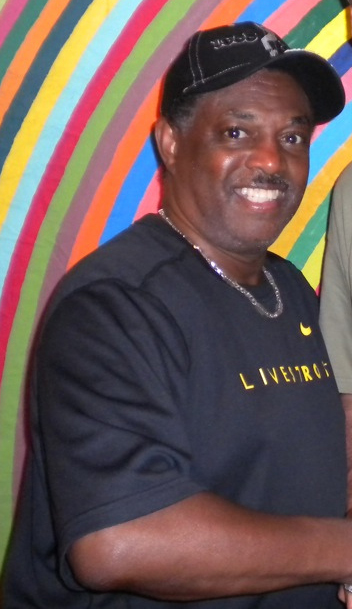
- Bell in 2011

Background information
- Also known as: Kool; Muhammad Bayyan
- Born: Robert Earl Bell; October 8, 1950 (age 76); Youngstown, Ohio, U.S.
- Genres: Jazz; R&B; soul; funk; dance-pop; disco; boogie
- Occupations: Musician; singer; songwriter
- Instruments: Bass guitar; vocals
- Years active: 1964–present
- Labels: De-Lite; Mercury
- Member of: Kool & the Gang
- Formerly of: Band Aid
- Spouse: Deborah Jones (m. 1971; died 2018)

Robert Earl "Kool" Bell (born October 8, 1950), also known by the name Muhammad Bayyan, is an American musician, singer and songwriter. He is the last surviving founding member of the American R&B, soul, funk and disco band Kool & the Gang.

== Early life ==
Bell was born in Youngstown, Ohio, to Aminah Bayyan (1932–2014) and Robert "Bobby" Bell (1929–1985). Bell grew up in Jersey City, New Jersey. Growing up, Bell was nicknamed "Kool", due to being "laid back":

That's a nickname from the neighborhood I grew up in here in Jersey City. It's a faddish thing and I just happened to take the name Kool 'cause I'm kind of a laid back person.

His nickname is spelt 'Kool' with a 'K' as there was another kid in Jersey City who had the nickname 'Cool', spelt the more traditional way.

== Kool & The Gang ==
Along with his brother, Ronald Bell, he began playing jazz, and in 1964 they formed a group named The Jazziacs. Bell was still in Grammar school at the time.

They began playing at clubs in New York City under a series of different band names before settling on the name Kool & the Gang in 1968. Their debut album, Kool and the Gang, was released the following year. The band's first major hit came in 1973, with "Jungle Boogie", which charted at number four on the Billboard Hot 100. Their first number one hit single was "Spirit of the Boogie", which was released in 1975.

Bell, along with Kool & the Gang members James "J.T." Taylor and Dennis Thomas, were a part of the 1984 charity supergroup Band Aid.

Kool & the Gang have won numerous awards, including two Grammy Awards, seven American Music Awards, and, in 2006, a Music Business Association Chairman's Award for artistic achievement. The band recorded nine No. 1 R&B singles in the 1970s and 1980s, including its No. 1 pop single "Celebration". They have seven American Music Awards, 25 Top Ten R&B hits, nine Top Ten Pop hits, and 31 gold and platinum albums. The group is honored on the Hollywood Walk of Fame and was inducted into the Songwriters Hall of Fame. As of 2024, Bell still tours with Kool & the Gang.

In 2024, Bell was inducted into the Rock and Roll Hall of Fame, as a member of Kool & the Gang. Bell said of the induction: "Shoot, it took 60 years in this business before we were inducted. One of the things that I said was that we’ve worked with Elton John, Rod Stewart, Dire Strait, Kid Rock, Dave Matthew Band, and Van Halen. Isn’t that rock and roll?"

== Instruments and playing style ==
Bell has used Fender Precision and Jazz Basses "for a long time", and briefly played a Steinberger bass with a short neck, claiming "with that neck, you’d miss the whole rest of the bassline". In recent years, Bell has performed on stage with Zon basses, a model he was introduced to by the bands guitarist while in a music store in Los Angeles, and according to Bell "I fell in love with that. I found the neck was smaller and didn’t fall out of tune. I became a Zon man".

Bell said of his playing style: "I always hear the drums, and I always try to work with the drummer. The drums and the bass were always together in Kool & the Gang’s music. If you don’t have that for a foundation, no way will the rest of the music stand on top of it."

== Legacy ==
The songs of Kool & The Gang have reportedly been sampled over 1,800 times.

In an interivew, James Brown once said: "I’m the most humble man out there – and Kool, that guy’s number two to me."

== Personal life ==
Bell's younger brother, Ronald Bell, was also a musician, and co-formed the band with Robert in 1964. Both brothers converted to Islam in 1972. Ronald died of undisclosed causes on September 9, 2020.

In 1971, Robert married Deborah Jones. Bell and Jones met when they were teenagers. Deborah died on November 4, 2018, aged 67. Her death was later revealed to have been the result of a long-standing illness. Together, they had two sons, one of whom has worked with Kool & the Gang in the past. He is also the uncle of Big Brother 28 contestant LaTrice Verrett.

Bell lives in Florida.

== See also ==
- List of people from Youngstown, Ohio
- List of people from Jersey City, New Jersey
- Kool & the Gang
