= De-Lite Records =

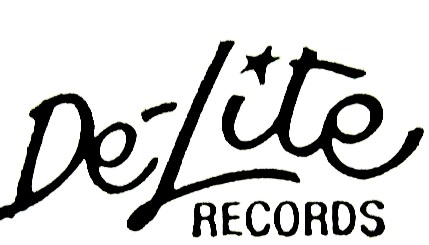
- Parent company: Universal Music Group
- Founded: 1967; 59 years ago (as De-Lite Recorded Sound Corporation)
- Founder: Fred Vigorito, Fred Fioto, Ted Simonetti
- Defunct: 1985
- Status: Inactive
- Distributors: Island Records (United States); Universal Music Distribution (International)
- Genre: R&B
- Country of origin: United States

De-Lite Records, whose formal name was De-Lite Recorded Sound Corporation, was a record label specializing in R&B music from 1969 to 1985; Island Records now manages the De-Lite catalog.

== History ==
De-Lite Records was founded in 1967 by Fred Vigorito (né Frederick Gabriel Vigorito; 1922–2008), Fred Fioto (né Frederick Alfred Fioto; 1920–1999), (Note: Fred Vigorito and Fred Fioto were 1st cousins by way of grandparents, Antonio Fioto (1851–1936) and Carmela M. Cacace (maiden; 1864–1931).) and Ted Simonetti (né Ted Eddy Simonetti; 1902–1985). Prominent on their staff was veteran music producer Gene Redd (né Clarence Eugene Redd Jr.; 1916–1983), father of the late singer Sharon Redd and singer Penny Ford. The very first album released on De-Lite was in 1968: catalog number DE-2001, The New Sounds of the Louis Prima Show, featuring Louis Prima, Sam Butera and the Witnesses, Gia Maione, and Little Richie Varola (né Richard Varhola; 1943–1974).

De-Lite's first single was by an unknown singer named "Mr. Ginger Ale" in 1968, "That Old Feeling"/"Love Walked In", catalog number 509.

One of the label's first signings for popular music was Kool and the Gang, who originally appeared on a precursor label, Red Coach. Their eponymous instrumental single was their first big R&B hit, in the year 1969 ("Kool & The Gang"/"Raw Hamburger", Red Coach R 601; later released as De-Lite 519–0). Kool and the Gang was the most successful act for De-Lite, scoring many hits on the R&B and pop charts.

In the 1970s, Pickwick International took over distribution of the label, and Kool and The Gang's pop success began in 1973 with their first Top 40 crossover hit, "Funky Stuff."

Disco pioneers Crown Heights Affair were signed to the label in 1975, and promptly released "Dreaming a Dream", which reached #5 on Billboard's R&B Singles chart. They followed with the Top 20 hits, "Every Beat of My Heart," "Foxy Lady", and "Dancin'." The album "Dreaming a Dream" was followed by "Do It Your Way" (1976), "Dream World" (1978), "Dance Lady Dance" (1979), and "Sure Shot" (1980).

After PolyGram purchased Pickwick in 1977 it took over distribution of the De-Lite label, which maintained the imprint for Kool And The Gang's releases. In 1985, De-Lite was absorbed into PolyGram sublabel Mercury Records, and Kool and the Gang were transferred there as well. In 1998, Polygram merged with Universal Music Group; their subsidiary Island Records now manages the De-Lite catalog.

== Other De-Lite imprints ==
De-Lite had other imprints as well:

- Gang Records - A boutique label run by Kool and The Gang. Its only two artists were Kool and The Gang's protégé group The Kay Gees, who would later switch to the parent De-Lite label, and Tomorrow's Edition (who put out only two singles, "Be Real" and "Say It Again").
- Vigor Records - A sublabel named after De-Lite co-founder Fred Vigorito, which is notable for the album Soul On Your Side by The Rhythm Makers, an early incarnation of the disco group GQ. GQ is best known for their hit "Disco Nights (Rock-Freak)".
- Red Coach Records - A label founded by Gene Redd; at one time it was distributed by Chess Records, but then it switched distribution to De-Lite. One notable artist was Everyday People, who was the only artist to release an album for the label. In fact, Red Coach was Kool and The Gang's original label, from which their first single was released.
- Red Lite Records - A short-lived subsidiary of De-Lite, which its roster included Johnny Desmond, Crystal Ship, Underground Lite Bulb Co., and others. No albums were issued under this label, but nine singles were issued.
- Jotee Records - An extremely short-lived imprint owned by Joe Tate, which was distributed by De-Lite in 1972. Only one single, "La, La, The Magic Song"/"In the Summer" by The Blendelles was issued.
- Knockout Records - A boutique label owned by boxer Joe Frazier that De-Lite distributed. Only three singles, all by Frazier, were issued.
