= Coolio discography =

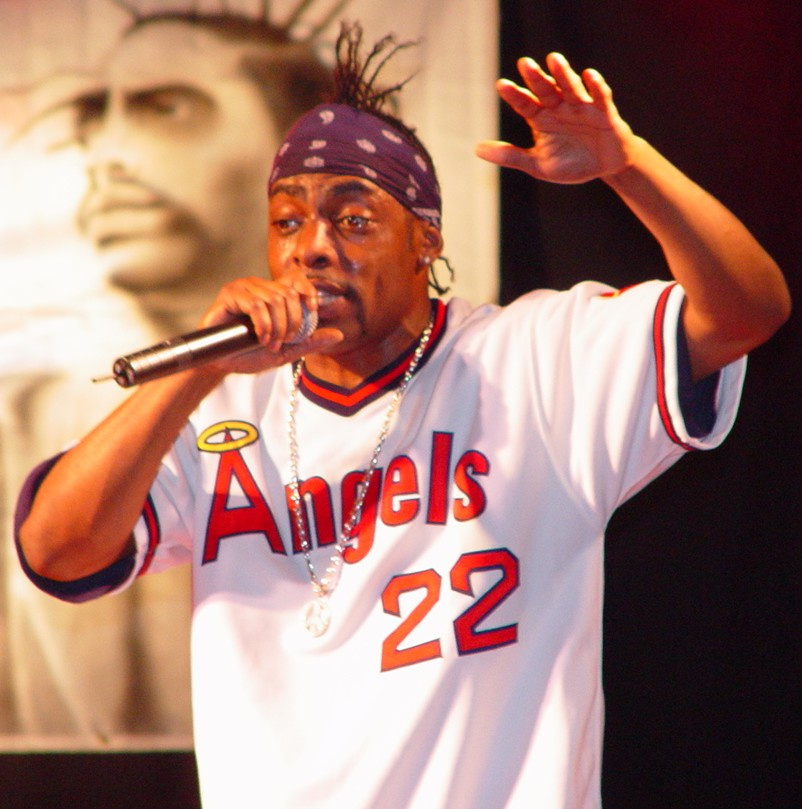
- Coolio at a US Army base in Bosnia (2002)
- Studio albums: 8
- Compilation albums: 2
- Singles: 22
- Music videos: 28

This is the discography of Coolio, an American rapper.

== Albums ==
=== Studio albums ===
List of studio albums, with selected chart positions and certifications
Title	Album details	Peak chart positions										Certifications
Title	Album details	US	AUS	AUT	GER	NLD	NOR	NZ	SWE	SWI	UK	Certifications
It Takes a Thief	Released: July 19, 1994; Label: Tommy Boy, Warner Bros.; Format: CD, LP, cassette, digital download	8	—	—	—	57	—	42	44	—	67	RIAA: Platinum
Gangsta's Paradise	Released: November 7, 1995; Label: Tommy Boy, Warner Bros.; Format: CD, LP, cassette, digital download	9	12	4	6	9	24	5	16	2	18	RIAA: 2× Platinum; ARIA: Gold; BPI: Gold; BVMI: Gold; IFPI SWE: Gold; IFPI SWI: 2× Platinum; NVPI: Gold; RMNZ: Platinum
My Soul	Released: August 26, 1997; Label: Tommy Boy, Warner Bros.; Format: CD, LP, cassette, digital download	39	60	19	19	12	27	20	30	16	28	RIAA: Gold
Coolio.com	Released: April 18, 2001; Label: JVC Victor; Format: CD, digital download	—	—	—	—	—	—	—	—	—	—	
El Cool Magnifico	Released: October 15, 2002; Label: Riviera; Format: CD, digital download	—	—	—	—	—	—	—	—	—	—	
The Return of the Gangsta	Released: October 16, 2006; Label: Hardwax; Format: CD, digital download	—	—	—	—	—	—	—	—	82	—	
Steal Hear	Released: October 28, 2008; Label: Super Cool; Format: CD, digital download	—	—	—	—	—	—	—	—	—	—	
From the Bottom 2 the Top	Released: July 2, 2009; Label: Subside; Format: CD, digital download	—	—	—	—	—	—	—	—	—	—	
"—" denotes a recording that did not chart or was not released in that territory.

=== Compilation albums ===
Title	Album details
The Very Best	Released: April 18, 2001; Label: Tommy Boy; Format: CD; Japan Release Only
Fantastic Voyage: The Greatest Hits	Released: September 14, 2001; Label: Tommy Boy; Format: CD

== Singles ==
=== As lead artist ===
List of singles, with selected chart positions and certifications, showing year released and album name
Title	Year	Peak chart positions										Certifications	Album
Title	Year	US	AUS	AUT	GER	NLD	NOR	NZ	SWE	SWI	UK	Certifications	Album
"Whatcha Gonna Do?"	1987	10^{[A]}	—	—	—	—	—	—	—	—	—	RIAA: Platinum	Non album single
What Makes You Dance (Force Groove)" (featuring Nu-Skool)	1988	5^{[A]}	—	—	—	—	—	—	—	—	—	RIAA: Platinum	Non album single
"County Line"	1993	109^{[A]}	—	—	—	—	—	—	—	—	—	RIAA: Platinum	It Takes a Thief
"I Remember" (featuring J-Ro and Billy Boy)	1994	107^{[B]}	92	—	—	—	—	32	—	—	73	RIAA: Platinum	It Takes a Thief
"Fantastic Voyage"	1994	3	37	—	91	31	—	8	29	—	41	RIAA: Platinum	It Takes a Thief
"Mama, I'm in Love with a Gangsta" (featuring LeShaun)	1994	119^{[C]}	—	—	—	—	—	39	—	—	—	RIAA: Platinum	It Takes a Thief
"The Points" (with the Notorious B.I.G., Redman, Ill Al Skratch, Big Mike, Busta Rhymes, Buckshot and Bone Thugs-n-Harmony)	1995	—	—	—	—	—	—	—	—	—	—		Panther soundtrack
"Gangsta's Paradise" (featuring L.V.)	1995	1	1	1	1	1	1	1	1	1	1	RIAA: 3× Platinum; ARIA: 3× Platinum; BPI: 5× Platinum; BVMI: 2× Platinum; IFPI AUT: Platinum; IFPI NOR: 4× Platinum; NVPI: Platinum; RMNZ: 7× Platinum	Gangsta's Paradise
"Too Hot"	1995	24	42	—	24	10	—	7	35	18	9	RMNZ: Gold	Gangsta's Paradise
"1, 2, 3, 4 (Sumpin' New)"	1996	5	12	—	39	14	14	2	17	—	13	RIAA: Gold; ARIA: Gold; RMNZ: Gold	Gangsta's Paradise
"It's All the Way Live (Now)" (featuring Lakeside)	1996	29	50	—	73	34	—	6	33	—	34	RIAA: Gold; RMNZ: Gold	Eddie soundtrack
"Hit 'Em High (The Monstars' Anthem)" (with B-Real, Method Man, LL Cool J, and Busta Rhymes)	1997	—	—	—	14	5	1	17	10	11	8		Space Jam soundtrack
"C U When U Get There" (featuring 40 Thevz)	1997	12	7	4	3	10	2	4	2	2	3	RIAA: Gold; ARIA: Gold; BPI: Silver; BVMI: Gold; IFPI SWE: Platinum; IFPI SWI: Gold; RMNZ: Platinum	My Soul
"Ooh La La"	1997	—	33	—	80	68	—	2	39	—	14	RMNZ: Gold	My Soul
"The Hustler" (featuring Kenny Rogers)	2001	—	—	—	—	—	—	—	—	—	—		Coolio.com
"I Like Girls"	2003	—	—	—	—	—	—	—	—	—	—		El Cool Magnifico
"Ghetto Square Dance"	2003	—	—	—	—	—	—	—	—	—	—		El Cool Magnifico
"Sunshine"	2003	—	—	—	—	—	—	—	—	—	—		El Cool Magnifico
"Gangsta Walk" (featuring Snoop Dogg and Gangsta-Lu)	2006	—	67	75	—	—	—	—	—	56	67		The Return of the Gangsta
"Boyfriend"	2008	—	—	—	—	—	—	—	—	—	—		Steal Hear
"Change"	2009	—	—	—	—	—	—	—	—	—	—		From the Bottom 2 the Top
"Lady Vs Beat Nouveau"	2009	—	—	—	—	38	—	—	—	—	—		From the Bottom 2 the Top
"Gangsta's Paradise 2K11" (vs. Kylian Mash & Rico Bernasconi)	2011	—	—	—	89	—	—	—	—	—	—		Non-album single
"—" denotes a recording that did not chart or was not released in that territory.

== Guest appearances ==
List of single and non-single guest appearances, with other performing artists, showing year released and album name
Title	Year	Other artist(s)	Album
"California Livin'"	1992	Mac Dre	What's Really Going On?
"In a Twist"	1995	WC and the Maad Circle	Curb Servin'
"Stomp"	1995	Quincy Jones, Yo-Yo, Charlie Wilson, Luniz, Shaquille O'Neal, Chaka Khan	Q's Jook Joint
"Payback"	1995	Montell Jordan	This Is How We Do It
"Runaway (G Man's Hip-Hop Mix)"	1995	Janet Jackson	Non-album single
"Atomic Dog (Dogs of the World Unite Remix)"	1996	George Clinton	Greatest Funkin' Hits
"On My Cide"	1996	Dazzie Dee, Tha Chill	Where's My Receipt
"Connect the Dot"	1996	H-Bomb	In Yo' Face
"Keep It on the Red Light"	1996	Ophélie Winter	No Soucy !
"Drama"	1996	Ras Kass	Soul on Ice
"One for the Money"	1997	40 Thevz	Honor Amongst Thevz
"All Night, All Right"	1997	Peter Andre	Time
"It'll Take a Dollar's Worth"	1998	Ras Kass	Rasassination [20th anniversary edition]
"Just Think About You"	1998	Kele Le Roc	Everybody's Somebody
"No Exit (Loud All-Stars Remix)"	1999	Blondie, U-God, Mobb Deep, Inspectah Deck	No Exit
"it's Alright"	1999	Mimi	Joy Love Happiness
"What Up Loc"	1999	Shorty	Short Stories
"Goodbye" (Intro)	2000	Outlawz	Ride wit Us or Collide wit Us
"In the Hood"	2002	L.V. & Prodeje	The Playground
"Yo"	2003	Rappin' 4-Tay	Gangsta Gumbo
"Soldiergirl"	2005	Leki, Mamido	Warrior Girl
"Peepshow"	2005	XSS	"Peepshow" (Single)
"Hva Er Det Du Venter På"	2008	Erik & Kriss	"Verden Vil Bedras"
"One Night in L.A. / Gangsta Walk"	2010	The Glam	"One Night in L.A." (Single)
"Make It Bump"	2015	Wade Martin	
"Escape Wagon"	2019	Versatile	

== Soundtrack appearances/compilation exclusives ==
Title	Year	Album
"I Remember"	1994	Double Dragon (Music from the Motion Picture Soundtrack)
"Dial a Jam" original	1995	The Jerky Boys: Original Motion Picture Soundtrack
"Rollin' with My Homies" original	1995	Clueless: Original Motion Picture Soundtrack
"Thru the Window" original	1995	New Jersey Drive Vol. 1 (Original Motion Picture Soundtrack)
"Gangsta's Paradise" original	1995	Dangerous Minds: Music from the Motion Picture
"Gangsta's Paradise"	1996	1996 Grammy Nominees
"The Winner" original	1996	Space Jam: Music from and Inspired by the Motion Picture
"Hit 'Em High (The Monstars Anthem)" original	1996	Space Jam: Music from and Inspired by the Motion Picture
"Fantastic Voyage"	1996	All That: The Album
"I Breaks Em Off" original	1996	America Is Dying Slowly
"1, 2, 3, 4 (Sumpin' New)"	1996	ESPN Presents Jock Jams Volume 2
"(It's) All the Way Live (Now)" original	1996	Eddie
"C U When U Get There"	1997	Nothing to Lose
"The Walk"	2001	Held Up
"Dexter (What's His Name?)" original	2002	Dexter's Laboratory: The Hip-Hop Experiment

== Music videos ==
Title	Year	Director(s)
"Ain't Damn Thang Has Changed" (with WC and the Maad Circle)	1991	
"Dress Code" (with WC and the Maad Circle)	1991	
"County Line"	1993	
"I Remember" (feat. J-Ro and Billy Boy)	1994	
"Fantastic Voyage"	1994	
"Mama, I'm in Love with a Gangsta"	1994	
"Dial a Jam"	1994	
"Gangsta's Paradise" (feat. L.V.)	1995	Antoine Fuqua
"Too Hot"	1995	
"The Points" (with The Notorious B.I.G., Doodlebug of the Digable Planets, Big Mike, Buckshot, Redman, Ill Al Skratch, Rock of Heltah Skeltah, Bone Thugs-n-Harmony, Busta Rhymes, Menace Clan, Jamal)	1995	
"1, 2, 3, 4 (Sumpin' New)"	1996	David Dobkin
"It's All the Way Live (Now)"	1996	
"Hit 'Em High (The Monstars' Anthem)" (with B-Real, Method Man, LL Cool J, and Busta Rhymes)	1997	Hype Williams
"The Winner"	1997	
"C U When U Get There" (feat. 40 Thevz)	1997	
"Ooh La La"	1997	
"The Hustler" (feat. Kenny Rogers)	2001	
"Ghetto Square Dance"	2001	
"I Don't Wanna Die" (feat. Krayzie Bone)	2005	Chris Palzis
"Gangsta Walk" (feat. Snoop Dogg and Gangsta-Lu)	2006	Marco Gentile and d2b
"Do It" (feat. Goast)	2006	Davide Enrico Agosta
"Dip It" (feat. Gangsta-Lu)	2006	Luca Tommassini
"Boyfriend" (feat. A.I.)	2008	Leonardo Gonzales
"Change" (vs. Ennio Morricone)	2009	Cosimo Alemà
"Lady Vs Beat Nouveau" (feat. Storm Lee)	2009	
"From the Bottom 2 the Top" (feat. Goast and A.I.)	2009	
"Gangsta's Paradise 2K11" (vs. Kylian Mash & Rico Bernasconi)	2011	
"Take It to the Hub"	2014	
"Escape Wagon"	2019	

== Notes ==
- A "County Line" did not enter the Billboard Hot 100, but peaked at number 9 on the Bubbling Under Hot 100 Singles chart, which acts as a 25-song extension to the Hot 100.
- B "I Remember" did not enter the Billboard Hot 100, but peaked at number 7 on the Bubbling Under Hot 100 Singles chart, which acts as a 25-song extension to the Hot 100.
- C "Mama I'm in Love Wit' a Gangsta" did not enter the Billboard Hot 100, but peaked at number 19 on the Bubbling Under Hot 100 Singles chart, which acts as a 25-song extension to the Hot 100.
