= Fantastic Voyage: The Greatest Hits =

Compilation album by Coolio
- Released: July 17, 2001
- Recorded: 1993–2001
- Genre: West Coast hip hop, G-funk, gangsta rap
- Label: Tommy Boy

Coolio chronology
Coolio.com (2001)	Fantastic Voyage: The Greatest Hits (2001)	El Cool Magnifico (2002)

Professional ratings
Review scores
Source	Rating
AllMusic	4.5/5 stars
Robert Christgau	(3-star Honorable Mention)
The New Rolling Stone Album Guide	3.5/5 stars

Fantastic Voyage: The Greatest Hits is a compilation album by rapper Coolio, released in 2001. It includes the track "Aw Here it Goes," the main theme to TV series Kenan & Kel. Other songs originally appeared on his first three albums, It Takes a Thief, Gangsta's Paradise and My Soul.

== Track listing ==
No.	Title	Writer(s)	Producer(s)	Length
1.	"Fantastic Voyage"	Artis Ivey; Bryan Dobbs; Fred Alexander Jr.; Norman Beavers; Marvin Craig; Tiemeyer McCain; Thomas Shelby; Stephen Shockley; Otis Stokes; Mark Adam Wood Jr.	Dobbs the Wino	5:33
2.	"Gangsta's Paradise" (featuring L.V.)	Ivey; Stevie Wonder; Larry Sanders; Doug Rasheed	Doug Rasheed	4:01
3.	"C U When U Get There" (featuring Forty Thievz)	Ivey; Dominic Aldridge; Henry Straughter; Malieek Straughter	Mr. Dominique De Romeo	5:11
4.	"Too Hot"	Ivey; Dobbs; George Brown	Dobbs the Wino	3:40
5.	"Aw, Here It Goes!" (Theme from Kenan & Kel)	Ivey; Tom Pomposello; Al Goodman; Eugene Pitt		1:02
6.	"Ooh La La"	Ivey; Oji Pierce; Grace Jones; Robbie Shakespeare; Lowell Dunbar; Dana Manno; Diane Warren	Oji Pierce	4:06
7.	"I Remember" (featuring J-Ro of Tha Alkaholiks and Billy Boy)	Ivey; Al Green; Willie Mitchell; Kenneth Gamble; Leon Huff	Gary "G-Luv" Herd; Coolio (co.); Spoon (co.)	4:48
8.	"1, 2, 3, 4 (Sumpin' New)"	Ivey; James Carter; Aldridge; Sylvester Stewart	Jammin James Carter; Poison Ivey	3:22
9.	"Hit Em"	Ivey; John Austin; Carter; Sherwin Charles; S. Williams; Mark Morales; Darren Robinson; Damon Wimbley	Jammin James Carter; I-Roc	4:23
10.	"Mama, I'm in Love with a Gangsta" (featuring LeShaun)	Ivey; Roy Ayers; Ronald Isley; Rudolph Isley; Marvin Isley; Ernie Isley; O'Kelly Isley Jr.; Chris Jasper	Dobbs the Wino	4:10
11.	"My Soul"	Ivey; Aldridge; Austin; Gino Vanelli	Mr. Dominique De Romeo; Kelvin "K2Dat" Taylor (assoc.)	4:16
12.	"County Line"	Ivey; Dobbs; James Alexander; Allen Jones; Mike Beard; Larry Dodson; Charles Allen; Lloyd Smith; Sherman Guy; Frank Thompson; Winston Stewart; Harvey Henderson; Mark Bynum; Sylvia Robinson; Clifton "Jiggs" Chase; Melvin Glover; Edward Fletcher	Dobbs the Wino	2:58
13.	"Geto Highlights"	Ivey; Christopher Hamabe; Devon Davis; Austin	Christopher Hambe; Devon Davis	5:00

Sample credits

- "Fantastic Voyage" contains a sample of "Fantastic Voyage" by Lakeside.
- "Gangsta's Paradise" contains a sample of "Pastime Paradise" by Stevie Wonder.
- "Too Hot" contains an interpolation of "Too Hot", written by George Brown.
- "Aw, Here It Goes!" contains a sample of "Nick's Theme".
- "I Remember" contains elements from "Tomorrow's Dream" by Al Green.
- "1, 2, 3, 4 (Sumpin' New)" contains elements from:
  - "Thighs High (Grip Your Hips More)"; written by Tom Browne, Toni Smith, Sekou Bunch, and Dave Grusin; and performed by Tom Browne.
  - "Wikka Wrap", written by Adrian Sear, and performed by The Evasions.
- "Mama, I'm in Love with a Gangsta" contains elements from:
  - "Mystic Voyage" by Roy Ayers.
  - "Coolin Me Out" by The Isley Brothers.
- "County Line" contains elements from:
  - "Hit and Run" by the Bar-Kays.
  - "Children's Story" by Slick Rick.
  - "The Message" by Grandmaster Flash and the Furious Five.
