= Aída Yéspica =

Venezuelan actress, TV host, and model (born 1982)

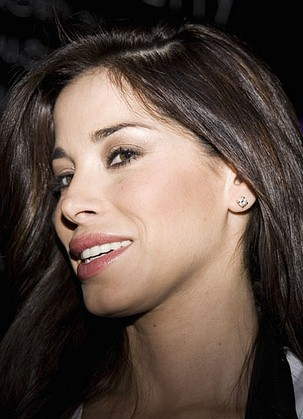
- Yéspica in 2013
- Born: Aída María Yéspica Jaime; 15 July 1982 (age 44); Barquisimeto, Venezuela
- Occupations: Actress; TV host; model
- Partner: Matteo Ferrari (2007–2009)
- Children: 1
- Modeling information
- Height: 173 cm (5 ft 8 in)
- Hair color: Black
- Eye color: Brown

Aída María Yéspica Jaime (Spanish pronunciation: [aˈiða maˈɾi.a ˈʝespika ˈxajme]; born 15 July 1982) is a Venezuelan actress, TV host, model and beauty pageant titleholder. Considered a sex symbol of the 2000s and 2010s, she has participated in variety and reality shows, acted in films and TV programs, posed for several nude calendars, and appeared in television commercials.

== Biography ==
Known as Aída Yéspica or sometimes Aída María Yéspica, her full name is Aída María Yéspica Jaime. She was born in Barquisimeto, Venezuela.

== Career ==
In 2002, Yéspica entered the Miss Venezuela pageant. As Miss Amazonas, she represented the state of Amazonas. Although Mariangel Ruiz won the pageant, Yéspica became a media favorite.

=== Modeling career ===
In 2003, Yéspica moved to Milan, Italy, to start a modeling career. She became well known as a model and showgirl, appearing on covers of Italian magazines (including Maxim, GQ, Max and Fox) and releasing four nude calendars in Italy. She also appeared in various television commercials, including commercials for Braun, Campari, Calze Sanpellegrino, Nissan, and RAS, in which she starred with Sean Connery. In July 2005, she became model and spokesperson for a jewelry line produced by Zancan. In October 2008, during the 8th month of her first pregnancy, she posed naked for the weekly magazine Chi.

Yespica appeared in various music videos in the 2000s, including Cesare Cremonini's Latin Lover; Dip It, by Coolio;Get Involved by Ginuwine; and You Know Ain’t Love by R.J. featuring Pitbull.

In 2012, she posed for the cover of Playboy Italia.

From late 2013 to late 2016 Yéspica worked in USA as a model. She continued to model for Italian brands including Pitti Immagine and La Dolce Vita. In May 2018, Yéspica was la madrina dell'evento for the SBK World Championship at the Imola racetrack. In September 2018, she launched a "capsule collection" of shoes for the brand Easy'nRose, for spring-summer 2019.

=== Television and acting ===
Yéspica has appeared in reality TV shows including L'isola dei Famosi 2 (the Italian version of Celebrity Survivor) aired in Italy by Rai 2 in 2004, Supervivientes (the Spanish version of Survivor) in Spain in 2006, L'isola dei Famosi 9 (the Heroes season) in Italy in 2012, Grande Fratello VIP 2 (the Italian version of Celebrity Big Brother) in 2017.

She has also appeared in various television programs, starting with a role on Bulldozer in 2003. In 2005, she became the primadonna of the variety show Torte in faccia. In 2007, she became the primadonna of the variety show E io pago and the following year, she became the primadonna of Gabbia di matti, another Canale 5 variety show. In late 2008, she suffered from postpartum depression, which slowed down her television career. Since December 2017, she has been a commentator (opinionista fissa) in the Italian sports talk showTiki Taka - Il calcio è il nostro gioco.

In spring 2004, Yéspica had an acting role in Sformat, an Italian satirical sitcom. She was the female lead and executive producer of the short film UnderSense in 2013. Also in 2013, she acted in the short film The Night Club - Osare per credere directed by Lory Del Santo.

== Personal life ==
From 2007 to 2009 Yéspica was in a relationship with Matteo Ferrari, an Italian footballer. Yéspica and Ferrari have a son, Aron Ferrari, born on 27 November 2008. Shortly after Aron's birth, Yéspica suffered from postpartum depression, which impacted her career.

== Filmography ==
- Sformat - direction of Cristian Biondani, sitcom (Rai 2, 2004)
- Domani è un'altra truffa - direction of Pier Francesco Pingitore, TV movie (Canale 5, 2006)
- Di che peccato sei? - direction of Pier Francesco Pingitore, TV movie (Canale 5, 2007)
- Natale in crociera, direction of Neri Parenti, film (2007)
- UnderSense, direction of Simona Ilaria di Michele, short film (2013)
- The Night Club - Osare per credere, direction of Lory Del Santo, short film (2013)
