= Cookin' with Coolio =

- Presented by: Coolio
- Country of origin: United States

Production
- Producer: Elan Gale

Original release
- Network: My Damn Channel

Cookin' with Coolio is a web-based cooking instruction program which hosted by West Coast rapper Coolio. The show is an offshoot of his reality show Coolio's Rules. It appears on the web video network My Damn Channel and is produced by Dead Crow Pictures. The show is also a promotion for a cookbook by Coolio of the same name.

Coolio often referred to himself as the "ghetto Martha Stewart" and the "black Rachael Ray." He started cooking when he was young, and learned with simple ingredients as he lacked basic necessities to prepare elaborate dishes.
