= Oji Pierce =

American musical artist (1980–2019)

- Born: Phillip Primes Pierce; April 26, 1969; Statesville, North Carolina
- Died: August 21, 2006 (aged 46) Gallup, New Mexico
- Occupations: Songwriter; Producer; Keyboardist; Engineer

Phillip "Oji" Primes Pierce (May 13, 1960 – August 21, 2006) was an American record producer, composer, keyboardist, and engineer who had collaborated with a number of music artists in the 1990s and early 2000s.

== Early life ==
Pierce, the only son of Henry Primes Pierce and Rosella Harris Vaughn, was born in Statesville, North Carolina. He had two sisters, Dyrel and Ledra. Pierce received his primary and secondary education in the District of Columbia school system.

== Career ==
Musically shaped by the church, Pierce's career as a songwriter, producer and arranger took off when he produced singer Montell Jordan's debut album This Is How We Do It (1995), along with its number-one title track. While the song earned Jordan a Grammy Award nomination for Best Male R&B Vocal Performance at the 38th Annual Grammy Awards, it won him and Pierce Best R&B 12-inch at the International Dance Music Awards in Miami. Following the success with Jordan, Pierce became a sought-after producer in the R&B and hip hop scene, working with artists such as Kenny Lattimore, Norman Brown, CeCe Peniston, and Coolio, for whose album My Soul (1997) he contributed the single "Ooh La La." In the late 1990s, he became instrumental in securing R&B duo Ruff Endz a recording deal with Epic Records.

== Death ==
Pierce died on August 21, 2006, at the age of 46, in Gallup, New Mexico after a battle with sarcoidosis.

== Selected production discography ==
Name of song, featured performers, originating album, year released and specified role.
Year	Title	Artist	Album	Songwriter	Producer	Ref(s).
1995	"Somethin' 4 da Honeyz"	Montell Jordan	This Is How We Do It	check	check	
1995	"This Is How We Do It"	Montell Jordan	This Is How We Do It	check	check	
1996	"Always Remember"	Kenny Lattimore	Kenny Lattimore	check	check	
1997	"Ooh La La"	Coolio	My Soul	check	check	
1999	"You Make Me Feel Brand New"	Norman Brown	Celebration		check	
2000	"One More Chance"	Anastacia	Not That Kind	check		
2000	"Undercover"	Paul Taylor	Undercover	check	check	
2000	"Love Crimes"	Ruff Endz	Love Crimes	check	check	
