= It's All the Way Live (Now) =

Single by Coolio

from the album Eddie (soundtrack)
- Released: May 14, 1996
- Recorded: 1995
- Genre: Hip hop
- Length: 4:19
- Label: Hollywood
- Songwriters: Artis Leon Ivey, Jr.
- Producers: Bryan Wino Dobbs; Brian G.

Coolio singles chronology
"1, 2, 3, 4 (Sumpin' New)" (1996)	"It's All the Way Live (Now)" (1996)	"The Winner" (1997)

"It's All the Way Live (Now)" is a song by American rapper Coolio. It was released in May 1996, by Hollywood Records, as the lead single to the Eddie soundtrack. The song became Coolio's fifth top-40 single and his fourth to achieve at least a gold certification from the RIAA for sales of 500,000 copies. The song sampled "It's All the Way Live" by funk band Lakeside, his second single to both sample and take the name from a Lakeside song after his 1994 hit, "Fantastic Voyage".

Despite being one of Coolio's biggest hits, the song did not appear on his 2001 Tommy Boy Records Greatest Hits compilation. This was due to the fact Hollywood Records, who released the Eddie soundtrack, owned the rights to the song.

== Critical reception ==
British magazine Music Week gave the song a score of three out of five, describing it as "a smoothly-produced cover" from the new basketball comedy Eddie. They also noted that the original recorders, Lakeside, perform on the track too.

== Single track listing ==
1. "It's All the Way Live (Now)" – 3:36
2. "1, 2, 3, 4 (Sumpin' New)" (Timber mix) – 3:21

== Charts ==
=== Weekly charts ===
Chart (1996)	Peak position
Australia (ARIA)	50
Canada (Nielsen SoundScan)	17
Europe (European Dance Radio)	20
Germany (GfK)	73
Hungary (Mahasz)	1
Netherlands (Dutch Top 40 Tipparade)	6
Netherlands (Single Top 100)	34
New Zealand (Recorded Music NZ)	6
Scottish Singles Sales (Official Charts)	46
Sweden (Sverigetopplistan)	33
UK Singles (Official Charts)	34
UK Hip Hop/R&B (Official Charts)	7
US Billboard Hot 100	29
US Dance Singles Sales (Billboard)	32
US Hot R&B/Hip-Hop Songs (Billboard)	47
US Hot Rap Songs (Billboard)	9
US Rhythmic Airplay (Billboard)	23
US Cash Box Top 100	22

=== Year-end charts ===
Chart (1996)	Position
New Zealand (Recorded Music NZ)	20

== Certifications ==
Region	Certification	Certified units/sales
United States (RIAA)	Gold	500,000^{^}
^{^} Shipments figures based on certification alone.
