= Steal Hear =

Studio album by Coolio
- Released: October 28, 2008
- Studio: Top Jazz Recording Studio; The IceBox (Glendale, CA)
- Genre: West Coast hip hop
- Length: 1:01:42
- Label: Super Cool Entertainment
- Producer: Coolio (exec.); Big Fish; Black Thompson; Kenneth Blue; Mac Mozart; Pallaz; Peter Catera; Polarbear; Rob Lowe; Sergio Fertitta; Vic C.

Coolio chronology
The Return of the Gangsta (2006)	Steal Hear (2008)	From the Bottom 2 the Top (2009)

Singles from Steal Hear
- 1. "Gangsta Walk" Released: September 18, 2006

Professional ratings
Review scores
Source	Rating
AllMusic	3/5 stars

Steal Hear is the seventh studio album by American hip hop recording artist Coolio. It was released on October 28, 2008, via Super Cool Recordings. The only single is Gangsta Walk, which features Snoop Dogg, and was released in 2006, on Coolio's fifth album. Most songs on this album were taken from Coolio's previous studio album The Return of the Gangsta, which was released in 2006.

== Track listing ==
Track list confirmed by iTunes and songwriting credits are confirmed by AllMusic.

No.	Title	Lyrics	Music	Length
1.	"Gangsta Walk" (featuring Snoop Dogg and Gangsta Lu)	Artis Ivey, Jr.	Sergio Fertitta	3:57
2.	"Cruise Off"	Ivey, Jr.	A. "Pallaz" Pallas; Massimiliano "Big Fish" Dagani	4:57
3.	"They Don't Know" (featuring Black Orchid)	Ivey, Jr.	Polarbear	3:54
4.	"It's On"	Ivey, Jr.	Victor Concepcion	3:46
5.	"Boyfriend" (featuring A.I.)	Ivey, Jr.; Artis Ivey III	A. "Pallaz" Pallas; Massimiliano "Big Fish" Dagani	4:19
6.	"Do It" (featuring Goast)	Ivey, Jr.; Blair A. Bryson	Sergio Fertitta	4:19
7.	"Lady and a Gangsta" (featuring K-La)	Ivey, Jr.	Sergio Fertitta	4:24
8.	"Make Money" (featuring Gangsta Lu)	Ivey, Jr.	Sergio Fertitta	4:16
9.	"Back It Up Now" (featuring Vizhun, Goast and Emo)	Ivey, Jr.; Erik Moseley; Victor Nelson	Victor Concepcion	3:52
10.	"Keep on Dancing"	Ivey, Jr.	Peter Catera	3:49
11.	"Dip It" (featuring Gangsta Lu)	Ivey, Jr.; Luis Montanino	Sergio Fertitta	3:31
12.	"Motivation" (featuring A.I.)	Ivey, Jr.; Ivey III	A. "Pallaz" Pallas; Massimiliano "Big Fish" Dagani	4:26
13.	"One More Night" (featuring L.V.)	Ivey, Jr.	Kenneth Blue	4:08
14.	"Here We Come"	Ivey, Jr.	Black Thompson; Rob Lowe	4:37
15.	"Keep It Gangsta"	Ivey, Jr.	Mozart; Rob Lowe	4:13
Total length:				1:01:42

== Personnel ==
Credits are adapted from AllMusic and Discogs.

- Artis "Coolio" Ivey Jr. – main artist, executive producer
- Calvin "Snoop Dogg" Broadus – featured artist (track 1)
- Black Orchid – featured artist (track 3)
- Artis "A.I." Ivey III – featured artist (tracks: 5, 12)
- Gangsta-Lu – featured artist (tracks: 8, 11), additional vocals (track 1)
- Blair "Goast" Bryson – featured artist (tracks: 6, 9)
- Miss K-La – featured artist (track 7)
- Emo – featured artist (track 9)
- Vizhun – featured artist (track 9)
- Larry "LV" Sanders – featured artist (track 13)
- Sergio Fertitta – keyboards, drum programming, arranger, engineer, producer (tracks: 1, 6–8, 11)
- Chris Muzik – guitar (tracks: 1, 6–8, 11), electric bass (tracks: 6–8, 11)
- Massimiliano "Big Fish" Dagani – producer (tracks: 2, 5, 12)
- A. Pallaz – producer (tracks: 2, 5, 12)
- Polar Bear – producer (track 3)
- Victor Concepcion – producer (tracks: 4, 9)
- Peter Catera – producer (track 10)
- Toni Cottura – producer (track 10)
- Kenneth Blue – producer (track 13)
- R. "Rob Lowe" Mixon – producer (tracks: 14, 15)
- Black Thompson – producer (track 14)
- David "Mozart" Korkis – producer (track 15)
- Jarel "Jarez" Posey – vocals engineering (track 1), recording, mixing, engineering, art direction
- Dave Pensado – mixing (track 13)
