= Undercover (Paul Taylor album) =

Studio album by Paul Taylor
- Released: February 22, 2000
- Studio: Cheyenne Mountain Ranch Studios (Woodland Park, Colorado); The Compound (Las Vegas, Nevada); Reel Time Studios (Woodland Hills, California); MAS Sound (North Hollywood, California); Adwin Studios and Paramount Recording Studios (Hollywood, California)
- Genre: Jazz
- Length: 44:23
- Label: N2K Records
- Producer: Maurice White; Bill Meyers; Dino Esposito; Scot Rammer; Russ Freeman; Michael Kurt Johnson; Michael Angelo Saulsberry; Oji Pierce

Undercover is an album by Paul Taylor which was released in February 2000 on N2K Records. The album peaked at No. 3 on the US Billboard Top Contemporary Jazz Albums chart and No. 27 on the US Billboard Top Independent Albums chart.

== Critical reception ==
Professional ratings
Review scores
Source	Rating
AllMusic	4/5 stars

Jonathan Widran of AllMusic, in a 4/5-star review proclaimed, "While Taylor's last album, Pleasure Seeker, featured loads of attractive trip-hop atmosphere along with synth and percussion effects, sparseness is the buzzword this time."

== Track listing ==
No.	Title	Writer(s)	Length
1.	"Aerial"	Bill Meyers, Paul Taylor	4:22
2.	"Velvet Rope"	Janet Jackson, Jimmy Jam and Terry Lewis, René Elizondo Jr., Trevor Horn, Malcolm McLaren, Mike Oldfield	4;25
3.	"Movin' On"	Meyers, Taylor	4:06
4.	"Avenue"	Taylor	3:58
5.	"My Love"	Taylor, Michael Kurt Jackson, Michael Angelo Saulsberry	5:33
6.	"Alone With You"	Taylor	4:16
7.	"Code Blue"	Meyers, Taylor	4:02
8.	"Indigo"	Taylor	4:01
9.	"Undercover"	Taylor, Oji Pierce	4:50
10.	"Looking Glass"	Meyers, Taylor	4:41

== Credits ==
=== Musicians ===
- Paul Taylor – soprano saxophone (1, 2, 5, 6, 8, 10), alto saxophone (3, 4, 7, 9), keyboards (3)
- Jimi Randolph – keyboards (1, 3, 7, 10), drum programming (1, 3, 7, 10), trumpet, flugelhorn, horn arrangements
- Dino Esposito – keyboard programming (2, 6, 8), MIDI controller (2, 6, 8), drum programming (2, 6, 8)
- Scot Rammer – keyboard programming (2, 6, 8), MIDI controller (2, 6, 8), drum programming (2, 6, 8)
- Michael Kurt Jackson – keyboards (4), drum programming (4), vocals (5)
- Portrait – instruments (5)
- Oji Pierce – instruments (9)
- Michael Thompson – guitars (1, 7, 10)
- Brian Monroney – guitars (2, 6, 8)
- Russ Freeman – guitars (3)
- Munyungo Jackson – percussion (1, 3, 7, 10)

=== Production ===
- Carl Griffin – executive producer
- Andi Howard – executive producer, management
- Hyman Katz – executive producer
- Bill Meyers – producer (1, 3, 7, 10)
- Maurice White – producer (1, 3, 7, 10)
- Dino Esposito – producer (2, 6, 8), engineer
- Scot Rammer – producer (2, 6, 8), engineer (2, 6, 8)
- Michael Kurt Jackson – producer (4)
- Michael Angelo Saulsberry – producer (5), engineer (5), mixing (5)
- Oji Pierce – producer (9), engineer (9), mixing (9)
- Paul Klingberg – engineer (1, 3, 7, 10)
- Scott Blockland – mixing (1, 3, 7, 10)
- Russ Freeman – mixing (1, 3, 7, 10), additional recording (1, 3, 7, 10), producer (3)
- Nick Sodano – mixing (2, 6, 8)
- Rick Camp – recording (4), mixing (4)
- Cameron Marcarelli – assistant engineer (1, 3, 7, 10)
- Sonny Mediana – art direction, photography
- MAD Design – art direction, photography
- Gardner Howard Ringe Entertainment – management

== Charts ==
Chart (2000)	Peak position
US Top Independent Albums (Billboard)	27
US Top Contemporary Jazz Albums (Billboard)	3
