= Eddie (soundtrack) =

Eddie - The Soundtrack

Soundtrack album by various artists
- Released: May 21, 1996
- Recorded: 1995–1996
- Genre: Hip hop; R&B
- Length: 1:36:21
- Label: Hollywood; Island
- Producer: Hiriam Hicks (exec.); Kathy Nelson (exec.); Brian G; Chris Stokes; Claudio Cueni; Crazy C; Darren "DJ Spin" Rudnick; Doug Deangelis; Fredwreck; Joe Galdo; Mario Winans; Mr. Dalvin; Myron; Richard 'G'; Sam E. Swing; Scheme Team Productions; Stanley Brown; Stan "The Guitar Man" Jones; Bryan Wino Dobbs

Singles from Eddie
- 1. "It's All the Way Live (Now)" Released: May 14, 1996; 2. "Tell Me" Released: August 20, 1996

Eddie: The Soundtrack is the soundtrack album to Steve Rash's 1996 film Eddie. It was released on May 21, 1996 through Hollywood Records/Island Black Music and consisted of contemporary R&B and hip hop. The album peaked at 119 on the Billboard 200 and 44 on the Top R&B/Hip-Hop Albums. Two singles made it to the charts, "Say It Again" which was a minor hit on the R&B charts and both the successful hits "Tell Me", and "It's All the Way Live (Now)".

== Track listing ==
No.	Title	Writer(s)	Producer(s)	Length
1.	"It's All the Way Live (Now)" (performed by Coolio)	Artis Ivey Jr; Fred Lewis	Bryan Wino Dobbs; Brian "G"; Stan "The Guitar Man" Jones^{[c]}	4:19
2.	"Ain't No Love" (performed by 40 Thevz)	Aaron Harris; Donald Fagen; Henry Straughter; Leek Ratt; Walter Becker	Aaron Elijah; Brian "G"^{[a]}; Stan "The Guitar Man" Jones^{[a]}; Coolio^{[e]}	4:08
3.	"Where Ya At?" (performed by Ill Al Skratch)	Simon Cullins	Crazy C	4:40
4.	"Punch Drunk" (performed by House of Pain)	Erik Schrody; Danny O'Connor; Marc Richardson; Jimmy Castor	Scheme Team Productions	3:31
5.	"Da Dribbol" (performed by N.B. Hey)	Freddy Garcia; Joe Galdo; John Courtney; Steven Roybal	Joe Galdo	3:48
6.	"Scarred" (performed by Luke)	Luther Campbell; Maurice Young; Larry Dobson	Darren "D.J. Spin" Rudnick	3:30
7.	"After Last Night" (performed by Jodeci)	Cedric Hailey; Dalvin DeGrate	Mr. Dalvin	4:05
8.	"Say It Again" (performed by Nneka)	Mario Winans; Donnie Boynton; Kenneth Hickson	Mario Winans	4:24
9.	"Tell Me" (performed by Dru Hill)	Stanley Brown; Myron Davis; Alex Cantrall	Stanley Brown; Benjamin Love^{[c]}	4:13
10.	"Sistas" (performed by Myron)	Davis; Cantrall; John Vaughan	Myron; Stanley Brown^{[c]}	4:00
11.	"Say That You're Ready" (performed by J'Son)	Chris Stokes; Claudio Cueni	Chris Stokes; Claudio Cueni	4:02
12.	"Rain Falls" (performed by Darcus)	Charlene Cockett; Brown	Stanley Brown; Joe "Flip" Wilson^{[c]}	4:07
13.	"Skills" (performed by Stanley Clarke)	Stanley Clarke; Farid Nassar	Fredwreck; Richard 'G'	4:39
14.	"Step up to the Line" (performed by Mighty Reel and Kimberly Blake)	Dave Schommer; Sam Hollander; Kimberly Blake; Doug Deangelis	Doug Deangelis; Sam E. Swing	3:55
Total length:				1:36:21

Notes

- ^{^[a]} signifies an additional producer
- ^{^[c]} signifies a co-producer
- ^{^[e]} signifies an executive producer

== Charts ==
Chart (1996)	Peak position
US Billboard 200	119
US Top R&B Albums (Billboard)	44
