= Ladies' Night (album) =

- Standard artwork

Studio album by Kool & the Gang
- Released: September, 1979
- Recorded: 1978–1979
- Genre: Disco; R&B; synth-funk
- Length: 34:05
- Label: De-Lite
- Producer: Eumir Deodato

Kool & the Gang chronology
Everybody's Dancin' (1978)	Ladies' Night (1979)	Celebrate! (1980)

Singles from Ladies' Night
- 1. "Ladies' Night" Released: August 21, 1979; 2. "Too Hot" Released: January, 1980; 3. "Hangin' Out" Released: April 1980

Ladies' Night is the eleventh studio album by the American band Kool & the Gang, released in 1979. It became their first Platinum success, spurred on by two million selling Top Ten singles: the title track "Ladies' Night," (No. 4 in Cash Box; No. 8 in Billboard) and "Too Hot" (No. 5 in Billboard).

The album returned them to the mainstream after a lull in their popularity. Ladies' Night hit number one on the U.S. R&B chart. All the cuts from the album reached number five on the disco chart.

With Ladies' Night, Kool & the Gang made their funk style more mainstream by incorporating some pop and light R&B into the sound. The result was that this album was not only popular during the 1970s black-oriented funk era where the band started, but also during the more popular and diverse disco era. Ladies' Night became their first million selling LP. It also marked the debut of lead vocalist James "J.T." Taylor.

== Critical reception ==
Professional ratings
Review scores
Source	Rating
AllMusic	2/5 stars
Rolling Stone	(mixed)
The Virgin Encyclopedia of R&B and Soul	3/5 stars

The Bay State Banner noted the "lighter sound, one that places the once prominent horns in the background and depends on softer, more implied rhythms but wisely emphasizes the boogie ethic."

== Track listing ==
All tracks are written by Ronald Bell, Kool & the Gang, except where noted.

Side A
No.	Title	Writer(s)	Length
1.	"Ladies' Night"	George Brown, Kool & the Gang	6:38
2.	"Got You into My Life"		4:25
3.	"If You Feel Like Dancin'"		5:05

Side B
No.	Title	Writer(s)	Length
1.	"Hangin' Out"		5:31
2.	"Tonight's the Night"		7:21
3.	"Too Hot"	Brown, Kool & the Gang	5:05

== Personnel ==
Musical

- James "J.T." Taylor – lead and backing vocals
- Ronald Bell – tenor saxophone, backing vocals, keyboards, bass
- Dennis "D.T." Thomas – alto saxophone, backing vocals
- Claydes Smith – guitars
- Eumir Deodato – keyboards
- Adam Ippolito – keyboards
- Robert "Kool" Bell – bass, backing vocals
- George "Funky" Brown – drums, backing vocals
- Clifford Adams – trombone
- Christine Albert – trumpet
- Robert "Spike" Mickens – trumpet
- Jon Faddis – trumpet
- Cedric Toon – backing vocals
- Earl Toon – backing vocals
- Something Sweet (Diane Cameron, Cynthia Huggins, Joan Motley) – backing vocals

Technical

- Mike Doud – art direction
- Joe Kotleba – cover design
- Raul Vega – photography
- Joe Gastwirt – CD mastering and CD digital remastering

== Charts ==
=== Weekly charts ===
Chart (1979)	Peak position
Dutch Albums (Album Top 100)	43
US Billboard 200	13
US Top R&B/Hip-Hop Albums (Billboard)	1

=== Year-end charts ===
Chart (1980)	Position
US Billboard 200	11

=== Singles ===
Year	Title	Chart	Peak position
1979	Ladies' Night	US Billboard R&B	1
1979	Ladies' Night	US Billboard Hot 100	8
1979	Ladies' Night	UK Singles Chart	9
1980	"Too Hot"	US Billboard R&B	3
1980	"Too Hot"	US Billboard Hot 100	5
1980	"Too Hot"	UK Singles Chart	23
1980	Hangin' Out	US Billboard R&B	36
1980	Hangin' Out	UK Singles Chart	52

== Certifications ==
Region	Certification	Certified units/sales
United States (RIAA)	Platinum	1,000,000^{^}
^{^} Shipments figures based on certification alone.

== See also ==
- List of number-one R&B albums of 1979 (U.S.)
