= The One That Got Away (American TV series) =

American dating reality television series

- Genre: Reality
- Starring: Betty Who
- Country of origin: United States
- Original language: English
- No. of seasons: 1
- No. of episodes: 10

Production
- Executive producers: Elan Gale; Caroline Roseman; Gabe Turner
- Production companies: Amazon Studios; Fulwell 73

Original release
- Network: Amazon Prime Video
- Release: June 24, 2022

The One That Got Away is an American dating reality television series hosted by singer-songwriter Betty Who. It premiered on Amazon Prime Video on June 24, 2022.

== Summary ==
The series follows six single people searching for their soulmate. It gives them the opportunity to reconnect with their missed connections, as each participant gets to interact with people from their pasts through a device called "The Portal".

Elan Gale serves as showrunner and executive producer, with Caroline Roseman and Gabe Turner also executive producing.

== Cast ==
- Betty Who
- Allyssa Anderson
- Jeffrey Perla
- Ashley Algarin
- Kasey Ma
- Nigel Sydnor
- Vince Xu

== Release ==
The official trailer was released on June 8, 2022. All 10 episodes of the series premiered on Amazon Prime Video on June 24, 2022.
