= Elan Gale =

American author and television producer (born 1983)

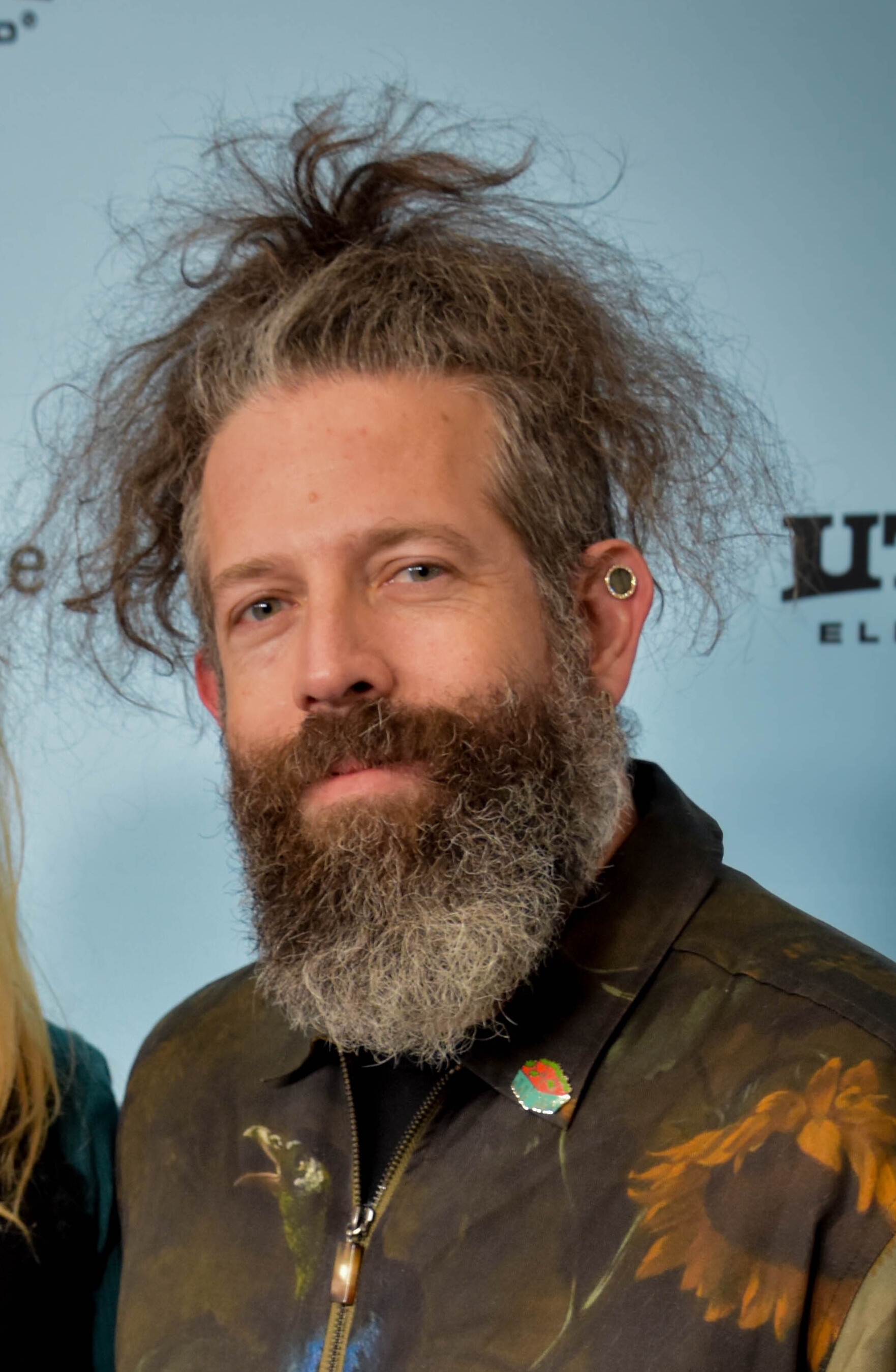
- Gale in 2025
- Born: October 27, 1983 (age 42); Los Angeles County, California, U.S.
- Occupations: Author, television writer, television producer
- Known for: The Bachelor; FBOY Island
- Spouse: Molly C. Quinn (m. 2024)

Elan Gale (born October 27, 1983) is an American author, television writer, and television producer.

== Early life ==
Gale was born in Los Angeles County, California.

== Career ==
Gale worked on the reality series The Bachelor and created FBoy Island. Gale also produced The Bachelorette, Bachelor Pad, Bachelor in Paradise and High School Reunion.

In April 2023, he entered into an overall deal with ITV America.

== Bibliography ==
- It's Never Too Late to Go Back to Bed (calendar 2019-2026)
- You're Not That Great (but neither is anyone else) (2017)

== Filmography ==
=== Writer and producer ===
- Carrie - supervising producer, writer (2026)
- The Midnight Club - co-producer, writer (2022)
- The One That Got Away - executive producer (showrunner) (2022)
- Midnight Mass - consulting producer, writer (2021)
- FBoy Island - TV series, creator, executive producer (2021–23)
- The Bachelor - TV series, executive producer (2010–19)
- The Bachelorette - TV series, executive producer (2009–18)
- Bachelor in Paradise - TV series, executive producer (2014–2018)
- Bachelor Pad - TV series, senior producer (2010–2012)
- Looking for Lenny - Documentary, producer (2011)
- High School Reunion - TV series, field producer (2010)
- The Cougar - TV series, segment producer (2009)
- Coolio's Rules - TV series, consulting producer (2008)
- Cookin' with Coolio - TV series, producer (2008)

=== Actor ===
- Uncredited appearance in Guardians of the Galaxy Vol. 2 (2017)
- Appears in Guardians of the Galaxy Vol. 3 as the Beardy Ravager
- Appears in an episode of The Haunting of Hill House on Netflix (2018)

=== Director ===
- Looking for Lenny - Director and producer (2011), a documentary about Lenny Bruce
