= Ooh La La (Coolio song) =

1997 single by Coolio

Single by Coolio

from the album My Soul
- Released: September 9, 1997
- Studio: Echo Sound (Los Angeles)
- Length: 4:05
- Label: Tommy Boy
- Songwriters: Artis Ivey Jr.; Oji Pierce; Grace Jones; Robbie Shakespeare; Lowell Dunbar; Dana Manno; Diane Warren
- Producer: Oji Pierce

Coolio singles chronology
| "C U When U Get There" (1997) | "Ooh La La" (1997) | "The Hustler" (2001) |

Music video
- "Ooh La La" on YouTube

"Ooh La La" is a song by American rapper Coolio, released as the second single from his third solo album, My Soul (1997), on September 9, 1997. The song contains a sample of "Pull Up to the Bumper" by Grace Jones, so Jones, Sly and Robbie, and Dana Manno were given writing credits. The song did not chart on the US Billboard Hot 100 but became a top-40 hit in other countries, including New Zealand, where it reached number two and was certified gold by the Recording Industry Association of New Zealand (RIANZ).

== Critical reception ==
British magazine Music Week rated the song three out of five, adding, "Gap Band-style funk meets the hookline of Pull Up To The Bumper on this feel-good single, providing an ideal basis for Coolio's slick rapping." Alan Jones stated that the rapper's "run of success is likely to continue" with "Ooh La La". He concluded, "A bit of a throwaway compared to the mighty Gangsta's Paradise, (...) with Coolio's rhymes surprisingiy trite and childish but no less commercial for it."

== Music video ==
The accompanying music video for "Ooh La La" was directed by American director G. Thomas. It begins with Coolio eating breakfast while "Hit Em'" from My Soul plays. The mailman throws a newspaper through Coolio's window, hitting him in the side of the head. Coolio opens the newspaper and reads "Today you will find the Love of your Life, BUT BEWARE, she will NOT REVEAL herself to you. You MUST FIND HER". Coolio then goes about his day doing laundry, grocery shopping, and using an elevator, all while attempting to find the love of his life. After no success, he resorts to spiking a girl's drink with a love potion, serving it to her at a restaurant while posing as a waiter. After a mix up, an elderly woman drinks the love potion, much to Coolio's dismay. Coolio promptly runs away. Later that day Coolio is sitting in his car when a limo pulls up. The window opens and it appears to be the girl from the elevator. She hands something to Coolio before driving away. After the limo pulls out of the frame, the elderly woman is behind it, waving to Coolio. Coolio notices and quickly starts his car to drive away.

== Track listings ==
- Australian CD single
1. "Ooh La La" (radio edit)
2. "Ooh La La" (Tuff Jam's club mix)
3. "Ooh La La" (instrumental)
4. "Ooh La La" (Tuff Jam's UVM instrumental)
5. "C U When U Get There" (Coolio's album version)
- UK 12-inch single

A1. "Ooh La La" (Tuff Jam's UVM dub) – 6:01
A2. "Ooh La La" (Tuff Jam's club instrumental) – 6:26
B1. "Ooh La La" (Tuff Jam's club mix) – 6:40
B2. "Ooh La La" (album version) – 4:05

- UK CD1
1. "Ooh La La" (album version) – 4:05
2. "2 Minutes & 21 Seconds of Funk" – 2:24
3. "Geto Highlites" (featuring 40 Thevz) – 4:59
4. "County Line" – 2:57
- UK CD2 and cassette single
1. "Ooh La La" (radio edit) – 4:06
2. "Ooh La La" (instrumental) – 4:07

== Charts ==
| Chart (1997) | Peak position |
|---|---|
| Australia (ARIA) | 33 |
| Belgium (Ultratop 50 Flanders) | 44 |
| Europe (Eurochart Hot 100) | 58 |
| Finland (Suomen virallinen lista) | 11 |
| Germany (GfK) | 80 |
| Iceland (Íslenski Listinn Topp 40) | 28 |
| Netherlands (Single Top 100) | 68 |
| New Zealand (Recorded Music NZ) | 2 |
| Scotland Singles (OCC) | 23 |
| Sweden (Sverigetopplistan) | 39 |
| UK Singles (OCC) | 14 |
| UK Indie (OCC) | 3 |
| UK Hip Hop/R&B (OCC) | 5 |

== Certifications ==
| Region | Certification | Certified units/sales |
|---|---|---|
| New Zealand (RMNZ) | Gold | 5,000^{*} |
^{*} Sales figures based on certification alone.
