= Too Hot (Kool & the Gang song) =

1980 single by Kool & the Gang

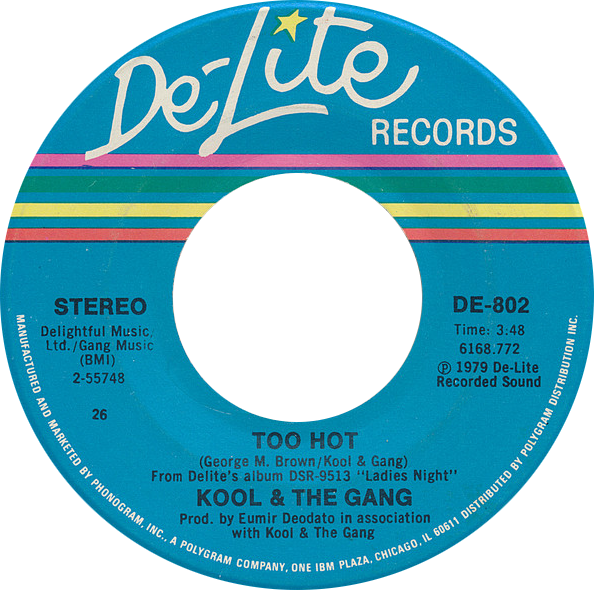
- Side-A label of US single

Single by Kool & the Gang

from the album Ladies' Night
- B-side: "Tonight's the Night"
- Released: January 1980
- Length: 5:05 (album version); 3:48 (single version)
- Label: De-Lite
- Songwriters: George Brown; Kool & the Gang
- Producers: Eumir Deodato; Kool & the Gang

Kool & the Gang singles chronology
"Ladies' Night" (1979)	"Too Hot" (1980)	"Celebration" (1980)

Audio video
- "Too Hot" (album version) on YouTube

"Too Hot" is a song recorded by the American band Kool & the Gang for their first Platinum-selling 1979 album Ladies' Night. It was written by George Brown and Kool & the Gang and produced by Eumir Deodato and Kool & the Gang. The Gold certified single reached number five on the US Billboard Hot 100 and number three on the Billboard R&B survey in early 1980. Record World said that the song "offers a midtempo pace with delightful keyboards & vocals."

== Track listing ==
De-Lite Records - DE-802 - 6168.772:

No.	Title	Writer(s)	Length
1.	"Too Hot"	George M. Brown & Kool and the Gang	3:48
2.	"Tonight's the Night"	Ronald Bell	3:58

== Charts ==
=== Weekly charts ===
Chart (1980)	Peak position
Canada Top Singles (RPM)	18
UK Singles (OCC)	23
US Billboard Hot 100	5
US Dance (Billboard)	5
US Hot Adult Contemporary Tracks (Billboard)	11
US R&B (Billboard)	3
US Cash Box Top 100	7

=== Year-end charts ===
Chart (1980)	Rank
US Billboard Hot 100	36
US Cash Box Top 100	50

== Coolio version ==
"Too Hot"

Single by Coolio

from the album Gangsta's Paradise
- Released: October 31, 1995
- Length: 3:42
- Label: Tommy Boy
- Songwriters: Artis Ivey Jr.; George Brown; Bryan Dobbs
- Producer: Bryan Dobbs

Coolio singles chronology
"Gangsta's Paradise" (1995)	"Too Hot" (1995)	"1, 2, 3, 4 (Sumpin' New)" (1996)

Music video
- "Too Hot" on YouTube

In 1995, American rapper Coolio covered the song for his second studio album, Gangsta's Paradise (1995). It was released in October 1995 by Tommy Boy Records as the second single from the album. Major parts of the original were retained, but supplemented by independent rap passages. In the rap passages he also addresses the issue of the ongoing AIDS crisis. The accompanying music video for "Too Hot" was directed by David Nelson.

=== Critical reception ===
British columnist for Dotmusic, James Masterton viewed the song as "another extremely commercial piece of Gangsta rap and another instant Top 10 hit." He added, "My only query is just who decided to release a record called 'Too Hot' in the middle of a freezing cold January?" Helen Lamont from Smash Hits gave it four out of five, writing, "This is flavour of the fortnight Coolio's remake of an old Kool and the Gang seventies number, and very good it is too. 'Too Hot' is a great dancy tune, along the lines of Godfathers of soul James Brown or James Taylor. You can just see it being played at cool art school discos everywhere, with "individual" types sporting big hats and flares moving to that old skool beat. Groovy, groovy, jazzy, funky, by the way, big man."

=== Charts ===
==== Weekly charts ====
Chart (1995–1996)	Peak position
Australia (ARIA)	42
Belgium (Ultratop 50 Flanders)	41
Belgium (Ultratop 50 Wallonia)	16
Europe (Eurochart Hot 100)	24
Europe (European Hit Radio)	6
Europe (European Dance Radio)	1
France (SNEP)	15
Germany (GfK)	24
Iceland (Íslenski Listinn Topp 40)	9
Ireland (IRMA)	18
Israel (Israeli Singles Chart)	8
Italy (Musica e dischi)	6
Italy Airplay (Music & Media)	6
Netherlands (Dutch Top 40)	12
Netherlands (Single Top 100)	10
New Zealand (Recorded Music NZ)	7
Scottish Singles Sales (Official Charts)	23
Sweden (Sverigetopplistan)	35
Switzerland (Schweizer Hitparade)	18
UK Singles (Official Charts)	9
UK Dance (Official Charts)	16
UK Indie (Music Week)	1
UK Hip Hop/R&B (Official Charts)	1
US Billboard Hot 100	24
US Dance Singles Sales (Billboard)	22
US Hot R&B/Hip-Hop Songs (Billboard)	31
US Hot Rap Songs (Billboard)	6
US Rhythmic Airplay (Billboard)	19
US Cash Box Top 100	23

==== Year-end charts ====
Chart (1996)	Position
Belgium (Ultratop 50 Wallonia)	98
Europe (Eurochart Hot 100)	99
Iceland (Íslenski Listinn Topp 40)	60
US Top 40/Rhythm-Crossover (Billboard)	85

=== Certifications ===
Region	Certification	Certified units/sales
New Zealand (RMNZ)	Gold	5,000^{*}
^{*} Sales figures based on certification alone.

== 2004 version ==
"Too Hot"

Single by Kool & the Gang featuring Lisa Stansfield

from the album The Hits: Reloaded
- Released: September 2004
- Recorded: 2004
- Length: 4:32
- Label: Edel
- Songwriters: George Brown; Kool & the Gang
- Producers: George Brown; Leigh Guest; Khalis Bayyan

Lisa Stansfield singles chronology
"All Around the World (Norty Cotto Mixes)" (2003)	"Too Hot" (2004)	"Easier" (2004)

Audio video
- "Too Hot" on YouTube

In 2004, Kool & the Gang released The Hits: Reloaded album, which features their greatest hits performed by various artists. "Too Hot" was recorded by British singer Lisa Stansfield and released as a promotional single from The Hits: Reloaded in selected European countries in September 2004.

=== Track listings ===
European promotional CD single

1. "Too Hot" (Kool & the Gang featuring Lisa Stansfield) – 4:32
2. "Where Da Boogie At!" (Kool & the Gang featuring R.O.C. & Da Prince Hakim) – 3:39

=== Charts ===
Chart (2004)	Peak position
Hungary (Rádiós Top 40)	36
