= C U When U Get There =

1997 single by Coolio

Single by Coolio featuring 40 Thevz

from the album My Soul and Nothing to Lose: Music from and Inspired by the Motion Picture
- B-side: "Hit 'Em"
- Released: June 17, 1997
- Genre: Hip hop; R&B
- Length: 5:10
- Label: Tommy Boy
- Composer: Johann Pachelbel
- Lyricists: Artis Ivey Jr.; Dominic Aldridge; Henry Straughter; Malieek Straughter
- Producer: Dominic Aldridge

Coolio singles chronology
"The Winner" (1997)	"C U When U Get There" (1997)	"Ooh La La" (1997)

Music video
- "C U When U Get There" on YouTube

"C U When U Get There" is a song by American rapper Coolio featuring 40 Thevz. It was released in June 1997, by Tommy Boy Records, as the first single from Coolio's third studio album, My Soul (1997). The track was also featured on the soundtrack to the 1997 comedy film Nothing to Lose. It heavily interpolates Johann Pachelbel's Baroque "Canon in D Major."

Released on June 17, 1997, the single peaked at number 12 on the US Billboard Hot 100 chart and number seven on the Billboard Hot Rap Tracks chart; it was Coolio's last top-40 hit in the US. It was also an international success, reaching the top 10 in Australia, New Zealand, and several European countries. The accompanying music video was directed by Francis Lawrence. The first live performance of the song was before its actual release during the free concert at Paramount Canada's Wonderland put on by MuchMusic's Electric Circus in August 1997.

== Critical reception ==
Larry Flick from Billboard magazine called "C U When U Get There" an "inspiring hip-hop anthem". He added, "The song's "keep pushin' on" message is direct and delivered in street-savvy language that will connect with its desired youth audience. The strong verses give way to a choir-belted chorus that adds a proper splash of emotional intensity. Factor in the track's easy-paced electro beat and a rush of stately strings, and you have the makings of a massive hit." Scottish newspaper Daily Record described it as a "superb R&B ballad".

A reviewer from Music Week gave it a score of four out of five, noting that "Coolio goes all laid-back on this comforting, torch-like song which comes complete with an uplifting, harmony chorus." The magazine's Alan Jones commented, "Those who thought Coolio's massive hit 'Gangsta's Paradise' was a one-off should think again: his latest single 'C U When U Get There' is an absolute smash. Lifted from the hip-hop heavy soundtrack to the movie Nothing To Lose, it weaves a strong rap into a tapestry that also comprises Pachelbel's 'Canon' and a sweetly singing gospel ensemble. The end result is magic and a substantial hit."

== Track listings ==
- US CD and cassette single, Australian CD single
1. "C U When U Get There" (Coolio's album version) – 5:07
2. "C U When U Get There" (Bill & Humberto's orchestra mix) – 5:25
- US maxi-CD single
1. "C U When U Get There" (Coolio's album version) – 5:07
2. "C U When U Get There" (Ren Swan's mix) – 5:08
3. "C U When U Get There" (Bill & Humberto's orchestra mix) – 5:25
4. "C U When U Get There" (Humberto's alternate mix) – 5:25
5. "Hit 'Em" (album version) – 4:21
- US 12-inch single

A1. "C U When U Get There" (Coolio's album version) – 5:08
A2. "C U When U Get There" (Ren Swan's mix) – 5:07
A3. "C U When U Get There" (Ren Swan's instrumental) – 5:08
B1. "C U When U Get There" (Bill & Humberto's orchestra mix) – 5:25
B2. "Hit 'Em" (album version) – 4:21

- European CD single and UK cassette single
1. "C U When U Get There" (Coolio's radio edit) – 3:40
2. "C U When U Get There" (Ren Swan's radio edit) – 3:57
- UK CD1
1. "C U When U Get There" (Bill & Humberto's orchestra mix) – 5:25
2. "C U When U Get There" (Coolio's album version) – 5:08
3. "C U When U Get There" (Humberto's alternate mix) – 5:25
4. "C U When U Get There" (Ren Swan's mix) – 5:08
- UK CD2
1. "C U When U Get There" (radio edit) – 3:40
2. "Hit 'Em" (album version) – 4:30
3. "The Winner" (remix) – 3:58
4. "All the Way Live (Now)" (Timber mix) – 3:34
- Japanese CD single
1. "C U When U Get There" (Bill & Humberto's orchestra mix without intro)
2. "C U When U Get There" (Bill & Humberto's orchestra mix with intro)
3. "C U When U Get There" (album version)
4. "C U When U Get There" (instrumental)

== Charts ==
=== Weekly charts ===
Chart (1997)	Peak position
Australia (ARIA)	7
Austria (Ö3 Austria Top 40)	4
Belgium (Ultratop 50 Flanders)	9
Belgium (Ultratop 50 Wallonia)	8
Canada (Nielsen SoundScan)	5
Canada Top Singles (RPM)	47
Denmark (IFPI)	4
Europe (Eurochart Hot 100)	3
Finland (Suomen virallinen lista)	8
Germany (GfK)	3
Iceland (Íslenski Listinn Topp 40)	3
Ireland (IRMA)	4
Israel (Israeli Singles Chart)	15
Italy (Musica e dischi)	20
Italy Airplay (Music & Media)	7
Netherlands (Dutch Top 40)	9
Netherlands (Single Top 100)	10
New Zealand (Recorded Music NZ)	4
Norway (VG-lista)	2
Poland Airplay (Music & Media)	5
Scottish Singles Sales (Official Charts)	9
Sweden (Sverigetopplistan)	2
Switzerland (Schweizer Hitparade)	2
UK Singles (Official Charts)	3
UK Indie (Music Week)	1
UK Hip Hop/R&B (Official Charts)	2
US Billboard Hot 100	12
US Dance Singles Sales (Billboard)	11
US Hot R&B/Hip-Hop Songs (Billboard)	34
US Hot Rap Songs (Billboard)	7
US Rhythmic Airplay (Billboard)	19

=== Year-end charts ===
Chart (1997)	Position
Australia (ARIA)	53
Austria (Ö3 Austria Top 40)	40
Belgium (Ultratop 50 Flanders)	53
Belgium (Ultratop 50 Wallonia)	45
Europe (Eurochart Hot 100)	27
Germany (Media Control)	26
Iceland (Íslenski Listinn Topp 40)	29
Netherlands (Dutch Top 40)	37
Netherlands (Single Top 100)	39
New Zealand (RIANZ)	8
Norway (VG-lista)	10
Romania (Romanian Top 100)	16
Sweden (Topplistan)	11
Switzerland (Schweizer Hitparade)	14
UK Singles (OCC)	40
US Billboard Hot 100	66
US Hot Rap Singles (Billboard)	38

== Certifications ==
Region	Certification	Certified units/sales
Australia (ARIA)	Gold	35,000^{^}
Belgium (BRMA)	Gold	25,000^{*}
Germany (BVMI)	Gold	250,000^{^}
New Zealand (RMNZ)	Platinum	10,000^{*}
Sweden (GLF)	Platinum	30,000^{^}
Switzerland (IFPI Switzerland)	Gold	25,000^{^}
United Kingdom (BPI)	Silver	200,000^{^}
United States (RIAA)	Gold	700,000
^{*} Sales figures based on certification alone.^{^} Shipments figures based on certification alone.

== Release history ==
Region	Date	Format(s)	Label(s)	Ref(s).
United States	June 17, 1997	12-inch vinyl; CD; cassette	Tommy Boy	
United Kingdom	July 7, 1997	CD; cassette	Tommy Boy	
Japan	July 16, 1997	CD	Tommy Boy	
