= Coolio's Rules =

2008 American reality TV show

- Genre: Reality
- Country of origin: United States
- Original language: English
- No. of seasons: 1
- No. of episodes: 6

Production
- Producer: Elan Gale
- Running time: 20–22 minutes

Original release
- Network: Oxygen; MuchMore
- Release: October 28 – December 2, 2008

Coolio's Rules was a reality TV show on MuchMore about Coolio and his family produced by Oxygen Studios. Coolio's Rules focuses on Coolio and his family, living in Los Angeles, California. The master rapper tries to balance being a musician, a bachelor looking for love, an entrepreneurial caterer, and a single parent raising four teenagers. The series premiered October 28, 2008, and lasted 6 episodes.

== Coolio's family ==
- Coolio
- Artis Ivey
- Artisha Ivey
- Brandi Ivey
- Jackie Ivey
- Jarez (Jarel Posey)- best friend

== Episode list ==
=== Season 1 ===
The first season of the show began in 2008.

1. My House, My Rules - Coolio's 14-year-old daughter starts dating. Coolio's not happy.
2. Looking for Love - Coolio's signs up to OK Cupid and goes undercover.
3. Cooking with Coolio - Coolio introduces the new love of his life to beans on toast.
4. Def in Venice - Following a nasty bout of tinnitus Coolio visits Venice to try and relax.
5. Pass the Mic. Coolio joins his local am dram society for improv night.
6. Prodigal Son - Coolio's dad comes to visit but will he like the gangsta Martha Stewart's new decor?
