= Coolio.com =

Studio album by Coolio
- Released: April 18, 2001
- Genre: Hip-hop
- Length: 55:12
- Label: JVC Victor
- Producers: Vic C., Devon Davis, Dj Tomekk

Coolio chronology
My Soul (1997)	Coolio.com (2001)	Fantastic Voyage: The Greatest Hits (2001)

Coolio.com is the fourth studio album by American rapper Coolio. The album was released exclusively in Japan on April 18, 2001, on JVC Victor Records. The songs "I Like Girls", "Gangbangers", "Show Me Love", "Would You Still Be Mine", "Skirrrrrrrt" and "Ghetto Square Dance" would later appear on Coolio's 2002 album El Cool Magnifico.

== Track listing ==
No.	Title	Producer(s)	Length
1.	"I Like Girls"	DJ Tomekk	4:57
2.	"Yo-Ho-Ho"	Polar Bear	3:48
3.	"Gangbangers" (featuring Daz Dillinger & Spade)	Brian "Wino" Dobbs	3:42
4.	"Show Me Love"	Dion Davis	4:04
5.	"The Hustler" (featuring Kenny Rogers)	Brian Wino Dobbs	3:33
6.	"Right Now"	Dion Davis	4:01
7.	"The Partay"	Brian Wino Dobbs	3:36
8.	"Dead Man Walking"	Brian "Wino" Dobbs	3:22
9.	"Life"	Lew Laing	3:23
10.	"Would You Still Be Mine"	Vic Conception	3:47
11.	"Skirrrrrrrt" (featuring B-Real)	Vic Conception	4:12
12.	"Neighborhood Square Dance"	Vic Conception	3:40
13.	"These Are the Days"	Suave House	4:07
14.	"Somebody's Gotta Die" (featuring Krayzie Bone) (bonus track)	Derek Jackson, Gilbert Valdez	4:58
