= Eddie (film) =

- Theatrical release poster
- Directed by: Steve Rash
- Screenplay by: Jon Connolly; David Loucka; Eric Champnella; Keith Mitchell; Steve Zacharias; Jeff Buhai
- Story by: Steve Zacharias; Jeff Buhai; Jon Connolly; David Loucka
- Produced by: David Permut; Mark Burg
- Starring: Whoopi Goldberg; Frank Langella; Dennis Farina; Richard Jenkins
- Cinematography: Victor J. Kemper
- Edited by: Richard Halsey
- Music by: Stanley Clarke
- Production companies: Hollywood Pictures; PolyGram Filmed Entertainment; Island Pictures
- Distributed by: Buena Vista Pictures Distribution (North America); PolyGram Filmed Entertainment (international)
- Release date: May 31, 1996 (United States)
- Running time: 100 minutes
- Country: United States
- Language: English
- Budget: $30 million
- Box office: $31.4 million

Eddie is a 1996 American sports comedy film starring Whoopi Goldberg in the title role, Frank Langella, Dennis Farina and Richard Jenkins. The film was directed by Steve Rash.

Eddie was released by Buena Vista Pictures Distribution in the United States on May 31, 1996, with PolyGram Filmed Entertainment releasing in other territories. The film was panned by critics and audiences, but its soundtrack contained two singles: Coolio's "It's All the Way Live (Now)" and Dru Hill's "Tell Me", both of which charted at the Billboard Hot 100.

== Plot ==
The New York Knicks are also-rans in the NBA, their roster filled with players who either lack talent or are too distracted by off-the-court issues. Nonetheless, limousine driver and rabid fan Edwina "Eddie" Franklin attends every Knicks game in the nosebleed section of Madison Square Garden.

During halftime of a game, Eddie is one of three fans picked to win a chance to be the honorary assistant coach of the Knicks for the second half by sinking a free throw, which she does. She quickly gets on the nerves of head coach John Bailey, whom she had heckled earlier.

Eddie is eventually charged with a technical foul for stepping onto the court during an argument between Bailey and a referee, and she is ejected from the Garden, to the fans' dismay. Eddie's popularity piques the interest of the new Knicks owner, "Wild Bill" Burgess. After he forces Bailey to quit, Burgess names Eddie the new head coach.

The decision is received with skepticism and derision. However, she eventually is able to connect with the players both off and on the court to earn their respect. Eddie is able to lead the Knicks into postseason contention; the winner of their game against the Charlotte Hornets, now coached by Bailey, will receive the final spot in the NBA playoffs.

The night before the game, Burgess tells Eddie that if the Knicks win this game, he plans to sell the team to someone who intends to move the team to St. Louis. A conflicted Eddie must decide what to do when the Knicks take a one-point lead with just a few seconds to play. Realizing the consequences, she stops the game to announce Burgess's plan to the crowd at the Garden.

Faced with the possible enormous backlash from the Knicks' fans, Burgess promises the crowd he won't sell the team or move them out of New York City. When play resumes, the Hornets have one last chance to win, but Larry Johnson commits a charge on the game-winning layup, nullifying the basket and giving the Knicks the victory and the playoff berth.

== Cast ==
- Whoopi Goldberg as Edwina "Eddie" Franklin
- Frank Langella as William "Wild Bill" Burgess
- Dennis Farina as Coach John Bailey
- Richard Jenkins as Carl Zimmer
- Lisa Ann Walter as Claudine
- John Benjamin Hickey as Joe Nader
- Troy Beyer as Beth Hastings
- John Salley as Nate Wilson #6
- Rick Fox as Terry Hastings #41
- Malik Sealy as Stacy Patton #20
- Mark Jackson as Darren "Preacher" Taylor #5
- Dwayne Schintzius as Ivan Radovadovitch, #00
- Greg Ostertag as Joe Sparks #25
- Vernel Singleton as Jamal Duncan, #13
- Aasif Mandvi as Mohammed
- Johnny Williams as Big Al
- John DiMaggio as construction worker

Players from several NBA teams played major roles, including Alex English as the Cleveland Cavaliers' coach, Dwayne Schintzius, Greg Ostertag, and Rick Fox. Dennis Rodman, Muggsy Bogues, Vinny Del Negro, Vlade Divac, Bobby Phills, J. R. Reid, Terrell Brandon, Brad Daugherty, Mitch Richmond, Avery Johnson, Corie Blount, Larry Johnson, Randy Brown, Olden Polynice, and Scott Burrell appeared as themselves. Gary Payton, Anthony Mason, Herb Williams, and John Starks appeared as streetballers. Kurt Rambis appeared as the head coach of the Lakers. Marv Albert, Chris Berman, Walt Frazier and Al Trautwig also appeared in the movie as broadcasters.

Donald Trump, Rudy Giuliani, Ed Koch, Fabio, and David Letterman also appeared in the movie. Gene Anthony Ray (who played Leroy in both Fame the series and the 1980 film) also features as associate choreographer, one of his last credits before his death in 2003.

== Reception ==
On Rotten Tomatoes, the film holds an approval rating of 16% based on 37 reviews, with an average rating of 4/10. The website's critics consensus reads: "Whoopi Goldberg may demonstrate that she can coach a basketball team with the best of them, but not even she can whip this dreary script into shape." Audiences polled by CinemaScore gave the film an average grade of "A−" on an A+ to F scale.

Roger Ebert gave the film one and a half stars. Whoopi Goldberg was nominated for a Razzie Award as Worst Actress for her performance.

== Soundtrack ==
A soundtrack containing hip hop and R&B music was released on May 21, 1996, by Island Black Music in conjunction with Hollywood Records. It peaked at 119 on the Billboard 200 and 44 on the Top R&B/Hip-Hop Albums.

== Notes ==
Principal photography commenced on August 9, 1995, and ended on October 12. Co-stars Langella and Goldberg became romantically involved and started divorce proceedings against their respective spouses within two weeks of each other. They lived together until February 2000, when Goldberg asked Langella to move out of her main house and into the guesthouse; on March 7, she asked him to leave the guesthouse, and he did.

== See also ==
- List of basketball films
