= El Cool Magnifico =

Studio album by Coolio
- Released: October 15, 2002
- Length: 61:40
- Label: Riviera Records
- Producer: Coolio; Vic. C Devon Davis; Jamie James

Coolio chronology
Fantastic Voyage (2001)	El Cool Magnifico (2002)	The Return of the Gangsta (2006)

Professional ratings
Review scores
Source	Rating
Allmusic	link

El Cool Magnifico is the fifth studio album by rapper Coolio. The album was released on October 15, 2002, for Riviera Records and was produced by Coolio, Vic. C, Devon Davis and Jamie James. Three singles were released: "I Like Girls", "Ghetto Square Dance" and "Sunshine", but neither the singles nor the album made it to the Billboard charts. Daz Dillinger, B-Real and Ms. Toi make guest appearances. The songs "I Like Girls", "Gangbangers", "Show Me Love", "Would You Still Be Mine", "Skirrrrrrrt" and "Ghetto Square Dance" are originally from Coolio's 2001 album Coolio.com.

== Track listing ==
1. "What Is an MC" 4:00
2. "Shake It Up" 4:11
3. "Cadillac Vogues" 4:02
4. "Show Me Love" 4:02
5. "I Like Girls" 4:54
6. "Ghetto Square Dance" 3:41
7. "Would You Still Be Mine" 3:47
8. "Sunshine" 5:30
9. "Hear Me Now" 4:16
10. "Island Hop" 3:24
11. "Like This" (feat. Ms. Toi) 4:02
12. "Skirrrt" (feat. B-Real) 4:14
13. "Knock Out Kings" Produced By Crimelab Production 3:48
14. "Gangbangers" (feat. Daz Dillinger & Spade) 3:40
15. "Pop Yo Collar" 4:58
