= The Return of the Gangsta =

Studio album by Coolio
- Released: October 16, 2006
- Genre: Hip-hop
- Label: Hardwax Records
- Producer: Coolio (exec.); Black Thompson; Devon Davis; Kenneth Blue; Mac Mozart; Peter Catera; Polarbear; Rob Lowe; Vic; Disco D

Coolio chronology
El Cool Magnifico (2002)	The Return of the Gangsta (2006)	Steal Hear (2008)

Professional ratings
Review scores
Source	Rating
AllMusic	2.5/5 stars
laut.de	3/5 stars

The Return of the Gangsta is the sixth studio album by American rapper Coolio. It was released on October 16, 2006 via Hardwax Records. The single "Gangsta Walk" features Snoop Dogg on guest vocals. Most songs on this album were released again on Coolio's next album Steal Hear, which was released in 2008.

== Track listing ==
No.	Title	Producer(s)	Length
1.	"Intro"		0:43
2.	"Let It Go"	Vic	3:35
3.	"Gangsta Walk" (featuring Snoop Dogg and Gangsta Lu)	Sergio Fertitta; A. Ivey; J. Salinas; C. Broad; R. Jones	3:51
4.	"Do It" (featuring Goast)	Sergio Fertitta	4:19
5.	"Drop Something" (featuring Braza)	Sergio Fertitta; Disco D (voc.)	3:37
6.	"Bloops"		0:30
7.	"Make Money" (featuring Gangsta Lu)	Sergio Fertitta	4:17
8.	"Lady & Gangsta" (featuring K-La)	Sergio Fertitta	4:23
9.	"Daddy's Song" (featuring Artisha)	Devon Davis	4:06
10.	"One More Night" (featuring LV)	Kenneth Blue	4:12
11.	"Loosemobile"		0:34
12.	"Dip It" (featuring Gangsta Lu)	Sergio Fertitta	3:30
13.	"Keep on Dancing"	Peter Cottura	3:48
14.	"187% WRPM"		0:09
15.	"Keep It Gangsta"	Mozart; RobLo	4:12
16.	"They Don't Know" (featuring Black Orchid)	Polarbear	3:55
17.	"West Coast Anthem"	Black Thompson; RobLo	4:41
18.	"Outro"

Japanese exclusive bonus track
No.	Title	Writer(s)	Producer(s)	Length
18.	"Hear Me Now"	Artis Ivey; Josefa Salinas	I-Roc; "Jammin" James Carter	4:14

second disc
No.	Title	Length
1.	"Dip It"
2.	"Dip It (Kroeyer Remix)"
3.	"Dip It (Club Remix)"
4.	"Gangsta Walk - Video"
5.	"Dip It - Video"
6.	"Do It - Video"

== Charts ==
Chart (2006)	Peak position
Swiss Albums (Schweizer Hitparade)	82
