= From the Bottom 2 the Top =

Studio album by Coolio
- Released: July 2, 2009
- Genre: Hip hop
- Length: 45:24
- Label: Subside Records
- Producer: Coolio

Coolio chronology
Steal Hear (2008)	From the Bottom 2 the Top (2009)	Long Live Coolio (2026)

From the Bottom 2 the Top is the eighth studio album by American hip hop recording artist Coolio. It was released on July 2, 2009, by Subside Records. The following songs "Boyfriend", "Cruise Off", "Motivation" were taken from Coolio's previous album Steal Hear, which was released in 2008. It was the last album to be released during his lifetime, as he died on September 28, 2022.

== Track listing ==
No.	Title	Lyrics	Music	Producer(s)	Length
1.	"Change" (Coolio vs Ennio Morricone)	Artis Ivey	Ennio Morricone	Big Fish; Enrico Caruso (co.); DJ Nais (co.)	3:42
2.	"I Will" (featuring 6'9" & Headliner)	Ivey; Blair Bryson; Christopher Harvest	Michael Merrel Simmons	Michael Merrel Simmons	4:17
3.	"From the Bottom 2 the Top" (featuring Goast and A.I.)	Ivey; Bryson; J. Rose	Stefan Roumel	Stefan "Cheech" Roumel	5:08
4.	"Hotel"	Ivey; Bryson	Don Felder; Glenn Frey; Don Henley	Michael Merrel Simmons	5:58
5.	"Lady" (Coolio vs Beat Nouveau featuring Storm Lee)	Ivey	Nile Rodgers; Bernard Edwards; Romain Tranchart; Yann Destagnol	Luca Moretti; Ricky Romanini; Tiziano Lugil	3:26
6.	"Boyfriend" (featuring A.I.)	Ivey	Massimiliano Dagani	Big Fish; Enrico Caruso (co.); DJ Nais (co.)	3:35
7.	"Destinesya" (Coolio vs Yves Larock featuring Sam Obernik)	Ivey; Sam Obernik	Yves Cheminade	Yves Larock	3:16
8.	"Cruis Off"	Ivey	Dagani; Caruso; Luca Porzio	Big Fish; Enrico Caruso (co.); DJ Nais (co.)	4:58
9.	"Motivation" (featuring A.I.)	Ivey	Dagani; Caruso; Porzio	Big Fish; Enrico Caruso (co.); DJ Nais (co.)	4:26
10.	"Stimulate" (featuring Miss Cash)	Ivey	Davide Bassi	Bassi Maestro	3:17
11.	"She Loves Me"	Ivey	Devon Davis	Devon Davis	4:12

== Personnel ==
Adapted from Allmusic.com.

- Bassi Maestro Producer
- Big Fish Producer
- Calvin Broadus Composer, Lyricist
- Yves Cheminade Composer
- Nina Creese Lyricist, Producer
- Cyberpunkers Additional Production, Remixing
- Devon Davis Composer, Producer
- Yann Destagnol Composer
- Dj Nais Producer
- Sergio Fertitta Composer, Producer
- A. Ivey Composer, Lyricist
- Rob low Producer
- Yves Larock Producer
- Loose Composer, Lyricist, Producer
- Tiziano Lugli Producer
- D. McDonald Composer, Producer
- J. Mondhera Producer
- Luca Moretti Producer
- Sam Obernick Lyricist
- Sam Obernik Composer
- N. Rodgers Composer
- Ricky Romanini Producer
- J. Rose Composer, Lyricist
- Stefan "Cheech" Roumel Producer
- J. Salinas Composer, Lyricist
- Michael Merrel Simmons Producer
- Romain Tranchart Composer
