= Gangsta's Paradise (album) =

Studio album by Coolio
- Released: November 7, 1995
- Studios: Echo Sounds, Los Angeles, California and Studio 56, Hollywood, California
- Genres: West Coast hip-hop; gangsta rap; G-funk
- Length: 64:25
- Labels: Tommy Boy; Warner Bros.
- Producers: Coolio; Christopher Hamabe; Deyon Davis; Doug Rasheed; Bryan "The Wino" Dobbs

Coolio chronology
| It Takes a Thief (1994) | Gangsta's Paradise (1995) | My Soul (1997) |

Singles from Gangsta's Paradise
- 1. "Gangsta's Paradise" Released: August 1, 1995; 2. "Too Hot" Released: October 31, 1995; 3. "1, 2, 3, 4 (Sumpin' New)" Released: February 20, 1996

Gangsta's Paradise is the second studio album by American rapper Coolio, released on November 7, 1995. It is Coolio's best-selling album, with over three million copies sold in the United States. The album produced three singles, which became hits: the title track (which was first used in the 1995 film Dangerous Minds, released before Coolio's album), "1, 2, 3, 4 (Sumpin' New)", and "Too Hot".

== Album information ==
Three songs were released as singles. "Gangsta's Paradise" reached number one on the Billboard Hot 100, "1, 2, 3, 4 (Sumpin' New)" reached number 5, and "Too Hot" peaked at number 24.

The album was nominated for a 1997 Grammy for Best Rap Album. The song "Gangsta's Paradise" won a 1996 Grammy Award for Best Rap Solo Performance. "Sumpin' New" was nominated for a 1997 Grammy Award for Best Rap Solo Performance.

== Reception ==
Professional ratings
Review scores
| Source | Rating |
|---|---|
| AllMusic | 4.5/5 stars |
| Cash Box | (favorable) |
| Christgau's Consumer Guide | A− |
| The Encyclopedia of Popular Music | 4/5 stars |
| Entertainment Weekly | B+ |
| Los Angeles Times | 2/4 stars |
| Muzik | 2.5/5 stars |
| NME | 7/10 |
| The Rolling Stone Album Guide | 4/5 stars |
| The Source | 4/5 stars |
| Spin | 8/10 |

Barry Walters of Spin magazine said, "Today's rappers aren't interested in sharing any knowledge with outsiders. Coolio is the great exception... the most stylistically broad mainstream rap album you'll probably hear all year. Even upon first listen, it sounds like a collection of hits."

Entertainment Weekly ranked the album #4 on EW's Top 10 Albums of 1995, and said, "The level-headed street philosopher, preaching respect for black women, fatherly responsibility, and safe sex... continuing in the great tradition of Sly Stone and Stevie Wonder... Coolio and his crew make the ghetto seem not just a place of desolation, but of hope."

The Source magazine's Allen S. Gordon wrote, "The crazy braided one brings skilled and insightful lyrics that reach and relate to all levels of the Black experience... sets standards that corny lyrics and catchy loops can't compete with... Few artists can straddle the line between commercial and underground hip-hop."

Musician said, "Coolio ties his music to a message that's as deep as the groove."

Rap Pages gave the album 7 out of 10, and said, "Maybe because he rapped for a decade with no props, got yanked on record deals... this cool-ass homie from Compton has stayed grounded... Coolio rejoices in the only life he knows."

NME gave the album 7 out of 10, and said, "Instead of playing the role of the Uzi-toting big-shot, he adopts a more reflective view of urban life in Los Angeles... In doing so, Coolio takes a deliberate step forward from last year's light-hearted debut."

== Track listing ==
| # | Title | Producer(s) | Performer(s) | Length |
|---|---|---|---|---|
| 1 | "That's How It Is" | Coolio | Coolio; Talkbox | 1:00 |
| 2 | "Geto Highlites" | Christopher Hamabe; Devon Davis | Coolio; 40 Thevz (backing vocals) | 4:59 |
| 3 | "Gangsta's Paradise" | Doug Rasheed; Danger Jay | Coolio; L.V.; Trinna Simmons (backing) | 4:00 |
| 4 | "Too Hot" | Bryan Wino Dobbs | Coolio; J.T. Taylor | 3:40 |
| 5 | "Cruisin'" | Christopher Hamabe; Devon Davis | Coolio; Malika; Shaunna D. (backing) | 4:34 |
| 6 | "Exercise Yo' Game" | Jay Williams; Maurice Thompson | 40 Thevz; Coolio; E-40; Kam | 4:49 |
| 7 | "1, 2, 3, 4 (Sumpin' New)" | James Carter; Poison Ivey | Coolio | 3:33 |
| 8 | "Smilin'" | Dominic Aldridge; James Carter; Reece Carter (co-producer) | Coolio; Baby G (backing) | 4:07 |
| 9 | "Fucc Coolio" | Coolio | Coolio | 0:50 |
| 10 | "Kinda High Kinda Drunk" | Dominic Aldridge; James Carter; Danny Taylor (co-producer) | Coolio | 3:44 |
| 11 | "For My Sistas" | Oji Pierce | Coolio; Lashann Dendy | 4:26 |
| 12 | "Is This Me?" | Deyon Davis; Deyon Davis Music | Coolio; L.V.; Rated R | 4:23 |
| 13 | "A Thing Goin' On" | Oji Pierce | Coolio; Jeremy Monroe | 4:45 |
| 14 | "Bright as the Sun" | Oji Pierce | Coolio; Will Wheaton | 4:47 |
| 15 | "Recoup This" | Spoon | Coolio; Capucine Jackson (backing); P.S. (backing) | 1:21 |
| 16 | "The Revolution" | Bryan Wino Dobbs | Coolio | 3:48 |
| 17 | "Get Up, Get Down" | Bryan Wino Dobbs | Coolio; Malika; Shorty; Leek Ratt; P.S.; WC; Ras Kass | 5:32 |

== Samples and interpolations ==
- "Geto Highlites" contains a sample of "Groove With You", originally performed by the Isley Brothers. The intro of the song contains interpolations of the lines "What you gonna play now?" from "Make It Funky", originally performed by James Brown, and "Get on up" from "Get Up (I Feel Like Being a) Sex Machine", also originally performed by James Brown.
- "Gangsta's Paradise" contains an interpolation of "Pastime Paradise", originally performed by Stevie Wonder, and the first line of the song is taken from Psalm 23.
- "Too Hot" contains an interpolation of "Too Hot", originally performed by Kool & the Gang.
- "Cruisin'" contains an interpolation of "Cruisin'", originally performed by Smokey Robinson & the Miracles.
- "1, 2, 3, 4 (Sumpin' New)" contains samples of "Thighs High (Grip Your Hips More)", originally performed by Tom Browne, and "Wikka Wrap", originally performed by the Evasions.
- "Smilin'" contains an interpolation of "You Caught Me Smiling", originally performed by Sly & the Family Stone.
- "Kinda High, Kinda Drunk" contains interpolations of "Saturday Night" and "The Boyz in da Hood"
- "For My Sistas" contains an interpolation of "Make Me Say It Again Girl", originally performed by the Isley Brothers.
- "A Thing Goin' On" contains an interpolation of "Me and Mrs. Jones", originally performed by Billy Paul.
- "The Revolution" contains an interpolation of "Magic Night".
- "Get Up, Get Down" contains an interpolation of "Chameleon", originally performed by Herbie Hancock.

== Charts ==
=== Weekly charts ===
| Chart (1995–96) | Peak position |
|---|---|
| Australian Albums (ARIA) | 12 |
| Austrian Albums (Ö3 Austria) | 4 |
| Belgian Albums (Ultratop Flanders) | 28 |
| Belgian Albums (Ultratop Wallonia) | 14 |
| Canada Top Albums/CDs (RPM) | 17 |
| Dutch Albums (Album Top 100) | 9 |
| Finnish Albums (Suomen virallinen lista) | 11 |
| French Albums (SNEP) | 38 |
| German Albums (Offizielle Top 100) | 6 |
| Hungarian Albums (MAHASZ) | 7 |
| New Zealand Albums (RMNZ) | 5 |
| Norwegian Albums (VG-lista) | 24 |
| Swedish Albums (Sverigetopplistan) | 16 |
| Swiss Albums (Schweizer Hitparade) | 2 |
| UK R&B (UK R&B Singles and Albums Charts) | 3 |
| UK Albums (Official Charts) | 18 |
| US Billboard 200 | 9 |
| US Top R&B/Hip-Hop Albums (Billboard) | 14 |

=== Year-end charts ===
| Chart (1996) | Position |
|---|---|
| Austrian Albums (Ö3 Austria) | 41 |
| Dutch Albums (Album Top 100) | 52 |
| German Albums (Offizielle Top 100) | 45 |
| Swiss Albums (Schweizer Hitparade) | 21 |
| US Billboard 200 | 20 |
| US Top R&B/Hip-Hop Albums (Billboard) | 42 |

== Certifications and sales ==
| Region | Certification | Certified units/sales |
|---|---|---|
| Australia (ARIA) | Gold | 35,000^{^} |
| Belgium (BRMA) | Gold | 25,000^{*} |
| Canada (Music Canada) | Platinum | 100,000^{^} |
| France (SNEP) | 2× Gold | 200,000^{*} |
| Germany (BVMI) | Gold | 250,000^{^} |
| Netherlands (NVPI) | Gold | 50,000^{^} |
| New Zealand (RMNZ) | Platinum | 15,000^{^} |
| Sweden (GLF) | Gold | 50,000^{^} |
| Switzerland (IFPI Switzerland) | 2× Platinum | 100,000^{^} |
| United Kingdom (BPI) | Gold | 100,000^{^} |
| United States (RIAA) | 2× Platinum | 2,000,000^{^} |
Summaries
| Worldwide | — | 5,000,000 |
^{*} Sales figures based on certification alone.^{^} Shipments figures based on certification alone.
