= My Soul (Coolio album) =

Studio album by Coolio
- Released: August 26, 1997
- Recorded: 1996–1997
- Genre: Hip-hop
- Length: 58:38
- Label: Tommy Boy; Warner Bros.
- Producer: Bryan "Wino" Dobbs; Vic C.; DJ I-Roc; Mr. Dominique De Romeo; Blue; Oji Pierce; Alene Wilson; Ernest Straughter

Coolio chronology
Gangsta's Paradise (1995)	My Soul (1997)	Coolio.com (2001)

Singles from My Soul
- 1. "C U When U Get There" Released: July 7, 1997; 2. "Ooh La La" Released: September 1997

My Soul is the third studio album by rapper Coolio, released on August 26, 1997, and was his last album for Tommy Boy Records. The album was produced by Romeo, Vic C., Bryan "Wino" Dobbs, and DJ I-Roc.

== Critical reception ==
Professional ratings
Review scores
Source	Rating
AllMusic	4/5 stars
Robert Christgau	2/3 stars
Music Week	4/5 stars
NME	7/10 stars
Smash Hits	2/5 stars
Uncut	3/5 stars

AllMusic's Stephen Thomas Erlewine said that despite lacking a single as memorable as "Gangsta's Paradise", he praised the album for remaining consistent with the formula used from the previous two efforts by providing a more "elaborate production" with lesser known samples and string instrumentations, and Coolio for being steadfast in having both dramedy and ear-grabbing funk in his delivery, concluding that "[I]t's a small, subtle difference, but it's what makes My Soul a thoroughly enjoyable record, no matter if you're going out or staying in." Vibe contributor Malik R. Singleton praised the overall energy throughout the album and Coolio's "didactic delivery" displaying versatility ranging from "intense ("Nature of the Business") to inspirational ("Homeboy") but felt he crafted "too many witless hooks and too much predictable phrasing" on tracks like "Throwdown 2000" and "Let's Do It", concluding that "Despite its blatantly uneven ratio of rump-shaking fluff to heavy-hitting fly rhymes […] My Soul proves why Coolio's presence in hip hop's collective voice remains at least interesting: He's not afraid to have fun."

== Commercial performance ==
Compared to Coolio's previous two albums, My Soul was only a minor success, making it to number 39 on the Billboard 200 and number 49 on the Top R&B/Hip-Hop Albums.

However, the album's only charting single, "C U When U Get There" did well, making it to number 12 on the Billboard Hot 100, number 7 on the Hot Rap Singles, number 19 on the Rhythmic Top 40, and number 11 on the Hot Dance Singles Sales. Internationally, it reached number 3 on the UK Singles Chart, and number 5 on the Canadian Singles Chart.

== Track listing ==
No.	Title	Writer(s)	Producer(s)	Length
1.	"Intro"			0:26
2.	"2 Minutes & 21 Seconds of Funk"	Artis Ivey; Bryan Dobbs	Wino	2:24
3.	"One Mo" (featuring 40 Thevz)	Ivey; Dominic Aldridge; Malieek Straughter; Henry Straughter; James Alexander; Charles Allen; Mike Beard; Mark Bynum; Larry Dodson; Sherman Guy; Harvey Henderson; Allen Jones; Lloyd Smith; Winston Stewart; Frank Thompson; Michael Toles; Chris Frantz; Tina Weymouth; Steven Stanley; Lani Evon	Mr. Dominique De Romeo	3:44
4.	"The Devil is Dope"	Ivey; Dobbs; Anthony Hestor	Wino	4:13
5.	"Hit 'Em" (featuring Ras Kass)	Ivey; John Austin; James Carter; Sherwin Charles; S. Williams; Mark Morales; Darren Robinson; Damon Wimbley	Jammin James Carter; I-Roc	4:21
6.	"Knight Fall"	Ivey; Aldridge	Mr. Dominique De Romeo	4:10
7.	"Ooh La La"	Ivey; Oji Pierce; Grace Jones; Robbie Shakespeare; Lowell Dunbar; Dana Manno; Diane Warren	Oji Pierce	4:05
8.	"Can U Dig It"	Ivey; Victor Concepcion	Vic C.	3:44
9.	"Nature of the Business" (featuring Al Wilson)	Ivey; Alene Wilson; Dale Griffin; Jack Tempchin; Glenn Frey	Alene Wilson; Suede	4:42
10.	"Homeboy" (featuring Montell Jordan)	Ivey; Kenneth Blue	Blue	4:08
11.	"Throwdown 2000" (featuring 40 Thevz)	Ivey; Aldridge; Seth Justman	Mr. Dominique De Romeo; Earnest Straughter (co.); David Straughter (co.)	3:53
12.	"Can I Get Down 1X" (featuring Malika)	Ivey; Dobbs; Marika Bradford; Ray Parker Jr.	Wino; Ray Parker Jr.	3:45
13.	"Interlude"			1:03
14.	"My Soul"	Ivey; Aldridge; Austin; Gino Vanelli	Mr. Dominique De Romeo; Kelvin "K2Dat" Taylor (assoc.)	4:19
15.	"Let's Do It"	Ivey; Aldridge; Harold Clayton; Sigidi	Mr. Dominique De Romeo	4:32
16.	"C U When U Get There" (featuring 40 Thevz)	Ivey; Aldridge; H. Straughter; M. Straughter	Mr. Dominique De Romeo	5:10

Japanese edition bonus track
No.	Title	Length
17.	"It's All the Way Live"

== Samples ==
- "2 Minutes & 21 Seconds of Funk"
  - "The Payback" by James Brown
- "C U When U Get There"
  - "Canon in D Major" by Johann Pachelbel
- "Homeboy"
  - "Tonight Is the Night" by Betty Wright
  - "Friends" by Whodini
- "Can I Get Down One Time"
  - "For Those Who Like to Groove" by Ray Parker Jr.
- "Hit 'Em"
  - "Human Beat Box" by the Fat Boys
- "Let's Do It"
  - "Take Your Time (Do It Right)" by the S.O.S. Band
- "Ooh La La"
  - "Pull Up to the Bumper" by Grace Jones
- "The Devil Is Dope"
  - "The Devil Is Dope" by the Dramatics
- "One Mo"
  - "She Talks to Me With Her Body" by Bar-Kays
  - "Rapper's Delight" by Sugarhill Gang
- "Knight Fall"
  - "Hook and Sling - Part I" by Eddie Bo
  - "Public Enemy No. 1" by Public Enemy

== Charts ==
Chart performance for My Soul
Chart (1997)	Peak position
Austrian Albums (Ö3 Austria)	19
Belgian Albums (Ultratop Flanders)	19
Belgian Albums (Ultratop Wallonia)	49
Dutch Albums (Album Top 100)	12
Finnish Albums (Suomen virallinen lista)	25
Hungarian Albums (MAHASZ)	28
German Albums (Offizielle Top 100)	19
New Zealand Albums (RMNZ)	20
Norwegian Albums (VG-lista)	27
Scottish Albums (OCC)	57
Swedish Albums (Sverigetopplistan)	30
Swiss Albums (Schweizer Hitparade)	16
UK Albums (OCC)	28
UK Independent Albums (OCC)	16
UK R&B Albums (OCC)	6
US Billboard 200	39
US Top R&B/Hip-Hop Albums (Billboard)	49

== Certifications ==
Region	Certification	Certified units/sales
Canada (Music Canada)	Gold	50,000^{^}
Japan (RIAJ)	Gold	100,000^{^}
United States (RIAA)	Gold	500,000^{^}
^{^} Shipments figures based on certification alone.
