= Fantastic Voyage (Coolio song) =

1994 single by Coolio

Single by Coolio

from the album It Takes a Thief
- Released: March 1994
- Genre: G-funk
- Length: 5:32 (main version); 4:08 (radio version)
- Label: Tommy Boy
- Songwriters: Norman Beavers; Marvin Craig; Bryan Wino Dobbs; Artis Ivey Jr.; Fred Alexander Jr.; Mark Adam Wood Jr.; Tiemeyer McCain; Thomas Oliver Shelby; Stephen Shockley; Otis Stokes
- Producer: Bryan Wino Dobbs

Coolio singles chronology
"I Remember" (1994)	"Fantastic Voyage" (1994)	"Mama I'm in Love Wit a Gangsta" (1994)

Music video
- "Fantastic Voyage" on YouTube

"Fantastic Voyage" is a song by American rapper Coolio, released in March 1994 by Tommy Boy Records as the third single from his debut album, It Takes a Thief (1994). The song was produced by Bryan "Wino" Dobbs and was later also featured on the 2001 compilation album Fantastic Voyage: The Greatest Hits. It heavily samples the 1980 song of the same name by Lakeside, and peaked at number 12 on the US Billboard Hot R&B Singles chart, number two on the Billboard Hot Rap Singles chart and number three on the Billboard Hot 100. It sold one million copies domestically and received a platinum certification from the Recording Industry Association of America (RIAA). The accompanying music video was directed by F. Gary Gray, featuring a cameo of B-Real of Cypress Hill.

== Content ==
According to AllMusic's Jason Lymangrover, "With its infectious 'Slide, slide, slippity slide' chorus, it went unnoticed that his breakthrough single, 'Fantastic Voyage,' was actually a song about escapism."

Here, as in the artist's "Gangsta's Paradise", Coolio laments the realities of urban black poverty. He writes "Tryin' to find a place... where my kids can play outside without livin' in fear of a drive by."

== Critical reception ==
Larry Flick from Billboard magazine wrote, "Disco-era funk classic is the juice for a raucous, hand-clappin' rap throwdown. Coolio darts in and around the rugged baseline with aplomb, alternately using his voice as a percussive instrument and as a source of wordage. Hot party record seems assured of a bright sales and radio future." Dr. Bayyan from Cash Box commented, "Phat, thumpin' bass, funky groove and Coolio's voice tellin' the story of gangin', slingin' and killin'. This song makes successful use of the old Lakeside hit of the same name. Unlike many artists, Coolio hasn't jumped on the jazz tip. He's just as funky as can be, especially on the Timber Mix and the QDIII Mix."

Simon Price from Melody Maker named it a song "you should already know" and "a 'One Nation Under a Groove' for the Nineties". Brad Beatnik from the Record Mirror Dance Update praised it as "a smart, funky and bold party jam from Coolio and his DJ Wino" and "a possible in-car summer anthem." Another RM editor, James Hamilton, described it as "Lakeside-ishly chorused chanting strong P'funky rap" in his weekly dance column. Charles Aaron from Spin ranked "Fantastic Voyage" number three in his list of the "Top 20 Singles of the Year", writing, "Sociohistorical groove and hair. This man obviously should have his own television show."

== Music video ==
The music video for "Fantastic Voyage" was directed by American director and producer F. Gary Gray and filmed in Los Angeles. Daniel Pearl directed photography and Craig Fannig executive-produced the video. It premiered in May 1994 and won two awards at the 1994 Billboard Music Video Awards; for Clip of the Year and New Artist Clip of the Year, both in the category for Rap. The video was also nominated for Maximum Impact Clip of the Year. At the 1995 Soul Train Music Awards, "Fantastic Voyage" also received an nomination in the category for R&B/soul music video.

=== Synopsis ===
It features Coolio napping on his front porch, when he gets a phone call from his friend Spoon that wakes him. Spoon asks about taking a trip to the beach, to which an annoyed Coolio responds "we ain't got no car" and hangs up on him. Suddenly a mysterious magician man with a '70s style suit, afro, and cane appears and turns the blue bicycle sitting upside down on Coolio's driveway into a blue 1965 Chevrolet Impala convertible car with hydraulics. Now with a means of transportation, Coolio and his crew head to the beach, while picking up people along the way by letting them ride inside the car's trunk. The rest of the video features Coolio at the beach helping the crowd of passengers out of the trunk of the car for a beach party, which includes people of all races and a mariachi band. B-Real of Cypress Hill has a cameo. At the end of the video, the car is transformed back into a bicycle on Coolio's driveway and Coolio is woken up again by a phone call from Spoon, showing that the trip was all just a dream. Coolio reminds him that they have no car, telling him to quit calling, and hangs up. Then Coolio looks at the bike to see the dream car's blue custom California license plate saying "FNTX VYG", based on the song's name, is hanging off the bike's front wheel hub. This leaves him wondering if the events were really a dream and dresses the stage for the video "I Remember."

=== Cast and credits ===
- Coolio and guest stars
- Directed by: F. Gary Gray
- Cinematographer: Daniel Pearl
- Produced by: Craig Fanning
- Production Manager: Tina Lucarelli and Jack Sawyers
- First assistant director: Greg Webb
- Production coordinators: Frank Bruno, Tina Lucarelli
- Premiere: May 1994, 10:00 a.m.

== Charts ==
=== Weekly charts ===
Weekly chart performance for "Fantastic Voyage"
Chart (1994)	Peak position
Australia (ARIA)	37
Canada Retail Singles (The Record)	16
Europe (European Dance Radio)	9
Germany (GfK)	91
Iceland (Íslenski Listinn Topp 40)	40
Netherlands (Dutch Top 40)	31
Netherlands (Single Top 100)	31
New Zealand (Recorded Music NZ)	8
Sweden (Sverigetopplistan)	29
UK Singles (Official Charts)	41
UK Dance (Official Charts)	13
UK Dance (Music Week)	13
UK Club Chart (Music Week)	62
US Billboard Hot 100	3
US Dance Singles Sales (Billboard)	4
US Hot R&B/Hip-Hop Songs (Billboard)	12
US Hot Rap Songs (Billboard)	2
US Pop Airplay (Billboard)	28
US Rhythmic Airplay (Billboard)	2
US Cash Box Top 100	10

=== Year-end charts ===
Year-end chart performance for "Fantastic Voyage"
Chart (1994)	Position
Brazil (Mais Tocadas)	69
New Zealand (RIANZ)	36
US Billboard Hot 100	20
US Hot R&B Singles (Billboard)	63
US Hot Rap Singles (Billboard)	10
US Maxi-Singles Sales (Billboard)	18
US Cash Box Top 100	44

== Certifications ==
Certifications and sales for "Fantastic Voyage"
Region	Certification	Certified units/sales
United States (RIAA)	Platinum	1,000,000

== Release history ==
Release dates and formats for "Fantastic Voyage"
Region	Date	Format(s)	Label(s)	Ref.
United States	March 1994	7-inch vinyl; 12-inch vinyl; CD; cassette	Tommy Boy	
Australia	July 11, 1994	CD; cassette	Liberation; Tommy Boy	
United Kingdom	July 11, 1994	12-inch vinyl; CD; cassette	Tommy Boy	

== In popular culture ==
- The song was used in the Everybody Loves Raymond season 3 episode "Robert's Date."
- In 2018, Chrysler released a music video featuring Coolio called "Vantastic Voyage" to promote the Chrysler Pacifica minivan.
- In 2022, the song was featured in a commercial for Airbnb promoting their Amazing Pools category.
- In 2026, the song was featured in a trailer for The Cat in the Hat.
