= Gangsta Walk =

2006 single by Coolio

Single by Coolio featuring Snoop Dogg

from the album The Return of the Gangsta
- Released: August 8, 2006
- Recorded: 2005
- Genre: Gangsta rap; G-funk; West Coast hip hop
- Length: 3:51
- Label: Subside Records (Italy); Edel (Germany)
- Songwriters: Sergio Fertitta; A. Ivey; J. Salinas; C. Broad; R. Jones
- Producer: DJ Battlecat

Coolio singles chronology
"I Don't Wanna Die" (2002)	"Gangsta Walk" (2006)	"Dip It" (2007)

Snoop Dogg singles chronology
"Go to Church" (2006)	"Gangsta Walk" (2006)	"Vato" (2006)

"Gangsta Walk" is a song by American rapper Coolio, released in August 2006 as the lead single from his sixth studio album The Return of the Gangsta. The song features American rapper Snoop Dogg and uncredited vocals by rapper Gangsta Lu. It was premiered in a ceremony in Milan dedicated to the Italian debut of Coolio.

== Music video ==
The music video is a futuristic studio and 3D graphic-designed piece directed by Marco Gentile. It was filmed in Los Angeles in January 2006. It features Snoop Dogg dressed in black in a white control room surrounded by women wearing white uniforms. Coolio can be seen in a parking basement with Hummer Transformer.

== Remixes ==
1. "Gangsta Walk" (Pastaboys Main Mix) – 5:49
2. "Gangsta Walk" (DJ Remo Radio Mix) – 3:59
3. "Gangsta Walk" (DJ Remo Vocal Walk Mix) – 5:49

== Charts ==
Chart performance for "Gangsta Walk"
Chart (2006)	Peak position
Australia (ARIA)	67
Australian Urban (ARIA)	17
Austria (Ö3 Austria Top 40)	75
CIS Airplay (TopHit)	153
Switzerland (Schweizer Hitparade)	56
UK Singles (OCC)	67
