= It Takes a Thief (album) =

Studio album by Coolio
- Released: July 19, 1994
- Genres: West Coast hip-hop; gangsta rap; G-funk
- Length: 59:14
- Label: Tommy Boy
- Producers: Paul Stewart, Bryan Wino Dobbs, Rashad Coles(Coes), Billy Boy, Crazy Toones, CS Coleman

Coolio chronology
It Takes a Thief (1994)	Gangsta's Paradise (1995)

Singles from It Takes a Thief
- 1. "County Line" Released: October 5, 1993; 2. "I Remember" Released: 1994; 3. "Fantastic Voyage" Released: March 1994; 4. "Mama, I'm in Love with a Gangsta" Released: 1994

It Takes a Thief is the debut studio album by American rapper Coolio. It was released on July 19, 1994, on Warner Bros. Records. The album received praise for bringing a humorous and lighthearted perspective to the often violent and profane themes of typical gangsta rap.

"Fantastic Voyage," a hit from the early 1980s, returned to the charts after Coolio released a song of the same name from this album. The song received regular airplay on MTV and became his breakout hit, peaking at No. 3 in the US. Songs "Smokin Stix," "Can-o-Corn," and "Sticky Fingers" first appeared in the film Poetic Justice.

== Critical reception ==
Professional ratings
Review scores
Source	Rating
AllMusic	4/5 stars
Robert Christgau	(3-star Honorable Mention)
Entertainment Weekly	B+
Los Angeles Times	3.5/4 stars
NME	8/10
Rolling Stone	4/5 stars
Select	4/5 medals

The Los Angeles Times concluded that It Takes a Thief "may be one of the best hard-core Compton rap records since the first N.W.A. album." USA Today wrote that the album "mixes hard-core themes with tongue-in-cheek attitude and funky, unflinching rhythms."

== Track listing ==
All tracks are written by Artis Ivey, unless otherwise noted.

No.	Title	Writer(s)	Length
1.	"Fantastic Voyage"	Artis Ivey; Bryan Wino Dobbs; Fred Alexander; Norman Beavers; Marvin Craig; Tiemeyer McCain; Thomas Shelby; Stephen Shockley; Otis Stokes; Mark Adam Woods	4:03
2.	"County Line"	Artis Ivey; Bryan Wino Dobbs; Allen Jones; Charles Allen; Clifton Chase; Ed Fletcher; Frank Thompson; Harvey Henderson; James Alexander; Larry Dodson; Lloyd Smith; Mark Bynum; Melvin Glover; Michael Beard; Sherman Guy; Sylvia Robinson; Winston Stewart	2:57
3.	"Mama, I'm in Love wit a Gangsta" (featuring LeShaun)	Artis Ivey; Chris Jasper; Ernie Isley; Marvin Isley; O'Kelly Isley Jr.; Ronald Isley; Rudolph Isley; Roy Ayers	4:09
4.	"Hand on My Nutsac"		3:28
5.	"Ghetto Cartoon"	Artis Ivey; Autry DeWalt; Freddie Perren; Willie Woods	3:13
6.	"Smokin' Stix"	Artis Ivey; Allan Felder; Talmadge Conway	3:20
7.	"Can-o-Corn"		3:40
8.	"U Know Hoo!" (featuring WC)	Artis Ivey; William Calhoun	3:51
9.	"It Takes a Thief"		5:06
10.	"Bring Back Somethin' fo da Hood"	Artis Ivey; Ralph MacDonald	3:11
11.	"N da Closet"	Artis Ivey; Frank Wilson; James Nyx Jr.; Kathy Wakefield; Marvin Gaye	3:51
12.	"On My Way to Harlem"		3:13
13.	"Sticky Fingers"	Artis Ivey; Bryan Wino Dobbs; Clifton "Jiggs" Chase; Ed Fletcher; Melvin Glover; Sylvia Robinson	2:59
14.	"Thought You Knew"		3:19
15.	"Ugly Bitches"	Artis Ivey; Ken Gold; Michael Denne	4:06
16.	"I Remember" (featuring J-Ro and Billy Boy)	Artis Ivey; Al Green; Kenneth Gamble; Leon Huff; Willie Mitchell	4:47

== Charts ==
=== Weekly charts ===
Chart (1994)	Peak position
US Billboard 200	8
US Top R&B/Hip-Hop Albums (Billboard)	5

=== Year-end charts ===
Chart (1994)	Position
US Top R&B/Hip-Hop Albums (Billboard)	80

== Certifications ==
Region	Certification	Certified units/sales
Canada (Music Canada)	Gold	50,000^{^}
United States (RIAA)	Platinum	1,000,000^{^}
^{^} Shipments figures based on certification alone.
