= 1, 2, 3, 4 (Sumpin' New) =

1996 single by Coolio

Single by Coolio

from the album Gangsta's Paradise
- B-side: "Smilin'"; "Kinda High, Kinda Drunk"
- Released: February 13, 1996
- Genre: Funk; hip hop; disco
- Length: 3:20
- Label: Tommy Boy
- Songwriters: Artis Ivey Jr.; Adrian Sear; Tom Browne
- Producers: Jammin James Carter; Poison Ivey

Coolio singles chronology
"Too Hot" (1995)	"1, 2, 3, 4 (Sumpin' New)" (1996)	"Payback" (1996)

Music video
- "1, 2, 3, 4 (Sumpin' New)" on YouTube

"1, 2, 3, 4 (Sumpin' New)" is a song by American rapper Coolio. It was the third single released from his second studio album, Gangsta's Paradise (1995), in February 1996 by Tommy Boy Entertainment. Initially entitled "Sumpin' New", the song uses a sample from "Thighs High (Grip Your Hips and Move)", recorded in 1981 by American jazz trumpeter Tom Browne, and also includes a vocal sample from "Wikka Wrap" by the Evasions, from 1981. The song achieved success in several countries, including the United States, Estonia, France, Iceland, and New Zealand, where it was a top-10 hit.

== Critical reception ==
Larry Flick from Billboard magazine described the song as "a jumpy, funk-lined jeep anthem that allows Coolio plenty of room to work up a fun, lyrical sweat." He added, "The sample-happy groove provides a wigglin' good time, riding primarily on a prominent snippet of the early '80s 12-incher 'Wikka Wrap' by the Evasions. Lighter in content than Coolio's recent releases, this is a hit-bound jam that will leave you gleefully twitching and grinning from ear to ear." Gil L. Robertson IV from Cash Box named "1, 2, 3, 4 (Sumpin' New)" a standout track of the Gangsta's Paradise album.

Ralph Tee from Music Week's RM Dance Update gave the song a score of four out of five. He remarked, "Unlike so many hip hop singles which lean towards often depressing issues, this is a spirited happy record about having a great party. It kicks off with a sample from The Evasions' 1981 novelty hit 'Wikka Wrap', the Alan Whicker impersonation leading towards an upbeat disco rap which utilises the much-used Chic bassline from 'Good Times' and some sampled Tom Browne horns. A strong third single from the hottest rapper in the biz right now." Another RM editor, James Hamilton described it as an "ultra infectious jiggly rap smacker".

== Music video ==
A music video (directed by David Dobkin) for the Timber mix was released, featuring Coolio attempting to get to a party. Jamie Foxx and A. J. Johnson are also in the music video. A music video featuring the Muppets was released and premiered on the Disney Channel. This music video was also used as the closing number on the Muppets Tonight episode which guest-starred Coolio. The video won the MTV Video Music Award for Best Dance Video.

== Track listings ==
- US 7-inch and cassette single, UK cassette single
1. "1, 2, 3, 4 (Sumpin' New)" (Timber mix clean version) – 3:20
2. "1, 2, 3, 4 (Sumpin' New)" (clean album version) – 3:20
- US, UK, and European CD single
1. "1, 2, 3, 4 (Sumpin' New)" (Timber mix) – 3:20
2. "Smilin'" – 4:09
- US 12-inch single

A1. "1, 2, 3, 4 (Sumpin' New)" (Timber mix extended version)
A2. "1, 2, 3, 4 (Sumpin' New)" (Timber mix instrumental)
A3. "1, 2, 3, 4 (Sumpin' New)" (Timber mix a cappella)
B1. "1, 2, 3, 4 (Sumpin' New)" (album version)
B2. "Kinda High, Kinda Drunk" (album version)

- UK 12-inch single

A1. "1, 2, 3, 4 (Sumpin' New)" (Timber mix extended version)
A2. "1, 2, 3, 4 (Sumpin' New)" (Timber mix instrumental)
B1. "1, 2, 3, 4 (Sumpin' New)" (album version)
B2. "Kinda High, Kinda Drunk" (album version)

- German CD single
1. "1, 2, 3, 4 (Sumpin' New)" (Timber mix clean version) – 3:20
2. "1, 2, 3, 4 (Sumpin' New)" (Timber mix extended version) – 4:33
3. "1, 2, 3, 4 (Sumpin' New)" (Timber mix straight pass) – 3:31
4. "Kinda High, Kinda Drunk" – 3:44
- Australian CD and cassette single
1. "1, 2, 3, 4 (Sumpin' New)" (Timber mix)
2. "1, 2, 3, 4 (Sumpin' New)" (clean album version)
3. "1, 2, 3, 4 (Sumpin' New)" (Timber mix extended version)
4. "1, 2, 3, 4 (Sumpin' New)" (Timber mix instrumental)
5. "1, 2, 3, 4 (Sumpin' New)" (a cappella)
6. "1, 2, 3, 4 (Sumpin' New)" (album version)
7. "1, 2, 3, 4 (Sumpin' New)" (Timber mix straight pass)
8. "Smilin'"
- Japanese CD single
1. "1, 2, 3, 4 (Sumpin' New)" (Timber mix)
2. "Smilin'"
3. "1, 2, 3, 4 (Sumpin' New)" (Timber mix instrumental)

== Charts ==
=== Weekly charts ===
Chart (1996)	Peak position
Australia (ARIA)	12
Belgium (Ultratop 50 Flanders)	49
Belgium (Ultratop 50 Wallonia)	39
Canada Dance/Urban (RPM)	10
Estonia (Eesti Top 20)	6
Europe (Eurochart Hot 100)	28
Europe (European Dance Radio)	3
France (SNEP)	7
Germany (GfK)	39
Iceland (Íslenski Listinn Topp 40)	2
Ireland (IRMA)	29
Israel (Israeli Singles Chart)	19
Italy (Musica e dischi)	11
Italy Airplay (Music & Media)	2
Netherlands (Dutch Top 40)	18
Netherlands (Single Top 100)	14
New Zealand (Recorded Music NZ)	2
Norway (VG-lista)	14
Scottish Singles Sales (Official Charts)	25
Sweden (Sverigetopplistan)	17
Sweden (Swedish Dance Chart)	3
UK Singles (Official Charts)	13
UK Hip Hop/R&B (Official Charts)	3
US Billboard Hot 100	5
US Dance Singles Sales (Billboard)	9
US Hot R&B/Hip-Hop Songs (Billboard)	24
US Hot Rap Songs (Billboard)	26
US Pop Airplay (Billboard)	28
US Rhythmic Airplay (Billboard)	3
US Cash Box Top 100	4

=== Year-end charts ===
Chart (1996)	Position
Australia (ARIA)	29
France (SNEP)	39
Iceland (Íslenski Listinn Topp 40)	29
Sweden (Swedish Dance Chart)	19
US Billboard Hot 100	40
US Hot R&B Singles (Billboard)	100
US Hot Rap Singles (Billboard)	22
US Top 40/Mainstream (Billboard)	79
US Top 40/Rhythm-Crossover (Billboard)	22

== Certifications ==
Region	Certification	Certified units/sales
Australia (ARIA)	Gold	35,000^{^}
France (SNEP)	Gold	250,000^{*}
New Zealand (RMNZ)	Gold	5,000^{*}
United States (RIAA)	Gold	700,000
^{*} Sales figures based on certification alone.^{^} Shipments figures based on certification alone.

== Release history ==
Region	Date	Format(s)	Label(s)	Ref.
United States	February 13, 1996	Rhythmic contemporary radio	Tommy Boy	
United Kingdom	March 25, 1996	12-inch vinyl; CD; cassette	Tommy Boy	
Japan	April 21, 1996	CD	Tommy Boy	
