= Coolio =

American rapper (1963–2022)

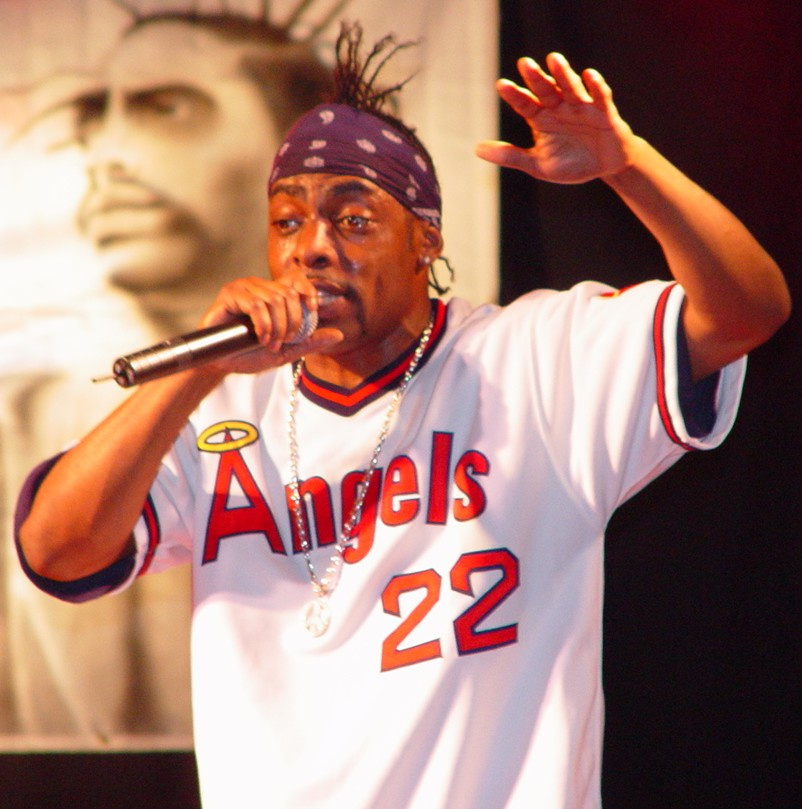
- Coolio in 2002

Background information
- Born: Artis Leon Ivey Jr. August 1, 1963; Monessen, Pennsylvania, U.S.
- Origin: Compton, California, U.S.
- Died: September 28, 2022 (aged 59) Los Angeles, California, U.S.
- Genres: West Coast hip-hop; gangsta rap
- Occupations: Rapper; songwriter; record producer; actor
- Instrument: Vocals
- Years active: 1987–2022
- Labels: Tommy Boy; Warner Bros.; Allied Artists
- Formerly of: WC and the Maad Circle

Artis Leon Ivey Jr. (August 1, 1963 – September 28, 2022), known by his stage name Coolio, was an American rapper, songwriter and record producer. He was best known for his single "Gangsta's Paradise" (1995), which won a Grammy Award, and was credited for changing the course of hip-hop by bringing it to a wider audience. Other singles included "Fantastic Voyage" (1994), "1, 2, 3, 4 (Sumpin' New)" (1996), and "C U When U Get There" (1997). He released nine albums, the first three of which achieved mainstream success: It Takes a Thief (1994), Gangsta's Paradise (1995), and My Soul (1997). Coolio first achieved recognition as a member of the gangsta rap group WC and the Maad Circle. Coolio sold 4.8 million albums in the U.S.

He also created the six-episode reality television show Coolio's Rules (2008), the web series Cookin' with Coolio, and published a cookbook.

== Early life ==
Artis Leon Ivey Jr. was born on August 1, 1963, in Monessen, Pennsylvania. His mother was a factory worker who divorced his father, who was a carpenter, and they moved to Compton, California, when Ivey was eight years old. Ivey was severely asthmatic and, as a child, he was taken to the hospital several times due to asthma complications. He was a regular visitor to his local library as a boy. He often played board games with his mother. He started rapping as a teenager, earning the nickname Coolio Iglesias due to his slick performances, a takeoff of Spanish singer Julio Iglesias; the nickname was later shortened to Coolio. He was arrested for taking a weapon to school and served prison time for larceny. As Compton went into decline in the 1980s, he became addicted to crack cocaine, but quit drugs after spending time living with his father in San Jose, crediting Christianity for helping him get over his addiction. There, he worked for the California Department of Forestry and Fire Protection. Coolio attended Compton Community College then worked in a volunteer fire department and security at Los Angeles International Airport, before becoming a rapper.

== Music career ==
Coolio recorded his first single in 1987, titled "Whatcha Gonna Do?" In 1988, he recorded "What Makes You Dance (Force Groove)" with Nu-Skool. Coolio made connections in the L.A. rap scene, and in 1991, joined the group WC and the Maad Circle, led by rapper WC. He is a credited co-contributor on the group's debut album Ain't a Damn Thang Changed, including on the single "Dress Code".

=== Tommy Boy Records and It Takes a Thief ===
In 1994, Coolio signed a recording contract with Tommy Boy Records and released his debut solo album It Takes a Thief. The lead single "Fantastic Voyage" received heavy rotation on MTV and peaked at No. 3 on the Billboard Hot 100, becoming one of the biggest rap singles of the year. Other minor hits from the album include "County Line" and "I Remember". It Takes a Thief peaked at No. 8 on the Billboard 200, becoming certified Platinum. The album received praise for bringing a humorous and lighthearted perspective to the often violent and profane themes of typical gangsta rap.

=== Gangsta's Paradise ===
In 1995, for the film Dangerous Minds, Coolio released the single, "Gangsta's Paradise", featuring R&B singer L.V.. It became one of the most successful rap songs of all time, topping the Billboard Hot 100 for three weeks. It was the No. 1 single of 1995 in the United States for all genres and was a global hit topping the United Kingdom, Ireland, France, Germany, Italy, Sweden, Austria, Netherlands, Norway, Switzerland, Australia, and New Zealand charts. "Gangsta's Paradise" was the second-best-selling single of 1995 in the U.K. The song also created a controversy when Coolio claimed that comedy musician "Weird Al" Yankovic had not asked for permission to make his parody of "Gangsta's Paradise", titled "Amish Paradise". At the 1996 Grammy Awards, the song won Coolio a Grammy Award for Best Rap Solo Performance.

Originally "Gangsta's Paradise" was not meant to be included in one of Coolio's studio albums, but due to its success, Coolio included it on the album, making it the title track. It interpolates the chorus and music of the song "Pastime Paradise" by Stevie Wonder, which was recorded nearly 20 years earlier on Wonder's album Songs in the Key of Life. The album Gangsta's Paradise was released in 1995 and was certified two-times platinum by the RIAA, selling more than two million copies in the US alone.

The album contains two other major hits in "1, 2, 3, 4 (Sumpin' New)" and "Too Hot" with J. T. Taylor of Kool & the Gang doing the chorus. Despite no longer being an official member of the group, Coolio appears on the second WC and the Maad Circle album Curb Servin' on the song "In a Twist". In 1996, Coolio had another top 40 hit with the song "It's All the Way Live (Now)" from the soundtrack to the movie Eddie. He is also featured on the song "Hit 'em High" from the soundtrack to the 1996 film Space Jam with B-Real, Method Man, LL Cool J, and Busta Rhymes.

In 2014, the band Falling in Reverse did a cover of "Gangsta's Paradise" for Punk Goes 90s Vol. 2, with Coolio making a cameo in the music video.

=== Red Hot Organization and Tommy Boy Records dismissal ===
In 1996, Coolio appeared on the Red Hot Organization's compilation CD America Is Dying Slowly, alongside Biz Markie, Wu-Tang Clan, and Fat Joe, among many other prominent hip-hop artists. The CD meant to raise awareness of the AIDS epidemic among African-American men. That same year, he recorded the music video "Aw, Here It Goes!" for the opening sequence of the Nickelodeon television series Kenan & Kel, which ran for four seasons.

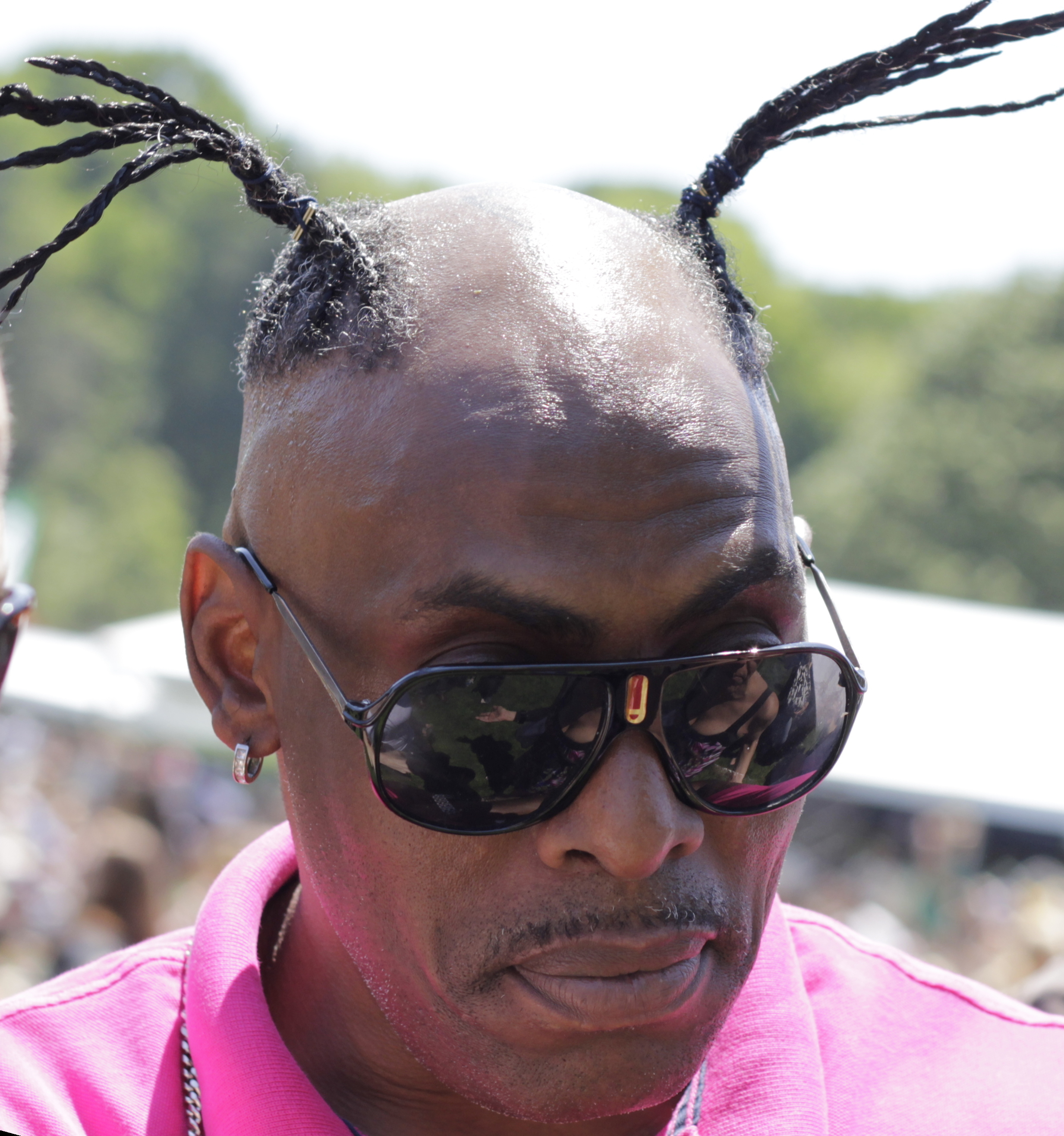
Coolio in 2012

Coolio's third solo album, My Soul, came out in 1997. Although it contains the major hit "C U When U Get There" and the album went gold, it failed to reach the success of his previous two albums. Coolio was subsequently dropped from the Tommy Boy Records label. Since then, 2001's Coolio.com, 2003's El Cool Magnifico, 2006's The Return of the Gangsta, and 2008's Steal Hear, 2009's From the Bottom 2 the Top, and 2017's Long Live the Thief have not charted on any Billboard chart. He did have a minor hit in the UK in 2006 with "Gangsta Walk" (featuring Snoop Dogg).

While touring with hip-hop duo Insane Clown Posse, Coolio received a tattoo as a homage to the group's fanbase, reading "Jugalo Cool" [sic]. He stated that the misspelling was intentional. Coolio performed at the Gathering of the Juggalos.

Coolio is featured on an international collaboration track called "Fuck the DJ" by UK rapper Blacklisted MC, also featuring Bizarre of D12, Adil Omar (from Pakistan), and Uzimon (from Bermuda). The song premiered on music website Noisey from Vice in October 2014.

=== Television appearances ===
In 1996, Coolio made a guest appearance as himself on Sabrina, the Teenage Witch.

In 1997, Coolio voiced himself in the season four episode of the animated series Duckman: Private Dick/Family Man titled "Coolio Runnings". Additionally, Coolio performs his song "Geto Highlites" at the end of the episode.

Coolio appeared in a season five, 1998 episode of The Nanny, "Homie-Work", in which he portrays the nerdy Erwin, a "gift wrapper", and is transformed by the nanny into a "rapper" for Maxwell Sheffield's new rap musical. He additionally played himself in season six's "Making Whoopi".

In 2002, Coolio appeared as himself in an episode of Blind Date. Coolio appeared in the 15th episode of the fourth season of Charmed, which aired March 14, 2002. He plays the role of a Lazarus Demon.

In 2004, Coolio appeared as a contestant on Comeback – Die große Chance (Comeback: The Big Chance), a German talent show featuring artists looking for a comeback.

In the television series Futurama, Coolio voiced Kwanzaa-bot, a rapping robot who spreads awareness about Kwanzaa. His first appearance was in the 2001 episode "Tale of Two Santas", his second was in the 2007 TV Movie Bender's Big Score, performing the song "This Trinity's Going to War", and his third and final appearance was in the 2023 episode "I Know What You Did Next Xmas". The latter episode was dedicated to him, as he had recorded his lines for the episode just weeks prior to his death.

In 2009, Coolio appeared as a housemate on Celebrity Big Brother 6, which he placed 3rd. He later went to appear on the UK's Ultimate Big Brother in 2010, where he decided it was best to leave the house after numerous confrontations with Nadia Almada and others there.

In January 2012, he was one of eight celebrities participating in the Food Network reality television series Rachael vs. Guy: Celebrity Cook-Off, where he represented the Music Saves Lives Organization. In June of the same year, Coolio voiced a wax figure of himself on Gravity Falls.

Coolio was featured on the March 5, 2013, episode of the ABC reality program Wife Swap, but his then-girlfriend left him after the program was taped. On June 30, 2013, he appeared alongside comedian Jenny Eclair and Emmerdale actor Matthew Wolfenden on the UK game show Tipping Point: Lucky Stars, where he came in second.

Coolio guest starred on a 2014 episode of the Adult Swim show Black Jesus titled "Gangsta's Paradise".

In July 2016, Coolio performed on ABC's Greatest Hits.

=== Other appearances ===
In 2019, Coolio appeared on the Irish rap group Versatile's track "Escape Wagon". He later featured on their 2021 album, Fuck Versatile, on the track "Coolio Interlude".

== Personal life ==
Ivey had ten children, four of whom were born to his wife, Josefa Salinas, whom he married in 1996 and divorced in 2000. In March 2022, he told Australia's Today Extra that he had five grandchildren.

In July 2008, Ivey and jazz saxophonist Jarez were enlisted as spokespersons by the group Environmental Justice and Climate Change to educate students at historically black colleges and universities about climate change. Ivey was a spokesperson for the Asthma and Allergy Foundation of America, as his children are asthmatic.

He hosted the online cooking show Cookin' with Coolio, an offshoot of his reality show, Coolio's Rules that ran for six episodes in 2008.

Ivey was the running mate for pornographic film actress Cherie DeVille's Democratic presidential run in the 2020 United States presidential election; they ended their campaign in January 2019.

=== Legal issues ===
In 1998, a court in Böblingen, near Stuttgart, sentenced Ivey to six months' probation and fined him $17,000 after convicting him of being an accessory to robbery and causing bodily injury after Ivey and his band members allegedly attempted to shoplift clothing worth $940 and then punched the store owner when he was caught. Ivey alleged that he was promised the clothing for free in exchange for signing autographs.

In 2016, Ivey and members of his crew were arrested for having a loaded firearm inside a bag at Los Angeles International Airport. The bag was flagged by the Transportation Security Administration as the group attempted to pass through a security checkpoint. One of his bodyguards claimed ownership of the bag, but Ivey later admitted that he was the owner and was subsequently sentenced to three years of probation and 45 days of community service.

In 2017, Ivey missed a performance after he was denied entry into Singapore upon landing at Changi International Airport. Singapore's Immigration and Checkpoints Authority declined to comment on the reason for the denial, citing reasons of confidentiality. Coolio had been traveling from Beijing to Singapore to perform at a Formula One concert event.

== Death ==
On September 28, 2022, Ivey was discovered unresponsive on the bathroom floor at a friend's house in Los Angeles, and was pronounced dead at the scene by first responders. He was 59 years old. The Los Angeles County Coroner's office announced that Ivey died from an overdose of fentanyl, heroin, and methamphetamine, with cardiomyopathy, chronic asthma, and cigarette smoking playing a major role in his death. He was cremated in a private ceremony, with a portion of his ashes encased in jewelry for his family and the rest put into an urn.

== Discography ==
=== Studio albums ===
- It Takes a Thief (1994)
- Gangsta's Paradise (1995)
- My Soul (1997)
- Coolio.com (2001)
- El Cool Magnifico (2002)
- The Return of the Gangsta (2006)
- Steal Hear (2008)
- From the Bottom 2 the Top (2009)
- Long Live Coolio (TBA)

== Filmography ==
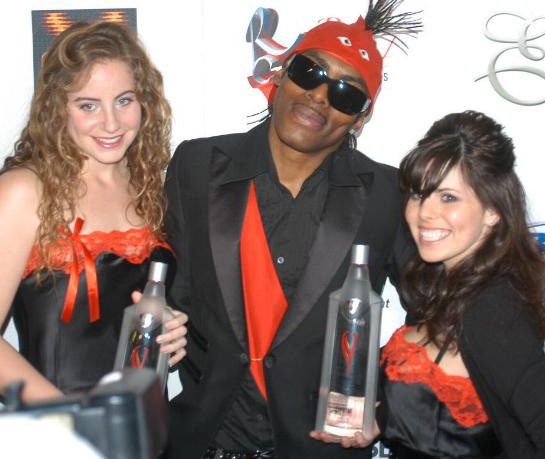
Coolio in 2007

=== Film ===
Year	Title	Role	Notes
1996	Phat Beach	Himself	
1996	The Big Help	Himself	
1996	Dear God	Gerard	
1997	Batman & Robin	Banker	
1997	On the Line	Lt. Gil Suggs	Television film
1997	An Alan Smithee Film: Burn Hollywood Burn	Dion Brothers	
1999	Judgment Day	Luther / 'Lucifer'	Video
1999	Tyrone	Tyrone / Jerome / Cherone	
1999	Midnight Mass	Blue Lou	
2000	The Convent	Officer Starkey	
2000	Leprechaun in the Hood	Himself	Video
2000	Submerged	Jeff Cort	
2000	Shriek If You Know What I Did Last Friday the 13th	Principal (AFKAP)	Video
2000	China Strike Force	Himself	
2000	Dope Case Pending		
2001	Perfume	T	
2001	In Pursuit	Carl Wright	Video
2001	Get Over It	Himself	
2001	Gangland	Officer Harris	
2002	Storm Watch	Outlaw	
2002	Media Whore	Himself	
2002	The Beat	Emcee	
2003	Daredevil	Dante Jackson	Director's cut version
2003	Ravedactyl: Project Evolution	Maduzor	Short
2003	Stealing Candy	Brad Vorman	
2003	Red Water	Ice	Television film
2003	Exposed	Big Heat	
2003	Tapped Out	Cool	
2003	Sex & the Studio 2		Video
2003	Four Fingers of the Trill	Himself	
2003	Stupidity	Himself	
2003	Move	Arthur / Ernest / Dre	Short
2004	A Wonderful Night in Split	Franky	
2004	Dracula 3000	187	
2004	Gang Warz	Dunzio Day	
2005	Pterodactyl	Capt. Bergen	
2006	Grad Night	Michael Adkins	
2006	Love Hollywood Style	Himself	
2007	Futurama: Bender's Big Score	Kwanzaa-bot	Voice, direct-to-video
2007	Sound, Verses Fury	Himself	
2007	Three Days to Vegas	The Flow	
2007	Don't Tell My Booker!!!	Himself	
2008	Chinaman's Chance: America's Other Slaves	Roger	
2008	Sides	The Star	
2009	The Lost Archives of Quincy Taylor	Archpimp Mac McFreddy	Short
2012	Two Hundred Thousand Dirty	Manny	
2012	Inertia	Promotional Trailer	
2015	Lord of the Freaks	Himself	
2017	Nina	Himself	
2018	Vantasic Voyage	Himself	
2018	United Skates	Himself	
2018	The Orange Years: The Nickelodeon Story	Himself	
2021	Fintech Rap Battle: Monzo VS Starling	Himself	

=== Television ===
Year	Title	Role	Notes
1995	The Parent 'Hood	The Gangster	Episode: "Trust a Move"
1995	Martin	Himself	Episode: "All the Players Came"
1995–1996	All That	Himself	2 episodes
1996	Space: Above and Beyond	The Bacchus Host	Episode: "R & R"
1996	Dangerous Minds	Sex Educator	Episode: "Pilot"
1996	Sabrina The Teenage Witch	Himself	Episode: "A Girl and Her Cat"
1996–2000	Kenan & Kel	Performer: Theme Song	TV series
1997	Duckman	Himself	Voice, episode: "Coolio Runnings"
1998	Match Game	Himself	5 episodes
1998	The Nanny	Irwin	2 episodes
1998	V.I.P.	Himself	Episode: "Vallery of the Dolls"
1999	Early Edition	Julius 'C-Roc' Ruby	Episode: "Number One with a Bullet"
1999	Malcolm & Eddie	Troy Jensen	Episode: "Daddio"
2000	Arli$$	Ernest	Episode: "It's Who You Know"
2001	Der Clown	Himself	Episode: "Stirb langsam"
2001	Fear Factor	Himself/Contestant	Episode: "First Celebrity Fear Factor"
2001–2023	Futurama	Kwanzaa-bot	Voice, 4 episodes
2002	Charmed	Lazarus Demon	Episode: "Marry-Go-Round"
2002	Static Shock	Marvin Roper / Replikon	Voice, episode: "Duped"
2002	Blind Date	Himself	TV series
2002	Holla	Himself	TV series
2002	Robbery Homicide Division	Greg / G-Down	Episode: "Alton Davis Redux"
2003	Make My Day		Episode: "Linda Narty"
2005	Joey	Himself	Episode: "Joey and the Poker"
2006	Клуб	Himself	Season 1, episode 14
2008	Cookin' with Coolio	Himself	TV series
2008	Coolio's Rules	Himself	Main cast
2009	Star-ving	Himself	Recurring cast
2009	The Sunday Night Project	Himself	Episode: "Lily Allen"
2012	Gravity Falls	Wax Coolio	Voice, episode: "Headhunters"
2014	American Hustle Life	Himself	Reality Show
2014	Black Jesus	Himself	Episode: "Gangsta's Paradise"
2017	Teachers	Mr. Wence	Episode: "First Day Back"
2021	Let's Be Real	Himself	Episode: "Episode #1.4"

== Awards and nominations ==
Coolio's 1995 song "Gangsta's Paradise", a remake of Stevie Wonder's "Pastime Paradise" received several awards, including Best Rap Solo Performance at the Grammy Awards and Best Rap Video and Best Video from a Film at the MTV Video Music Awards. Coolio himself received several awards, including Favorite Rap/Hip Hop Artist at the American Music Awards in 1996. At the Grammy Awards in 1997, Coolio received three nominations: Best Rap Album for Gangsta's Paradise, Best Rap Solo Performance for "1, 2, 3, 4 (Sumpin' New)", and Best R&B Vocal Performance by a Duo or Group for "Stomp". Overall, Coolio received five awards from fourteen nominations.

=== American Music Awards ===
The American Music Awards is an annual awards ceremony created by Dick Clark in 1973. Coolio received one award from two nominations.

Year	Nominee / work	Award	Result
1996	Coolio	Favorite Rap/Hip Hop Artist	Won
1997	Coolio	Favorite Rap/Hip-Hop Artist	Nominated

=== Billboard Awards ===
Year	Nominated work	Award	Result
1995	"Gangsta's Paradise"	Single of the Year	Won

=== Grammy Awards ===
The Grammy Awards are awarded annually by the National Academy of Recording Arts and Sciences of the United States. Coolio received one award from six nominations.

Year	Nominee / work	Award	Result
1995	"Fantastic Voyage"	Best Rap Solo Performance	Nominated
1996	"Gangsta's Paradise"	Record of the Year	Nominated
1996	"Gangsta's Paradise"	Best Rap Solo Performance	Won
1997	Gangsta's Paradise	Best Rap Album	Nominated
1997	"1, 2, 3, 4 (Sumpin' New)"	Best Rap Solo Performance	Nominated
1997	"Stomp"	Best R&B Vocal Performance by a Duo or Group	Nominated

- "Stomp" with Luke Cresswell, Fiona Wilkes, Carl Smith, Fraser Morrison, Everett Bradley, Mr. X, Melle Mel, Coolio, Yo-Yo, Chaka Khan, Charlie Wilson, Shaquille O'Neal, Luniz

=== MTV Video Music Awards ===
The MTV Video Music Awards is an annual awards ceremony established in 1984 by MTV. Coolio received three awards from six nominations.

Year	Nominee / work	Award	Result
1994	"Fantastic Voyage"	Best Rap Video	Nominated
1996	"Gangsta's Paradise"	Best Rap Video	Won
1996	"Gangsta's Paradise"	Best Video from a Film	Won
1996	"Gangsta's Paradise"	Viewer's Choice	Nominated
1996	"1, 2, 3, 4 (Sumpin' New)"	Best Dance Video	Won
1996	"1, 2, 3, 4 (Sumpin' New)"	Best Male Video	Nominated
