= George Brown (musician) =

American musician, founding member of Kool & the Gang

- Also known as: George "Funky" Brown
- Born: George Brown; January 15, 1949
- Died: November 17, 2023 (aged 74)
- Genres: Jazz; R&B; soul; funk; dance-pop; disco; boogie
- Occupations: Musician; singer; songwriter
- Instruments: Drums; keyboards; percussion
- Years active: 1964–2023
- Labels: De-Lite; Mercury
- Formerly of: Kool & the Gang
- Spouse: Hahn Phang

George Brown (January 15, 1949 – November 17, 2023), also known by the name George "Funky" Brown, was an American musician who was a founding member of the funk, R&B, and soul band Kool & the Gang. Born in Jersey City, Brown co-founded the group in the mid-1960s alongside Robert “Kool” Bell.

== Biography ==
As the band’s drummer, Brown provided the beat for the band's hits such as “Jungle Boogie,” “Hollywood Swinging,” “Ladies’ Night,” “Celebration,” and “Get Down on It.”

On November 17, 2023, Brown died of lung cancer.

=== Kool & the Gang ===
Ronald Bell, Brown, and other band members began playing at clubs in New York City under a series of different band names before settling on the name Kool & the Gang in 1968. Their debut album, Kool and the Gang, was released the following year. The band's first major hit came in 1973, with "Jungle Boogie", which charted at number 4 on the Billboard Hot 100. Their first number 1 hit single was "Spirit of the Boogie", which was released in 1975.

Kool & the Gang have won numerous awards, including two Grammy Awards, seven American Music Awards, and, in 2006, a Music Business Association Chairman's Award for artistic achievement. The band recorded nine No. 1 R&B singles in the 1970s and 1980s, including its No. 1 pop single "Celebration". They have seven American Music Awards, twenty-five Top Ten R&B hits, nine Top Ten Pop hits, and thirty-one Gold and Platinum albums. The group is honored on the Hollywood Walk of Fame and was inducted into the Songwriters Hall of Fame.

In 2024, Brown was selected for induction into the Rock and Roll Hall of Fame, as a member of Kool & the Gang.

== Discography ==
=== Studio albums ===
| Year | Album |
|---|---|
| 1969 | Kool and the Gang |
| 1972 | Music Is the Message |
| 1972 | Good Times |
| 1973 | Wild and Peaceful |
| 1974 | Light of Worlds |
| 1975 | Spirit of the Boogie |
| 1976 | Love & Understanding |
| 1976 | Open Sesame |
| 1977 | The Force |
| 1978 | Everybody's Dancin' |
| 1979 | Ladies' Night |
| 1980 | Celebrate! |
| 1981 | Something Special |
| 1982 | As One |
| 1983 | In the Heart |
| 1984 | Emergency |
| 1986 | Forever |
| 1989 | Sweat |
| 1992 | Unite |
| 1996 | State of Affairs |
| 2001 | Gangland |
| 2004 | The Hits: Reloaded |
| 2007 | Still Kool |
| 2013 | Kool for the Holidays |
| 2021 | Perfect Union |
