= Gangland (album) =

Studio album by Kool & the Gang
- Released: August 28, 2001
- Recorded: July 2000–May 2001
- Genre: Funk/R&B
- Length: 59:41
- Label: Eagle Music Group
- Producers: Hakim "Da Prince Hakim" Bell; Bill Irving; Khalis Bayyan; George "Funky" Brown; Rick Iantosca

Kool & the Gang chronology
State of Affairs (1996)	Gangland (2001)	The Hits Reloaded (2004)

Gangland is the twenty-first studio album by the band Kool & the Gang, released in 2001 following a five-year gap between albums. The album was a compilation of rappers backed by Kool and the Gang remaking some of the band's songs.

== Critical reception ==
Professional ratings
Review scores
Source	Rating
USA Today	2.5/4 stars

With a 2.5 out of 4 star rating, Steve Jones of USA Today wrote "Years before Kool rode vocalist James 'J.T.' Taylor's voice to pop success with songs such as Celebration, Cherish and Fresh, they were Hollywood-swinging with such street-oriented anthems as Jungle Boogie and Let the Music Take Your Mind. It's a freshened-up version of the latter funk-fueled jams that propel this new, hard-grooving set. The fusion of rap, jazz and R&B finds the band -- led by founding brothers Robert "Kool" Bell on bass and saxophonist Khalis Bayyan (Ronald Bell) -- joining an engaging pool of young talents."

== Track listing ==
No.	Title	Writer(s)	Length
1.	"Bigg Thangs"	Bayyan	4:09
2.	"Mo Bigg Thangs"	Bayyan	3:55
3.	"Blow Up"	Smith	3:32
4.	"Where da Boogie At?"	Kool & the Gang	3:38
5.	"Turn It Out"	Bayyan, Bell	3:33
6.	"Jungle in My House"	Bayyan, Brown, JAM Bell, Kool & the Gang	4:35
7.	"Money Makes the World Go Round"	Bell, Griffin, Irving, Moore, Rhodes	3:53
8.	"Ballin' in Chilltown"	Bell, Brown, Irving	4:24
9.	"That's Right"	Bell, Griffin, Irving	3:58
10.	"All My Time"	Bell, Brown, Hill, Irving, Moore, Young	5:19
11.	"Early in the Morning"	Simmons, Taylor, Wilson	3:20
12.	"Cherish"	Bell, Kool & the Gang, Taylor	4:47
13.	"Hit Me on the Hip"	English, Furusawa, Goddard, Ladawn, Peterson, SX4	3:49
14.	"Goody Goody"	Andrews, Cardwell, Peoples, Smith, Williams	3:23
15.	"Concrete Jungle"	G'Poetic, Bayyan, Kool & the Gang	4:28
16.	"Funk Done Gone Hip Hop"	Rivers, Scott, Shider, Shider, Thomas	4:14
17.	"Jazziacs at the Kool Jazz Café"	Bell, Kool & The Gang	6:13

== Personnel ==
Kool & The Gang

- Curtis "Fitz" Williams – keyboards
- Claydes Charles Smith – guitars
- Robert "Kool" Bell – bass
- George "Funky" Brown – drums, programming, backing vocals
- Dennis "Dee Tee" Thomas – alto saxophone, backing vocals
- Khalis Bayyan – tenor saxophone, backing vocals
- Clifford Adams – trombone
- Larry Gittens – trumpet
- Sennie "Skip" Martin – trumpet
- Shawn McQuiller – backing vocals

Additional musicians

- Hakim Bell – programming
- Bill Irving – programming
- Rick Iantosca – keyboards, guitars
- James Macon – guitars
- Felicia Moss – backing vocals
- Carla – backing vocals
- Kian Smith – backing vocals

Guest performers

- Da Prince Hakim (1, 4, 5, 9)
- II Saxxy (2)
- Female (3)
- NOVA (3)
- R.O.C. (4, 7, 9)
- Asaph Womack (5)
- FM (6)
- Rachid (6)
- Chad Live (7, 10)
- Youngblood (7)
- The Juice (8)
- Thunder (8)
- Devon (10)
- SX4 (11–13)
- Reign (14)
- NEP (14)
- G'Poetic (15)
- Funk-Kin (16)

=== Production ===
- Kool & the Gang – executive producers
- Steven K. Brown – A&R
- Hakim Bell – producer, mixing
- Bill Irving – producer, mixing
- Khalis Bayyan – producer, mixing
- George "Funky" Brown – producer
- Rick Iantosca – producer
- Andrzej Ramotowski – engineer
- Don Tittle – engineer
- Kendal Stubbs – mixing
- Duncan Stanbury – mastering at Frankford/Wayne Mastering Labs (New York City, New York)
- Kent Jeffrey – art direction, graphic design
- Mukbil Aktan – art direction, graphic design
- Ronnie Wright – photography
