= Unite (Kool & the Gang album) =

Studio album by Kool & the Gang
- Released: November 22, 1992
- Recorded: October 1991 – August 1992
- Genres: Funk; soul; new jack swing
- Length: 74:34
- Label: JRS
- Producer: Khalis Bayyan

Kool & the Gang chronology
Sweat (1989)	Unite (1992)	State of Affairs (1996)

Unite is the nineteenth studio album by the band Kool & the Gang, released in 1992 following a three-year gap between albums. It marked the return of Khalis Bayyan to the group after his absence on Sweat. The album was released on iTunes under the title "Jump Up On It!".

== Release and reception ==
Professional ratings
Review scores
Source	Rating
AllMusic	2/5 stars
Funk (Dave Thompson)	4/10
The Morning Star	2.5/5 stars
North County Blade-Citizen	B−

Kool & the Gang's first album in three years, Unite was originally released by the Los Angeles–based JRS Records before being re-released on April 27, 1993, by Mogull Entertainment, with the title track issued as the lead single on April 9. To coincide with the 1993 release, band member Robert "Kool" Bell presented some of the group's 1970s memorabilia at New York's Hard Rock Cafe. As with the group's previous album Sweat (1989), Unite was a commercial failure.

Vlado Forgac of The Morning Star commented that the absence of former Kool & the Gang singer James "J.T." Taylor radically altered the group's sound, and criticised the material for being "too much like older guys trying to be hip and young and sounding too obvious to be taken seriously." However, he added that listeners who were unfamiliar with the group's earlier material might enjoy the album's "'90s-ish R&B". North County Blade-Citizen reviewer Dan Bennett wrote that Unite is "where groove meets high-tech", further describing the songs as "cutting edge soul/jazz bites laced with the hip-hop urgency of that new street sound" and comparing them to James Brown's contemporary Universal James (1993). He found that despite the album sometimes "[straining] to find its own identity", he praised the group for possessing the "raw energy and musical know how" to survive. Corpus Christi Caller-Times reviewed the single "Unite" as an "uplifting call for peace" and praised singer Odeen Mays for "being inspirational without showboating".

== Track listing ==
No.	Title	Writer(s)	Length
1.	"(Jump on to the) Rhythm and Ride"	Khalis Bayyan, Gary Culpepper, Wyclef Jean, Dwania Kyles, Daryl Pediford	5:07
2.	"I Think I Love You"	Robert "Kool" Bell, George Brown, Kevin Grady, Ron Laxamana, Skip Martin, Charles Smith	4:49
3.	"Love Come Down"	George Brown	4:14
4.	"Pretty Little Sexy Miss"	George Brown, Khadiyjah Stone	4:15
5.	"Better Late Than Never"	Skip Martin, Darina Rollincová	4:39
6.	"Heart"	Khalis Bayyan, Wyclef Jean	4:45
7.	"My Search Is Over"	Odeen Mays Jr.	4:00
8.	"WKOOL"	Khalis Bayyan	0:21
9.	"Summer"		6:10
10.	"B. Ball"	Khalis Bayyan	0:58
11.	"Brown"		5:55
12.	"Give Right Now to You"	Odeen Mays Jr.	4:13
13.	"State of the Earth Address"	Khalis Bayyan, Dennis Thomas	0:49
14.	"The Weight"		3:58
15.	"It's Not Too Late"	Khalis Bayyan	0:47
16.	"Show Us the Way to Love"	George Brown, Kool & the Gang	5:20
17.	"Now Is the Time"	Khalis Bayyan	0:55
18.	"Unite"		5:50
19.	"Klassical Kool"	Sanford Allen	0:40
20.	"God Will Find You"	Skip Martin	4:48
21.	"Spatial Relationships"	Sanford Allen	1:27

== Personnel ==
Kool & the Gang

- Odeen Mays Jr. – keyboards, lead vocals
- George Brown – keyboards, drums, vocals, drum programming (2)
- Shawn McQuiller – guitars, lead vocals
- Charles Smith – guitars
- Robert "Kool" Bell – bass, vocals
- Robert "Robbie G" Goble – drums, percussion
- Dennis "Dee Tee" Thomas – saxophones, vocals
- Clifford Adams – trombone, vocals
- Sennie "Skip" Martin – trumpet, lead vocals

Additional musicians

- Gerard Harris – keyboards, guitars
- Kevin Grady – computer and synthesizer programming, drum programming (2)

String section (tracks 5, 7, 12 & 19–21)

- Maria Kitsopoulos – cello
- Fred Zlotkin – cello
- Alfred Brown – viola
- Jennie Hansen – viola
- Sanford Allen – violin, concertmaster
- Barry Sinclair – violin
- Dale Stuckenbruck – violin
- Belinda Whitney – violin
