= Spirit of the Boogie =

Studio album by Kool & the Gang
- Released: August 1975
- Recorded: 1975
- Studios: Mediasound, New York City, New York
- Genres: Funk; R&B; soul
- Length: 42:33
- Label: De-Lite
- Producers: Kool & the Gang

Kool & the Gang chronology
Light of Worlds (1974)	Spirit of the Boogie (1975)	Love & Understanding (1976)

Singles from Spirit of the Boogie
- 1. "Spirit of the Boogie" Released: March 13, 1975; 2. "Caribbean Festival" Released: October 13, 1975

Professional ratings
Review scores
Source	Rating
AllMusic	4.5/5 stars
BBC	(favourable)
Spin	(favourable)

Spirit of the Boogie is the sixth studio album by Kool & the Gang, released in 1975. It can be seen as a follow-up to Wild and Peaceful (1973); the instrumental "Jungle Jazz" uses the same basic rhythm track heard in "Jungle Boogie", but lets the players improvise on their instruments (saxophone, trumpet and flute). References to earlier works can be noticed ("Ancestral Ceremony" contains the line: "making merry music...", which was the name of a song from their 1972 album, Good Times). "Spirit of the Boogie" features Donald Boyce, who was rapping on "Jungle Boogie". Some African influence can be felt, and the band even play in a West-Indian style on "Caribbean Festival", another instrumental track, with once more much room for improvisation.

The LP cover mistakenly lists "Cosmic Energy" as track 4 instead of "Sunshine and Love". "Cosmic Energy" was actually released on the next album, Love & Understanding.

In one of the songs in the album, entitled "Jungle Jazz", the repetitive drum beat that is heard after the drum fill at the beginning has been sampled in over 50 songs, including "Don't Walk Away" by Jade and "Pump Up the Volume" by M/A/R/R/S; it can also be found as a sample in FL Studio's files.

== Track listing ==
Side one
No.	Title	Writer(s)	Length
1.	"Spirit of the Boogie"	Bayyan, Boyce, Kool & the Gang	4:52
2.	"Ride the Rhythm"	Bayyan, Kool & the Gang	2:55
3.	"Jungle Jazz"	Bayyan, Kool & the Gang	4:43
4.	"Sunshine and Love"	Bayyan, Kool & the Gang	3:46
5.	"Ancestral Ceremony"	Bayyan, Kool & the Gang	3:39

Side two
No.	Title	Writer(s)	Length
1.	"Mother Earth"	Bayyan, Brown, Kool & the Gang	5:38
2.	"Winter Sadness"	Bayyan, Smith, Kool & the Gang	5:04
3.	"Caribbean Festival"	Bayyan, Kool & the Gang	7:33

== Personnel ==
Kool & the Gang

- Ronald Bell – arrangements, vocals (1), acoustic piano (1, 2, 5, 7, 8), clavinet (1), ARP synth bass (1), tenor saxophone (1–3, 5, 6, 8), percussion (2, 3, 5, 6), ARP synthesizer (5, 7, 8), kalimba (5), alto flute (7)
- Ricky West – vocals (1, 2, 5), clavinet (2, 3, 5), acoustic piano (6), Moog synthesizer (6)
- Claydes Charles Smith – guitar (1–3, 6–8), arrangements (8)
- Kevin Bell – guitar (2, 6), arrangements (8)
- Robert "Kool" Bell – bass guitar (1–8), vocals (1), arrangements (8)
- George "Funky" Brown – drums (1–8), vocals (1, 2, 6), percussion (3, 5, 6), acoustic piano (6), arrangements (6, 8)
- Dennis "D.T." Thomas – alto saxophone (1–3, 6), vocals (1, 2, 5, 7), flute (3), percussion (3, 8), arrangements (8)
- Otha Nash – trombone (1–3, 6, 8), vocals (1–3, 6), arrangements (8)
- Robert "Spike" Mickens – trumpet (1–3, 5, 6, 8), vocals (1, 2), percussion (2, 3, 5, 8), arrangements (8)

Additional personnel

- Don Boyce – vocals (1)
- Something Sweet – backing vocals (5, 6)

Production

- Producers – Kool & the Gang
- Recorded and Mixed by Harvey Goldberg
- Overdub Engineers – Godfrey Diamond, Alec Head, Ray Janos, Terry Rosiello and Ron St. Germain.
- Mixed at Record Plant (Los Angeles, CA).
- Artwork – Frank Daniel and Diane Nelson
- Photography – Henry Arvinger

== Charts ==
Chart (1975)	Peak position
US Top LPs & Tape	48
US Top Soul LPs	5
US Top Jazz LPs	18

=== Singles ===
Year	Single	Chart positions	
Year	Single	US	US R&B
1975	"Spirit of the Boogie"	35	1
1975	"Caribbean Festival"	55	6
