= Sweat (Kool & the Gang album) =

Studio album by Kool & the Gang
- Released: June 1989
- Recorded: September 1988 – March 1989
- Studios: Quantum Sound Studios (Jersey City, New Jersey); Soundtrack Studios (New York City, New York); Sigma Sound Studios (Philadelphia, Pennsylvania); Aire L.A. Studios (Glendale, California)
- Genres: New jack swing; dance-pop; R&B
- Length: 52:37
- Label: Mercury
- Producers: Kool & the Gang; Royal Bayyan; Nick Martinelli; Curtis Williams; Chuckii Booker; George Brown; Claydes Charles Smith

Kool & the Gang chronology
Forever (1986)	Sweat (1989)	Unite (1992)

Singles from Sweat
- 1. "Raindrops" Released: 1989; 2. "Never Give Up" Released: 1989

Sweat is the eighteenth studio album by the band Kool & the Gang, released in 1989 following a three-year gap between albums. James "J.T." Taylor, Khalis Bayyan and Robert "Spike" Mickens had departed, and this album showed a refocused band.

== Singles ==
Both "Raindrops" (peak #27) and "Never Give Up" (peak #74) on the Billboard Hot Soul Songs chart.

== Critical reception ==
Professional ratings
Review scores
Source	Rating
AllMusic	1/5 stars

Ron Wynn of AllMusic called the album "a completely faceless, aimless record ... probably the worst album of their career". Hugh Wyatt of the New York Daily News called Sweat "one of the year's best recordings".

== Track listing ==
Side one
No.	Title	Writer(s)	Length
1.	"I Sweat"	Royal Bayyan	4:22
2.	"This Is What a Love Can Do"	John Bokowski, Jimmy Varner	4:13
3.	"Never Give Up"	David Bellochio, Stacy Habeeb	4:42
4.	"You Got My Heart on Fire"	Tony Haynes, Curtis Williams	6:29
5.	"Someday"	Royal Bayyan, Skip Martin	4:58

Side two
No.	Title	Writer(s)	Length
1.	"Raindrops"	Chuckii Booker	3:50
2.	"In Your Company"	Booker	5:53
3.	"I'll Follow You Anywhere"	Dorothy Sea Gazeley, Richard Scher	5:37
4.	"All She Wants to Do Is Dance"	Booker	3:55
5.	"How Can I Get Close to You"	George Brown, Dennis Thomas	4:22
6.	"You Are the Meaning of Friend"	Cathy Block, Claydes Charles Smith	5:06

== Personnel ==
Kool & the Gang

- Odeen Mays – vocals, keyboards
- Larry Gittens – keyboards, trumpet, vocals
- Claydes Charles Smith – guitars
- Robert "Kool" Bell – bass
- George Brown – drums
- Dennis "Dee Tee" Thomas – alto saxophone, percussion, vocals
- Clifford Adams – trombone, vocals
- Sennie "Skip" Martin – vocals, trumpet, percussion

Album performers

- Odeen Mays – lead vocals (1, 2, 4, 7, 10), backing vocals (2, 3, 5, 8), keyboard solo (2), keyboards (3, 11), programming (10), additional synthesizer strings (10)
- Skip Martin – backing vocals (2–6, 11), lead vocals (3–9, 11), trumpet solo (7), horns (8)
- Royal Bayyan – programming (1), keyboards (1, 5), guitars (1), backing vocals (1), drum programming (5)
- Curtis "Fitz" Williams – keyboards (1, 4), programming (4, 10), drums (4), backing vocals (4), synthesizer strings (10), drum programming (10)
- Curtis Dowd – keyboards (2, 8), bass (8)
- Jim Salamone – keyboards (2), drum programming (2, 8)
- Randy Cantor – keyboards (3, 8)
- Robert "Kool" Bell (Master Rock) – programming (4)
- Chuckii Booker – keyboard programming (6, 7, 9), drum programming (6, 7, 9), additional vocals (6, 7, 9)
- Donald Robinson – keyboards (8)
- Randy Bowland – guitars (2, 3, 8)
- Claydes Charles Smith – guitars (6, 10, 11), programming (11)
- Doug Grigsby – bass (3)
- Sonny Emory – drums (3)
- George Brown – percussion (6), programming (10), additional synthesizer strings (10), live drums (10)
- Dennis Thomas – alto saxophone (1, 10), sax solo (3), horns (8), saxophones (11)
- Clifford Adams – trombone (1, 11), backing vocals (2, 8, 10, 11), trombone solo (7), horns (8)
- Larry Gittens – trumpet (1)
- Rick Kerber – horns (8)
- Ron Kerber – horns (8)
- Troy Taylor – backing vocals (1)
- Steve Wise – backing vocals (2, 3, 8)
- Lori Fulton – backing vocals (3)
- Gary Brown – backing vocals (4)
- Patrice Linder – backing vocals (4)
- Tamala Renatyah Adams – backing vocals (10, 11)
- Debbie Robinson – backing vocals (10, 11)
- Penny Saunders – backing vocals (11)

Music arrangements

- Curtis Dowd – arrangements (2), rhythm arrangements (8)
- Jim Salamone – arrangements (2), rhythm arrangements (8)
- Rick Kerber – horn arrangements (3, 8), string arrangements (3)
- Ron Kerber – horn arrangements (3, 8), string arrangements (3), concertmaster (3)
- Skip Martin – BGV arrangements (4)
- Curtis Williams – arrangements (4), BGV arrangements (4)
- Chuckii Booker – arrangements (6, 7, 9)

Party people on "You Got My Heart on Fire"

- Lisa Barclay
- Robert "Kool" Bell
- Greg Biddlecome
- Gary Brown
- Terri Brown
- Curtis "B. Boy" Williams
- Curtis F. Williams Jr.
- Sandra Williams

== Production ==
- Royal Bayyan – producer (1, 5)
- Nick Martinelli – producer (2, 3, 8)
- Curtis Williams – producer (4, 10)
- Chuckii Booker – producer (6, 7, 9)
- George Brown – producer (10, 11)
- Claydes Charles Smith – producer (11)
- Kool & the Gang – producers (11)
- Lisa Barclay – coordinator
- Charles Stone – production manager
- Annette Cirrilo – cover art direction
- Sheryl Lutz-Brown – cover design
- Attitudes By Sakinah – wardrobe
- Jimmell Mardome – wardrobe designs
- Adil Bayyan – tour manager
- Jerome Phillips – tour managing assistant
- Buzz Willis – management, direction

Technical credits

- Mark Partis – engineer (1), tracking engineer (4, 5, 10, 11), mix engineer (10, 11)
- Tom Vercillo – engineer (1)
- Royal Bayyan – mixing (1)
- Franz Verna – mix engineer (1)
- Bruce Weeden – engineer (2, 3, 8)
- Tony Volante – tracking engineer (4, 5, 9, 10)
- Carl Beatty – mix engineer (4, 5)
- Craig Burbidge – recording (6, 9), mixing (6, 9), additional engineer (7), engineer (9)
- David Koenig – recording (7), mixing (7)
- Frank Cardello – assistant engineer (1, 4–6, 9–11), assistant mix engineer (4, 5, 10)
- Anthony Saunders – assistant engineer (1, 4, 5, 10), assistant mix engineer (11)
- John Sullivan – assistant engineer (2, 3, 8)
- Sal Viarlli – assistant engineer (2, 3, 8)
- Russ Elevado – assistant engineer (4)
- Gregg Barrett – assistant engineer (6, 7, 9)
- Jackie Forsting – assistant engineer (6)
- Anthony Jeffries – assistant engineer (7, 9)

== Charts ==
Chart performance for Sweat
Chart (1989)	Peak position
German Albums (Offizielle)	28
French Albums (SNEP)	29
Swiss Albums (Hitparade)	30
US Billboard Top Soul Albums	52
