= Feel the Need =

Feel the Need may refer to:

- Feel the Need (James "J.T." Taylor album), 1991
- Feel the Need (Leif Garrett album), 1978
- "Feel the Need", single by James "J.T." Taylor from the album of the same name, 1991

== See also ==
- "Feel the Need in Me", a song by The Detroit Emeralds
