= In the Hood =

Single by Kool & the Gang

from the album State of Affairs
- Released: 1996
- Genre: Funk
- Length: 3:48
- Label: Curb
- Songwriter(s): Charles Smith, J.T. Taylor, Ronald Bell
- Producer(s): J.T. Taylor, Ronald Bell

Kool & the Gang singles chronology
"Salute to the Ladies" (1996)	"In the Hood" (1996)	"Ladies Night (with Atomic Kitten)" (2003)

"In the Hood" is a R&B/funk song recorded by the band Kool & the Gang for their 1996 album State of Affairs. Released as a single, the song peaked at No. 27 on the UK R&B Singles chart. "In the Hood" was composed by Charles Smith, J.T. Taylor and Ronald Bell and produced by Bell and Taylor.

== Critical reception ==
Dan LeRoy of AllMusic found the band uses "robotic programmed rhythms to ruin even appealing tunes, like the wistful 'In the Hood'." Carl Allen of the Buffalo News wrote "In the Hood describes a laid-back black community that's unlikely to be portrayed elsewhere in the media today."
