= Misled =

Misled may refer to:

- "Misled" (Celine Dion song)
- "Misled" (Kool & the Gang song)
