= Father, Father =

Father Father may refer to:

- Father Father, album by Pops Staples (Grammy Award for Best Contemporary Blues Album, 1995)
- "Father, Father", song by Phantom Power (Super Furry Animals album)
- "Father, Father", song by Good Times (Kool & the Gang album)
