= Take My Heart (You Can Have It If You Want It) =

1981 single by Kool & the Gang

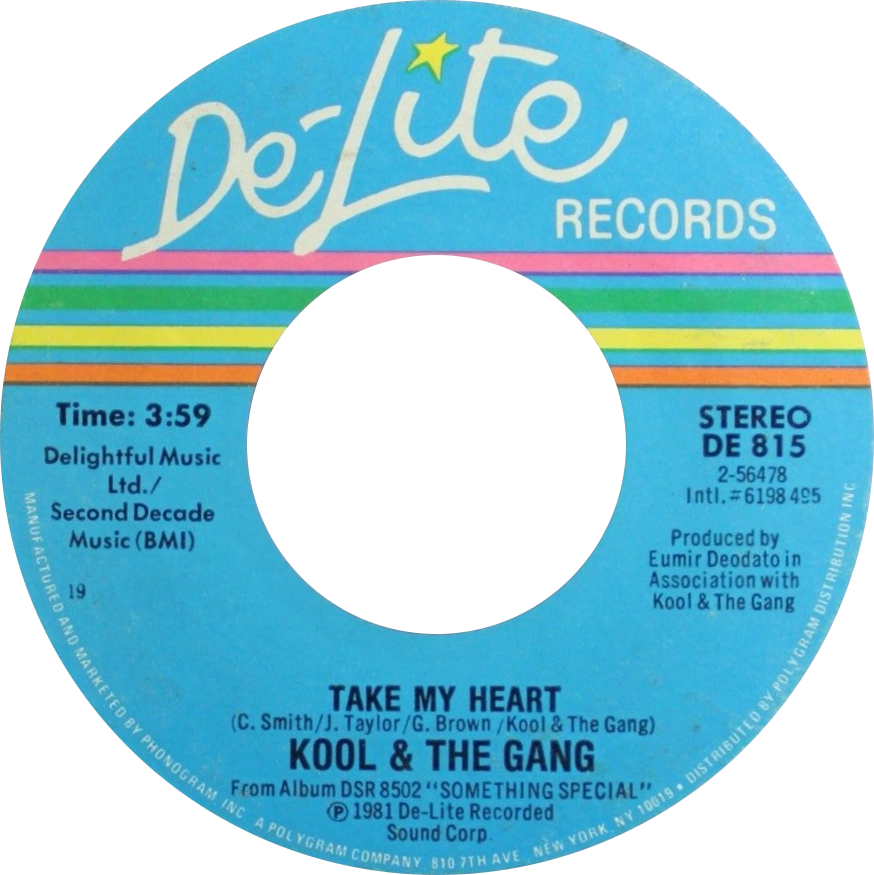
- One of side-A labels of US single

Single by Kool & the Gang

from the album Something Special
- B-side: "Just Friends"
- Released: October 1981
- Recorded: 1981
- Genre: Funk
- Length: 5:39; 3:59 (7"); 4:01 (12")
- Label: De-Lite
- Songwriters: Eumir Deodato, Robert Earl Bell, Ronald Nathan Bell, Claydes Charles Smith, James "J.T." Taylor and George Smith

Kool & the Gang singles chronology
"Jones vs. Jones" (1981)	"Take My Heart (You Can Have It If You Want It)" (1981)	"Steppin' Out" (1981)

Music video
- "Take My Heart (You Can Have It If You Want It)" on YouTube

"Take My Heart (You Can Have It If You Want It)" or "Take My Heart" is a 1981 single by American band Kool & the Gang from their thirteenth studio album, Something Special.

Record World said that "James Taylor soothes with a romantic croon and sexy rap while relentless keyboard waves and a sharp rhythm kick provide the backdrop."

== Track listing ==
No.	Title	Writer(s)	Length
1.	"Take My Heart (You Can Have It If You Want It)" (from the album Something Special)	Claydes Charles Smith, James Taylor & George Brown	3:59 / 4:01
2.	"Just Friends" (from the album Celebrate!)	Ronald Bell	4:23

== Charts ==
The single was the group's sixth number-one R&B single, reaching the top of the U.S. R&B chart for a single week and reached #17 on the Billboard Hot 100. Along with the tracks, "Get Down On It" and "Steppin' Out", "Take My Heart" went to the top 20 on the US dance charts.

Chart (1981–1982)	Peak position
UK Singles (Official Charts)	29
US Dance Club Songs (Billboard)	16
US Billboard Hot 100	17
US Hot R&B/Hip-Hop Songs (Billboard)	1

Year-end chart (1982)	Rank
US Top Pop Singles (Billboard)	85

== Robert Palmer version ==
British singer Robert Palmer covered the song under the title "You Can Have It (Take My Heart)" on his 1983 album Pride. His version was a minor hit, reaching number 66 in his native United Kingdom.
