= Fresh (Kool & the Gang song) =

1984 single

- Artwork for US 7-inch single

Single by Kool & the Gang

from the album Emergency
- B-side: "In the Heart"
- Released: November 24, 1984
- Recorded: 1984
- Genre: Post-disco; funk; dance-pop; R&B
- Length: 4:27
- Label: De-Lite; Mercury
- Songwriters: Robert Earl Bell; Ronald Nathan Bell; James L Bonnefond; George Melvin Brown; Claydes Charles Smith; James "J.T." Taylor; Curtis "Fitz" Williams; Sandy Linzer
- Producers: Kool & the Gang; Jim Bonnefond

Kool & the Gang singles chronology
"Misled" (1984)	"Fresh" (1984)	"Cherish" (1985)

Music video
- "Fresh" on YouTube

"Fresh" is a song by American group Kool & the Gang, released in November 1984 as the second single from their sixteenth album, Emergency (1984). The song peaked at number nine on the US Billboard Hot 100 and number 11 on the UK Singles Chart. It also reached number one on both the Billboard R&B and Dance charts.

A variation of the song was used for a Wendy's commercial in 1986.

== Music video ==
The action in the accompanying music video references the fairy tale Cinderella with the band performing the song at the ball. The two overweight women, the Ugly Sisters, are seen eating sandwiches, and a girl, Cinderella, cleaning the floor. Then suddenly Marilyn Monroe-lookalike Fairy appears and saves the day.

== Personnel ==
Kool & the Gang

- James "J.T." Taylor – lead vocals and backing vocals
- Curtis "Fitz" Williams – synthesizers (Yamaha DX1, Yamaha DX7, Oberheim OB-Xa, Roland Juno-60)
- Ronald Bell – Oberheim OB-8 and backing vocals
- Claydes Charles Smith – electric guitar
- George "Funky" Brown – drum machine (Oberheim DMX)

Additional musicians

- Kendal Stubbs – backing vocals
- Starleana Young – backing vocals

== Chart performance ==
The song was a hit, reaching number nine on the Billboard Hot 100 for the week of June 8, 1985, becoming the band's eighth top ten single on the chart. It topped the Hot Black Singles chart for the week of May 18, 1985, becoming their eighth number one single on the chart, staying there for a single week and was replaced at number one on the chart by fellow New Jersey musician Whitney Houston's "You Give Good Love".

== Track listings ==
- 12" maxi (De-Lite 881 564-1)
1. "Fresh" - 4:22
2. "Home Is Where the Heart Is" - 3:51
3. "Take My Heart" - 4:01
- 12" maxi (De-Lite 311122)
1. "Fresh" - 4:20
2. "Rollin'" - 3:11
3. "You Can Do It" - 4:08
- 7" single (De-Lite 881 564-7)
1. "Fresh" - 3:20
2. "Home Is Where the Heart Is" - 3:51

== Charts ==
=== Weekly charts ===
Chart (1984–1985)	Peak position
Belgium (Ultratop 50 Flanders)	8
Canada Top Singles (RPM)	10
Canada Adult Contemporary (RPM)	18
France (SNEP)	28
Ireland (IRMA)	19
Netherlands (Single Top 100)	27
Netherlands (Dutch Top 40)	34
UK Singles (Official Charts)	11
US Billboard Hot 100	9
US Dance Club Songs (Billboard)	1
US Adult Contemporary (Billboard)	5
US Hot R&B/Hip-Hop Songs (Billboard)	1
US Cash Box Top 100	10
West Germany (GfK)	26

=== Year-end charts ===
Chart (1985)	Rank
Canada	84
US Billboard Hot 100	89
US Hot R&B/Hip-Hop Songs (Billboard)	15
US Cash Box Top 100	95

== Certifications ==
Region	Certification	Certified units/sales
Canada (Music Canada)	Gold	50,000^{^}
United Kingdom (BPI)	Silver	250,000^{^}
United States (RIAA)	Gold	500,000^{‡}
^{^} Shipments figures based on certification alone.^{‡} Sales+streaming figures based on certification alone.

== Beat System version ==
"Fresh"

Single by Beat System

from the album Refreshinator
- Released: April 21, 1996
- Recorded: 1995
- Length: 3:42
- Label: Intercord
- Songwriters: Robert Earl Bell; Ronald Nathan Bell; James L Bonnefond; George Melvin Brown; Claydes Charles Smith; James "J.T." Taylor; Curtis "Fitz" Williams; Sandy Linzer
- Producer: Black Nero

Beat System singles chronology
"Stay with Me" (1995)	"Fresh" (1996)	"Reggae Night" (1996)

In 1996, German Eurodance project Beat System released their version of "Fresh", which samples the original with added vocals and rapping.

=== Track listings ===
- Maxi-CD
1. "Fresh" (radio mix) - 3:42
2. "Fresh" (extended DJ mix) - 5:32
3. "Fresh" (Crazy Z. version) - 3:33
4. "Call My Name" - 6:08
- Maxi-CD
1. "Fresh" (summer mix) - 3:07
2. "Fresh" (summer classic club version) - 5:05
3. "Fresh" (original Schnitzelmorph cut) - 5:49

=== Charts ===
Chart (1996)	Peak position
Austria (Ö3 Austria Top 40)	29
Belgium (Ultratop 50 Flanders)	37
Belgium (Ultratop 50 Wallonia)	18
Europe (Eurochart Hot 100)	50
Europe (European Dance Radio)	15
France (SNEP)	15
Germany (GfK)	32

== 2004 version ==
"Fresh"

Single by Kool & the Gang featuring Liberty X

from the album The Hits: Reloaded
- Released: 2004
- Genre: Dance-pop; disco
- Length: 3:14
- Label: Edel; V2
- Songwriters: Robert Earl Bell; Ronald Nathan Bell; James L Bonnefond; George Melvin Brown; Claydes Charles Smith; James "J.T." Taylor; Curtis "Fitz" Williams; Sandy Linzer
- Producers: Khalis Bayyan; Leigh Guest; George Brown

Liberty X singles chronology
"Everybody Cries" (2004)	"Fresh" (2004)	"Song 4 Lovers" (2005)

Audio video
- "Fresh" on YouTube

"Fresh" was re-recorded with the English-Irish pop group Liberty X in 2004, to feature on Kool & the Gang's re-recorded greatest hits compilation, The Hits: Reloaded. The new version of the song features Liberty X on vocals, and Kool & the Gang on instruments. It was released as a single in France where it peaked at number 35 in June 2004.

=== Music video ===
The music video for the single was recorded in late 2003, and features Liberty X playing to an audience in a club, all supported by mics and surrounded by a crowd of the group's fans. Kool & the Gang appear as guests inside the club, charming a woman who has arrived in search of a man.

=== Track listings ===
1. "Fresh" (album version) - 3:14
2. "Fresh" (Motivo Pop mix) - 4:28

== See also ==
- List of number-one dance singles of 1985 (U.S.)
- List of number-one R&B singles of 1985 (U.S.)
