= State of Affairs =

State of Affairs may refer to:

- State of affairs (sociology)
- State of affairs (philosophy)
- State of Affairs (album), a 1996 album by Kool & the Gang
- State of Affairs (TV series), a TV series which made its debut in fall of 2014
