= Steppin' Out (Kool & the Gang song) =

Single by Kool & the Gang

from the album Something Special
- B-side: "Love Festival"
- Released: 1981
- Recorded: 1981
- Genre: Disco; funk
- Length: 4:51
- Label: De-Lite
- Songwriters: Ronald Nathan Bell; Claydes Charles Smith; George Melvin Brown; James "J.T." Taylor; Robert Spike Mickens; Robert Earl Bell; Eumir Deodato

Kool & the Gang singles chronology
"Take My Heart (You Can Have It If You Want It)" (1981)	"Steppin' Out" (1981)	"Get Down on It" (1981)

Music video
- "Steppin' Out" on YouTube

"Steppin' Out" is a song by Kool & the Gang, released in 1981 as a single from their album Something Special. It reached number 89 on the Billboard Hot 100 and number 12 on the R&B chart. The song was re-released in 2004, featuring Beverley Knight, for the remix album The Hits: Reloaded.

Record World said it has a "big brisk beat...punchy horns and sleek backing vocals."

== Track listing ==
De-Lite Records – DE-815:

No.	Title	Writer(s)	Length
1.	"Steppin' Out" (From the album Something Special)	James Taylor & Ronald Bell	3:28
2.	"Love Festival" (From the album Celebrate!)	Claydes Charles Smith	4:55

== Charts ==
Year	Chart	Peak chart positions
1981	UK Singles	12
1981	Irish Singles	20
1982	Billboard Hot 100	89
1982	US R&B	12
1982	US Dance	16
