= Master of the Game =

Master of the Game may refer to:

- Master of the Game (George Duke album), 1979
- Master of the Game (novel), a 1982 novel by Sidney Sheldon
- Master of the Game (miniseries), a 1984 TV miniseries based on Sheldon's novel
- Master of the Game (James "J.T." Taylor album), 1989

== See also ==
- The Master of Game, medieval hunting treatise
- Gamemaster,
