= Emergency (Kool & the Gang album) =

Album by Kool & the Gang

Studio album by Kool & the Gang
- Released: November 15, 1984
- Recorded: October 1983 – August 1984
- Studios: Compass Point (Nassau, Bahamas); House of Music (West Orange, New Jersey)
- Genres: Pop; R&B
- Length: 35:47
- Label: De-Lite
- Producers: Kool and the Gang; Jim Bonnefond; Ronald Bell

Kool & the Gang chronology
In the Heart (1983)	Emergency (1984)	Forever (1986)

Singles from Emergency
- 1. "Misled" Released: November 2, 1984; 2. "Fresh" Released: November 24, 1984; 3. "Cherish" Released: May 1985; 4. "Emergency" Released: August 1985

Professional ratings
Review scores
Source	Rating
AllMusic	3/5 stars
Record Mirror	4/5 stars
Stereo Review	(favourable)
The Village Voice	B−

Emergency is the sixteenth studio album by the American band Kool & the Gang, released in 1984. It became the group's biggest selling album, earning Double Platinum status in America, Platinum in Canada, and Silver in the UK.

The album produced four US top 20 hit singles including "Fresh" (US No. 9); "Misled" (US No. 10); the title track "Emergency" (US No. 18); and the album's biggest hit, the million-selling "Cherish" (US No. 2). "Fresh", "Misled", and "Cherish" also cracked the top 40 in the UK reaching No. 11, No. 28, and No. 4, respectively, while "Emergency" reached No. 50.

== Track listing ==
All tracks are written by Kool & the Gang, with co-writing credits noted below.

Side one
No.	Title	Writer(s)	Length
1.	"Emergency"	George "Funky" Brown	5:17
2.	"Fresh"	James "J.T." Taylor; Sandy Linzer	4:22
3.	"Misled"	Ronald Bell	4:56
4.	"Cherish"	Ronald Bell	4:47

Side two
No.	Title	Writer(s)	Length
5.	"Surrender"	Curtis "Fitz" Williams	5:00
6.	"Bad Woman"	Brown	5:35
7.	"You Are the One"	Williams	7:00
Total length:			35:47

2016 Deluxe Edition bonus tracks
No.	Title	Writer(s)	Length
8.	"Fresh" (single version)	Taylor; Linzer	3:50
9.	"Misled" (single version)	Ronald Bell	4:07
10.	"Cherish" (single version)	Ronald Bell	4:00
11.	"Emergency" (single version)	Brown	4:10
12.	"You Are the One" (single version)	Williams	4:21

2016 Deluxe Edition disc 2
No.	Title	Writer(s)	Length
1.	"Fresh" (12" remix)	Taylor; Linzer	5:49
2.	"Misled" (12" remix)	Ronald Bell	5:35
3.	"Emergency" (12" extended remix)	Brown	6:58
4.	"Cherish" (12" remix)	Ronald Bell	5:41
5.	"The Throwdown Mix: Get Down on It / Ladies' Night / Fresh / Big Fun / Straight Ahead / Celebration / Misled / Emergency"	Taylor; Ronald Bell; Linzer; Brown	10:19
6.	"Fresh / Misled" (12" special mix)	Taylor; Linzer; Ronald Bell	6:13
7.	"Emergency" (12" alternative dance remix)	Brown	5:33
8.	"Cherish" (Saxophone edition)	Ronald Bell	4:33
9.	"Fresh" (12" dance mix)	Taylor; Linzer	6:21
10.	"Emergency" (12" remix)	Brown	5:31
11.	"Emergency" (12" dub version)	Brown	5:03

== Personnel ==
Kool & the Gang

- James "J.T." Taylor – lead vocals, backing vocals
- Curtis "Fitz" Williams – keyboards, Yamaha DX1, Yamaha DX7, Oberheim OB-Xa, Oberheim OB-8, Oberheim Xpander, Roland Juno-60
- Ronald Bell – Oberheim OB-8, tenor saxophone, backing vocals
- Claydes Charles Smith – electric guitar
- Robert "Kool" Bell – bass
- George "Funky" Brown – drums, Oberheim DMX
- Dennis "Dee Tee" Thomas – alto saxophone
- Clifford Adams – trombone, additional backing vocals (1)
- Robert "Spike" Mickens – trumpet
- Michael Ray – trumpet

Additional musicians

- Rick Iantosca – guitars (1, 3, 5, 6)
- Kendal Stubbs – bass (3), backing vocals
- Jimmy Maelen – percussions
- Starleana Young – backing vocals

Production

- Kool & the Gang – producers
- Ronald Bell – producer, mixing
- Jim Bonnefond – producer, engineer, mixing
- Kendal Stubbs – engineer, mixing
- Gabe Vigorito – mixing, album coordinator
- Jim Roth – assistant engineer
- Jose Rodriguez – mastering at Sterling Sound (New York, NY)
- Joni Weinstein – art direction, design, cover concept
- Murry Whiteman – art direction
- Lumel/Whiteman Graphics Design – graphics
- Brian Hagiwara – cover photography
- Lazaro Arias – stylist
- Roz Burns – make-up

== Certifications ==
Region	Certification	Certified units/sales
Canada (Music Canada)	Platinum	100,000^{^}
United Kingdom (BPI)	Silver	60,000^{^}
United States (RIAA)	2× Platinum	2,000,000^{^}
^{^} Shipments figures based on certification alone.
