= Baby I'm Back =

Baby I'm Back may refer to:

- Baby, I'm Back, a 1978 American sitcom
- Baby I'm Back (album), an album by James "J.T." Taylor
- "Baby I'm Back", a song by "J.T." Taylor from Baby I'm Back (album)
- "Baby I'm Back" (song), by Baby Bash featuring Akon
- "Baby I'm Back" (The Kid Laroi song), 2024
