= Forever (Kool & the Gang album) =

Studio album by Kool & the Gang
- Released: November 3, 1986
- Recorded: October 1985–August 1986
- Studios: Quiet Sound Studios and The Hit Factory (New York City, New York); Larrabee Sound Studios (North Hollywood, California); Record Plant (Los Angeles, California)
- Genres: Adult contemporary; urban; dance-pop
- Length: 48:59
- Label: Mercury
- Producers: Kool & the Gang; Khalis Bayyan; I.B.M.C.

Kool & the Gang chronology
Emergency (1984)	Forever (1986)	Sweat (1989)

Singles from Forever
- 1. "Victory" Released: November 1986; 2. "Stone Love" Released: February 1987; 3. "Holiday" Released: May 1987; 4. "Special Way" Released: 1987; 5. "Peacemaker" Released: 1987

Professional ratings
Review scores
Source	Rating
Allmusic	2.5/5 stars
Stereo Review	(favourable)

Forever is the seventeenth studio album by the funk band Kool & the Gang, released in 1986. The album included two major hits on the US Hot 100 Chart: "Victory" (US #10, R&B #2) and "Stone Love" (US #10, R&B #4). Three additional singles charted, "Holiday" reached the top ten on the R&B Chart, "Special Way" reached #6 on the Adult Contemporary chart. and "Peacemaker" was released in international markets and charted at #20 in New Zealand.

After this album, lead vocalist James "J.T." Taylor left the group to pursue a solo career. He returned in 1996 for the State of Affairs album.

== Reception ==
David Quantick of NME said, " two thirds of the time, Kool And The Gang are not terribly interesting. Forever is one of those thirds. It contains some lovely harmonising on the title track, some very vague hopes for peace and love, and about one decent song, a reasonably active affair called "Holiday" which bounces along happily and advises us once more to celebrate. This record is not excessively striking and soon I shall have forgotten it."

== Track listing ==
Side 1
No.	Title	Writer(s)	Length
1.	"Victory"	James "J.T." Taylor, Khalis Bayyan	4:37
2.	"I.B.M.C."	Taylor, Bayyan	4:14
3.	"Stone Love"	Charles Smith, Taylor, Kool & the Gang	4:37
4.	"Forever"	Dwania Kyles, Taylor, Bayyan	5:03

Side 2
No.	Title	Writer(s)	Length
1.	"Holiday"	Curtis Williams, Taylor, Kool & the Gang	4:12
2.	"Peacemaker"	George Brown, Taylor, Kool & the Gang	4:35
3.	"Broadway"	Williams, Taylor, Kool & the Gang	3:40
4.	"Special Way"	Kyles, Brown, Taylor, Kendall Stubbs, Bayyan	5:26
5.	"God's Country"	Gary Curtis Culpepper, Taylor	5:04

== Personnel ==
Kool & The Gang

- James "J.T." Taylor – all vocals (1, 3, 4, 7, 8), lead vocals (2, 5, 6, 9), percussion
- Khalis Bayyan – keyboards, saxophone
- Curtis "Fitz" Williams – keyboards
- Charles Smith – guitars
- Robert "Kool" Bell – bass
- George Brown – drums
- Dennis "Dee Tee" Thomas – alto saxophone
- Clifford Adams – trombone
- Robert "Spike" Mickens – trumpet
- Michael Ray – trumpet

Additional musicians

- Randy Taylor-Weber – synthesizer programming, creative software programming
- Mark Attalla – instruments
- Kendal Stubbs – instruments, drum programming, backing vocals (2, 5, 6, 9)
- Alex Williams – instruments
- Bert Clardy – backing vocals (2, 5, 6, 9)
- Jeff Clardy – backing vocals (2, 5, 6, 9)
- Lisa Foster – backing vocals (2, 5, 6, 9)
- Barbara Hernandez – backing vocals (2, 5, 6, 9)
- Starleana Young – backing vocals (2, 5, 6, 9)
- Kool & the Gang – backing vocals (6)

=== Production ===
- Gabe Vigorito – executive producer
- Kool & the Gang – producers
- Khalis Bayyan – producer, mixing
- I.B.M.C. Group (Khalis Bayyan, Peter Duarte, Meekaaeel Muhammad, Kendal Stubbs and Randy Taylor/Weber) – producers, recording
- Jay Biolic – recording
- Alex Williams – recording
- Craig Vogel – second engineer
- Peter Duarte – assistant engineer
- Roger Talkov – assistant engineer
- Kendal Stubbs – mixing
- Herb Powers Jr. – mastering at Frankford/Wayne Mastering Labs (New York, NY)
- Bill Levy – art direction
- George Corsillo – design
- Gil Gilbert – cover photography
- Carl Davis for Lemans Designs – fashions
- Rosalyn Burns-Brock – make-up

== Certifications ==
Certifications and sales for Forever
Region	Certification	Certified units/sales
Canada (Music Canada)	Gold	50,000^{^}
France (SNEP)	Gold	100,000^{*}
United States (RIAA)	Gold	500,000^{^}
^{*} Sales figures based on certification alone.^{^} Shipments figures based on certification alone.
