= Open Sesame (Kool & the Gang album) =

Studio album by Kool & the Gang
- Released: October 1976
- Recorded: 1976
- Genre: Funk, disco
- Length: 35:03 (LP); 51:33 (CD)
- Label: De-Lite
- Producer: Kool and the Gang

Kool & the Gang chronology
| Love & Understanding (1976) | Open Sesame (1976) | The Force (1977) |

Singles from Open Sesame
- 1. "Open Sesame" Released: October 24, 1976; 2. "Super Band" Released: March 19, 1977

Open Sesame is the eighth studio album by the funk band Kool & the Gang, released in 1976 on Mercury Records. The album reached No. 9 on the US Billboard Top Soul Albums chart and No. 33 on the US Billboard Top Jazz LPs chart. Open Sesame was the second of two studio albums released by the band in 1976. The title track became a top ten R&B single, and later part of the Saturday Night Fever soundtrack. The single "Super Band" also reached the R&B top twenty.

== Critical reception ==
Professional ratings
Review scores
| Source | Rating |
|---|---|
| AllMusic | 3/5 stars |
| The New Rolling Stone Record Guide | 2/5 stars |

Record World said that in the title track the group is "laying down a funky backbeat geared for the discos."

== Track listing ==
Side one
| No. | Title | Writer(s) | Length |
|---|---|---|---|
| 1. | "Open Sesame" | Ronald "Khalis Bayyan" Bell, Kool & The Gang | 3:46 |
| 2. | "Gift of Love" | Ronald "Khalis Bayyan" Bell, Donna Johnson, Kool & The Gang | 4:07 |
| 3. | "Little Children" | Claydes Charles Smith, Donna Johnson, Kool & The Gang | 5:28 |
| 4. | "All Night Long" | Claydes Charles Smith, Donna Johnson, Kool & The Gang | 3:53 |

Side two
| No. | Title | Writer(s) | Length |
|---|---|---|---|
| 1. | "Whisper Softly" | Ronald "Khalis Bayyan" Bell, Donna Johnson, Kool & The Gang | 6:04 |
| 2. | "Super Band" | Kool & The Gang | 4:54 |
| 3. | "L-O-V-E" | George Brown, Kool & The Gang | 3:23 |
| 4. | "Sunshine" | Robert "Spike" Mickens, Donna Johnson, Kool & The Gang | 3:28 |

CD release bonus tracks
| No. | Title | Writer(s) | Length |
|---|---|---|---|
| 9. | "Open Sesame, Part 2 (Groove with the Genie)" (Single Version) | Ronald "Khalis Bayyan" Bell, Kool & The Gang | 4:26 |
| 10. | "Super Band" (Single Version) | | 3:20 |
| 11. | "Open Sesame (Groove with the Genie)" (12″ Extended Disco Version) | Ronald "Khalis Bayyan" Bell, Kool & The Gang | 8:44 |

== Personnel ==
Kool & the Gang

- Ronald Bell – arrangements (1, 2, 5, 6, 8), vocals, keyboards, clavinet, ARP synthesizer, ARP String Ensemble, percussion, vibraphone, tenor saxophone, alto flute
- Ricky West – vocals (1), vibraphone (3), keyboards (4, 8)
- Claydes Charles Smith – acoustic guitar, electric guitar, percussion, arrangements (3, 4)
- Robert "Kool" Bell – bass guitar, percussion, vocals,
- George Brown – drums, percussion, keyboards (7), clavinet (7), vocals (7), arrangements (7)
- Dennis Thomas – alto saxophone, flute, percussion, congas, vocals
- Otha Nash – slide trombone, valve trombone, percussion, vocals
- Larry Gittens – trumpet, flugelhorn
- Robert "Spike" Mickens – trumpet, flugelhorn, percussion

Additional personnel

- Jimmy J. Jordan – special effects
- Ellouise Vaughn – harp
- Don Boyce – vocals
- Cynthia Huggins – lead vocals (2, 5, 7, 8)
- Donna Johnson – lead vocals (2)
- Something Sweet (Renee Connel, Cynthia Huggins, Joan Motley and Beverly Owens) – backing vocals
- Carry Muse – backing vocals (7)

Production

- Produced and arranged by Kool & The Gang
- Co-producer – George Brown
- Executive producers – Ronald Bell and Claydes Charles Smith
- Engineers – Terry Rosilleo and Nils Salminen
- Mixing – Terry Rosilleo
- Mastered by Nimitr Sarikanada at Frankfurt/Wayne Recording Labs (Philadelphia, PA)
