= Spirit of the Boogie (song) =

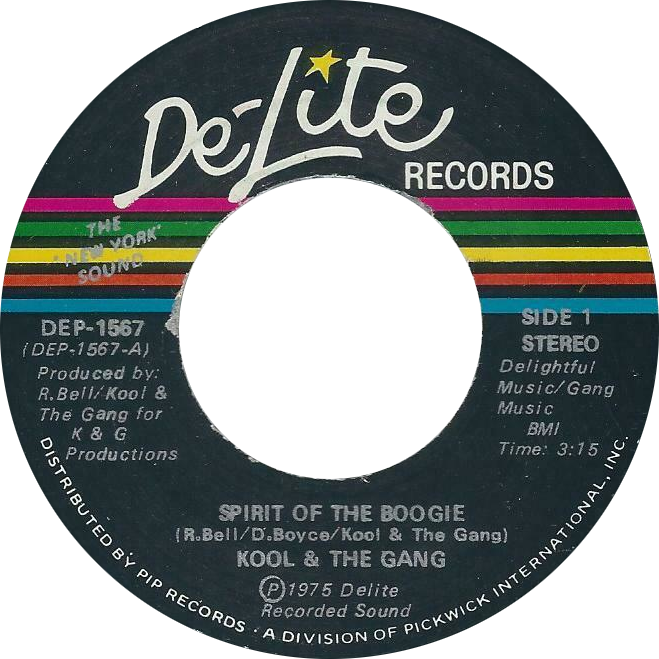
- Side one of US single

Single by Kool and the Gang

from the album Spirit of the Boogie
- B-side: "Summer Madness" (Nor. Am.) "Get Down with the Boogie" (intl.)
- Released: March 13, 1975
- Recorded: 1975
- Genre: Funk
- Length: 3:15
- Label: De-Lite Records
- Songwriters: Ronald Bell, Don Boyce & Kool and the Gang
- Producers: Kool and the Gang & Ronald Bell

Kool and the Gang singles chronology
| "Rhyme Tyme People" (1974) | "Spirit of the Boogie" (1975) | "Summer Madness" (1975) |

Audio video
- "Spirit of the Boogie" (album version) on YouTube

"Spirit of the Boogie" is a funk/soul song recorded by Kool & the Gang as the title track for their 1975 album.

== Critical reception ==
Daryl Easlea of the BBC said the song "showcases Claydes Smith’s tight, crunchy guitar grit and occasional member Donald Boyce’s "Boogie Man" vocals, as well as the Gang’s trademark group chants. Ronald Bell’s wayward synth gives it the requisite in-era cosmic edge." Amy Hanson of AllMusic proclaimed Spirit of the Boogie "is quintessential Kool & the Gang -- fiery funk which is kept in check by rhythm and chant." Record World said that the band's "jazz/rock expertise produces their mightiest outing since 'Hollywood Swingin'.'"

== Personnel ==
- Robert Kool Bell – vocals, bass
- Ronald Bell – piano, tenor saxophone
- Donald Boyce - Lead vocals
- George Brown – drums, vocals
- Robert Spike Mickens – trumpet, vocals
- Otha Nash – trombone, vocals
- Claydes Smith – guitar
- Dennis Thomas – alto saxophone, vocals
- Rick West – vocals

== Track listing ==
De-Lite Records – DE-1567:

| No. | Title | Writer(s) | Length |
|---|---|---|---|
| 1. | "Spirit of the Boogie" (From the album Spirit of the Boogie) | Ronald Bell, Don Doyce & Kool and the Gang | 3:15 |
| 2. | "Summer Madness" (From the album Light of Worlds) | Alton Taylor, Kool and the Gang & Robert Spike Mickens | 4:16 |

== Chart history ==
"Spirit of the Boogie" was the group's third single to top the soul singles chart in the U.S., and was their fourth Top 40 hit, peaking at number thirty-five on the Billboard Hot 100.

| Chart (1975) | Peak position |
|---|---|
| U.S. Billboard Hot 100 | 35 |
| U.S. Billboard Hot Soul Singles | 1 |

== Samples ==
- "Spirit of the Boogie" has been sampled by Doug E. Fresh and The Notorious B.I.G.
- It was interpolated in the Killers' 2017 song "The Man".
- Part of the song's melody was sampled in the Afros song titled "Feel It". The full song was sampled in "On the Black Line" by Michelle D'Clora.
