= The Power and the Glory (Jimmy Cliff album) =

Studio album by Jimmy Cliff
- Released: 1983
- Genres: Reggae; reggae pop; R&B
- Length: 40:58
- Label: Columbia

Jimmy Cliff chronology
Special (1982)	The Power and the Glory (1983)	Many Rivers to Cross (1984)

The Power and the Glory is an album by the Jamaican musician Jimmy Cliff, released in 1983. "Reggae Night" was nominated for a Grammy Award for Best Reggae Recording.

== Production ==
Cliff, who wrote seven of the album's songs, was backed by his band, Oneness. Earl "Chinna" Smith played guitar on the album. Kool & the Gang contributed to some of the tracks. "Piece of the Pie" incorporates lyrics from Bob Marley's "Them Belly Full (But We Hungry)"; it and "American Dream" are protest songs. "Reggae Night" was cowritten by La Toya Jackson.

== Critical reception ==
Professional ratings
Review scores
Source	Rating
The Albuquerque Tribune	B+
AllMusic	3/5 stars
Calgary Herald	B
Robert Christgau	C+
The Encyclopedia of Popular Music	3/5 stars
MusicHound Rock: The Essential Album Guide	3/5 stars
The Rolling Stone Album Guide	2.5/5 stars

The Globe and Mail wrote that "the creamy production values and Cliff's lovely tenor voice aren't quite enough to keep the attention from wandering away here from the banalities of the lyrics and arrangements." Robert Christgau noted that Cliff never takes "full advantage of his gifts, exemplified by the gracefully sung and adequately conceived international pop-reggae protest on side two." The Buffalo News praised the "light reggae rhythms mixed with familiar R&B melodies." The Calgary Herald concluded that "Cliff is at his hypnotic best." The Gazette opined that "Cliff is in perfect control of his sensitive, high-pitched vocals."

AllMusic stated: "No longer dealing in rough-around-the-edges songs of struggle and salvation riding on a tooting organ and insistent off-beat rhythm, Cliff began to sound more like the hybrid reggae/pop of Third World, Steel Pulse, and other groups whose careers he helped make possible."

== Track listing ==
No.	Title	Length
1.	"We All Are One"	4:31
2.	"Sunshine in the Music"	4:50
3.	"Reggae Night"	5:20
4.	"Piece of the Pie"	4:50
5.	"American Dream"	4:22
6.	"Roots Woman"	4:17
7.	"Love Solution"	3:58
8.	"Power and the Glory"	5:11
9.	"Journey"	3:39
Total length:		40:58

== Charts ==
Chart performance for The Power and the Glory
Chart (1984)	Peak position
Dutch Albums (Album Top 100)	29
New Zealand Albums (RMNZ)	25
