= Still Kool =

Studio album by Kool & the Gang
- Released: 2007
- Genres: Funk; soul; R&B
- Length: 88:01 (US); 73:23 (Europe)
- Label: New Door
- Producers: Curtis F. Williams; George Brown; Ronald "Khalis Bayyan" Bell

Kool & the Gang chronology
The Hits Reloaded (2004)	Still Kool (2007)	Kool for the Holidays (2013)

Professional ratings
Review scores
Source	Rating
The Philadelphia Inquirer	B−

Still Kool is a studio album by the band Kool & the Gang, released in 2007 on New Door Records. The European release consists of a single disc while the US release includes a bonus disc containing five re-recordings of the band's hit singles.

The album reached No. 31 on the US Billboard Top Soul Albums chart. Still Kool was certified platinum in France by the SNEP.

== Singles ==
"Dave" reached No. 13 on the US Billboard Top R&B/Hip-Hop Singles Sales chart. "Steppin' into Love" peaked at No. 7 on the Top R&B/Hip-Hop Singles Sales chart and No. 38 on the Billboard Adult R&B Songs chart.

== Track listing ==
Still Kool
No.	Title	Length
1.	"Dave"	4:46
2.	"Steppin' into Love"	4:17
3.	"America"	3:57
4.	"What's Happening"	1:39
5.	"Is What It Is"	2:50
6.	"Everything's Gonna Change"	3:57
7.	"Too Low for Zero"	5:17
8.	"Bang Bang with the Gang"	3:32
9.	"Made for Love"	4:10
10.	"Give It Up"	3:08
11.	"Trust Me"	3:55
12.	"Miracles"	4:20
13.	"Livin' in the 21"	4:17
14.	"Sorry"	4:50
15.	"Someone Like You"	5:52
16.	"Sailing" (Instrumental)	4:13

Circuit City exclusive bonus track
No.	Title	Length
17.	"Party People"	4:02

European release bonus tracks
No.	Title	Length
17.	"Party People"	4:02
18.	"Medley: Celebration / Ladies' Night / Get Down on It"	4:21
Total length:		73:23

US release bonus disc
No.	Title	Writer(s)	Length
1.	"Celebration"	Kool & the Gang; Ronald Bell	3:33
2.	"Hollywood Swinging"	Kool & the Gang; Rick Westfield	3:33
3.	"Joanna"	Kool & the Gang; Claydes Smith	4:19
4.	"Summer Madness"	Kool & the Gang; Robert Mickens; Alton Taylor	4:02
5.	"Ladies' Night"	Kool & the Gang; George M. Brown	3:30

== Certifications ==
Region	Certification	Certified units/sales
France (SNEP)	Platinum	200,000^{*}
^{*} Sales figures based on certification alone.
