= As One (Kool & the Gang album) =

Studio album by Kool & the Gang
- Released: September 7, 1982
- Recorded: October 1981–June 1982
- Genre: R&B
- Length: 35:56
- Label: De-Lite
- Producer: Eumir Deodato

Kool & the Gang chronology
Something Special (1981)	As One (1982)	In the Heart (1983)

Singles from As One
- 1. "Big Fun" Released: August 1982; 2. "Let's Go Dancin' (Ooh La, La, La)" Released: October 1982; 3. "Hi De Hi, Hi De Ho" Released: December 1982 (UK); 4. "Street Kids" Released: March 1983

Professional ratings
Review scores
Source	Rating
AllMusic	3/5 stars
Los Angeles Times	(favourable)

As One is the fourteenth studio album by the funk band Kool & the Gang, released in 1982. "Let's Go Dancin'" peaked at No. 7 on the U.S. R&B chart and No. 6 on the UK Singles Chart. "Big Fun" became an international hit.

== Track listing ==
All tracks are written by Kool & the Gang, with co-writing credits noted below.

Side one
No.	Title	Writer(s)	Length
1.	"Street Kids"	George Brown	5:50
2.	"Big Fun"	Brown; Robert "Kool" Bell; Ronald Bell	5:00
3.	"As One"	Marcangelo Perricelli; Robert Mickens	4:41
4.	"Hi De Hi, Hi De Ho"	Ronald Bell	4:22

Side two
No.	Title	Writer(s)	Length
5.	"Let's Go Dancin' (Ooh La La La)"	Ronald Bell	6:40
6.	"Pretty Baby"	Brown	4:43
7.	"Think It Over"	Curtis Williams	4:35
Total length:			35:56

2016 Deluxe Edition bonus tracks
No.	Title	Writer(s)	Length
8.	"Big Fun" (single version)	Brown; Robert Bell; Ronald Bell	3:54
9.	"Let's Go Dancin' (Ooh La La La)" (single version)	Ronald Bell	4:03
10.	"Street Kids" (single version)	Brown	4:01
11.	"Hi De Hi, Hi De Ho" (single version)	Ronald Bell	4:01
12.	"Let's Go Dancin' (Ooh La La La)" (US 12" promotional dance remix)	Ronald Bell	4:53
13.	"Street Kids" (US 12" dance remix)	Brown	4:19
Total length:			60:54

== Personnel ==
Kool & the Gang

- James "J.T." Taylor – lead vocals, backing vocals
- Curtis "Fitz" Williams – keyboards, alto saxophone
- Ronald Bell – OB-X synthesizer, tenor saxophone, backing vocals
- Charles Smith – guitars
- Robert "Kool" Bell – bass guitar, backing vocals
- George "Funky" Brown – drums, backing vocals
- Dennis "Dee Tee" Thomas – handclaps
- Clifford Adams – trombone, backing vocals
- Robert "Spike" Mickens – trumpet
- Michael Ray – trumpet

Additional musicians

- Eumir Deodato – keyboards
- Jimmy Maelen – percussion
- Steve Greenfield – alto saxophone
- Kermit Moore and friends – strings

=== Production ===
- Eumir Deodato – producer, mixing
- Kool & the Gang – associate producers
- Jim Bonnefond – chief engineer, mixing
- Cliff Hodsdon – engineer
- Gabe Vigorito – mixing, mastering
- Nelson Ayres – assistant engineer
- Barbara Ivone – assistant engineer
- Jose Rodriguez – mastering
- Bob Heimall – art direction
- Bill Levy – art direction
- Mo Ström – design
- Quintet Associates – cover concept, artwork

== Certifications ==
Region	Certification	Certified units/sales
United States (RIAA)	Gold	500,000^{^}
^{^} Shipments figures based on certification alone.
