= Open Sesame (Kool & the Gang song) =

Single by Kool & the Gang

from the album Open Sesame
- B-side: "Open Sesame (Groove with the Genie)" – Part 2
- Released: 1976
- Recorded: 1976
- Genre: Funk, disco
- Length: 3:43
- Label: De-Lite
- Songwriters: Robert "Kool" Bell, Ronald Bell, George "Funky" Brown, Claydes Smith, Dennis "D.T." Thomas
- Producer: Kool & the Gang

Kool & the Gang singles chronology
"Universal Sound" (1976)	"Open Sesame" (1976)	"Super Band" (1977)

Audio video
- "Open Sesame (Groove with the Genie)" – (Part 1) on YouTube

"Open Sesame" is a song recorded by Kool & the Gang for their 1976 eponymous studio album. The song, issued as a single in 1976 by De-Lite Records, reached No. 6 on the US Billboard Hot Soul Singles chart and No. 13 on the US Billboard Disco Action chart.

== Compendium ==
"Open Sesame" was produced by K.G productions along with Mr. Vee productions. Also known as "Open Sesame Part 1", the tune interpolated Sol Bloom's "The Streets of Cairo" and was written by Robert "Kool" Bell, Ronald Bell, George "Funky" Brown, Claydes Smith, and Dennis "D.T." Thomas. The single's B-side was "Open Sesame – Part 2 (Groove with the Genie)". The song first appeared on the group's 1976 studio album Open Sesame, and was subsequently included on the soundtrack to the 1977 feature film Saturday Night Fever.

== Critical reception ==
Stephen M. Deusner of Pitchfork wrote "'Open Sesame' doesn't rank among Kool & the Gang's absolute best cuts, but its silly vocals and breakneck horns are nevertheless impressive." Tyler Golsen of Far Out also declared "'Open Sesame' is a solid addition to the disco canon from some of the masters of the genre."

== Legacy ==
"Open Sesame" has been sampled on "L.A., L.A." by Capone-N-Noreaga featuring Tragedy Khadafi and Mobb Deep from the duo's 1997 studio album The War Report. The Beastie Boys sampled "Open Sesame" on "Shazam!" featuring Mix Master Mike from the group's 2004 studio album To the 5 Boroughs.

== Personnel ==
- Khalis Bayyan – alto flute, clavinet, keyboards, percussion, tenor saxophone, vocals
- Robert "Kool" Bell – bass guitar, percussion, vocals
- George Brown – drums, percussion
- Robert Spike Mickens – flugelhorn, percussion, trumpet
- Claydes Smith – acoustic guitar, electric guitar, percussion
- Dennis "D.T." Thomas – alto saxophone, congas, flute, vocals
- Donald Boyce – Genie voice
- Khalif Bryant – vibraphone
- Ellouise Daughn – harp
- Larry Gittens – flugelhorn, trumpet
- Otha Nash – percussion, trombone, valve trombone, vocals
- Ricky West – vocals
- Something Sweet – backing vocals
- Producer – Kool & the Gang
- Co-producer – George Brown
- Recording engineers – Terry Rosiello, Nils Salminen
- Mixing engineer – Terry Rosiello
- Mastering engineer – Nimitr Sarikananda
- Arrangements – Khalis Bayyan, Kool & the Gang

== Charts ==
Chart (1975)	Peak position
US Billboard Hot 100	55
US Billboard Hot Soul Singles	6
US Billboard Disco Action	13
Canada Dance/Urban Top 30 (1976)	24
Canada Top 100 (1977)	70
