= Funky Stuff =

Single by Kool & the Gang

from the album Wild and Peaceful
- B-side: "More Funky Stuff"
- Released: 1973
- Genre: Funk
- Length: 2:59
- Label: Mercury
- Songwriter: Kool & the Gang
- Producer: Kool & the Gang

Kool & the Gang singles chronology
"Country Junky" (1973)	"Funky Stuff" (1973)	"Jungle Boogie" (1973)

Audio video
- "Funky Stuff" on YouTube

"Funky Stuff" is a funk song written, produced, and recorded by Kool & the Gang for their 1973 album Wild and Peaceful. Released as a single, the song reached No. 5 on the US Billboard Hot Soul Singles chart and No. 29 on the US Billboard Hot 100 chart.

== Critical reception ==
Amy Hanson of AllMusic wrote "Recording at the tiny Media Sound Studio in New York, one floor above Latin rockers Santana, the band jammed the track together as Santana's own session bled through the walls and floors. The resultant fusion was as inspiring as it was exciting -- certainly the sound of two so-disparate bands clashing in one tiny space helped to influence Kool's grooves and, by the time the session was over, this nine-minute marathon was on course to becoming a genre standard -- one of the best ever committed to vinyl grooves. Vital evidence of the band's new direction in sound, the song is the embodiment of heavy, deep funk, driven by horns and an effervescent beat. James Hamilton of Record Mirror also found "Funky Stuff" is "Ideal disco, fare, It's a whistle and chanting supported monotonous honking instrumental with somepicky guitar over the braying brass and dully thumping rhythm. Parrty Pick." Record World said the song is "funk & fun from the gang and includes lotsa percussion and whistles." Irvine Herald reviewer Willie Freckleton named it "Freck's Freak of the Week for soul fans," saying that it is "a soul fan's paradise" with "whistle blowing, chanting the title and laden with atmosphere."

Although popular in some regions, including New York, "Funky Stuff" was banned by some radio stations for using the word "funky."

== Legacy ==
"Funky Stuff" has been sampled by artists such as the Beastie Boys, Gangstarr, Mobb Deep, N.W.A. and Dilated Peoples. The tune has been covered by jazz guitarist Chuck Loeb and French singer-songwriter Lizzy Mercier Descloux.

== Personnel ==
- Khalis Bayyan – soprano saxophone, tenor saxophone, vocals
- Robert "Kool" Bell – Fender bass guitar, vocals
- George "Funky" Brown – drums, vocals
- Robert Spike Mickens – vocals
- Dennis "D.T." Thomas – conga, flute, alto saxophone, vocals
- Clay Smith – guitar
- Ricky West – vocals

== Charts ==
Chart (1973)	Peak position
US Billboard Hot 100	29
US Hot R&B/Hip-Hop Songs (Billboard)	5
