= Three Ounces of Love (album) =

Studio album by Three Ounces of Love
- Released: April 1978
- Recorded: December 1977
- Studio: Motown Recording Studios
- Genre: Disco, soul
- Length: 34:41
- Language: English
- Label: Motown
- Producer: Brian Holland; Harold Johnson; Andrew Porter; Brenda Sutton; Michael B. Sutton; Greg Wright

Three Ounces of Love is the sole studio album by American girl group Three Ounces of Love, released on Motown in 1978. Though the group had some successful singles and plans for a follow-up album, this was their only one.

== Reception ==
Editors of The New Rolling Stone Record Guide scored this release two out of five stars, comparing it unfavorably to other groups like Love Unlimited and Three Degrees, writing that the album lacks decent music. A 2023 review of the top Motown girl groups published by Universal Music included Three Ounces of Love, calling “Give Me Some Feeling” "particularly gorgeous, with its delicate backing vocals and funky bassline".

== Track listing ==
1. "Star Love" (Ronnie Vann and Greg Wright) – 4:39
2. "I Only Get This Feeling" (Harold Johnson and Andrew Porter) – 3:25
3. "I Don't Worry 'Bout My Love" (Karin Patterson and Wright) – 5:08
4. "Bet You'll Come Running" (Patterson, Vann, and Wright) – 4:11
5. "I've Got a Right to Be Loved" (Harold Beatty, Brian Holland, Eddie Holland, and Marlon Woods) – 3:15
6. "In the Middle of the Feeling" (Beatty, B. Holland, and E. Holland) – 4:10
7. "Give Me Some Feeling" (Brenda Sutton, Michael B. Sutton, and Kathy Wakefield) – 5:50
8. "Today Will Soon Be Yesterday" (M. Sutton and Pam Sawyer) – 4:03

== Personnel ==
Three Ounces of Love

- Anne Alexander – vocals
- Elaine Alexander – vocals
- Regina Alexander – vocals

Additional personnel

- Bob Robitaille – engineering
- Oliver Ferrand – liner notes photography
- Jimmie Haskell – arrangement on "Star Love" and "Don't Worry 'bout My Love"
- Brian Holland – production on "I've Got a Right to Be Loved" and "In the Middle of the Feeling"
- L. T. Horn – engineering
- Suzee Wendy Ikeda – production coordination assistance
- McKinley Jackson – rhythm arrangement on "In the Middle of the Feeling" and "I've Got a Right to Be Loved", horn arrangement on "In the Middle of the Feeling"
- Harold Johnson – arrangement on "I Only Get This Feeling" and "Don't Worry 'bout My Love", co-production on "I Only Get This Feeling"
- Tony Jones – album coordination
- Wriston Jones – art direction, design
- Tom Kelley – cover photography
- Gene Page – horn arrangement on "I've Got a Right to Be Loved", rhythm arrangement on "I've Got a Right to Be Loved"
- Barney Perkins – engineering
- Andrew Porter co-production on "I Only Get This Feeling" and "Don't Worry 'bout My Love",
- Kim Richmond – arrangement on "Give Me Some Feeling" and "Today Will Soon Be Yesterday"
- Fred Ross – engineering
- Michael Schulman – engineering
- Art Stewart – engineering
- Brenda Sutton – production on "Give Me Some Feeling" and "Today Will Soon Be Yesterday"
- Michael B. Sutton – production on "Give Me Some Feeling" and "Today Will Soon Be Yesterday"
- Russ Terrana – engineering
- Ronnie Vann – arrangement on "Star Love"
- Greg Wright – arrangement on "Star Love", "I Only Get This Feeling", "Don't Worry 'bout My Love", and "Bet You'll Come Running"; production on "Star Love", "I Only Get This Feeling", "Don't Worry 'bout My Love", and "Bet You'll Come Running"

== See also ==
- List of 1978 albums
