= Something Special (Kool & the Gang album) =

Studio album by Kool & the Gang
- Released: September 24, 1981
- Recorded: 1980–1981
- Studios: House of Music (West Orange, New Jersey); Kendun Recorders (Los Angeles); Secret Sound (New York City)
- Genres: Pop; soul
- Length: 36:18
- Label: De-Lite
- Producer: Eumir Deodato

Kool & the Gang chronology
| Celebrate! (1980) | Something Special (1981) | As One (1982) |

Singles from Something Special
- 1. "Steppin' Out" Released: September 1981; 2. "Take My Heart (You Can Have It If You Want It)" Released: October 1981; 3. "Get Down on It" Released: November 24, 1981

Something Special is the thirteenth studio album by American band Kool & the Gang, released in 1981. It was the group's third consecutive platinum-certified album. "Stand Up and Sing" was featured in 1982's The Pirate Movie.

== Reception ==
Professional ratings
Review scores
| Source | Rating |
|---|---|
| AllMusic | 4/5 stars |
| The Boston Globe | (favorable) |
| Record Mirror | 3/5 stars |
| The Rolling Stone Album Guide | 2/5 stars |

It continued the level of success that the band's previous two albums brought, containing several hit singles including "Steppin' Out" which reached No. 12 on the R&B chart and No. 89 on the Pop chart, "Take My Heart" which went to No. 1 on the R&B chart and No. 17 on the Pop chart, and "Get Down on It" which reached No. 4 on the R&B chart and No. 10 on the Pop chart. In the UK, the album reached No. 10, becoming their first hit album there and most successful studio album of all, largely due to the success of the "Get Down on It" single.

== Track listing ==
All tracks are written by Kool & the Gang, with co-writing credits noted below.

Side one
| No. | Title | Writer(s) | Length |
|---|---|---|---|
| 1. | "Steppin' Out" | James "J.T." Taylor; Ronald Bell | 4:51 |
| 2. | "Good Time Tonight" | Taylor; Ronald Bell | 4:59 |
| 3. | "Take My Heart" | Claydes Smith; George Brown; Taylor | 3:59 |
| 4. | "Be My Lady" | Ronald Bell | 4:14 |

Side two
| No. | Title | Writer(s) | Length |
|---|---|---|---|
| 1. | "Get Down on It" | Taylor; Ronald Bell | 4:58 |
| 2. | "Pass It On" | Brown; Taylor | 4:34 |
| 3. | "Stand Up and Sing" | Taylor; Ronald Bell | 4:35 |
| 4. | "No Show" | Brown; Taylor; Ronald Bell | 4:25 |
| Total length: | | | 36:18 |

1998 CD reissue bonus track
| No. | Title | Writer(s) | Length |
|---|---|---|---|
| 9. | "Stop!" | Ronald Bell | 3:22 |
| Total length: | | | 39:58 |

2016 Deluxe Edition bonus tracks
| No. | Title | Writer(s) | Length |
|---|---|---|---|
| 9. | "Steppin' Out" (12" mix) | Taylor; Ronald Bell | 5:34 |
| 10. | "Get Down on It" (12" mix) | Taylor; Ronald Bell | 6:08 |
| 11. | "Take My Heart (You Can Have It If You Want It)" (12" mix) | Smith; Brown; Taylor | 5:04 |
| 12. | "Stop!" | Ronald Bell | 3:23 |
| 13. | "Steppin' Out" (single remix) | Taylor; Ronald Bell | 3:32 |
| 14. | "Get Down on It" (single version) | Taylor; Ronald Bell | 3:33 |
| 15. | "Take My Heart (You Can Have It If You Want It)" (single remix) | Smith; Brown; Taylor | 3:44 |
| Total length: | | | 67:41 |

== Personnel ==
- Bass, backing vocals – Robert "Kool" Bell
- Lead guitar – Charles Smith
- Saxophone, keyboards, backing vocals – Ronald Bell
- Drums, backing vocals – George Brown
- Lead and backing vocals – James "J.T." Taylor
- Alto saxophone – Dennis Thomas
- Alto saxophone, flute, backing vocals – Steve Greenfield
- Trombone – Clifford Adams
- Trumpet, backing vocals – Michael Ray, Robert Mickens
- Keyboards – Brian Jackson
- Keyboards – Eumir Deodato
- Additional percussion – Jimmy Maelen
- Additional handclaps – Platinum Hook
- Backing vocals – Clifford Adams, Cynthia Huggins, Joan Motley, Kelly Barretto

Production

- Engineer – Jim Bonnefond
- Assistant engineers – Bobby Scott Cohen, Cliff Hodson, Joe DeAngelis, Julian Robertson
- Overdubs engineers – Bob "Ziggy" Winard, Mallory Earl
- Mixed by – Eumir Deodato, Jim Bonnefond, Gabe Vigorito
- Mastered by – Tom Coyne, Stephan Galfas (Assistant)
- Producer – Eumir Deodato
- Associate producer – Kool & the Gang
- CD mastering – Joe Gastwirt

== Charts ==
| Chart (1981) | Peak position |
|---|---|
| Billboard Pop Albums | 12 |
| Billboard Top Soul Albums | 1 |
| UK Albums Chart | 10 |

== Certifications ==
| Region | Certification | Certified units/sales |
|---|---|---|
| United Kingdom (BPI) | Gold | 100,000^{^} |
| United States (RIAA) | Platinum | 1,000,000^{^} |
^{^} Shipments figures based on certification alone.

== See also ==
- List of number-one R&B albums of 1981 (U.S.)
