= Three Ounces of Love =

Girl group

- Origin: Detroit, Michigan, US
- Genres: Funk, soul, disco
- Years active: 1977–1993
- Labels: Motown; Motorcity
- Past members: Anne Alexander; Elaine Alexander; Regina Alexander

Three Ounces of Love was a group from Detroit's West Side that consisted of three sisters. In the late 1970s, they went on tour as the opening act for the Commodores. They had a local disco hit with "Disco Man".

== History ==
The group members were all sisters from the Alexander family. The oldest was Anne, born on July 14, 1955. The middle sister was Elaine, born on September 10, 1956. The youngest was Regina born on September 18, 1957. Early in their career, they performed locally in Detroit at the 20 Grand and the Dearborn Townhouse.

In 1977, along with another group Platinum Hook, they were signed to Benjamin Ashburn's production company. They signed a contract with Motown Records and recorded for the label. The result of the session, an album titled Three Ounces of Love, was released in February 1978. The group re-entered the studio in early 1979, but this proved to be their only ever LP, and the group would release no more material until signing with Ian Levine's Motown-revival label Motorcity Records over a decade later. There they released one single, "Newsy Neighbours", in 1991.

== Live events ==
The March 1978 issue of Billboard reported that in April, they along with a four-man brass section called the Mean Machine, were to accompany the Commodores on a Major European tour starting on the 13th of that month. In May 1978, they played the Golden Rose. They played at the Nassau Coliseum in July 1978 along with The Commodores and Con Funk Shun. While opening for the Commodores they were performing to nearly 12,000 patrons. At various times they sang the national anthem at the Tiger Stadium.

== Releases ==
Albums

- Three Ounces of Love Motown M7-901R1 (1978)

Singles

- "Disco Man" / "Disco Man" Instrumental – IX Chains NCS 7017 (1976)
- "Star Love" / "I Found The Feeling" Motown 1439 (1978)
- "Give Me Some Feeling" / "Don't Worry 'Bout My Love" Motown TMG 1119 (1978)
- "Newsy Neighbours" / "Newsy Neighbours" Remix Motorcity Records – MOTC 37 (12")(1991)
- "Double Cross" / "True Believer" NU & Improved Records – NIR3900-121 (12") (1993)
