= A Brand New Me (James "J.T." Taylor album) =

Studio album by James "J.T." Taylor
- Released: 2000
- Genres: R&B; Funk; Soul
- Length: 67:30
- Label: Jake Records/Taylor Made Records
- Producer: Marcus Quintanilla

James "J.T." Taylor chronology
Baby I'm Back (1993)	A Brand New Me (2000)

Professional ratings
Review scores
Source	Rating
AllMusic	link

A Brand New Me is the fourth solo album of James "J.T." Taylor. It includes the song "How", which was released as a maxi-single. This album was released by Interscope Records on June 6, 2000.

== Track listing ==
#	Title	Writer(s)	Length
1.	A Brand New Me	James "J.T." Taylor, Jay Lozada	5:05
2.	Mr. Young (Skit)	Billy Young, James "J.T." Taylor, Marcus Quintanilla, Jay Lozada	0:31
3.	Church Girl	James "J.T." Taylor, Marcus Quintanilla, Jay Lozada	4:10
4.	Don't Wanna Think About It	James "J.T." Taylor, Marcus Quintanilla, Jay Lozada	4:46
5.	Sweet Chocolate Baby	James "J.T." Taylor, Marcus Quintanilla, Jay Lozada	4:00
6.	All I Want	James "J.T." Taylor, Marcus Quintanilla, Jay Lozada	4:37
7.	Marry Me	James "J.T." Taylor, Jay Lozada	5:07
8.	Do You Know	James "J.T." Taylor, Marcus Quintanilla, Jay Lozada	3:42
9.	Sex On the Beach (Hip Hop 2000)	Ben Obi, James "J.T." Taylor, Jay Lozada	4:41
10.	Rubber Neckin'	James "J.T." Taylor, Marcus Quintanilla, Jay Lozada	4:48
11.	Crazy Boy	James "J.T." Taylor, Jay Lozada	3:51
12.	How	James "J.T." Taylor, Marcus Quintanilla, Jay Lozada	4:46
13.	All Said and Done	James "J.T." Taylor, Jay Lozada	5:26
14.	Brand New	Linda Creed, Thom Bell	5:10
15.	Sex On the Beach	James "J.T." Taylor, Jay Lozada	5:15
16.	New Millenium	James "J.T." Taylor, Marcus Quintanilla, Jay Lozada	4:09
17.	How (Instrumental)	James "J.T." Taylor, Marcus Quintanilla, Jay Lozada	4:48
