= The Force (Kool & the Gang album) =

Studio album by Kool and the Gang
- Released: December 1977
- Studios: De-Lite, Philadelphia, Pennsylvania
- Genre: Funk
- Length: 35:47
- Label: De-Lite
- Producers: Kool and the Gang

Kool and the Gang chronology
Open Sesame (1976)	The Force (1977)	Everybody's Dancin' (1978)

The Force is the ninth studio album by the funk band Kool and the Gang, released in 1977 on De-Lite Records. The album peaked at No. 33 on the US Billboard Top R&B/Hip-Hop Albums chart.

== Critical reception ==
Professional ratings
Review scores
Source	Rating
AllMusic	1.5/5 stars
The Encyclopedia of Popular Music	2/5 stars
The New Rolling Stone Record Guide	2/5 stars

The Globe and Mail wrote that "it's strange that to this day, black soul musicians are trying to say it better than Sly [Stone] did a decade ago and failing miserably." The Bay State Banner wrote that the album "lacked the excellent jive vocals, hot horn lines and boogie beat arrangements Kool made famous."

== Singles ==
"Slick Superchick" peaked at No. 19 on the US Billboard Hot R&B/Hip-Hop Songs chart.

== Track listing ==
Side 1
No.	Title	Writer(s)	Length
1.	"A Place in Space"	Ronald Bell, Kool & the Gang	4:49
2.	"Slick Superchick"	George Brown, Kool & the Gang	4:05
3.	"Just Be True"	Bell, Kool & the Gang	4:21
4.	"The Force"	Bell, Kool & the Gang	4:26

Side 2
No.	Title	Writer(s)	Length
1.	"Mighty, Mighty High"	Bell, Kool & the Gang	6:51
2.	"Oasis"	Bell, Kool & the Gang	6:06
3.	"Life's a Song"	Claydes Smith, Kool & the Gang	2:58
4.	"Free"	Bell, Kool & the Gang	2:11

== Personnel ==
- Ronald Bell – vocals, keyboards, clavinet, ARP synthesizer, percussion, alto saxophone, soprano saxophone, tenor saxophone, alto flute
- Kevin Lassiter – vocals, keyboards, clavinet, Minimoog, percussion
- George Brown – vocals, keyboards, clavinet, drums, percussion
- Dennis Thomas – vocals, keyboards, congas, percussion, alto saxophone
- Claydes Smith – vocals, acoustic guitar, electric guitar, percussion
- Robert "Kool" Bell – vocals, bass guitar, percussion
- Otha Nash – vocals, valve and slide trombones, tuba, percussion
- Robert Mickens – vocals, trumpet, flugelhorn, percussion

Additional personnel

- Jimmy J. Jordan – special effects
- Donald Boyce – voice (1, 4)
- Cynthia Huggins – lead vocals (6)
- Female vocals – Renee Connel, Cynthia Huggins, Joan Motley and Beverly Owens
- Arthur Capehart – trumpet (7)
- Strings on 6 & 7 – MFSB; arranged by John Davis

Production

- Producer – K&G Productions
- Arrangements – Kool and The Gang
- Co-Producer – George Brown
- Executive Producers – Ronald Bell and Claydes Smith
- Engineers – Terry Rosiello and Nils Salminen
- Mixing – Ronald Bell, Terry Rosiello and Nils Salminen.
- Recorded at De-Lite Recorded Sound Studio (Philadelphia, PA).
- Mastered at Sterling Sound (New York, NY).
- Cover Painting – DeEs Schwertberger

== Charts ==
Chart (1977)	Peak position
US Billboard Top Soul Albums	33
US Billboard 200	142
