= Caribbean Festival =

Single by Kool and the Gang

from the album Spirit of the Boogie
- B-side: "Caribbean Festival (Disco version)"
- Released: October 13, 1975
- Recorded: 1975
- Genre: Funk
- Length: 3:43
- Label: De-Lite
- Songwriters: Ronald Bell, Kool and the Gang
- Producer: Kool and the Gang

Kool and the Gang singles chronology
"Summer Madness" (1975)	"Caribbean Festival" (1975)	"Love and Understanding (Come Together)" (1976)

Audio video
- "Caribbean Festival" (album version) on YouTube

"Caribbean Festival" is a song recorded by Kool & the Gang for their 1975 studio album Spirit of the Boogie. It was produced by the band and with writing credited to Ronald Bell along with the group.

The song, issued as a single in 1975 by De-Lite Records, reached No. 6 on the US Billboard Hot Soul Singles chart.

== Critical reception ==
Daryl Easlea of the BBC proclaimed the song "takes a swaggering sunshine-kissed rhythm and stretches it out over nine minutes of joyous improvisation." Tony Green of Spin called the song "trance inducing." Record World said that the single "Caribbean Festival" "lived up to its title" and has "whirlwind rhythms." Billboard described it as being "mostly instrumental with pow- erhouse percussive beat and grabby horn leads, the vocal is just enough strategic yelling of key phrases to add to the total" and called it "a truly exciting single, great for dancing."

== Charts ==
Chart (1975)	Peak position
U.S. Billboard Hot 100	55
U.S. Billboard Hot Soul Singles	6
