= Special (Jimmy Cliff album) =

Studio album by Jimmy Cliff
- Released: 1982
- Genre: Reggae
- Label: Columbia
- Producer: Chris Kimsey

Jimmy Cliff chronology
Give the People What They Want (1981)	Special (1982)	The Power and the Glory (1983)

Special is an album by the Jamaican musician Jimmy Cliff, released in 1982. It was his first album for Columbia Records. Cliff supported the album with a North American tour coheadlined by Peter Tosh. He was disappointed with the commercial response to the album, claiming repeatedly that the tour would be his last. Special peaked at No. 186 on the Billboard 200. "Treat the Youths Right" was a significant hit in Jamaica.

== Production ==
The album was produced by Chris Kimsey. Ron Wood played guitar on a couple of the tracks; Sly Dunbar contributed on drums. "Roots Radical" is about respect for Jamaica and the culture that it has created. "Keep On Dancing" ironically advises listeners to continue to ignore social problems. Much of "Originator" consists of Cliff's vocals backed by hand drums.

== Critical reception ==
Professional ratings
Review scores
Source	Rating
AllMusic	3/5 stars
The Encyclopedia of Popular Music	2/5 stars
Omaha World-Herald	4/5 stars
The Rolling Stone Album Guide	2/5 stars

The Boston Globe called Special "a wonderful, lively blend of dance-reggae minus the excessive production and strained formula-pop that marred some of his albums from the past decade." The New York Daily News labeled Cliff "the spiritual force" of reggae, and noted the variety of instrumentation on the album. The Edmonton Journal opined that "beautifully clear, concise vocal readings abound, and the instrumental tracks are simply flawless."

The Salt Lake Tribune deemed Special "the finest album of reggae ... in quite some time," writing that "Cliff sounds fresh and revived." The Omaha World-Herald considered it "Cliff's brightest and catchiest album in a while." The Morning Call concluded that the album was "pleasant to the ear, but lacking in gut intensity."

AllMusic wrote that "Cliff takes the reggae form and adds a chorus of soothing yet soulful chorus, flute, fuzzy guitars and electronic keyboards, making for a fine album for those who prefer their reggae light, bouncy, and instantly catchy."

== Track listing ==
No.	Title	Length
1.	"Special"
2.	"Love Is All"
3.	"Peace Officer"
4.	"Treat the Youths Right"
5.	"Keep On Dancing"
6.	"Rub-a-Dub Partner"
7.	"Roots Radical"
8.	"Love Heights"
9.	"Originator"
10.	"Rock Children"
11.	"Where There Is Love"
