= Raindrops (Kool & the Gang song) =

Single by Kool & the Gang

from the album Sweat
- Released: 1989
- Genre: Funk
- Length: 3:45
- Label: Mercury
- Songwriter: Chuckii Booker
- Producer: Chuckii Booker

Kool & the Gang singles chronology
"Celebration" (remix) (1988)	"Raindrops" (1989)	"Never Give Up" (1989)

Audio video
- "Raindrops" on YouTube

"Raindrops" is a song recorded by R&B/funk band Kool & the Gang for their 1989 studio album Sweat. It was written and produced by Chuckii Booker.

Released as a single, the song reached No. 27 on the US Billboard Hot Soul Singles chart, No. 25 on the Japanese pop singles chart and No. 42 on the German pop singles chart.

== Charts ==
=== Weekly charts ===
Chart (1989)	Peak position
Italy Airplay (Music & Media)	1
