= Beat System =

German Eurodance project

Beat System was a German Eurodance project in the mid-1990s.

Beat System was a duo of rapper Neal Antone Dyer (Tony T), born in London in 1971, and various female vocalists (Martina Sres, Patty, Jay Babe and G. Fascina). They released five singles, under the Intercord label. Their first single, "Dance Romance" was released in 1994, in two versions (called chapters). The vocals were done by Patty. It was arranged and written by C. Kowatsch and Wormit, and mixed by Richard Taylor.

"Stay with Me" was written and produced by Axel Breitung and C. Kowatsch, produced by Black Nero, and released in 1995. The following singles were produced by C. Kowatsch, Wormit and Ulrich Dienes. In March 1996, a version of Kool & the Gang's "Fresh" was released, with raps by Tony T and the vocals of G. Fascina, including a B-side titled "Call My Name". The single reached number 32 on the German singles chart. A summer-remixes CD was released in June. "Reggae Night", a cover of the Jimmy Cliff song was then released, which reached No. 93 in Germany.

== Discography ==
=== Albums ===
- Refreshiator (1997)

=== Singles ===
Year	Single	Peak chart positions					Album
Year	Single	AUT	BEL (Vl)	BEL (FLA)	FRA	GER	Album
1994	"Dance Romance"	—	—	—	—	—	Non-album single
1994	"Dance Romance Chapter Two"	—	—	—	—	—	Non-album single
1995	"Stay with Me"	—	—	—	—	—	Non-album single
1996	"Fresh"	29	18	37	15	32	Refreshiator
1996	"Reggae Night"	—	—	36	—	93	Refreshiator
1996	"What's Going On (In Your Mind)"	—	—	—	—	—	Refreshiator
"—" denotes a title that did not chart
