= Wild and Peaceful (Kool & the Gang album) =

Studio album by Kool & the Gang
- Released: September 1973
- Recorded: April–May 1973
- Studios: Mediasound, New York City
- Genres: Funk; R&B; jazz
- Length: 37:45
- Label: De-Lite
- Producers: Kool & the Gang

Kool & the Gang chronology
Good Times (1972)	Wild and Peaceful (1973)	Light of Worlds (1974)

Singles from Wild and Peaceful
- 1. "Funky Stuff" Released: September 1973; 2. "Jungle Boogie" Released: November 24, 1973; 3. "Hollywood Swinging" Released: April 6, 1974

Professional ratings
Review scores
Source	Rating
AllMusic	4.5/5 stars
BBC	(favourable)
Rolling Stone	(mixed)
Stereo Review	(favourable)

Wild and Peaceful is the fourth studio album released by the funk band Kool & the Gang. It was their commercial breakthrough. It was released in 1973 and was hugely successful on the Billboard R&B chart, reaching No. 6 and charting for 36 weeks. It also reached No. 33 on the Pop charts, making it the band's first entry into that chart's Top 40. The album spawned the band's first three Top 10 singles. "Funky Stuff" reached No. 5 R&B/No. 29 Pop. The hugely popular track "Jungle Boogie" soared to No. 2 R&B and No. 4 on the Billboard Hot 100, and "Hollywood Swinging" topped the Billboard Hot Soul Singles in June 1974 while reaching No. 6 Pop. The latter two singles both sold over a million copies and were certified Gold by the RIAA. The album was certified Gold.

Record World said the lead single "Funky Stuff" provides "funk & fun from the gang and includes lotsa percussion and whistles."

== Track listing ==
All tracks are written by Kool & the Gang, with co-writing credits noted below.

Side onr
No.	Title	Writer(s)	Length
1.	"Funky Stuff"	George Brown	3:00
2.	"More Funky Stuff"		2:50
3.	"Jungle Boogie"		3:03
4.	"Heaven at Once"	Ronald Bell	5:01
5.	"Hollywood Swinging"	Rick Westfield	4:36

Side two
No.	Title	Writer(s)	Length
6.	"This Is You, This Is Me"	Brown	5:23
7.	"Life Is What You Make It"	Dennis "Dee Tee" Thomas	3:53
8.	"Wild and Peaceful"	Ronald Bell	9:26
Total length:			37:45

== Personnel ==
- Robert "Kool" Bell – bass, vocals
- George "Funky" Brown – drums, percussion, vocals
- Ricky West – electric piano, vocals
- Clay Smith – lead guitar
- Dennis "Dee Tee" Thomas – alto saxophone, flute, congas, vocals
- Ronald Bell – tenor and soprano saxophones, vocals
- Robert "Spike" Mickens – trumpet, vocals

Additional personnel

- Don Boyce – backing vocals (3)
- Rory Bell – backing vocals (4)
- Tomorrow’s Edition (Jerome Gourdine, Aaron Mathis and Wesley Thomas) – backing vocals (6)

Production

- Produced and Arranged by Kool & the Gang
- Engineers – Harvey Goldberg and Jeff Lesser
- Recorded at Mediasound Studios (New York, NY)
- Cover Artwork – Joseph Askew
- Album Design – Richard Askew

== Certifications ==
Region	Certification	Certified units/sales
United States (RIAA)	Gold	500,000^{^}
^{^} Shipments figures based on certification alone.
