= Love & Understanding =

Studio album by Kool & the Gang
- Released: March 1976
- Recorded: 1975
- Genre: Funk
- Length: 41:26
- Label: De-Lite
- Producer: Kool and the Gang

Kool & the Gang chronology
Spirit of the Boogie (1975)	Love & Understanding (1976)	Open Sesame (1976)

Love & Understanding is the seventh studio album by the funk band Kool & the Gang, released in 1976. The album had mild success. Three tracks, "Hollywood Swinging", "Summer Madness" and "Universal Sound" were recorded live at the Rainbow Theatre in London, England.

== Critical reception ==
Professional ratings
Review scores
Source	Rating
AllMusic	3.5/5 stars

Record World said of the title track that "Kool's combination of chanting vocals, horns and electronics forms a patented style all his own."

== Track listing ==
Side one
No.	Title	Writer(s)	Length
1.	"Love & Understanding"	Claydes Smith, Khalis Bayyan, Kool & the Gang	7:51
2.	"Sugar"	George Brown, Kool & the Gang	5:37
3.	"Do It Right Now"	Otha Nash, Kool & the Gang	3:55
4.	"Cosmic Energy"	Smith, Bayyan, Kool & the Gang	3:11

Side two
No.	Title	Writer(s)	Length
1.	"Hollywood Swinging" (live)	Ricky West, Kool & the Gang	5:40
2.	"Summer Madness" (live)	Alton Taylor, Robert "Spike" Mickens, Kool & the Gang	8:01
3.	"Universal Sound" (live)	Bayyan, Kool & the Gang	4:04
4.	"Come Together"	Smith, Bayyan, Kool & the Gang	2:48

== Personnel ==
- Bass, vocals – Robert "Kool" Bell
- Drums, percussion, vocals – George Brown
- Guitar – Claydes Smith, Kevin Bell
- Piano – Ricky West
- Alto saxophone – Peter Duarte
- Alto saxophone, vocals, flute, congas – Dennis Thomas
- Tenor saxophone – Dennis White
- Tenor saxophone, alto flute, piano, vocals, ARP synthesizer – Ronald Bell
- Trombone – Ray Wright
- Trombone, vocals – Otha Nash
- Trumpet – Spike Mickens
- Trumpet, flugelhorn, vocals – Larry Gitten
- Backing vocals – Don Boyce, Royal Jackson, Something Sweet, Tomorrow's Edition

Production

- Arranged and Produced by Kool & the Gang
- Executive Producer – Khalis Bayyan
- Engineers – B. Clearwater, Harvey Goldberg and Terry Rosiello.
- Mixed by Terry Rosiellio
- Mastered by Earl Williams
- Design – Frank Daniel
- Photography – Simon De Cherpitel and Bill Peronneau

== Charts ==
=== Weekly charts ===
Chart (1976)	Peak position
US Billboard 200	68
US Top R&B/Hip-Hop Albums (Billboard)	9

=== Year-end charts ===
Chart (1976)	Position
US Top R&B/Hip-Hop Albums (Billboard)	43
