= Music Is the Message =

Studio album by Kool & the Gang
- Released: July 1972
- Recorded: 1971–1972
- Genres: Funk; soul; R&B
- Length: 34:13
- Label: De-Lite
- Producers: Kool & the Gang

Kool & the Gang chronology
Live at PJ's (1971)	Music Is the Message (1972)	Good Times (1972)

Professional ratings
Review scores
Source	Rating
AllMusic	3/5 stars
The Encyclopedia of Popular Music	2/5 stars
(The New) Rolling Stone Album Guide	3.5/5 stars

Music Is the Message is the second studio album, and the fourth overall album, by the funk band Kool & the Gang. It was released in 1972.

The album peaked at No. 25 on the Billboard Soul LPs chart.

== Track listing ==
All tracks are written by Kool & the Gang; except where indicated.

Side 1
No.	Title	Length
1.	"Music Is the Message"	5:18
2.	"Electric Frog (Part 1)"	3:43
3.	"Electric Frog (Part 2)"	3:02
4.	"Soul Vibrations"	4:39

Side 2
No.	Title	Writer(s)	Length
1.	"Love the Life You Live (Part 1)"	Kool & the Gang, Gene Redd	3:01
2.	"Love the Life You Live (Part 2)"	Kool & the Gang, Gene Redd	2:48
3.	"Stop, Look, Listen (To Your Heart)"	Thom Bell, Linda Creed	3:26
4.	"Blowin' with the Wind"		2:31
5.	"Funky Granny"	Kool & the Gang, Gene Redd	5:55

== Personnel ==
- Dennis "D. T." Thomas – alto saxophone, vocals, flute, percussion
- Ronald Bell – tenor saxophone, vocals, alto flute
- Robert "Spike" Mickens – trumpet, vocals, flugelhorn, percussion
- Claydes Smith – guitar
- Rick West – pianos, ARP synthesizer, vocals
- Robert "Kool" Bell – bass, vocals
- George Brown – drums, percussion, vocals

Additional personnel

- Assunta Dell'Aquila – harp
