= The Vernon Morning Star =

Canadian newspaper in British Columbia

The Morning Star
- Type: Weekly newspaper
- Format: Broadsheet
- Owner(s): Black Press
- Publisher: Keith Currie
- Editor: Jennifer Smith
- Founded: June 1988
- Headquarters: 4407 25th Avenue; Vernon, British Columbia; V1T 1P5
- Circulation: 25,520 (as of October 2022)
- ISSN: 1719-3664
- Website: vernonmorningstar.com

The Vernon Morning Star is a weekly newspaper in Vernon, British Columbia. It publishes Thursday and is owned by Black Press.

== History ==
The newspaper was founded in June 1988 and has been owned by Black Press since December 1988.

== See also ==
- List of newspapers in Canada
