= Platinum Hook =

American funk band

- Also known as: The Soul Dukes
- Origin: New York City
- Genres: Funk; R&B; soul
- Years active: 1977–1984
- Labels: Motown; RCA
- Past members: Stephen Daniels; Tina Renee Stanford; Robert Douglas; Elisha "Skipp" Ingram; Victor Jones; Robin David Corley; Glenn Wallace; Kevin Jasper

Platinum Hook was an American funk band. They had a minor hit in the UK with "Standing On The Verge".

== Bio ==
Originally 'The Soul Dukes', after vocalist Tina Stanford joined the band in 1976, the band changed their name to Platinum Hook. The Soul Dukes were led by vocalist and percussionist Stephen Daniels. Early members were Robin Corley, Victor Jones, Bobby Douglas, and Glenn Wallace. It was after Tina joined the band that they secured a recording contract with Motown. The Hook went on to record three albums with Motown. "Standing on the Verge (Of Gettin' It On)" was a hit in the UK and made the Billboard charts in the U.S. After leaving Motown, they signed with RCA and released an EP, 'Watching You', in 1983. The Hook's first, self-titled album was recently remastered and re-released in Japan, the Netherlands, and the UK, and is available for purchase as an import on Amazon and other music outlets.

Despite much success playing live, Platinum Hook did not have much success in the record industry. Platinum Hook's horn section compared to that of Earth, Wind and Fire, and the vocalists and rhythm section were top-notch. The band's musicianship guaranteed they always had work, and they were on the bill with such greats as The Commodores, Kool and the Gang, Sister Sledge (for whom they also played backup), and many others. In the early 1980s, they teamed up with Italian superstar Loredana Bertè for a tour of Italy and the States.

Platinum Hook had a residency at The Cellar club in New York City that lasted from 1977 to 1984. When not touring, they could be found blowing the roof off the packed nightclub. The Hook toured heavily in the States, including playing the Kool Jazz Fest in 1978, 1979, and the early 80's. In 1979, they were on the bill at the famed Apollo Theater with the Delfonics and the Joneses for a Billboard Magazine show.

Platinum Hook was managed by Benjamin Ashburn who signed them up along with another act Three Ounces of Love in 1977.

They released their self-titled Motown album in 1978. The jazz and R&B styling was similar to that of Earth Wind & Fire. They played at venues like The Cellar in New York City in 1977 and the Kool Jazz Festival in June 1978. Other acts to appear there were The Commodores, LTD and comedian James Wesley Jackson. Brick was to play but pulled out. In May 1979, they started a 3-night engagement at the Crazy Quilt.

In the early 1980s they worked on an album for Italian singer Loredana Bertè.

Their manager Ashburn who also managed The Commodores, died of a heart attack in 1982 at age 54.

== Releases ==
Albums

- Platinum Hook, (Motown – M7-899R1) (1978)
- It's Time, (Motown – M7-918R1) (1979)
- Ecstacy Paradise, Unreleased
- Watching You, Mini Album, (RCA Victor – MLF1-8506) (1983)

Singles

- "Standing On The Verge (Of Getting It On)" / "Til' I Met You" (TMG 1115) (1979)
- "Give Me Time To Say" / "Standing On The Verge" (Motown M 00029 DI) (1979)
- "Words Of Love" / "Ecstasy Paradise" (Motown M 1498F) (1980)

== Group membership ==
- Stephen Daniels (drums, percussion, lead and background vocals)
- Tina Renee Stanford (percussion, lead and background vocals)
- Robert Douglas (keyboards and lead and background vocals)
- Elisha 'Skipp' Ingram (bass, lead and background vocals)
- Victor Jones (guitar and background vocals)
- Robin David Corley (saxophone, flute, bird calls and lead and background vocals)
- Glenn Wallace (trombone and background vocals)
- Kevin Jasper (trumpet, percussion, lead and background vocals)

Jean Bryant who was the mother of Steve Daniels contributed some of the background vocals and percussion duties to the debut album.
