= State of Affairs (album) =

Studio album by Kool & the Gang
- Released: July 3, 1996
- Recorded: December 1995–April 1996
- Studios: The Audio Lab (Montclair, New Jersey); Soundtrack Studios (New York City, New York)
- Genres: Funk, R&B
- Length: 55:45
- Label: Curb
- Producers: James "J.T." Taylor; Khalis Bayyan

Kool & the Gang chronology
Unite (1992)	State of Affairs (1996)	Gangland (2001)

Professional ratings
Review scores
Source	Rating
Allmusic	1.5/5 stars
News & Observer	(favourable)
Buffalo News	3.5/5 stars

State of Affairs is the twentieth studio album by the band Kool & the Gang, released in 1996 following a four-year gap between albums. It marked the return of James "J.T." Taylor as the lead singer since 1986's album Forever.

== Critical reception ==
Dan LeRoy of AllMusic noted "With former lead singer James 'J.T.' Taylor rejoining his old band after a break of several years, hopes were high among Kool & the Gang fans that the reunited group could rejoin the ranks of hitmakers once again with State of Affairs. But the painful state of affairs revealed on this disappointing, sterile-sounding effort was that the Gang were trying too hard to show they could hang with the then-current batch of high-tech R&B chart-toppers."

== Singles ==
The single, "In the Hood" reached No. 27 on the UK R&B Singles chart.

== Track listing ==
All tracks are written by Kahlis Bayyan and James "J.T." Taylor, except where indicated.

No.	Title	Writer(s)	Length
1.	"Salute to the Ladies"		3:25
2.	"In the Hood"	Bayyan, Taylor, Kool & the Gang	4:50
3.	"Color Line"		5:05
4.	"Second Thoughts"		5:12
5.	"Crabs in a Barrel"		4:44
6.	"Woman, Lover, Friend"		4:55
7.	"Game of Love"	Chuckie Howard, Bayyan, Taylor	4:25
8.	"'90s News"		0:58
9.	"Life in the '90s"		5:51
10.	"Friends"		6:00
11.	"My Body"		5:05
12.	"Reunited"	George "Funky" Brown, Bayyan, Taylor	5:14

== Personnel ==
Kool & the Gang

- James "J.T." Taylor – lead vocals, backing vocals (1–6, 8–11), music programming (11), drum programming (11), sequencing (11)
- Curtis "Fitz" Williams – organ (1), Moog synthesizer (4), keyboards (7), programming (7), sequencing (7)
- Khalis Bayyan – music programming (1–6, 8–11), drum programming (1–6, 8–11), sequencing (1–11), alto saxophone (1–3, 5, 8, 9, 11), tenor saxophone (1–3, 5, 8–11), keyboards (7), programming (7), additional programming (12)
- Charles Smith – guitars (1, 4–6, 11)
- George "Funky" Brown – music programming (12), drum programming (12), sequencing (12)
- Dennis "Dee Tee" Thomas – alto saxophone (5)
- Clifford Adams – trombone (5)

Additional musicians

- Rashad Muhammad – digital programming (1–6, 8–12)
- Paul Sinclair – acoustic piano (6)
- Robert Meeks – keyboards (12)
- Craig Hardy – keyboards (13)
- Daryl Pediford – additional sampled guitar (1)
- Shawn McQuiller – additional sampled guitar (1)
- Amir-Salaam Bayyan – guitars (2, 6, 8, 9, 11)
- Jeff Catania – guitars (3, 10), drums (12)
- Richie Tozzi – guitars (3)
- Kirk Lyons – bass (10, 12)
- Paul Kayk – drum programming (6), additional drum programming (12)
- Rasheed Bell – backing vocals (2)

=== Production ===
- Stephan Galfas – executive producer, management for T.E. Savage, Inc.
- Khalis Bayyan – producer, music arrangements (5, 7, 10, 11)
- James "J.T." Taylor – producer, music arrangements (5, 10, 11), vocal arrangements (5, 10, 11), cover concept
- The Bagheads (Craig Hardy and Martin Neary) – additional production (13)
- Kip Kaplan – production coordinator
- Tia Sinclair – coordinator (1–7, 10–12)
- Marc Gregory – cover concept
- Eric Zim – cover and J-card design
- Tom Schierlitz – photography
- Fiona Saunders Reece – European management

Technical credits

- Rashad Muhammad – digital editing (1–6, 8–12)
- Kendal Stubbs – recording, mixing (3, 4)
- Ben Arrindell – mixing (1, 6, 7, 10–12), mix assistant (2–5, 8, 9), additional engineer (12)
- Stephan Galfas – mixing (1, 6, 7, 10–12)
- Andy Jackson – mixing (2–5, 8, 9)
- The Bagheads – remixing (13)
- Martin "Nobby" Neary – mix engineer (13)
- Jeff Toone – additional engineer (1, 4)
- Warren Riker – additional engineer (2, 3, 8, 9)
- Vittorio Zammarano – additional engineer (5, 6, 11, 12)
- Khalis Bayyan – additional engineer (7)
- Wade Thoren – mix assistant (7, 11, 12)
