= Master of the Game (James "J.T." Taylor album) =

Studio album by James "J.T." Taylor
- Released: 1989
- Genres: R&B, soul
- Length: 43:22
- Label: MCA
- Producers: James "J.T." Taylor, Dennis Matkosky, Eumir Deodato, Narada Michael Walden, Walter Afanasieff

James "J.T." Taylor chronology
Master of the Game (1989)	Feel the Need (1991)

Professional ratings
Review scores
Source	Rating
AllMusic	3/5 stars

Master of the Game is the debut solo studio album by American R&B recording artist James "J.T." Taylor, a former member of Kool & the Gang. It was released by MCA Records in 1989 and peaked at No. 77 on the Billboard R&B chart.

== Track listing ==
#	Title	Writer(s)	Length
1.	"Sister Rosa"	James "J.T." Taylor	4:02
2.	"8 Days a Week"	James "J.T." Taylor, Dennis Matkosky	3:52
3.	"The House That Jack Built"	James "J.T." Taylor	5:29
4.	"Bring Back the Night"	James "J.T." Taylor	4:44
5.	"Master of the Game"	Dennis Matkosky, Paul Gordon	4:33
6.	"Kiss My Face"	James "J.T." Taylor	4:30
7.	"Lay Awake at Night"	James "J.T." Taylor	4:56
8.	"Girl You're Mine Now"	Jeff Paris	4:28
9.	"Romancia"	James "J.T." Taylor	4:42
10.	"All I Want Is Forever"	Diane Warren	4:27
11.	"The Promised Land"	Bobby Caldwell, Paul Gordon	4:04
