= Feel the Need (James "J.T." Taylor album) =

Studio album by James "J.T." Taylor
- Released: 1991
- Genre: Soul
- Label: MCA
- Producers: James "J.T." Taylor, Dr. Ross, Robert Meeks, Simon Law, Barry J. Eastmond, Dunn Pearson, Jr., Vassal Benford

James "J.T." Taylor chronology
Master of the Game (1989)	Feel the Need (1991)	Baby I'm Back (1993)

Feel the Need is the second solo studio album by the American musician James "J.T." Taylor, released in 1991. The album includes the hits "Long Hot Summer Night" and "Heart to Heart" (a duet with Stephanie Mills).

== Critical reception ==
Professional ratings
Review scores
Source	Rating
AllMusic	4/5 stars

The Orlando Sentinel wrote that Taylor "has the savvy to incorporate today's high-tech gadgetry into his soulful sound without letting it dominate him."

== Track listing ==
#	Title	Writer(s)	Length
1.	Long Hot Summer Night	James "J.T." Taylor, Ross Anderson, Simon Law	5:46
2.	Feel the Need	Simon Law, James "J.T." Taylor, Ross Anderson	5:39
3.	Interlude	-	0:41
4.	Work with Me	James "J.T." Taylor, Robert Meeks	5:22
5.	Follow Me	James "J.T." Taylor, Robert Meeks	4:37
6.	Interlude	-	0:41
7.	Let's Make Love (Like There'sNo Tomorrow)	James "J.T." Taylor, Barry J. Eastmond	5:01
8.	Heart to Heart	James "J.T." Taylor, Barry J. Eastmond	5:08
9.	That's My Girl	Ron Spearman, Vassal Benford	5:48
10.	Twice	Robert Meeks, James "J.T." Taylor	4:25
11.	The Way That You Love Me	Robert Meeks, James "J.T." Taylor	4:01
12.	One Night	James "J.T." Taylor, Barry J. Eastmond	4:55
13.	Interlude	-	0:41
14.	The Power of Love	Joseph Porrell, Dunn Pearson Jr., James "J.T." Taylor	5:22
15.	Be My Lover Tonight	James "J.T." Taylor, Barry J. Eastmond	5:14
16.	Long Hot Summer Night (12" Vocal Version)	James "J.T." Taylor, Ross Anderson, Simon Law	6:50
