= Cherish (Kool & the Gang song) =

1985 single by Kool & the Gang

- US single picture sleeve

Single by Kool & the Gang

from the album Emergency
- B-side: "Cherish" (instrumental); "Joanna"
- Released: May 1985
- Length: 4:47 (album); 3:58 (single)
- Label: De-Lite
- Songwriters: Robert Earl Bell; Ronald Nathan Bell; James L Bonnefond; George Melvin Brown; Claydes Charles Smith; James "J.T." Taylor; Curtis "Fitz" Williams
- Producers: Jim Bonnefond; Ronald Bell; Kool & the Gang

Kool & the Gang singles chronology
"Fresh" (1984)	"Cherish" (1985)	"Emergency" (1985)

Music video
- "Cherish" on YouTube

"Cherish" is a song by American R&B band Kool & the Gang, released on a single in May 1985. It was the third single released from the band's 16th studio album, Emergency. The song is a romantic ballad that proved to be extremely popular when it was released and has since been a wedding song staple of sorts.

"Cherish" was certified gold by the Recording Industry Association of America (RIAA) and held the number-one position on the US Billboard Adult Contemporary chart for six weeks; it would ultimately rank as the biggest adult contemporary song of 1985. It also peaked at number two on the Billboard Hot 100. In the United Kingdom, the song reached number four on the UK Singles Chart and remained there for three weeks.

== Charts ==
=== Weekly charts ===
Chart (1985)	Peak position
Australia (Kent Music Report)	8
Austria (Ö3 Austria Top 40)	3
Belgium (Ultratop 50 Flanders)	3
Canada Retail Singles (The Record)	2
Canada Top Singles (RPM)	1
France (SNEP)	11
Ireland (IRMA)	6
Netherlands (Dutch Top 40)	4
Netherlands (Single Top 100)	3
Sweden (Sverigetopplistan)	19
Switzerland (Schweizer Hitparade)	2
UK Singles (Official Charts)	4
US Billboard Hot 100	2
US Adult Contemporary (Billboard)	1
US Hot Black Singles (Billboard)	1
West Germany (GfK)	5

=== Year-end charts ===
Chart (1985)	Rank
Australia (Kent Music Report)	56
Belgium (Ultratop)	19
Canada Top Singles (RPM)	6
Netherlands (Single Top 100)	20
Netherlands (Dutch Top 40)	14
Switzerland (Schweizer Hitparade)	18
UK Singles (OCC)	23
US Billboard Hot 100	17
US Adult Contemporary (Billboard)	1
US Hot Black Singles (Billboard)	13
West Germany (Media Control)	32

== Certifications ==
Region	Certification	Certified units/sales
Canada (Music Canada)	Platinum	100,000^{^}
United Kingdom (BPI)	Silver	250,000^{^}
United States (RIAA)	Gold	500,000^{^}
^{^} Shipments figures based on certification alone.

== Pappa Bear version ==
"Cherish"

Single by Pappa Bear featuring Van der Toorn

from the album What's My Name?
- Released: October 13, 1997
- Length: 3:52
- Label: Universal
- Songwriters: Ronald Bell, James Taylor, Kool & the Gang
- Producers: Bülent Aris, Toni Cottura

Pappa Bear featuring Van der Toorn singles chronology
"Cherish" (1997)	"When the Rain Begins to Fall" (1998)

Samples and lyrics from this song were used in Pappa Bear's song of the same name in 1997. This version was largely unknown in America, where the music video was set, but experienced significant chart success in Europe and Australia, peaking at number one in New Zealand for three weeks and charting within the top five in Austria, Germany, the Netherlands and Switzerland.

=== Track listing ===
CD maxi

1. "Cherish" (Radio) – 3:52
2. "Cherish" (Extended) – 5:37
3. "One 4 Da Money" – 5:02
4. "Xtra Large" – 4:10

=== Charts ===
==== Weekly charts ====
Chart (1997–1998)	Peak position
Australia (ARIA)	7
Austria (Ö3 Austria Top 40)	2
Belgium (Ultratop 50 Flanders)	39
Europe (Eurochart Hot 100)	6
Germany (GfK)	2
Netherlands (Dutch Top 40)	5
Netherlands (Single Top 100)	4
New Zealand (Recorded Music NZ)	1
Norway (VG-lista)	7
Scottish Singles Sales (Official Charts)	84
Sweden (Sverigetopplistan)	20
Switzerland (Schweizer Hitparade)	2
UK Singles (Official Charts)	47

==== Year-end charts ====
Chart (1997)	Position
Europe (Eurochart Hot 100)	97
Germany (Media Control)	24

Chart (1998)	Position
Australia (ARIA)	41
Austria (Ö3 Austria Top 40)	37
Germany (Media Control)	71
Netherlands (Single Top 100)	57
New Zealand (RIANZ)	4
Switzerland (Schweizer Hitparade)	31

=== Certifications ===
Region	Certification	Certified units/sales
Australia (ARIA)	Gold	35,000^{^}
Austria (IFPI Austria)	Gold	25,000^{*}
Germany (BVMI)	Platinum	500,000^{^}
New Zealand (RMNZ)	Platinum	10,000^{*}
Switzerland (IFPI Switzerland)	Gold	25,000^{^}
^{*} Sales figures based on certification alone.^{^} Shipments figures based on certification alone.

== Other cover versions ==
- In 2021, Frank Farian and his daughter Yanina recorded a cover version titled "Cherish The Life".

== See also ==
- List of number-one adult contemporary singles of 1985 (U.S.)
- List of number-one R&B singles of 1985 (U.S.)
