= Reggae Night =

Single by Jimmy Cliff

from the album The Power and the Glory
- Released: 1983
- Length: 5:20
- Label: Columbia (North America); CBS Records (Europe)
- Songwriters: Amir Bayyan; La Toya Jackson
- Producers: Jim Bonnefond; Ronald Bell; Amir Bayyan

Music video
- "Reggae Night" on YouTube

"Reggae Night" is a 1983 single by reggae artist Jimmy Cliff, from his album The Power and the Glory. It was released by Columbia Records in the US, Canada and Mexico and in most European countries on CBS Records. Written by Amir Bayyan and La Toya Jackson, it became an international hit for Jimmy Cliff.

== Track listing ==
1. "Reggae Night" – 3:58
2. "Reggae Night" (instrumental) – 3:58

== Charts ==
=== Weekly charts ===
Weekly chart performance for "Reggae Night"
Chart (1983–1984)	Peak position
Belgium (Ultratop 50 Flanders)	5
Belgium (VRT Top 30 Flanders)	4
Canada Adult Contemporary (RPM)	26
Canada Top Singles (RPM)	40
Colombia (AP)	4
Netherlands (Dutch Top 40)	3
Netherlands (Single Top 100)	6
New Zealand (Recorded Music NZ)	1
South Africa (Springbok Radio)	2
US Billboard Hot Black Singles	89
West Germany (GfK)	35

=== Year-end charts ===
Year-end chart performance for "Reggae Night"
Chart (1984)	Position
Belgium (Ultratop 50 Flanders)	91
France (IFOP)	11

== Cover versions ==
The song has been covered by a number of artists, including La Toya Jackson, who co-wrote the song, on her album No Relations. German Eurodance group Beat System released their version in 1996 which reached the top 40 in Belgium.

== See also ==
- List of number-one singles from the 1980s (New Zealand)
