= Baby I'm Back (album) =

Studio album by James "J.T." Taylor
- Released: 1993
- Genres: R&B, funk, soul
- Length: 56:50
- Label: MCA
- Producers: James "J.T." Taylor, Khalis Bayyan, Marcus O., Robert Meeks, Bobby Wooten, Simon Law

James "J.T." Taylor chronology
Feel the Need (1991)	Baby I'm Back (1993)	A Brand New Me (2000)

Professional ratings
Review scores
Source	Rating
AllMusic	link

Baby I'm Back is the third solo album of James "J.T." Taylor. The album includes hits "Baby I'm Back" and "Prove My Love". This album was released by MCA Records in 1993.

== Track listing ==
#	Title	Writer(s)	Length
1.	Baby I'm Back	James "J.T." Taylor, Nija Battle, Khalis Bayyan	5:05
2.	Love Thing	Robert Meeks, James "J.T." Taylor, Marcus Quintanilla, Paul Mitchell	4:03
3.	Next 2 U	Khalis Bayyan, James "J.T." Taylor	5:08
4.	Dreamin'	Robert Meeks, Paul Mitchell, James "J.T." Taylor, Marcus Quintanilla	4:26
5.	You've Got the Flavor	James "J.T." Taylor, Paul Mitchell, Robert Meeks, Marcus Quintanilla	4:28
6.	Prove My Love	James "J.T." Taylor, Bobby Wooten	6:13
7.	Some Kind of Woman	James "J.T." Taylor	4:34
8.	I Wanna Know	James "J.T." Taylor, Bobby Wooten	5:58
9.	Under My Wings	Bobby Wooten, James "J.T." Taylor	5:21
10.	Feel the Need	James "J.T." Taylor, Ross Anderson, Simon Law	6:25
11.	Baby I'm Back (Acapiano)	James "J.T." Taylor, Nija Battle, Khalis Bayyan	5:09
