= Big Fun (Kool & the Gang song) =

Single by Kool & the Gang

from the album As One
- B-side: "No Show"
- Released: August 1982
- Genre: Soul jazz, post-disco
- Length: 3:48 (single version); 5:00 (album version)
- Label: De-Lite
- Songwriters: Ronald Nathan Bell; Claydes Charles Smith; George Melvin Brown; James "J.T." Taylor; Robert Spike Mickens; Robert Earl Bell; Eumir Deodato

Kool & the Gang singles chronology
"No Show" (1982)	"Big Fun" (1982)	"Let's Go Dancin' (Ooh La, La, La)" (1982)

Music video
- "Big Fun" on YouTube

"Big Fun" is a 1982 song by the American band Kool & the Gang. It was originally released on their As One album.

"Big Fun" reached number 14 on the UK Singles Chart and number 21 in the US. The song peaked at number six on the US R&B chart published by Billboard in late 1982.

== Charts ==
Chart performance for "Big Fun"
Chart (1982)	Peak position
Belgium (Ultratop 50 Flanders)	29
Ireland (IRMA)	16
Netherlands (Single Top 100)	30
New Zealand (Recorded Music NZ)	40
UK Singles (OCC)	14
US Billboard Hot 100	21
US Billboard Hot Black Singles	6
West Germany (GfK)	40

== See also ==
- List of post-disco artists and songs
