= Summer Madness (instrumental) =

1974 song by Kool & the Gang

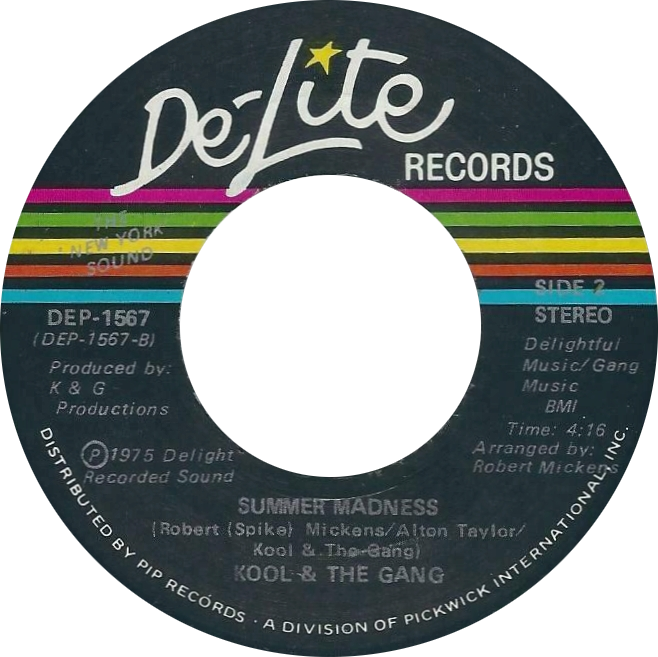
- Side two of US single "Spirit of the Boogie"

Single by Kool & the Gang

from the album Light of Worlds
- A-side: "Spirit of the Boogie" (Nor. Am.)
- Released: September 1975
- Recorded: 1974
- Genre: Jazz-funk; R&B
- Length: 4:16
- Label: De-Lite
- Songwriters: Robert "Spike" Mickens, Alton Taylor, Kool & the Gang

Kool & the Gang singles chronology
"Spirit of the Boogie" (1975)	"Summer Madness" (1975)	"Caribbean Festival" (1975)

Audio video
- "Summer Madness" on YouTube

"Summer Madness" is an instrumental song by American R&B band Kool & the Gang, released on their 1974 album Light of Worlds. It reached number 35 on the Billboard Hot 100 and number 36 on the Hot Soul Singles charts. It has subsequently become one of the most sampled R&B compositions of all time, and was re-released and reissued as a CD and cassette single by Epic Records in 1996. As of 2018, over 145 recordings had sampled it.

== Composition ==
The song's most recognizable aural signature is the 4-octave ascent from F♯_{3} to F♯_{7} on an ARP 2600 played by Ronald Bell.

== In popular culture ==
"Summer Madness" has been used in various media, and has been prominently used as a sample in many pieces of hip-hop music since the 1980s. Notable uses of the song in media include:

- It appears in the background of a scene in the 1976 film Rocky.
- The track was sampled in the 1996 song "A Girl Like You", as performed by Aaliyah and Treach, from the former's second album One in a Million.
- It appears in Grand Theft Auto: Vice City on the in-game "Fever 105" radio station.
- It is used in a 2006 Nike shoe commercial featuring LeBron James.
- It appears in the first season second episode "Hooper" of the 2021 Netflix series Last Chance U: Basketball.
- American psychedelic band Khruangbin covered the track on their 2020 remix album Late Night Tales: Khruangbin.
- It appears in the Soundtrack of the 2006 video game: Tony Hawk's Project 8

== Charts ==
Chart (1975)	Peak position
US Billboard Hot 100	35
US Record World Singles Chart	34

== Certifications ==
Region	Certification	Certified units/sales
United States (RIAA)	Gold	500,000^{‡}
^{‡} Sales+streaming figures based on certification alone.
