= Misled (Kool & the Gang song) =

Single by Kool & the Gang

from the album Emergency
- B-side: "Ladies' Night" (remix); "Rollin'"
- Released: November 2, 1984
- Genre: Dance-rock; pop rock; disco; rock
- Length: 4:56 (album version); 4:06 (single version); 5:38 (12" version)
- Label: De-Lite
- Songwriters: James Taylor; Ronald Bell; Kool & the Gang
- Producers: Jim Bonnefond; Kool & the Gang; Ronald Bell

Kool & the Gang singles chronology
"(When You Say You Love Somebody) In the Heart" (1984)	"Misled" (1984)	"Fresh" (1984)

Music video
- "Misled" on YouTube

"Misled" is a 1984 song by American R&B group Kool & the Gang taken from their album, Emergency. The song takes influence from rock and pop music. It reached number 10 on the US Billboard Hot 100. The writing is credited to James Taylor, Ronald Bell, and Kool & the Gang.

== Composition ==
"Misled" is written in the key of E minor (recorded a half-step lower in E♭ minor) with a moderately fast rock tempo of 122 beats per minute. The group's vocals span from B_{3} to A_{5} in the song.

== Track listing ==
12" vinyl single

Side A

1. "Misled" (Full-Length Version) — 4:59

Side B

1. "Ladies' Night" (Remix) — 6:58
2. "Rollin'" — 3:10

== Charts ==
=== Weekly charts ===
Chart (1984–1985)	Peak position
Australia (ARIA)	8
Belgium (Ultratip)	21
Germany (Official German Charts)	46
UK Singles (Official Charts Company)	28
US Billboard Hot 100	10
US Hot Black Singles	3
US "Billboard" Dance/Disco	9

=== Year-end charts ===
Year-end chart (1985)	Rank
US Top Pop Singles (Billboard)	69
