= Celebrate! =

Studio album by Kool & the Gang
- Released: September 29, 1980
- Recorded: January–July 1980
- Studios: House of Music, West Orange, New Jersey
- Genres: Disco; smooth soul
- Length: 35:18
- Label: De-Lite
- Producers: Kool and the Gang; Eumir Deodato

Kool & the Gang chronology
Ladies' Night (1979)	Celebrate! (1980)	Something Special (1981)

Singles from Celebrate!
- 1. "Celebration" Released: September 1980; 2. "Take It To the Top" Released: January 1981; 3. "Jones vs. Jones" Released: April 1981

Celebrate! is the twelfth studio album by American band Kool & the Gang. Released on September 29, 1980, the album reached No. 1 on the US R&B chart and #10 on the Billboard 200. The album produced perhaps Kool & the Gang's most recognizable hit song, the No. 1 chart-topper, "Celebration", which still receives heavy play today over four decades later.

== Critical reception ==
Professional ratings
Review scores
Source	Rating
AllMusic	3/5 stars
Robert Christgau	C−
Record Mirror	3/5 stars

Dennis Hunt of the Los Angeles Times called Celebrate! "the band's mostly excellent new album." Robert Christgau of The Village Voice said, "It says something for these funk pioneers that unlike James Brown, George Clinton, and the Ohio Players they've adapted painlessly, nay profitably, to disco: a number-one single leads their Deodato-produced album into the top ten. What it says is that their funk was as bland as you suspected." Amy Hanson of AllMusic found that "Celebrate itself marked the end of an era for Kool & the Gang, as the band would slip even farther from their funk roots and adopted dance grooves into the realms of smooth soul. But what a way to go!" Philip Hall of Record Mirror said, "Kool's Gang play penthouse-suite disco music. Every song gives off an air of easy affluence. There's no soul sound on this album just plenty of precise modern dance music. Though I admire Kool & The Gang for the way they effortlessly create light and airy dance rhythms, the overall feel of the album left me feeling untouched. This is highly efficient, automated disco music designed to keep the night clubbers of the world happy."

== Track listing ==
All tracks are written by Kool & the Gang; all tracks are co-written by Ronald Bell, except where noted.

Side one
No.	Title	Writer(s)	Length
1.	"Celebration"		4:58
2.	"Jones vs. Jones"	George Brown	4:18
3.	"Take It to the Top"		4:19
4.	"Morning Star"	Robert Mickens	3:46

Side two
No.	Title	Writer(s)	Length
1.	"Love Festival"	Charles Smith	5:16
2.	"Just Friends"		4:23
3.	"Night People"		3:47
4.	"Love Affair"	Brown	4:21
Total length:			35:18

2016 Deluxe Edition bonus tracks
No.	Title	Writer(s)	Length
9.	"Celebration" (single version)		3:42
10.	"Take It to the Top" (single version)		3:33
11.	"Jones vs. Jones" (single version)	Brown	3:48
12.	"Morning Star" (long version)	Mickens	4:14
13.	"Celebremos" (12" Spanish version)		5:22
Total length:			55:40

== Personnel ==
- Bass – Robert "Kool" Bell
- Lead guitar – Charles Smith
- Keyboards, saxophone, backing vocals – Ronald Bell
- Drums, percussion, backing vocals – George Brown
- Lead and backing vocals – James "J.T." Taylor
- Alto saxophone – Dennis Thomas
- Trumpet, backing vocals – Robert Mickens
- Keyboards, backing vocals – Earl Toon, Jr.
- Keyboards – Kevin Bell
- Additional keyboards – Adam Epolito
- Backing vocals – Cedric Toon, Meekaeel Muhammad, Robert Bell, Coffee, Something Sweet
- Orchestra arranger and conductor – Eumir Deodato

Production

- Recording engineer – Jim Bonnefond
- Assistant engineers – Bobby Cohen, Clif Hodsdon, Jeff Kawalex, Joe DeAngelis, Jullian Robertson, Kenny Robb
- Mixing – Eumir Deodato, Jim Bonnefond, Gabe Vigorito
- Mastering – Tom Coyne
- Producer – Eumir Deodato
- Associate producer – Kool & the Gang
- CD mastering – Joe Gastwirt
- CD remastering – Joe Gastwirt

== Certifications ==
Region	Certification	Certified units/sales
Canada (Music Canada)	Gold	50,000^{^}
United States (RIAA)	Platinum	1,000,000^{^}
^{^} Shipments figures based on certification alone.
