= Sennie "Skip" Martin =

American singer-songwriter

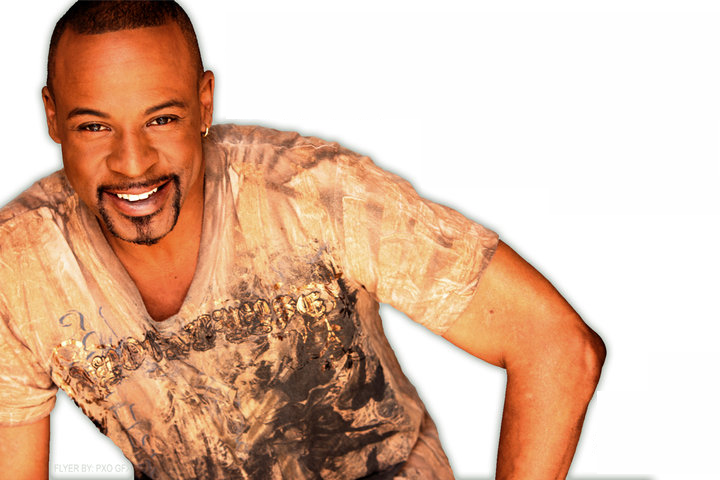

Background information
- Born: June 25, 1957 (age 69); San Francisco, California, U.S.
- Genres: R&B; funk; jazz; EDM
- Website: www.skipmartinmusic.com

Sennie "Skip" Martin III (born June 25, 1957, in San Francisco, California, U.S.) is an American musician, now based in Las Vegas. He is a lead vocalist, trumpet player, songwriter and producer who was formerly lead vocalist for Kool & the Gang (1988–2007) and the Dazz Band, winning a Grammy Award with the latter group for the song "Let It Whip".

== Biography ==
Martin's love of jazz started at the age of eleven, and he learned trumpet. Later he won “Outstanding Trumpet Soloist” at the Monterey Jazz Festival while in high school. His first solo jazz CD, Miles High features Ronnie Laws, Wayman Tisdale, Al McKay, Ricky Lawson and Bruce Conte.

Prior to joining Kool & The Gang and the Dazz Band, Martin was lead singer for the East Wind Band, followed by a stint as lead singer for the Mighty Generation Band.

With Kool & the Gang, he achieved a Platinum record, and with the Dazz Band he achieved Platinum & Gold records. In his career, he released six consecutive Top 100 albums and two Top 100 singles. Martin has also received an Honorary Degree of Doctor in Music, Lifetime Achievement Award from the African American Music Association, Living Legend Award from the Black Music Academy.

In the early 2020s, Skip Martin led the People Get Ready project, also known as "Legends Unite for St. Jude," with 29 major recording artists that have joined, to aid the children of St. Jude and their families who have been directly affected by COVID-19. This initiative won an Emmy Award at The National Academy of Television Arts & Sciences - Southeast Region, held on June 17, 2023 in Atlanta, GA.

Skip Martin was also honored with the Prestigious 2023 Presidential Lifetime Achievement Award.
