= Good Times (Kool & the Gang album) =

Studio album by Kool and the Gang
- Released: November 1972
- Recorded: 1972
- Studio: Mediasound, New York City
- Genre: Funk
- Length: 31:26
- Label: De-Lite
- Producer: Kool and the Gang

Kool and the Gang chronology
Music Is the Message (1972)	Good Times (1972)	Wild and Peaceful (1973)

Professional ratings
Review scores
Source	Rating
AllMusic	2.5/5 stars

Good Times is the third studio album by the funk band Kool and the Gang, released in November 1972. It made the Billboard R&B album chart in March 1973, peaking at number 34 during a 6-week run.

== Track listing ==
All tracks are written by Kool & the Gang, except where indicated.

Side 1
No.	Title	Writer(s)	Length
1.	"Good Times"		4:16
2.	"Country Junky"		2:55
3.	"Wild Is Love"	George "Funky" Brown, Robert "Spike" Mickens	3:24
4.	"North, East, South, West"	Ricky West	3:38

Side 2
No.	Title	Writer(s)	Length
1.	"Making Merry Music"		3:04
2.	"I Remember John W. Coltrane"	Khalis Bayyan	4:02
3.	"Rated X"		4:02
4.	"Father, Father"	George "Funky" Brown	5:37

== Personnel ==
- Dennis "D.T." Thomas – alto saxophone, vocals, flute, percussion
- Ronald Bell – tenor saxophone, soprano saxophone, vocals, alto flute
- Robert "Spike" Mickens – trumpet, vocals, flugelhorn, percussion
- Claydes Smith – electric guitar, acoustic guitar
- Rick West – acoustic piano, vocals, clavinet, ARP synthesizer
- Robert "Kool" Bell* – bass, vocals
- George Brown – drums, vocals, percussion

Additional Personnel

- Allen McGill – cello
- Billy Brown – French horn
- Sharon Moe – French horn
- Assunta Dell'Aquila – harp
- Marty Salyk – viola
- Sy Miroff – violin
- Al Wagner – violin
- San Zimmerman – violin

Production

- Produced and Arranged by Kool and the Gang
- Engineers – Tony Bongiovi and Jeff Lesser
- Recorded at Mediasound Studios (New York, NY)
- Artwork – Alfredo Seville
- Liner Notes – Norma Pinnella
