= James "J.T." Taylor =

American singer (born 1953)

James "JT" Taylor
- Also known as: JT Taylor
- Born: James Warren Taylor; August 16, 1953 (age 73); Laurens, South Carolina, U.S.
- Genres: R&B; soul; funk; post-disco; electro
- Occupations: Singer; songwriter; actor
- Instruments: Vocals; keyboards; drums
- Years active: 1978–present
- Labels: De-Lite, MCA

James "JT" Warren Taylor (born August 16, 1953) is an American singer who achieved fame as the lead singer of Kool & the Gang between 1979 and 1988.

Taylor joined Kool & the Gang in 1979 and remained with the group for nine years. His tenure as lead singer was the most successful era in the band's history with the albums Ladies' Night (1979), Celebrate! (1980) and Emergency (1984) and hit singles including "Ladies' Night", the US No. 1 "Celebration", "Get Down on It", "Joanna", "Misled", "Cherish" and "Fresh".

Taylor left the group in 1989 to begin a solo career but has reunited with the band a few times for concerts, also recording one last album with them in 1996.

== Early life ==
Taylor was born on August 16, 1953, in Laurens, South Carolina, and grew up in Hackensack, New Jersey. Before his rise to fame, he was a teacher and night club singer, having first joined a band at the age of 13. In 1978 he played with Milton Galfas, Christopher Galfas, and Eleton Johns in Full Force. He left Full Force when Christopher Galfas brought him to his brother's House of Music studio to audition for Kool & the Gang.

== Kool & the Gang ==
Taylor joined the band in 1979 after the group auditioned for a lead singer. He noted that vocals added more warmth to the songs, especially to ballads, which the group had avoided as no one could sing them properly. Taylor also recalled some resistance from some members and the group of female singers they had used on The Force and Everybody's Dancin'. In 1979, the band recorded and released Ladies' Night, which became their most successful album since their formation helped by the singles "Too Hot" and "Ladies' Night", which went to No. 5 and No. 8 on the Billboard Hot 100 chart, respectively. In January 1980, Ladies' Night was certified platinum by the RIAA for selling one million copies in the US.

In September 1980, the band released the album Celebrate! It became a bigger commercial success than Ladies' Night; the lead single "Celebration" remains the band's only single to reach No. 1 on the Billboard Hot 100 singles chart. The song originated from the lyric "Come on, let's all celebrate" from "Ladies' Night" which inspired Robert Bell to write a song that he described as "an international anthem." The band developed the song on a tour bus after attending the American Music Awards. The song was used in national media coverage for the 1980 World Series, the 1981 Super Bowl, the 1981 NBA Finals, and the 1981 return of the Iran hostages.

After the release of Something Special (1981), which continued the level of success of the previous two albums, the band recorded As One (1982), their fourth and final album with producer Eumir Deodato. The latter struggled to reach gold certification in the US, which led to the band's decision to end their time with Deodato as they had enough with the direction they had adopted. They then decided to produce their next album, In the Heart (1983), by themselves with Jim Bonnefond as co-producer. The album contained the US top-five single "Joanna". The song was declared the most-played pop song in 1984 by Broadcast Music International. Bonnefond stayed with the group for Emergency (1984), which remains their highest selling album with over two million copies sold in the US. It spawned four US top 20 singles, including "Emergency", "Cherish", "Fresh", and "Misled". This feat made Kool & the Gang the only band to have four top 20 singles from a single album in 1985.

In June 1984, Kool & the Gang took time off from recording Emergency to perform at Wembley Stadium as part of a sold-out summer concert organised by Elton John. That November, during a visit to Phonogram's offices in London, Bob Geldof arrived to pitch his idea of the multi-artist charity single "Do They Know It's Christmas?" to the label. Kool & the Gang participated in the project.

The group's seventeenth album, Forever, was released in November 1986. The album included two hit singles on the Billboard Hot 100 chart: "Victory" (US #10, R&B #2) and "Stone Love" (US #10, R&B #4). Two further singles, "Holiday" and "Special Way" were also released from the album; the former reached the top ten on the R&B Chart, the latter hit reached #6 on the Adult Contemporary chart. By 1986, the band had scored 14 top 40 singles in the US since 1980, more than Michael Jackson. In July 1986, the band recorded a special version of "Celebration" with different vocals that was used in an advertisement for Wendy's.

In 1987, the band completed a 50-city tour of the US. The tour included the group establishing their own public service program, devised by Robert Bell and Taylor, which encouraged school children to pursue education, giving free tickets to those with perfect attendance. The group rehearsed their stage show with a choreographer at Prince's studio at Paisley Park. At the time of the tour's start, the band ceased producing adverts with Schlitz beer because of their new image towards children and that they felt it had run its course. After the tour, Taylor left Kool & the Gang to pursue a solo career, but briefly returned in 1996 for the State of Affairs album. He has also reunited with the band a few times in live concerts.

In 2024, Taylor was inducted into the Rock and Roll Hall of Fame, as a member of Kool & the Gang.

== Solo career ==
In 1988, Taylor pursued a solo career and has released four solo albums to date.

He scored an immediate solo hit with "All I Want Is Forever", a duet with Regina Belle, which was featured on the soundtrack to the early-1989 Gregory Hines film, Tap. The song later appeared as a bonus track on CD editions of Taylor's debut solo album, Master of the Game, along with Belle's next solo album, both of which were released that same year. Master of the Game produced several additional hits, including the single "The Promised Land" which also appeared on the soundtrack of Ghostbusters II.

In 1991, Taylor released his second solo album, Feel the Need, which garnered the hits "Long Hot Summer Night" and "Heart to Heart", a duet with Stephanie Mills.

1993 saw the release of the singer's third solo album, Baby I'm Back, followed by his fourth solo album in 2000 titled A Brand New Me.

== Acting career ==
In the 1990s, Taylor began his acting career in the 1992 Hollywood film The Mambo Kings and the long-running Broadway musical Raisin.

== Discography ==
=== With Kool & the Gang ===
==== Studio albums ====
Year	Album
1979	Ladies' Night
1980	Celebrate!
1981	Something Special
1982	As One
1983	In the Heart
1984	Emergency
1986	Forever
1996	State of Affairs

==== Singles ====
Year	Single
1979	"Ladies' Night"
1979	"Too Hot"
1980	"Hangin' Out"
1980	"Celebration"
1981	"Take It to the Top"
1981	"Jones vs. Jones"
1981	"Take My Heart (You Can Have It If You Want It)"
1981	"Steppin' Out"
1981	"Get Down on It"
1982	"No Show"
1982	"Big Fun"
1982	"Let's Go Dancin' (Ooh La, La, La)"
1982	"Hi De Hi, Hi De Ho"
1983	"Street Kids"
1983	"Straight Ahead"
1983	"Joanna"
1984	"Tonight"
1984	"(When You Say You Love Somebody) In the Heart"
1984	"Fresh"
1984	"Misled"
1985	"Cherish"
1985	"Emergency"
1986	"Victory"
1987	"Stone Love"
1987	"Holiday"
1987	"Special Way"
1987	"Peace Maker"
1988	"Celebration" (remix)
1996	"Salute to the Ladies"

=== Solo ===
==== Studio albums ====
Year	Title	Chart positions	Record label
Year	Title	US R&B	Record label
1989	Master of the Game	77	MCA
1991	Feel the Need	—	MCA
1993	Baby I'm Back	—	MCA
2000	A Brand New Me	—	Interscope Records
"—" denotes the album failed to chart

==== Singles ====
Year	Title	Peak chart positions		Album
Year	Title	US R&B/HH	UK	Album
1989	"All I Want Is Forever" (duet with Regina Belle)	2	144	Tap OST
1989	"Sister Rosa"	53	—	Master of the Game
1990	"Master of the Game"	32	—	Master of the Game
1990	"8 Days a Week" (US only)	81	—	Master of the Game
1991	"Long Hot Summer Night"	13	63	Feel the Need
1991	"Heart to Heart" (duet with Stephanie Mills) (US promo)	65	—	Feel the Need
1991	"Feel the Need" (UK only; US promo)	—	57	Feel the Need
1992	"Follow Me" (UK only)	—	59	Feel the Need
1993	"Baby I'm Back" (US promo)	65	—	Baby I'm Back
1994	"Prove My Love" (US promo)	—	—	Baby I'm Back
1999	"Sex on the Beach" (US only)	—	—	A Brand New Me
2000	"How" (US only)	82	—	A Brand New Me
"—" denotes releases that did not chart or were not released.
