= Twelve-inch single =

Type of vinyl phonograph record

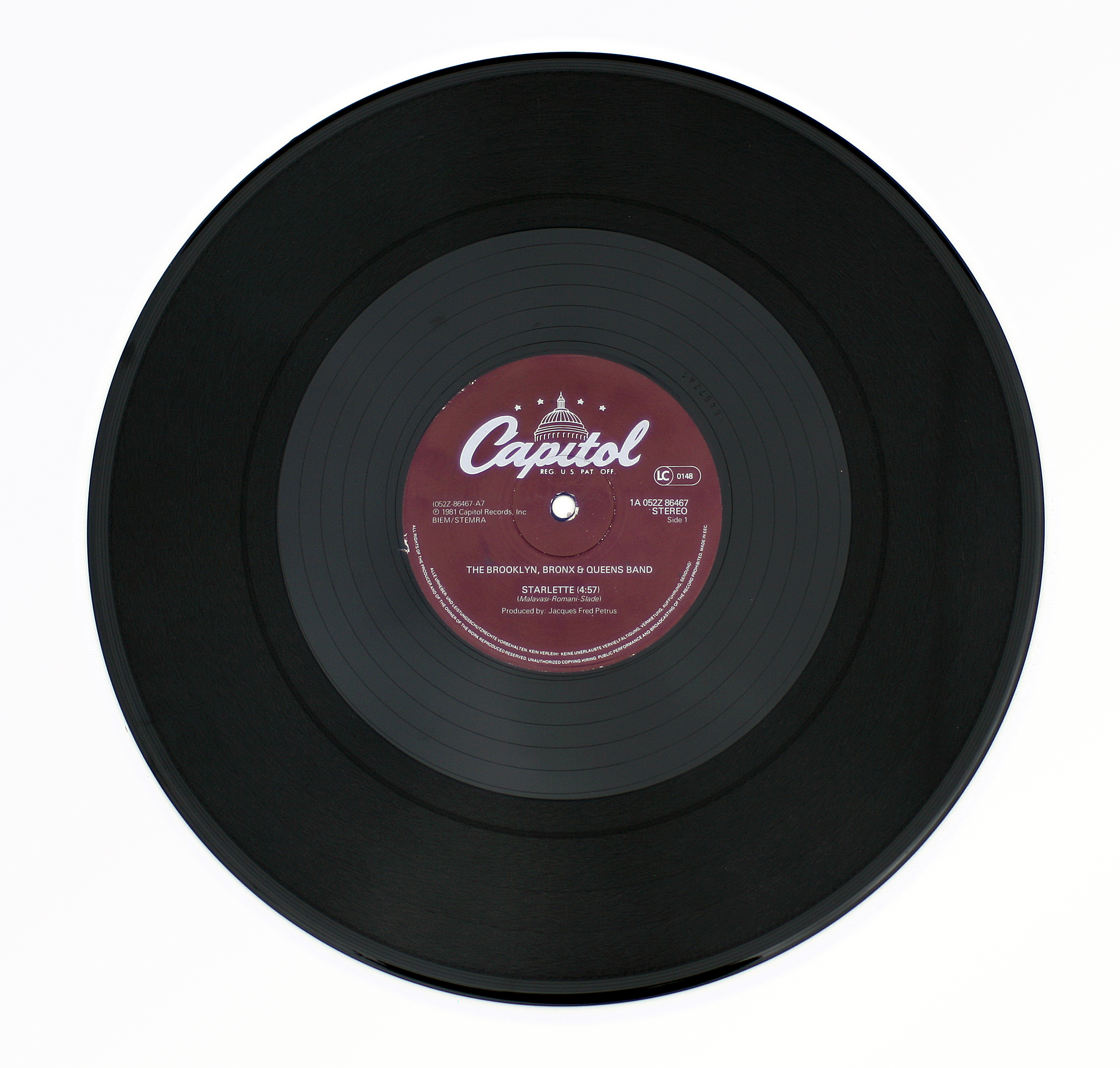
A twelve-inch Capitol Records gramophone record

The twelve-inch single (often written as 12-inch or 12″) is a type of vinyl (polyvinyl chloride or PVC) gramophone record that has wider groove spacing and shorter playing time with a "single" or a few related sound tracks on each surface, compared to LPs (long play) which have several songs on each side. It is named for its 12-inch (30 cm) diameter that was intended for LPs. This technical adaptation allows for louder levels to be cut on the disc by the mastering engineer, which in turn gives a wider dynamic range, and thus better sound quality. This record type, which is said to have been accidentally discovered by Tom Moulton, is commonly used in disco and dance music genres, where DJs use them to play in clubs. They are played at either 33 1/3 or 45 revolutions per minute (rpm). The conventional 7-inch single usually holds three or four minutes of music at full volume. The 12-inch LP sacrifices volume for extended playing time.

== Technical features ==
Twelve-inch singles have much shorter playing time than full-length LPs, and thus require fewer grooves per inch. This extra space permits a broader dynamic range or louder recording level as the grooves' excursions (i.e., the width of the groove waves and distance traveled from side to side by the turntable stylus) can be much greater in amplitude, especially in the bass frequencies important for dance music. Many record companies in the 1970s began producing 12-inch (30 cm) singles at 33 1/3 rpm, although 45 rpm gives better treble response.

== History ==
=== Pre-vinyl period ===
Gramophone records had been introduced in the latter portion of the 19th century, with several pioneers involved in sound reproduction development such as Thomas Edison and Emile Berliner. Berliner along with Eldridge R. Johnson merged their efforts within the industry to form the Victor Talking Machine Company in New Jersey, USA and perfected the use of 5 and 7-inch rotating shellac discs for sound replay from 1889, with 10-inch records appearing in 1901. In 1903 12-inch discs were introduced by Victor, on their Deluxe label, these able to play for up to four minutes, increasing the available length of a song or speech on the smaller formats. These first 12-inch releases were all by the Victor Grand Concert Band, led by Frederick W. Hager. During the 1910s discs became the standard sound reproduction format, although the speeds used could vary between manufacturers until 78 rpm became the norm from around 1925. An album would consist of several of these single discs packaged together. These brittle shellac discs remained a popular medium through the first attempt to introduce vinyl records in 1931, the subsequent move towards microgroove formats from 1948, and would survive until the early 1960s.

=== Vinyl and microgroove formats ===
In August 1931, RCA Victor launched the first commercially available vinyl long-playing record, marketed under their Program Transcription series. These revolutionary discs were designed for playback at 33^{1}/_{3} rpm (the speed first used on 16‑inch Vitaphone soundtrack discs from 1926) and pressed on ten and twelve-inch diameter flexible Victrolac discs, using a polyvinyl chloride (PVC) compound called vinylite which was licensed from Union Carbide. It was marketed initially as being more robust than shellac, with a duration of up to twenty minutes playing time per side. The first twelve-inch LP (containing only one track per side), was Beethoven's Symphony No. 5 In C Minor by the Philadelphia Orchestra conducted by Leopold Stokowski. RCA's early introduction of a long-play disc was a commercial failure for several reasons including the lack of affordable, reliable consumer playback equipment and consumer wariness during the Great Depression. Because of financial hardships that plagued the recording industry during that period (and RCA's own parched revenues), Victor's long-playing records were discontinued for public sale by early 1933.

However, vinyl continued to be used, notably with broadcasters, on larger 16‑inch radio transcription discs, and later with the V-Disc program that sent records overseas to US troops during World War II to help boost morale. Vinyl as a material for records sold to the public was reintroduced after World War II, first for 78s in 1945 (the Bolshoi Theatre Orchestra and Chorus's Prince Igor a 12‑inch 5-record set from Asch Recordings catalog number M-800), with 12‑inch 33^{1}/_{3} rpm LPs (with a narrower "microgroove")) and 7‑inch 45 rpm singles being marketed by Columbia Records and RCA Victor respectively in 1948 and 1949. Intriguingly, although there is a scientific basis behind 45 rpm being an ideal speed for sound quality which was touted by RCA, conveniently the 45 rpm number can also be derived by subtracting 33 from 78. 12-inch records would be reported in the press from the 1940s demonstrating usage not just for music but commercial and other reasons such as interviews, along with general manufacturing and public use reports and even children's records using the format.

Longer tracks could be accommodated on each side of the 12‑inch disc, or shorter but more numerous tracks per side. Indeed, the first 12‑inch vinyl album in 1948, Mendelssohn's Concerto in E Minor, featured only three tracks (the 11-minute first movement on side one, and the second and third movements on side two, together adding another 14 minutes) and was extended play (EP) in appearance, rather than a typical album with multiple tracks each being on average 2–4 minutes such as the first 10‑inch vinyl album, a reissue of The Voice of Frank Sinatra. While one to two short playing songs being sold to the public were more suited for the seven‑inch 45 rpm record, the LP could be anything from 1 track per side, and if in that simplistic configuration it technically could be classed as a twelve‑inch single. Over the ensuing years some works, particularly in the classical and jazz genres, and the relatively few tracks on an occasional album could blur the boundaries of what would become considered a twelve‑inch single, an EP and an album, with the price, catalogue number, any stylistic aims of the performing artist, marketing by the record label, as well as record industry sales charts rules regulating the differences between formats.

=== Jamaican roots ===
The gramophone records cut especially for dance-floor DJs came into existence with the advent of recorded Jamaican mento music in the 1950s. By at least 1956 it was already standard practice by Jamaican sound systems owners to give their "selecter" DJs acetate or flexi disc dubs of exclusive mento and Jamaican rhythm and blues recordings before they were issued commercially.

=== 1970s format resurgence ===
In March 1970, Cycle/Ampex Records test-marketed a twelve-inch single by jazz-pop guitarist Buddy Fite, featuring "Glad Rag Doll" backed with "For Once in My Life", both from his self-titled debut album issued in 1969. Subtitled 'The world's first 12-inch single!', the experiment aimed to energize the struggling singles market, offering a new option for consumers who had stopped buying traditional singles. The record was pressed at 33 rpm, with identical run times to the seven-inch 45 rpm pressing of the single and album, but with a large runoff area. Several hundred copies were made available for sale for 98 cents each at two Tower Records stores in California. Ampex also serviced a promo for Canadian act Young titled "Goin' In The Country" during 1971, the accompanying promotional note proclaiming the record as 'the biggest Canadian single ever.'.

Shelter Records evidently liked the format enough to use it a few times to promote artists in the US and Australia - they serviced a test pressing of Leon Russell's "It's A Hard Rain's Gonna Fall" backed with "Me And Baby Jane" to radio stations in July 1971, the first track from his Leon Russell and the Shelter People album, with the flip side from his Carney album. Shelter later issued another promotional single "Lowdown in Lodi"/"Me and My Guitar" by Freddie King in 1972 with the tracks taken from his Texas Cannonball LP.

Another early twelve-inch single was released in 1973 by soul/R&B musician/songwriter/producer Jerry Williams, Jr. a.k.a. Swamp Dogg. Twelve-inch promotional copies of "Straight From My Heart" were released on his own Swamp Dogg Presents label (Swamp Dogg Presents #501/SDP-SD01, 33+^{1}/_{3} r.p.m.), with distribution by Jamie/Guyden Distribution Corporation. It was manufactured by Jamie Record Co. of Philadelphia, Pennsylvania. The B-side of the record is blank.

=== Disco era ===
The disco twelve-inch record came into being from several key developments:

- using the instrumental or backing track with the vocal version to create an extended version, and later on combining outtakes, adlibs and other unused material;
- creating a segued mix of different tracks, the length of which was less suited to a 7-inch record;
- using a physically larger format which allows greater bandwidth and dynamic range resulting in audibly "hotter" records;
- progressively increasing the awareness and availability of the format through trade publications, record shops and DJ record pools;

Tom Moulton, and Scepter Records along with its production chief Mel Cheren (later co-founder of dance label West End Records) were involved in several of these pioneering steps due to their artists and heavy bass-range and strong uptempo songs, forward-thinking company executives and innovative remixing.

==== First instrumental side ====
This was released by Scepter to the flip side of the Ultra High Frequency "We're on the Right Track" seven-inch single in 1973. This issuing of the backing track enabled DJ's to use two turntables and mix between the vocal and instrumental versions of popular dance records, segueing them so that dancing patrons could enjoy the overall song for longer. A key reason of the time was that few varispeed turntables existed, so DJ's would only blend into a track with the same drum tempo or BPM, which the instrumental naturally was. This was in comparison to the then occasionally found 'Part 2' B-side of a record, while similar, tended to be the latter half of a lengthy album track, split for seven-inch release, but in many cases this wasn't the full instrumental, so could be more awkward to use. Scepter, from this single onward began to regularly add a non-vocal side, helping to make it an industry standard practice, with several other labels following suit particularly for dance records, and DJs embracing these as a useful tool during their sets.

==== First extended edit ====
While not his first production work (his first mixing effort was the northern soul track by the Carstairs "It Really Hurts Me Girl" in 1973), in early 1974, during his quest to adapt songs beyond the radio-friendly three-minute mark for his mixtapes, soon-to-be famed disco mixer Tom Moulton went to record labels for material. At Scepter Records, Cheren recalls playing Tom a previously released Scepter single by singer Don Downing called "Dream World". He had an extra copy of the master tape and let Moulton take it home to experiment. When Moulton brought it back a few days later, Cheren writes, "We were amazed: a so-so record was suddenly snappy, upbeat, and ten times better". But the biggest surprise, Cheren continues, was something "so radical I could hardly believe my ears". Moulton had stretched the original track, not even three minutes long, to almost double its time, and in the process debuted what would become known as the disco break. This innovation would eventually be issued on the song's re-release on a 7-inch 45 in July 1974, and earn Scepter a Billboard Trendsetter of the Year award in December 1974 for 'being the first label to make specialized mixes for discotheques'.

==== First segued mixes ====
The first genre-themed set was created by Spring Records, as a commercial compilation of various artists licensed from a number of labels called Disco Par-r-r-ty, released in October 1974. Tom Moulton created one for the A side of the Gloria Gaynor Never Can Say Goodbye album, in January 1975 on MGM Records. As a development from his mixtapes, three songs (Honey Bee/Never Can Say Goodbye/Reach Out, I'll Be There) were not presented as separate pieces of music, but as an uninterrupted, 18-minute-plus, side-long composition optimised for dancing. There were previous albums that had side-long tracks or suites, and medleys which were usually cover versions or re-recordings, but here was a new piece of music composed out of already recorded pieces of music (albeit containing two cover songs), making it the first "DJ mix" committed to vinyl, with Moulton admitting it was conceived as a tool for dancefloors. A followup was the Motown compilation Disc-O-Tech series released mid May 1975, which put together some of the label's most danceable hits onto a number of albums. Disc-O-Tech #2 however, specifically focused on blending a number of their disco releases into a non-stop medley.

==== Early acetates 10-inch and 12-inch ====
The first large-format single made specifically for discotheque DJs was a ten-inch acetate used by a mix engineer (José Rodríguez) in need of a Friday-night test copy for a remix created by Tom Moulton in 1974. The song was "I'll Be Holding On" by Al Downing, brother of Don Downing. As no 7-inch (18 cm) acetates could be found, a 10-inch (25 cm) blank was used. Upon completion, Moulton found that such a large disc with only a couple of inches worth of grooves on it made him feel silly wasting all that space. He asked Rodríguez to re-cut it so that the grooves looked more spread out and ran to the normal center of the disc. Rodriguez told him that for it to be viable, the level would have to be increased considerably. Because of the wider spacing of the grooves, not only was a louder sound possible but also a wider overall dynamic range (distinction between loud and soft) as well. This was immediately noticed by them to give a more favorable, 'hotter' sound which would appeal to discothèque play. It also meant that these extended versions being created by Moulton could be given to fellow DJs and tested within a nightclub environment to see how well it worked the dancefloor, with adjustments subsequently made to the remix.

Moulton's position as the premiere mixer and "fix it man" for pop singles ensured that this fortunate accident would instantly become industry practice. This would perhaps have been a natural evolution: as dance tracks became much longer than had been the average for a pop song, and as the DJ in the club wanted sufficient dynamic range, the format would likely have enlarged from the seven-inch single eventually. Ironically, Moulton's mix of Downing would be eventually released by Chess Records for sale to the general public, but only on a standard-issue 7-inch record for sale in October 1974. Further 10-inch acetates featuring the extended versions would be created by Moulton and Rodriguez from late 1974 such as Moment of Truth's "Your Love" on Roulette in October and the aforementioned Don Downing "Dream World". "I'll be Holding On" would eventually be cut onto a twelve-inch acetate, as chronicled by its usage on the music compilation album A Tom Moulton Mix.

An acetate twelve-inch test pressing single hailed as being a first by Moulton was South Shore Commission "Free Man". Again, it was a disco mix prepared by Moulton, pressed by Rodríguez, with only a handful (around 10) cut and handed out to local DJs. These would have plain white labels, or very sparse printing or typed text. In many cases there would be no logos, and many contained handwritten text only. Test pressings being tried out at discos were reported on in Moulton's weekly column in Billboard during early April 1975. Moulton's effort was eventually issued for commercial release by Scepter in June 1975, but on seven-inch vinyl as a 5:35 min mix. Moulton subsequently created a lengthier 7:15 min mix for the album which appeared in late October.

Another record remixed by Moulton was the Philly Devotions "I Just Can't Make It Without You" on Columbia. Mentioned in his Billboard column in mid April as being 'out soon', a known 10-inch acetate had a date of 8 May 1975, with twelve-inch acetates and promos also appearing at some stage. It eventually was issued commercially in August on seven-inch 45 only. A sometimes mentioned candidate among these first acetates is Moment of Truth "So Much For Love", but this effort was commercially released a year later, the band having been signed to Salsoul Records in June 1976, and the song only appearing in disco charts at the end of July of that year.

==== Promotion through media and DJs ====
Many of the above disco era timelines were driven by the DJ necessity to give a better nightclub dancefloor experience to patrons, and as the scene grew, it began to be chronicled in trade press publications such as Billboard and Record World. Tom Moulton began to write for the former from 26 October 1974 in the Disco Action column (which changed name as time went on), while Vince Aletti wrote Disco File in the latter from November 1974. The DJs would increasingly be expected to report back, much like with radio, with what songs worked on their dancefloors to the record company and mixers such as Moulton and others so that a strategic decision would be made whether to further fine tune or remix the music to enhance the reaction, typically a new edit would be repeatedly created, pressed on acetates and supplied until a good response was had from nightclubs, so creating a buzz which would drive the eventual commercial sales.

To better feed those reactions back record pools were established, the first in New York in June 1975 for better distribution of pre-release records to bona fide DJs as record labels began to appreciate their role in breaking and selling records. A further development began to see the labels tailor the records specifically towards DJs as a result, with for example Scepter Records publicly announcing via both publications that they were to start servicing '12-inch 45s' to DJs in pools and their national promotional mailouts from June 1975. promoting the format earlier in distributor roadshows they hosted in late May, citing a key benefit of high volume levels being maintained with lengthier tracks. Billboard magazine reported that Atlantic Records were the first major label to issue 12-inch 33 rpm vinyl promos to DJs in July, under the watchful eye of a DJ as their promotions director Doug Riddick, who took up the post in May 1975.

==== Early vinyl test pressings 12-inch ====
An early test pressing was Bobby Moore "(Call Me Your) Anything Man", on Scepter. Twelve-inch acetates for this single were pressed in April 1975, and was subsequently produced as twelve-inch vinyl promotional singles with typed labels in June. Moulton, now a regular in-house remixer for the label, was again given label credit for the remix. This was released commercially on 7-inch in May 1975.

==== First wide scale promotional 12-inch ====
A very early disco prototype vinyl 12-inch pressing was a Midland International promo distributed by RCA - this was a Carol Douglas one sided EP with 4 tracks from The Carol Douglas Album. This was issued in mid February 1975 and was subtitled 'Specially Prepared For Disco Use', but it held same length versions of the selected album tracks.

The first wide-scale record company promotional twelve-inch single according to Moulton (considering his then position with Billboard at the time as disco product reviewer, and that most of the very limited 12-inch records up to this point involved his own remixes), was Frankie Valli "Swearin' To God", issued by Private Stock Records in June 1975 with a 10:32 min running time. Bob Crewe, co-writer and producer, personally presented 10-inch test pressings to DJs in April 1975 after high pre-release demand. It was then issued commercially as a 7-inch at the end of April/start of May 1975.

Barrabas "Mellow Blow" became the first 33 rpm Atlantic promo to be released in July, but eventually commercially only on an 7" in September. Warner-Spector's Calhoon "(Do You Wanna) Dance, Dance, Dance" had a 10-inch acetate from May, given out as a one sided 10-inch vinyl promo in the same month, and as a 12-inch promo in July 1975.

At first, these special remixed or extended versions were only available as promotional copies to DJs, either given directly to them or issued by record pools who obtained these from record companies' A&R departments. Examples of these promos, released from spring/summer 1975, include:

Selected promotional vinyl 12-inch US singles in 1975
| Artist | Title | Label | Release month | Notes |
|---|---|---|---|---|
| Carol Douglas | The Carol Douglas Album sampler | Midland International | February | 4 track disco EP/LP |
| Frankie Valli | "Swearin' To God" | Private Stock | April (10-inch) / June | |
| Bobby Moore | "(Call Me Your) Anything Man" | Scepter | June | Test pressing |
| Banzaii | "Chinese Kung Fu" | Scepter | June | |
| Calhoon | "(Do You Wanna) Dance, Dance, Dance" | Warner-Spector | May (10-inch) / July | |
| Barrabas | "Mellow Blow" | Atlantic | July | |
| The Eleventh Hour | "Hollywood Hot" | 20th Century | July | |
| Philly Devotions | "I Just Can't Make It" | Columbia | August | |
| The Trammps | "Hooked For Life" | Atlantic | August | |
| Ace Spectrum | "Keep Holdin' On" | Atlantic | August | |
| Secrets | "(Baby) Save Me" | Scepter | August | |
| The Chequers | "Undecided Love" | Scepter | September | |
| Touch of Class | "I'm in Heaven" | Midland International | September | |
| Silver Convention | "Always Another Girl" / "Fly, Robin, Fly" | Midland International | September | |
| Ronnie Spector | "You'd Be Good For Me" | Tom Cat | September | |
| War | "Low Rider" | United Artists | September | |
| The Miracles | "Love Machine" | Tamla (Motown) | September | |
| David Ruffin | "Walk Away From Love" | Motown | September | |
| Soul Train Gang | "Soul Train '75" | Soul Train | September | |
| Natural Order | "Jealousy" | Sound of Washington D.C. | September | |
| Ernie Bush | "Breakaway" | Scepter-Contempo | October | |
| Gary Toms Empire | "Drive My Car" | PIP/Pickwick | October | |
| The Ritchie Family | "I Want To Dance" | 20th Century | October | |
| The Wiz / Hot Chocolate | "Tornado" / "Disco Queen" | Atlantic | October | Acetate reissue |
| Vicki Sue Robinson | "Never Gonna Let You Go" | RCA | November | |
| Papa John Creach & the Midnight Sun | "Joyce" | Buddah | November | |
| Ralph Carter | "Extra Extra" | Mercury | November | |
| Jimmy James and the Vagabonds | "I Am Somebody" | Pye | November | |
| Gail | "Consideration" | SMI | December | |

==== First 12-inch retail singles ====
===== Motivation for public sale =====
As time went on, a growing number of record labels became aware of the 12-inch format as a useful promotional tool, the benefits it gave for sound fidelity, and started to issue product in response. However, into early 1976 none considered them at first as suitable for sale to the general public. Companies came to appreciate the place of the nightclub and how they helped to break a record, but still considered an extended remix to ultimately facilitate sales of the original 7-inch single version or the artist's album, and not as a sale item in its own right.

Pop orientated labels began to use the format to promote commercial artists with dance elements to their music, but not necessarily lengthening their tracks, concentrating instead on its novel aspects. The costs for the format were also still prohibitive; one label reported 12-inch singles cost more than it did to press an album.

However, demand was being driven by record shops, particularly those serving disco product, with feedback from buyers. It was particularly noticed that many of the previously released promotional 12-inch singles were attracting a premium in the resellers marketplace, with them in some cases changing hands for the price of an album. Along with research done by labels to get a feel of the interest for the proposed format, a push was finally made by a self-proclaimed 'pioneer' label of the disco business.

===== Releases =====
The first song found on a twelve-inch single commercially issued for public purchase from the disco era onwards was "Ten Percent" by Double Exposure on Salsoul Records in mid May 1976. This was due to the label co-owner Ken Cayre's decision to release the Walter Gibbons remix for dancers who would hear that version in nightclubs but not be satisfied with the shorter versions sold on the 7-inch vinyl or the album. The seven-inch edit had been released a month earlier but sales of this were slow. With renewed interest and high sales weeks after the release, Salsoul were presented with Billboard awards at the 1976 Disco Forum event for disco disk sales to consumers and best record label as a result of the push into the marketplace with the new format. The issue did not contain the 3 min 5 secs 7-inch edit or the 6 mins 51 mins album version; the A side contained the Gibbons 9 min 43 secs remix, while Cayre himself created an extended 7 min 31 secs mix for the B side.

The second twelve-inch release was the double artist single Jesse Green "Nice And Slow" / Sweet Music "I Get Lifted" on Scepter/Wand in mid June 1976. Third was a disc containing two George Benson sides "Summertime 2001" / "Theme From Good King Bad" in late June 1976 on CTI Records. Salsoul's second 12-inch record for retail was by Moment of Truth "So Much For Love" / "Helplessly" released in early July 1976. Amherst Records released a double headed single by the Chicago Gangsters "Gangster Love" / "Feel Like Making Love" in early July 1976 on their Gold Plate subsidiary. A clutch of releases including Jakki "Sun... Sun... Sun" and Four Below Zero "My Baby's Got E.S.P.", amongst others on Pyramid/Roulette Records was sold from mid July 1976.

=== Australia ===
Two twelve-inch promotional vinyl issues for rock/folk Shelter Records artists were serviced to radio stations in April 1972 by local distributor Tempo Records:

=== Canada ===
In 1971 Ampex of Canada released a single, Goin' To The Country / Grape Farm by Young on 12 inch 45prpm format.

=== France ===
Early titles first appeared in 1976 on the Pathe Marconi EMI and Disques Vogue imprints, these included pop releases such as Paul McCartney's first ever extended single internationally, credited as Wings "Let 'Em In"

=== Jamaican discomixes ===
Although as previously mentioned regarding the Jamaican dub influence on the use of 10-inch acetates, the 12-inch single was only born once imports of US disco singles were established from 1976 onwards. The issued twelve-inch-single trend spread to Jamaica quickly, where hundreds of reggae singles were pressed in this format, and commercially issued as "discomixes" to catch on the disco hype. An early 12-inch pressing, reputedly the first was by the Jayes "Truly" in 1977 on the Channel One label, which was run by the Hoo Kim brothers from their Channel One Studios.

=== United Kingdom ===
The Jamaican reggae and US disco trend also hit London, reggae being popular along with uptempo forms of music such as Motown and northern soul, the seven-inch record being the primary medium in the early 1970s for this material, with the UK following up a little later than the US with 12-inch singles. The reasons were different, the UK jocks did not have the same need to extend records like the US pioneers who wanted longer records for the dancefloor. Although the use of larger temporary singles (primarily 10-inch) started from the Jamaican influence and before (such as the pre-Beatles band the Quarrymen with the one-off "In Spite of All the Danger" in 1958), acetates were also used by the record labels to quality control the eventual product, and not for servicing single songs or exclusive remixes, and then not in the 12-inch format. The usage of the 12-inch vinyl as a medium followed the US promos introduction but was initially seen as a marketing tool to help promote an artist more uniquely. Another emphasis with the new format was the louder sound and better audio quality afforded to the release. It therefore was not exclusively used for disco songs but included pop artists, however it eventually came into its own in the later 1970s with the lengthened versions of US disco songs being promoted in the UK.

==== Promo UK 12-inch releases ====
Atlantic Records was an early front runner with two 12-inch promo singles: Ben E. King "Supernatural Thing" backed with Osiris "Warsaw Concerto", along with Herbie Mann "Hijack" b/w Jimmy Castor Bunch "The Bertha Butt Boogie", both at 33 rpm and issued in approximately June 1975 (based on the catalogue numbers used), but rumoured to be as late as October. Robert Palmer "Which of Us Is the Fool" was released by Island Records also in October 1975. Virgin started a line of 12-inch promos in November 1975, with the first being Ruan O'Lochlainn "Another Street Gang".

Disco singles started to appear in earnest months later, Brass Construction "Changin'" was promoted around March 1976 by United Artists. A later 12-inch promo issue was a double sider the Moments "Nine Times" / the Rimshots "Do What You Feel" on All Platinum Records via Phonogram in the middle of April 1976, however both were released commercially and individually on seven-inch 45s only, in April 1976. Candi Staton followed with "Young Hearts Run Free" in the middle of May from Warner Bros.

These early issues usually contained the original 7-inch edit, and It took a little later for lengthened versions to begin appearing, with 1970s UK club DJ Greg Wilson recalling promotional 12-inch product being mailed out from August 1976, Lalo Schifrin "Jaws" being his first one, which was in extended form. This was followed by disco acts such as James Wells, the Originals, Ultrafunk, Mass Production, Deodato and the Undisputed Truth, however some of these were not UK pressed vinyl but US promos sent over to the UK and distributed through club promotions businesses and record company A&R departments.

==== First UK 12-inch retail singles ====
The first commercially released twelve-inch vinyl was Ernie Bush "Breakaway" / Banzaii "Chinese Kung Fu" both as Tom Moulton mixes, along with another disc containing the Armada Orchestra "For the Love of Money" / Ultrafunk "Sting Your Jaws (Part 1)". Bush and the latter two acts had Gerry Shury production involvement, and these two releases were issued by John Abbey's Contempo Records from 8 October 1976, these songs having been previously released in either 7-inch format or as album tracks. Abbey likely had the nod from Scepter Records about the use of the twelve-inch single format, as both had released all these titles on their labels and Contempo had cross-licensed the tracks with Moulton mixes. This was closely followed with a single containing re-issues of the Who's "Substitute" with "I'm A Boy" / "Pictures of Lily" on the flip, all originally from 1966 and 1967 by Polydor Records on 22 October 1976.

== Later developments ==
=== Core sales period ===
Notable 1970s and 1980s releases making use of the new length opportunities of the format included Donna Summer's "Love To Love You Baby" (16 min 50 seconds), "I Feel Love" (15:45), and Sugarhill Gang's "Rapper's Delight" (15:00). The broad visual spacing of the grooves on the twelve-inch records made it easy for the DJ in locating the approximate area of the "breaks" on the disc's surface in dim club light (without having to listen while dropping and re-dropping the stylus to find the right point). A quick study of any DJs favorite discs will reveal mild wear in the "break points" on the discs' surfaces that can clearly be seen by the naked eye, which further eases the "cueing" task (a club DJs tone-arm cartridge will be heavily weighted and mild wear will seldom spoil the sound quality). Many DJ-only remix services, such as Ultimix and Hot Tracks, issued sets with deliberately visualised groove separations (i.e., the record was cut with narrow and wider spacings that could be seen on the surface, marking the mix points on the often multi-song discs). Motown were one of the first to "eye cue" their 12-inch disco discs, giving DJs the track's BPM and info on the exact length of the various sections of the song - one of the earliest examples of a record company recognising how important the DJ was to become by making their product more user-friendly.

Following the lead of the US club DJs, using 12-inch extended versions in the UK as a mixing tool was advocated particularly by James Hamilton of the Record Mirror music weekly paper, with him notably indicating the approximate BPM of late 1970s disco tracks onwards. Increasingly in the 1980s, many pop and even rock artists released twelve-inch singles that included longer, extended, or remixed versions of the actual track being promoted by the single. These versions were frequently labeled with the parenthetical designation "12-inch version", "12-inch mix", "extended remix", "dance mix", or "club mix", before its usage becoming commonplace in the early/mid 1980s developing alongside turntabalism in use for the electro and hip-hop genres, but was regularised with the advent of the late 1980s house music scene. Later musical styles took advantage of this new format and recording levels on vinyl twelve-inch "maxi-singles" have steadily increased, culminating in the extremely loud (or "hot") cuts of drum and bass records of the 1990s and early 2000s.

Many record labels produced mainly twelve-inch singles (in addition to albums) during the 1980s, lots being mostly regular A and B-sides, not remixes. Certain labels such as Factory Records, only ever released a handful of seven-inch singles. One of Factory's resident artists, alternative rock/dance quartet New Order, produced the biggest-selling twelve-inch record ever in the United Kingdom, "Blue Monday", selling about 800,000 copies on the format and over a million copies in total (not counting later remixes). It was somewhat helped by the fact that Factory did not release a seven-inch version of the single until 1988, five years after the single was originally released as a twelve-inch-only release. Besides, the seven-inch version that was released was not the original 1983 version released on twelve-inch, but a re-recording called "Blue Monday 1988".

=== Decline and ongoing interest ===
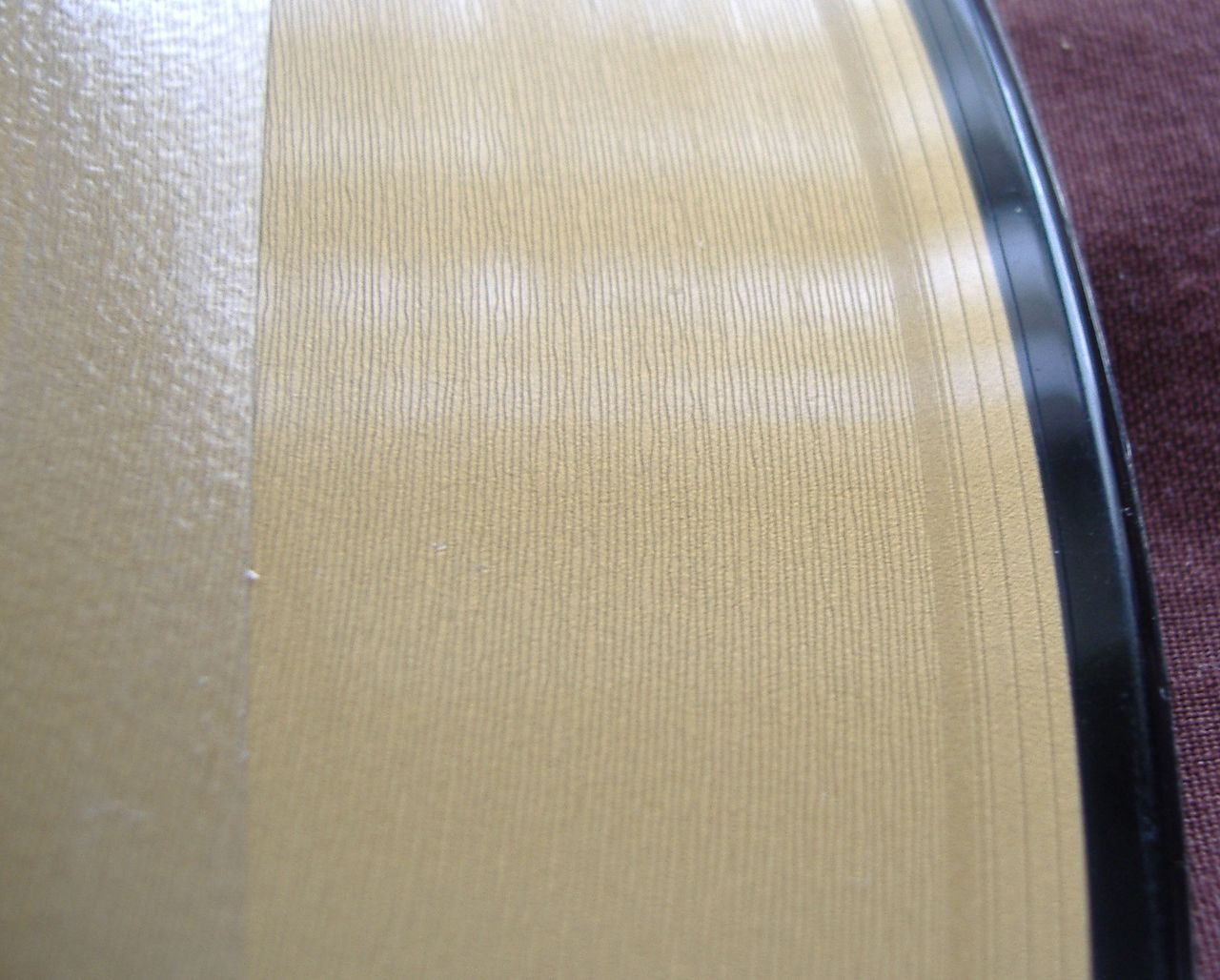
Close-up shot of a 12-inch (30 cm) single showing the wide grooves

Singles in general have followed wider gramophone record sales, withstanding competition from the 1960s and 70s reel-to-reel tape, the 8-track cartridge, and the compact cassette formats. The widespread popularity of Sony's Walkman was a key factor that contributed to fewer record sales in the 1980s. In 1988, the compact disc surpassed the gramophone record in unit sales. Vinyl records experienced a sudden decline in popularity in the U.S. between 1988 and 1991, when the major label distributors restricted their return policies, which retailers had been relying on to maintain and swap out stocks of relatively unpopular titles. Record companies also deleted many record titles from production and distribution, or simply did not make 12-inch singles for many pop artists, further undermining the availability of the format and leading to the closure of pressing plants. This rapid decline in the availability of records accelerated the format's decline in popularity, and was seen by some as a deliberate ploy to make consumers switch to CDs which were at the time more profitable for the record companies, MP3s and more latterly, streaming.

Twelve-inch singles production continued for dance acts or for dance remixes of commercial artists as there was a continued high regard of the format from DJs into the 2000s and 2010s. A growing number of DJs eventually began to use CDJs for their convenience, and later along with a crossover period where turntables could be combined with laptops and used with encoded 12 inch discs and DJ software, which could manipulate MP3 or WAV music files but still allow for a turntablism experience. DJ controller all-in-one decks have in later times become the norm which take up less space than a pair of turntables, reducing DJs dependence on the physical format even further. There is however, a dedicated DJ sub-community that has maintained their usage of the format, with retro styled "vinyl only" nights being a unique selling point. In addition, there have been some new titles being pressed on the format and available at physical record shops alongside an ongoing cultural vinyl revival, although many sales take place online. There is also a second-hand trade business on online sale and auction marketplaces for collectors, of which some titles are still in demand and can be of some value.
