= List of Billboard number-one disco singles of 1974 and 1975 =

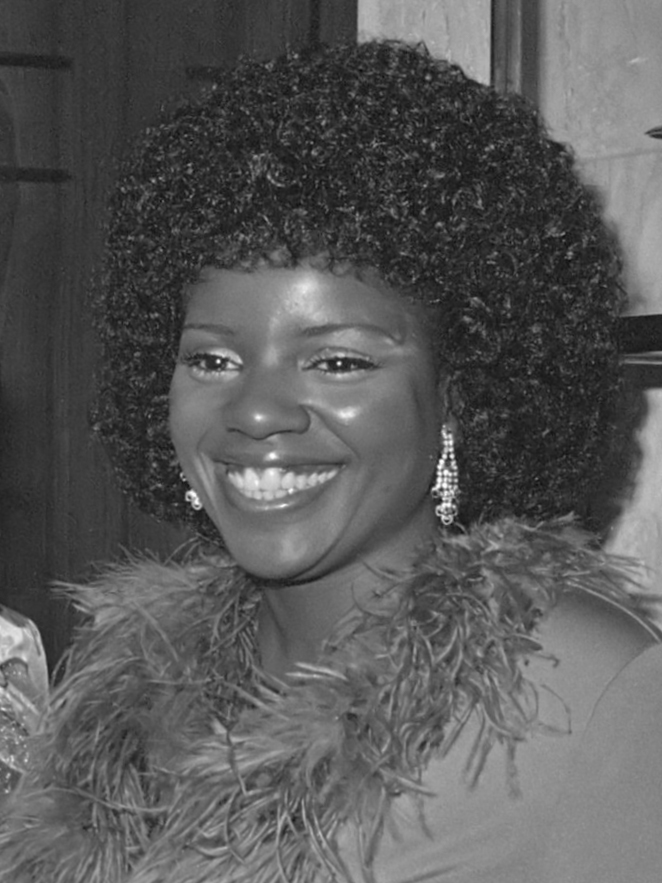
"Never Can Say Goodbye" (1974) by Gloria Gaynor is the first ever dance number-one single reported by Billboard.

Billboard began compiling the top-performing dance singles in the United States with the Disco Action chart in 1974. Premiered on the issue dated October 26, the chart ranked the popularity of songs in New York City discothèques, expanded to feature multiple charts each week which highlighted playlists in various cities such as San Francisco, Los Angeles, Miami, Chicago, Boston, Phoenix, Detroit and Houston. During this time, Billboard rival publication Record World was the first to compile a dance chart which incorporated club play on a national level. Noted Billboard statistician Joel Whitburn has since "adopted" Record World chart data from the weeks between March 29, 1975, and August 21, 1976, into Billboards club play history. For the sake of continuity, Record World national charts are incorporated into the 1975 and 1976 lists. With the issue dated August 28, 1976, Billboard premièred its own national chart ("National Disco Action Top 30") and their data is used from this date forward.

== Chart history ==
=== 1974 ===
Issue date	Single	Artist
Billboard Disco Action data
October 26	"Never Can Say Goodbye"	Gloria Gaynor
November 2	"Never Can Say Goodbye"	Gloria Gaynor
November 9	"Never Can Say Goodbye"	Gloria Gaynor
November 16	"Never Can Say Goodbye"	Gloria Gaynor
November 23	"Express"	B.T. Express
November 30	"Express"	B.T. Express
December 7	"Express"	B.T. Express
December 14	"Express"	B.T. Express
December 21	"Express"	B.T. Express
December 28	"I'll Be Holding On"	Al Downing

=== 1975 ===
Issue date	Single	Artist
Billboard Disco Action data
January 4	"I'll Be Holding On"	Al Downing
January 11	"I'll Be Holding On"	Al Downing
January 18	"Shame, Shame, Shame"	Shirley & Company
January 25	"Shame, Shame, Shame"	Shirley & Company
February 1	"Shame, Shame, Shame"	Shirley & Company
February 8	"Shame, Shame, Shame"	Shirley & Company
February 15	"Hijack"	Herbie Mann
February 22	"Hijack"	Herbie Mann
March 1	"Hijack"	Herbie Mann
March 8	"Bad Luck"	Harold Melvin & the Blue Notes
March 15	"Bad Luck"	Harold Melvin & the Blue Notes
March 22	"Bad Luck"	Harold Melvin & the Blue Notes
Record World disco chart data
March 29	"Bad Luck"	Harold Melvin & the Blue Notes
April 5	"Bad Luck"	Harold Melvin & the Blue Notes
April 12	"Bad Luck"	Harold Melvin & the Blue Notes
April 19	"Bad Luck"	Harold Melvin & the Blue Notes
April 26	"Bad Luck"	Harold Melvin & the Blue Notes
May 3	"Bad Luck"	Harold Melvin & the Blue Notes
May 10	"Bad Luck"	Harold Melvin & the Blue Notes
May 17	"Bad Luck"	Harold Melvin & the Blue Notes
May 24	"Ease On down the Road"	Consumer Rapport
May 31	"Ease On down the Road"	Consumer Rapport
June 7	"Ease On down the Road"	Consumer Rapport
June 14	"Ease On down the Road"	Consumer Rapport
June 21	"Free Man"	South Shore Commission
June 28	"Ease On down the Road"	Consumer Rapport
July 5	"Forever Came Today"	The Jackson 5
July 12	"Forever Came Today"	The Jackson 5
July 19	"Forever Came Today"	The Jackson 5
July 26	"Dreaming a Dream"	Crown Heights Affair
August 2	"Forever Came Today"	The Jackson 5
August 9	"Brazil"	The Ritchie Family
August 16	"Brazil"	The Ritchie Family
August 23	"Brazil"	The Ritchie Family
August 30	"Brazil"	The Ritchie Family
September 6	"Brazil"	The Ritchie Family
September 13	"Brazil"	The Ritchie Family
September 20	"Brazil"	The Ritchie Family
September 27	"Fly, Robin, Fly"	Silver Convention
October 4	"Fly, Robin, Fly"	Silver Convention
October 11	"Fly, Robin, Fly"	Silver Convention
October 18	"Casanova Brown"/ "(If You Want It) Do It Yourself"/ "How High the Moon"	Gloria Gaynor
October 25	"Love to Love You Baby"	Donna Summer
November 1	"Love to Love You Baby"	Donna Summer
November 8	"Love to Love You Baby"	Donna Summer
November 15	"Love to Love You Baby"	Donna Summer
November 22	"I Love Music"	The O'Jays
November 29	"I Love Music"	The O'Jays
December 6	"I Love Music"	The O'Jays
December 13	"I Love Music"	The O'Jays
December 20	"I Love Music"	The O'Jays
December 27	"I Love Music"	The O'Jays

== See also ==
- 1974 in music
- 1975 in music
- List of Billboard Hot 100 number ones of 1974
- List of Billboard Hot 100 number ones of 1975
