= Heart of the City (album) =

Studio album by Barrabás
- Released: August 1975
- Recorded: 1974–75
- Genre: Latin rock, funk, soul
- Label: Ariola, Atco

Barrabás chronology
¡Soltad a Barrabás! (1974)	Heart of the City (1975)	Watch Out (1975)

Alternative cover

Heart of the City is the fourth album by the Spanish group Barrabás, released in 1975. The album charted at #149 on the Billboard 200 in the US, and was later re-released on CD in Spain as Check Mate.

This album was the first to feature Daniel Louis on drums, after the departure of José María Moll.

"Checkmate" / "Family Size" and "Make It Easy" / "Take a Wild Ride" were released as singles. The instrumental "Mellow Blow" was one of the first 12-inch singles to be released, and the first ever on Atlantic Records.

== Track listing ==
1. "Checkmate" (Fernando Arbex) – 4:28
2. "Take a Wild Ride" (E. Morales, M. Morales, Ernesto Duarte, Daniel Louis) – 4:00
3. "Along the Shore" (Duarte, José Luís Tejada) – 6:06
4. "Make It Easy" (E. Morales, M. Morales) – 3:54
5. "Family Size" (Arbex) – 3:21
6. "Mellow Blow" (E. Morales) – 4:12
7. "Thank You Love" (E. Morales, M. Morales) – 4:45
8. "Four Season Woman" (Arbex) – 3:57

== Personnel ==
- José Luís Tejada – lead vocals
- Enrique "Ricky" Morales – lead and acoustic guitars, backing vocals
- Miguel Morales – bass guitar, rhythm and acoustic guitars, backing vocals
- Ernesto "Tito" Duarte – saxophone, flute, percussion, bass guitar
- Juan Vidal – keyboards, backing vocals
- Daniel Louis – drums, percussion
- "The Waters" (Maxine, Julia & Patti) – backing vocals
- Produced by Fernando Arbex
- Recorded at Blue Rock Studios, New York

=== Release information ===
- Spain – Ariola Eurodisc
- Germany – Ariola 89 267 XOT
- USA & Canada – Atco SD 36-118
- Italy – Atlantic W50165
- Disconforme DISC 1993CD (2001 CD) – (as Check Mate)
- Wounded Bird WOBR6118 (2008 CD)
