= Power (Barrabás album) =

Studio album by Barrabás
- Released: January 1973
- Recorded: 1973
- Genre: Latin rock, funk, soul
- Label: RCA Records

Barrabás chronology
Wild Safari (1971)	Power (1973)	¡Soltad a Barrabás! (1974)

Alternative cover
- (L–R) M. Morales, Tejada, Duarte, Vidal, E. Morales, Moll

Power is a 1973 album by the Spanish group Barrabás. It was the first album to feature new vocalist José Luís Tejada, and drummer José María Moll, who had previously only played with the band in concerts. Tejada had replaced original singer and bassist Iñaki Egaña on vocals, with Miguel Morales moving to bass guitar. Band leader Fernando Arbex took on the role of producer.

"Boogie Rock" / "Mr Money" and "Casanova" / "Children" were released as singles.

== Track listing ==
1. "Mr Money" (Fernando Arbex) – 5:01
2. "Boogie Rock" (Arbex) – 6:15
3. "Keep on Moving" (Enrique Morales) – 3:32
4. "The Horse" (Miguel Morales) – 3:27
5. "Casanova" (Arbex) – 5:04
6. "You Know" (E. Morales, M. Morales, José Luís Tejada) – 3:51
7. "Children" (Arbex, M. Morales) – 3:40
8. "Time to Love" (M. Morales, M. González) – 3:42

== Personnel ==
- José Luís Tejada – lead vocals (except track 8), harmonica
- Enrique "Ricky" Morales – lead and acoustic guitars, backing vocals
- Miguel Morales – bass guitar, acoustic guitar, lead (track 8) and backing vocals
- Ernesto "Tito" Duarte – saxophone, flute, bass guitar, percussion, backing vocals
- Juan Vidal – keyboards
- José María Moll – drums, backing vocals
- Produced by Fernando Arbex
- Recorded at RCA Victor Studios, Madrid

=== Release information ===
- Spain – RCA Victor LSP 10487
- Germany – RCA Victor LSP 10404
- USA – RCA SPL1-2000
- Disconforme DISC 1992CD (2000 CD)

== Charts ==
Chart (1973)	Peak position
Spanish Albums Chart	3
