= Barrabás (album) =

Studio album by Barrabás
- Released: 1977
- Genre: Latin rock, funk, soul
- Label: Ariola, Atco

Barrabás chronology
Watch Out (1975)	Barrabás (1977)	Piel de Barrabás (1981)

Alternative cover

Barrabás is the sixth album by the Spanish group Barrabás, released in 1977. It was the last album before the group's four-year hiatus, and the last to feature several band members including Ricky Morales, Juan Vidal and Daniel Louis. American jazz musician Herbie Mann featured in the recording of the album, after his hit cover of Barrabás' song "Hi Jack", which was released earlier that year. Also appearing was American saxophonist Michael Brecker.

The album is sometimes known as Swinger, after the opening track. The album was later re-released on CD as Watch-Out with a similar sleeve, but is not related to the other Barrabás album of that name, the 1975 release, Watch Out.

"Swinger" / "Week End" was released as a single.

== Track listing ==
1. "Swinger" (Fernando Arbex) – 4:55
2. "Movin' On" (Ernesto Duarte) – 4:30
3. "Turn Me Love" (Enrique Morales) – 4:48
4. "Oldie" (Duarte, E. Morales, Miguel Morales) – 5:10
5. "Week End" (E. Morales, M. Morales) – 4:42
6. "Do It" (M. Morales) – 4:09
7. "Sweet and Mellow" (E. Morales) – 4:48
8. "Love Is in the Air" (M. Morales) – 4:10

== Personnel ==
- José Luís Tejada – lead vocals on tracks 1–3
- Enrique "Ricky" Morales – lead guitar, backing vocals
- Miguel Morales – guitar, bass guitar, backing vocals, lead vocals on track 8
- Ernesto "Tito" Duarte – saxophone, flute, percussion, bass guitar
- Juan Vidal – keyboards, backing vocals
- Daniel Louis – drums, percussion
- Herbie Mann – flute on track 1
- Michael Brecker – saxophone on track 6
- Ray Gomez – guitar on track 2
- Produced by Fernando Arbex
- Recorded at Atlantic Studios, New York

== Release information ==
- Spain – Ariola Eurodisc
- Disconforme DISC 1988CD (2001 CD) as Watch-Out
