= A Tom Moulton Mix =

Compilation album by Tom Moulton
- Released: 2006
- Genre: Disco
- Length: 115:35
- Label: Soul Jazz
- Producers: Tom Moulton, Frank Wilson, Leonard Caston Jr., Isaac Hayes, Larry La Falce, Len Boone, Don Cypher, Anthony Monn
- Compilers: Romain Tassinari and Aldrick de Narp

A Tom Moulton Mix is a 2006 compilation released by Soul Jazz Records. The album contains disco music that had been mixed by Tom Moulton, ranging from artists from such as Eddie Kendricks, Andrea True Connection, Isaac Hayes, and Grace Jones. The tracks are predominantly pulled from unreleased, acetate and promotional singles of several artists.

On its release, the album was praised by several music critics from The Guardian, Exclaim! and The Stranger, with Linhardt of Pitchfork calling it "simply some of the most electrifying music of the 1970s." and Andy Kellman declaring it "one of the finest disco compilations".

== Background and music ==
A Tom Moulton Mix was the first ever compilation of tracks mixed by Tom Moulton. Several of the tracks on the album were unreleased versions such as "Keep on Truckin" by Kendricks, "I'll Be Holding On" by Al Downing and "Free Man" by South Shore Commission.

The albums cover was taken in 1977 at the first anniversary party of West End Records. The back row features Maye James and Grace Jones while the front row features Mel Cheren, Tamiko Jones and Moulton.

== Release and reception ==
Professional ratings
Review scores
Source	Rating
AllMusic	4.5/5 stars
The Guardian	4/5 stars
Pitchfork Media	(8.7/10)
The Stranger	3.5/4 stars
Stylus Magazine	A

A Tom Moulton Mix was released in 2006. It was released as a double compact disc and on two double vinyl releases by Soul Jazz Records. John Brugess of The Guardian praised the album, stating that "artists graced with a Tom Moulton mix could expect their concise pop to be turned into an epic drama" and proclaimed that "Moulton had a good sense of when to hold back (Patti Jo's Make Me Believe In You is stripped and urgent) but also knew that disco floors often relished going over the top: MFSB's Love is the Message sounds like John Williams conducting a choir of cartwheeling angels." Andy Beta of The Stranger echoed praise of Moulton's mixes, finding that under Moulton's guidance, "almost any component of a song could mutate and overtake the original, from the Indian toms on BT Express's "Peace Pipe" and MFSB's orchestral opulence on "Love Is the Message" right down to the tangy banjo from Al Downing's "I'll Be Holding On." Such expansions remain prescient, transcendent, and, well, timeless." Alex Linhardt of Pitchfork proclaimed the structure of the album had "the complexity and elegance [that ]is nearly overwhelming throughout Soul Jazz's two-disc set." concluding that the compilation is "simply some of the most electrifying music of the 1970s." Andy Kellman of AllMusic proclaimed the album as "one of the finest disco compilations" and that "it just so happens that it was put together to honor the work of a pioneer who played as much of a role in the development of dance music as any songwriter, producer, session musician, vocalist, or DJ." Beyond the music, David Dacks of Exclaim! praised the compilation, noting that Soul Jazz Records had "done a tremendous job with this package", praising the liner notes cataloguing Moulton's career and work between 1974 and 1980.

From later reviews, Barry Walters included the album in his list of "Essentials" for Disco music for Spin in 2008. Bill Brewster and Frank Broughton wrote in Mixmag in 2012 that the album was a "brilliant compilation" and that it gather Moulton's "biggest and best mixes".

== Track listing ==
Track listing adapted from back of vinyl sleeve and liner notes.

Disc 1

No.	Title	Writer(s)	Credited Performer	Length
1.	"Keep on Truckin'"	Anita Poree, Leonard Caston, Frank Wilson	Eddie Kendricks	11:14
2.	"I'll Be Holding On"	Lance Quinn, Al Downing, Andrew Smith	Al Downing	2:58
3.	"Peace Pipe"	Sam Taylor, Mark Barkan	BT Express	5:58
4.	"Dreamworld"	Douglas Bright, Spencer Casey	Don Downing	4:35
5.	"Make Me Believe in You"	Curtis Mayfield	Patti Jo	7:12
6.	"Needing You"	Chuck Jackson, Marvin Yancy	Clara Lewis	4:32
7.	"Free Man"	Bunny Sigler, Ron Tyson	South Shore Commission	7:19
8.	"You've Got the Power"		Camouflage	7:44

Disc 2

No.	Title	Writer(s)	Credited Performer	Length
1.	"More, More, More"	Gregg Diamond	Andrea True Connection	6:17
2.	"Feel the Need in Me"	Abrim Tilmon	Detroit Emeralds	7:02
3.	"Moonboots"	Monn, Zauner	Orlando Riva Sound	9:31
4.	"Love is the Message"	Kenneth Gamble, Leon Huff	MFSB	11:27
5.	"Won't You Try"		Udell	5:34
6.	"La Vie en rose"	E. Gassion, L Guglielmi, D. Mack	Grace Jones	7:26
7.	"Moonlight Loving"	Isaac Hayes	Isaac Hayes	9:58
8.	"Lip Service"	Len Boone, Larry La Falce	The Lover	5:42

== Credits ==
Credits adapted from the liner notes of the compilation album.

- Tom Moulton – mixing, producer (on "La vie en rose" and "Moonboots")
- Frank Wilson – producer (on "Keep on Truckin'")
- Leonard Caston Jr. – producer (on "Keep on Truckin'")
- Isaac Hayes – producer (on "Moonlight Loving")
- Larry La Falce – producer (on "Lip Service")
- Len Boone – producer (on "Lip Service")
- Don Cypher – producer (on "Lip Service")
- Anthony Monn – producer (on "Moonboots")
- Duke Williams – arrangements (on "La vie en rose")
- Romain Tassinari – compiler, sleeve notes
- Aldrick de Narp – compiler, sleeve notes
- Adrian Self – sleeve
- Rodney Rex III – sleeve
- Pete Reilly – mastering
- Duncan Cowell – mastering
