= Let the Music Take Your Mind =

Single by Kool & the Gang

from the album Kool and the Gang
- B-side: "Chocolate Buttermilk"
- Released: 1969
- Genre: Funk
- Length: 2:50
- Label: De-Lite
- Songwriters: Gene Redd, Kool & the Gang
- Producer: Kool & the Gang

Kool & the Gang singles chronology
"Kool's Back Again" (1969)	"Let the Music Take Your Mind" (1969)	"Kool It (Here Comes the Fuzz)" (1970)

Audio video
- "Let the Music Take Your Mind" on YouTube

"Let the Music Take Your Mind" is a R&B/funk song recorded by the band Kool & the Gang for their 1969 album Kool and the Gang. It was produced by Gene Redd and written by Redd along with Kool & the Gang. Released as a single, the song peaked at No. 19 on the US Billboard Hot Soul Singles chart.

== Critical reception ==
Cheo Hodari Coker of the Los Angeles Times exclaimed "Songs such as 'Let the Music Take Your Mind' and 'Chocolate Buttermilk' melt the artificial barriers between R&B and jazz."

== Legacy ==
"Let the Music Take Your Mind" has been sampled by artists such as the Beastie Boys on "Lay It on Me" from their 1989 album Paul's Boutique and Ice Cube on his 1990 album AmeriKKKa's Most Wanted. The tune's B-side, "Chocolate Buttermilk", has been sampled by Special Ed on "Ready 2 Attack" from his 1990 album Legal and Eric B and Rakim on "Keep 'Em Eager to Listen" and "No Omega", both from their 1990 album Let the Rhythm Hit 'Em.

== Charts ==
Chart (1973)	Peak position
US Billboard Hot 100	78
US Hot R&B/Hip-Hop Songs (Billboard)	19
