= Piel de Barrabás =

Studio album by Barrabás
- Released: 1981
- Recorded: 1981
- Genres: Latin rock, disco
- Labels: Columbia Records, TXS-3214
- Producers: Fernando Arbex, Jordi Soley

Barrabás chronology
Barrabás (1977)	Piel de Barrabás (1981)	Bestial (1982)

Piel de Barrabás is a 1981 album by the Spanish group Barrabás. It was the band's seventh album and the first after the band's four-year break. It marked the return of drummer José María Moll, and the arrival of new members Armando Pelayo, Susy Gordaliza and Koky Maning.

A song inspired by the Cold War, "Please Mr Reagan, Please Mr Breznev", was released as a single in some countries, with "Laura" as the B-side. "On the Road Again" was also a single, with "Hard Line for a Dreamer" as the B-side, and this reached #9 in the Swiss charts.

== Track listing ==
1. "On the Road Again" (Fernando Arbex) – 5:52
2. "What's Happened" (Arbex, Jorge Eduardo Maning) – 4:04
3. "Hard Line for a Dreamer" (Arbex, Jesús Moll, José María Moll) – 4:45
4. "Please Mr Reagan, Please Mr Breznev" (Arbex) – 5:53
5. "Wild Cat" (Arbex) – 4:49
6. "Jeronimo" (Arbex) – 5:20
7. "Be the Way to Be" (Arbex, Jesús Gordaliza) – 3:39
8. "Laura" (Arbex, Moll, Moll) – 5:02

== Personnel ==
- José Luis Tejada – vocals, harmonica
- Jorge Eduardo "Koky" Maning – guitar, vocals
- Jesús "Susy" Gordaliza – bass guitar, vocals
- Ernesto "Tito" Duarte - saxophone, flute, percussion
- Armando Pelayo – keyboards
- José María Moll – drums, vocals
- Nani Prosper, Naomi Hussey, Mari Jamison, Paula Nerea – chorus vocals
- Fernando Arbex, Jordi Soley – production
- Engineer – Luís Calleja
- Mixed by Jame Rathbone
- Photography – Peter Müller
- Design – Juan Aboli
- Recorded at Kirios Studios, Madrid

=== Release information ===
- Spain – Discos Columbia (RCA) TXS-3214
- Disconforme DISC 1996CD (2000 CD, re-released 2004)

=== References ===
- Entry at Allmusic
- Album sleeve notes
