= Prohibido =

1983 album by Barrabás

Studio album by Barrabás
- Released: 1983
- Recorded: 1983
- Genre: Latin rock, disco
- Label: CBS Records
- Producer: Fernando Arbex, José María Moll

Barrabás chronology
Bestial (1982)	Prohibido (1983)	Barrabás Power – Abraxa (1994)

Prohibido, titled Forbidden in some countries, is a 1983 music album by the Spanish group Barrabás. It was the band's ninth album, and the last for several years before a return to recording in the 1990s.

With the return of former members Iñaki Egaña, Miguel Morales and Tito Duarte, it was described by AllMusic's Andy Kellman as "a very slight improvement" over the previous two albums. He praised the musicianship as "top-notch and professional", but criticised the vocals and lyrics, singling out "Sex Surprise Big Surprise" as the worst example.

== Track listing ==
1. "Saint Valentine" (Fernando Arbex) – 5:05
2. "Hollywood Ten O'Clock at Night" (Arbex, Miguel Morales) – 4:39
3. "I Need Your Lovin'" (Morales) – 3:40
4. "Inside of Me" (José María Moll, Morales) – 3:56
5. "Hello Hello (7th Ave/54th)" (Arbex, Morales) – 4:44
6. "Sex Surprise Big Surprise" (Arbex, Moll) – 5:45
7. "Lovers in the Rain" (Arbex, Morales) – 5:36
8. "Black Cotton Plantation" (Arbex, Jorge Eduardo Maning) – 5:00
9. ""Heroine" Stop the Horse" (Arbex) – 5:20

== Personnel ==
- Miguel Morales – guitar, vocals
- Iñaki Egaña – bass guitar, vocals
- Tito Duarte – percussion, drums
- José María Moll – drums, vocals, production

with

- Juan Aboli, Andrea Bronston, Luis Cobos, Javier Losada, Pepe Robles
- Fernando Arbex – production

=== Release information ===
- Spain – Discos CBS S25878

=== References ===
- Album sleeve notes
