= Tito Duarte =

Cuban musician

Ernesto Duarte Hernández known as Tito Duarte (August 7, 1946, in Havana, Cuba – July 14, 2003, in Córdoba, Spain), was a Cuban musician, instrumentalist and arranger.

== Artistic career ==
Tito Duarte was the son of composer and director Ernesto Duarte Brito, who worked with artists such as Benny Moré and Celia Cruz, as well as working as a director in record companies in the middle of the 20th century. The Duartes left Cuba and settled in Madrid after Fidel Castro's revolution. His father worked for the RCA label, while he, who had already played with his father's orchestra in Cuba, revealed himself as an instrumentalist and arranger.

Tito Duarte played percussions, sax, flutes, keyboards, bass, and was also an arranger for songs of various bands, such as Barrabás (founded by Fernando Arbex), and Miguel Ríos' band (Concierto de Rock y Amor, 1972).

His musical interest led him to later share the stage with jazz musicians such as Carles Benavent, Josep Mas "Kitflus", Jorge Pardo, Max Sunyer and Vlady Bas. He worked as a studio musician and recorded solo albums that ranged from the commercial popurris of Un directo... al sabor (RCA, 1981) to La fusión eléctrica de Tito Duarte (RCA, 1979), a danceable jazz album also known as I am your boss. In 2000 he released his album One man salsa. He worked with singer-songwriter Joan Manuel Serrat on some of his albums (En tránsito, Cansiones) and as a musician on his tours.

In the summer of 2003, Tito Duarte was producing the solo edition of his album La herencia del viejo sabor (Fundación Autor, 2004), a journey through the mambo, danzón and other historical forms of Cuban music, with performances by instrumentalists such as Jorge Pardo, Pepe Ébano, Vicente Borland, Víctor Merlo, Horacio Icasto and Luis Dulzaides and the voices of singers that Tito Duarte had previously joined: Moncho, Miguel Bosé, Lucrecia, Reinaldo Craig or Ángela Carrasco. He had committed himself to sing the song Suavecito, but the day before the recording he died suddenly in Córdoba with the album almost finished, so it was published as a tribute.

When he died at the age of 56 in Córdoba, he was involved in the live show of Sueños de ida y vuelta, the flamenco project of Víctor Monge "Serranito", at the Cordoba Guitar Festival. During the rehearsals he felt sick and was admitted to the Reina Sofia hospital, where he died, according to the doctors, as a consequence of a heart attack. After his death he has been remembered and featured many times on Spanish Radio 3, the popular public music channel of that country, in many programs such as Discópolis, Sonideros and Trópico Utópico.

== Discography ==
=== With Barrabás ===
- Wild Safari, 1971 (AKA Barrabás)
- Power, 1973
- ¡Soltad a Barrabás!, 1974 (AKA Release Barrabás or Hi-Jack)
- Heart of the City, 1975 (AKA Check Mate)
- Watch Out, 1975 (AKA Desperately)
- Barrabás, 1976 (AKA Swinger or Watch-Out)
- Prohibido, 1983

=== Solo ===
- I Am the Boss, RCA Victor, 1979
- Un Directo... Al Sabor, RCA, 1981
- One Man Salsa, 2000
- La Herencia Del Viejo Sabor, Factoría Autor, 2004

==== Singles and EPs ====
- "Wild Party" / "Kiss Me Now Baby", RCA, 1980
- "Merengues - Guajiras", RCA Victor, 1981
