= Funky Man =

Funky Man may refer to:

- Funky Man (Dee Dee King song)
- Funky Man (Kool & the Gang song)
