= Wild Safari =

Studio album by Barrabás
- Released: 1971 (Spain), January 1972 (International)
- Recorded: 1971
- Genre: Latin rock
- Label: RCA Records

Barrabás chronology
Wild Safari (1971)	Power (1973)

Wild Safari is a 1971 album by the Spanish group Barrabás, released outside Spain in January 1972. The album was released in some countries under the simple title Barrabás, with a different sleeve design. It was also known as Música Caliente after its subtitle on the back sleeve.

The tracks "Woman" and "Wild Safari" were released as singles in various countries, and "Woman" became a club hit in Europe, Canada and the USA.

"Wild Safari" was used as the background music for a major scene in HBO's 2016 'Vinyl' series. (Season 1, Episode 8)

== Track listing ==
1. "Wild Safari" (Fernando Arbex) – 5:01
2. "Try and Try" (Arbex) – 6:15
3. "Only for Men" (Arbex, Enrique Morales) – 3:32
4. "Never in This World" (Arbex) – 3:27
5. "Woman" (Arbex) – 5:04
6. "Cheer Up" (E. Morales) – 3:51
7. "Rock and Roll Everybody" (Arbex, E. Morales, Miguel Morales) – 3:40
8. "Chicco" (E. Morales) – 3:42

== Personnel ==
- Iñaki Egaña – lead vocals, bass guitar
- Enrique "Ricky" Morales – lead guitar, backing vocals
- Miguel Morales – rhythm guitar, bass guitar, backing vocals
- Ernesto "Tito" Duarte – saxophone, flute, percussion
- Juan Vidal – keyboards
- Fernando Arbex – drums, backing vocals, production

=== Release information ===
- Spain – RCA Victor SAM1957
- USA – RCA APL1-0219 (1972)
- France – RCA 443.043 (1972) (Different sleeve)
- Disconforme DISC 1991CD (2000 CD)

== Chart performance ==
Chart (1972)	Peak position
Spanish Album Charts	8
