= Live at the Sex Machine =

Live album by Kool and the Gang
- Released: February 1971
- Recorded: May 1970
- Genre: Funk
- Length: 48:26
- Label: De-Lite
- Producer: Gene Redd

Kool and the Gang chronology
Kool and the Gang (1969)	Live at the Sex Machine (1971)	Live at PJ's (1971)

Professional ratings
Review scores
Source	Rating
AllMusic	4/5 stars
Los Angeles Times	4/4 stars
The Virgin Encyclopedia of R&B and Soul	2/5 stars

Live at the Sex Machine is the first live album released by the funk band Kool and the Gang. The album was released in 1971, and reached No. 6 on the Billboard R&B Albums chart. Not only was it a Top 10 album, it stayed on the chart for 33 weeks; an impressive time span compared to most albums of the era. Although the band's huge success would not come until a few albums later, this release was popular with the R&B market. Like most of their early catalog, it was sampled by several artists during hip-hop's "Golden Era" of the 1980s and early 1990s. The track "Funky Man" was sampled in "Smack My Bitch Up" by the Prodigy.

== Track listing ==
Side I
No.	Title	Writer(s)	Length
1.	"What Would the World Be Like Without Music / Let the Music Take Your Mind"	Kool & the Gang, Gene Redd	4:29
2.	"Walk on By"	Burt Bacharach, Hal David	5:15
3.	"Chocolate Buttermilk"	Kool & the Gang, Redd	2:09
4.	"Trying to Make a Fool of Me"	Thom Bell, William Hart	4:29
5.	"Who's Gonna Take the Weight"	Kool & the Gang, Redd	6:20

Side II
No.	Title	Writer(s)	Length
1.	"Pneumonia"	Kool & the Gang, Redd	5:22
2.	"Wichita Lineman"	Jimmy Webb	5:27
3.	"I Want to Take You Higher"	Sylvester Stewart	4:13
4.	"Funky Man"	Kool & the Gang, Redd	3:24
5.	"Touch of You"	Eddie Jackson, Jerry Jones	4:14

CD release bonus track
No.	Title	Writer(s)	Length
11.	"Kool It (Here Comes the Fuzz)"	Kool & the Gang, Redd	2:58

== Personnel ==
Kool and the Gang

- Robert "Spike" Mickens – trumpet
- Claydes Smith – guitar
- Ricky Westfield – piano, organ
- Ronald Bell – tenor saxophone, music director
- George Brown – drums
- Dennis Thomas – alto saxophone
- Robert "Kool" Bell – bass guitar

Additional personnel

- Gene Redd – producer, arranger
- Malcolm Addey – engineer
- Gene Redd Sr. – editing
- Douglas Flake – art direction, design
- Elliot Kaufman – photography
- Carl Hall – vocal background supervision
