= ¡Soltad a Barrabás! =

Studio album by Barrabás
- Released: 1974
- Recorded: 1973–74
- Genre: Latin rock, funk, soul
- Label: Ariola Records

Barrabás chronology
Power (1973)	¡Soltad a Barrabás! (1974)	Heart of the City (1975)

¡Soltad a Barrabás! is the third album by the Spanish group Barrabás, released in 1974. The album was originally released as Release Barrabás or Hi-Jack in some other countries, but the modern CD release retains the Spanish title. It was the first album recorded outside their native Spain.

"Hi-Jack" / "Lady Love" was released as a single, reached No. 1 in Spain, but only made the Bubbling Under Hot 100 Charts in the U.S., peaking as high as No. 104 over there, however, the song was successfully covered by American jazz musician Herbie Mann in 1975, in which his version became the much bigger hit success in the U.S.

== Track listing ==
1. "Hi-Jack" (Fernando Arbex) – 5:46
2. "Mad Love" (Arbex) – 4:15
3. "Funky Baby" (Enrique Morales, Miguel Morales) – 3:56
4. "Lady Love" (E. Morales) – 4:14
5. "Susie Wong" (Arbex) – 4:32
6. "Humanity" (José María Moll, Jesús Moll) – 3:24
7. "Tell Me the Thing" (Ernesto Duarte) – 3:18
8. "Fly Away" (M. Morales, José Luís Tejada) – 4:26
9. "Concert" (E. Morales, M. Morales, David Waterston) – 4:15

== Personnel ==
- José Luís Tejada – lead vocals (1, 2, 5–9)
- Enrique "Ricky" Morales – lead and acoustic guitars, lead (3 & 4) and backing vocals
- Miguel Morales – bass guitar, acoustic guitar, lead (3 & 4) and backing vocals
- Ernesto "Tito" Duarte – saxophone, flute, percussion, drums
- Juan Vidal – keyboards
- José María Moll – drums
- "The Waters" (Maxine, Julia & Patti) – backing vocals
- Produced by Fernando Arbex
- Recorded at MGM Polydor Studios, Hollywood
- Sound engineer – Humberto Gatica
- Sleeve design – Miquel A. López Parras

=== Release information ===
- Spain – Ariola Eurodisc 87912
- France – Eurodisc 87912 (as Hi-Jack)
- USA& – Atco SD 36-110 / Atlantic ATC 9580 (as Hi-Jack)
- Disconforme DISC 1994CD (2000 CD)
