= Bestial (album) =

Studio album by Barrabás
- Released: 1982
- Recorded: 1982
- Genre: Latin rock, disco
- Label: Columbia Records
- Producer: Fernando Arbex, José María Moll

Barrabás chronology
Piel de Barrabás (1981)	Bestial (1982)	Prohibido (1983)

Bestial is an album by the Spanish group Barrabás, released in 1982. It was the band's eighth and penultimate album, and the last to feature several members including long-time vocalist José Luís Tejada.

The opening track, "The Lion (Don't Kill the Lion)", was released as a single, and reached number 54 on the German chart in June 1982.

== Track listing ==
1. "The Lion (Don't Kill the Lion)" (Fernando Arbex) – 6:24
2. "Lover of the Night" (José Maria Moll, José Luis Tejada) – 4:10
3. "Viva Maria" (Arbex) – 5:56
4. "Dolores" (Arbex) – 5:08
5. "(Be My) Rebel" (Arbex) – 6:30
6. "Love & Hate" (Jesús Gordaliza, Tejada) – 4:08
7. "So Long" (Moll, Tejada) – 2:55
8. "Leather Queen" (Arbex, Armando Pelayo) – 3:57
9. "Big Brother" (Jorge Eduardo Maning) – 4:17

== Personnel ==
- José Luis Tejada – vocals, harmonica
- Jorge Eduardo "Koky" Maning – guitar, vocals
- Jesús "Susy" Gordaliza – bass guitar, vocals
- Armando Pelayo – keyboards
- José María Moll – drums, vocals
- Fernando Arbex – production
- Sound engineer – Hans Menzel
- Sleeve design – Juan Aboli
- Recorded at Musicland Studios and Kristian Schultze Studios, Munich

=== Release information ===
- Spain – Discos Columbia (RCA) TXS-3248
- Disconforme DISC 1997CD (2000 CD, re-released 2004)
