= Live at PJ's =

Live album by Kool and the Gang
- Released: October 1971
- Recorded: 29 May 1971
- Venues: P.J.'s, West Hollywood
- Genres: Funk, soul jazz
- Length: 46:06
- Label: De-Lite
- Producer: Gene Redd

Kool and the Gang chronology
Live at the Sex Machine (1971)	Live at PJ's (1971)	Music Is the Message (1972)

Professional ratings
Review scores
Source	Rating
AllMusic	4.5/5 stars
Record Mirror	(favourable)
(The New) Rolling Stone Album Guide	3/5 stars

Live at PJ's is the second live album by the funk band Kool and the Gang, released in 1971. It was recorded at P.J.'s, a popular nightclub and music venue in West Hollywood, California, that operated from 1961 to 1973.

== Track listing ==
Side 1
No.	Title	Writer(s)	Length
1.	"N.T."	Gene Redd, Gene Redd Jr., Cleveland Horne, Roy Handy, Kool and the Gang	6:29
2.	"Ricksonata"	Kool and the Gang	5:39
3.	"Sombrero Sam"	Charles Lloyd	6:42
4.	"Ronnie's Groove"	Redd, Kool and the Gang	2:57

Side 2
No.	Title	Writer(s)	Length
1.	"Ike's Mood"	Isaac Hayes	5:01
2.	"You've Lost That Loving Feeling"	Barry Mann, Cynthia Weil, Phil Spector	4:59
3.	"Lucky for Me"	Charles Smith	3:02
4.	"Dujii"	Rick Westfield	6:02

The track "N.T." (short for "No Title") was replaced with "The Penguin" on the UK LP.

The 1999 CD release combined "Ike's Mood" and "You've Lost That Loving Feeling" into one track and included both "N.T." and "The Penguin".

== Personnel ==
Kool and the Gang

- Robert "Kool" Bell – bass guitar
- Ronald Bell – tenor and soprano saxophone
- George Brown – drums
- Robert "Spike" Mickens – trumpet, bongos
- Dennis Thomas – alto saxophone, flute, congas
- Claydes Smith – guitar
- Ricky West – electric piano, organ, tambourine

Additional studio strings

- Selwart Clark – violin
- Gayle Dixon – violin
- Nina Simon – violin
- Winston Collymore – violin
- Warren La Fredo – viola
- Kermit Moore – cello

Technical personnel

- Gene Redd, Jr. – producer, arranger
- Malcolm Addey – engineer
- Gene Redd, Sr. – copyist, editing
