= Watch Out (Barrabás album) =

Studio album by Barrabás
- Released: 1975, 1976 (USA)
- Recorded: 1975
- Genre: Latin rock, funk, soul
- Label: Ariola, Atco

Barrabás chronology
Heart of the City (1975)	Watch Out (1975)	Barrabás (1977)

Alternative cover

Watch Out is the fifth album by the Spanish group Barrabás, released in 1975. The album was later re-released on CD in Spain as Desperately.

The girl posing on the cover of the album is Ellen Michaels.

"Desperately" / "Broadway Star" was released as a single, although "It" was the B-side in some countries.

Barrabás' next album, Barrabás, was re-released on CD under the title Watch-Out, but is unrelated to this album.

== Track listing ==
1. "Broadway Star" (Fernando Arbex) – 3:59
2. "It" (Arbex) – 3:57
3. "Fire Girl" (Enrique Morales) – 5:05
4. "Desperately" (Arbex) – 5:20
5. "High Light" (Ernesto Duarte, E. Morales, Miguel Morales) – 4:20
6. "Sexy Lady" (M. Morales) – 4:40
7. "Better Days" (Duarte, José Luís Tejada) – 4:25
8. "Lay It Down on Me" (M. Morales) – 4:25
- "It" was renamed "Take It All" on the Desperately CD version of the album.
- "Lay It Down on Me" is sometime erroneously shown as "Lay Down on Me".

== Personnel ==
- José Luís Tejada – lead vocals, percussion
- Enrique "Ricky" Morales – lead guitar, vocals on tracks 6 & 8
- Miguel Morales – guitar, bass guitar, vocals
- Ernesto "Tito" Duarte – saxophone, flute, percussion, bass guitar, keyboards
- Juan Vidal – keyboards, vocals
- Daniel Louis – drums, percussion
- Produced by Fernando Arbex
- Recorded at Atlantic Studios, New York
- Sound engineer – Jim Douglas
- Sleeve design – Toni Gayán

=== Release information ===
- Spain – Ariola Eurodisc
- Germany – Ariola 27 682 XOT
- USA & Canada – Atco SD 36-136 (1976)
- Disconforme DISC 1990CD (2001 CD) as Desperately

=== References ===
- Entry at Allmusic
- Album cover / sleeve notes
