= Funky Man (Kool & the Gang song) =

Single by Kool & the Gang

from the album Live at the Sex Machine
- B-side: "1-2-3-4-5-6-7-8"
- Released: 1970
- Genre: Funk
- Length: 3:03
- Label: De-Lite
- Songwriters: Gene Redd, Kool & the Gang
- Producer: Gene Redd

Kool & the Gang singles chronology
"Kool It (Here Comes the Fuzz)" (1970)	"Funky Man" (1970)	"Who's Gonna Take the Weight (Part One)" (1971)

Audio video
- "Funky Man" (Live) on YouTube

"Funky Man" is a R&B/funk song recorded by the band Kool & the Gang from, Live at the Sex Machine, their 1970 live album. Released as a single, the song peaked at No. 16 on the US Billboard Hot Soul Singles chart.

== Compendium ==
Funky Man was produced by Gene Redd who also wrote the song with Kool & the Gang. The single version's B-side was a tune entitled "1-2-3-4-5-6-7-8".

== Charts ==
Chart (1970)	Peak position
US Billboard Hot 100	87
US Hot Soul Singles (Billboard)	16

== Legacy ==
Funky Man was sampled by Public Enemy on Night of the Living Baseheads from the group's 1988 album It Takes a Nation of Millions to Hold Us Back. The song was sampled by EPMD on Underground from their 1990 album Business as Usual.
