= Maye James-Holler =

American music executive (1941–2025)

Maye (Hampton) James-Holler (March 11, 1941-December 8, 2025) was a pioneering figure in the American music industry. She was one of the first Black women record company executives, with a career that spans decades and genres. James-Holler's ascent and career path were covered regularly in the music trade publications Cashbox, Billboard, and Record World.

== Work with Mary Wells ==
In her late teens, Maye James-Holler (then Maye Hampton), was a close friend of Mary Wells in Detroit, Michigan, hanging out and going to dances together at the Greystone Ballroom. As Wells's singing career took off with the single "Bye Bye Baby" for Motown in 1960, James-Holler became Wells' personal assistant, stylist, and road manager. She shopped for Wells' stage clothing and learned to do her hair, dyeing it blonde, a color that became a signature style for Wells along with red. James described Wells during this period as down-to-earth, enjoying her success but "always herself, so real and humble." When The Beatles asked Wells, their favorite American singer, to be their opener on the European leg of their 1964 world tour James-Holler accompanied her. While on tour, members of The Beatles would sometimes hide out in Wells's dressing room and listen to records with her and James-Holler, taking a break from their sudden fame.

Later that year, when Wells was thinking of leaving Motown because she was being underpaid, James-Holler urged Wells to renegotiate her contract instead, after her biggest hit "My Guy." Wells eventually decided to leave Motown later on in 1964, and struggled to release music for many years afterward. James-Holler was together with Wells when they first heard The Supremes' "Where Did Our Love Go" on the radio, a song that Motown had previously earmarked for Wells. James-Holler accompanied Wells to New York City, while Wells recorded her first post-Motown songs at Capitol Records Studios and Bell Studios. as she worked to sign with another label. Wells eventually signed with 20th Century Fox and received a $250,000 advance, which enabled her to buy an apartment at 1245 Park Avenue. James-Holler lived with her there, and the two explored the city together while Wells recorded new material. Wells was released from 20th Century Fox in 1965 and signed with Atco in 1966. After a succession of label deals and records that failed ro chart, Wells struggled throughout her career to regain her earlier success. Though the two parted ways professionally when James-Holler took a position at Scepter Records in 1970, they remained lifelong friends until Wells' death from cancer in 1992.

== Music Industry Career ==
After her time learning the industry ropes working with Wells, James-Holler started at Scepter Records in 1970, as an assistant in promotion and sales. She served a liaison between the label and the trades and was responsible for promoting Scepter releases to radio stations across the country. She was promoted to National Director of R & B in March 1974, the first Black woman at any label to hold this position. Scepter added heading artist relations to her duties later that year. James-Holler worked with R&B artists The Independents and singer Dionne Warwick, among many others while at Scepter. She is credited as "Promotion [Spiritual And Promotional Support" on BT Express's 1975 release Non-Stop. In 1976, James-Holler left took a position at a new record label called Desert Moon as Vice President in charge of national promotion.

By 1977 she had left Desert Moon to work as Vice President of Promotions at Roadshow Records based in New York City. James was the first Black woman to hold this position in the music industry. Roadshow was home to artists Tina Turner, BT Express, Brass Construction, Enchantment, and Morning, Noon, and Night. James-Holler was noted for her innovative promotion of gospel singer Shirley Caesar's first Roadshow release First Lady, even hand carrying records to gospel stations across the country. She also promoted the 12-inch extended Brazilian disco mix of the Broadway play Saravá.

In August 1978 she shared her expertise at Billboard's International Radio Programming Forum on a panel on "Black Radio--The Exciting Evolution" with WBLS program director Hal Jackson. At the panel, James-Holler discussed the splintering of Black radio audiences and the changing media landscape: "Wherever go I find the same problems at black stations," she said, "AM can't compete with FM."

In 1979 she left Roadshow, forming her own independent promotion company, Nouveau Monde Promotions, Ltd., which had offices on Broadway in Manhattan. James-Holler served as Nouveau Monde's president and began with Chic, Chanson, Linda Evans and Ullanda McCoullough on its roster. James-Holler was Ullanda's manager during the time of her 1981 Atlantic Records label debut, Ullanda McCoullough. Nouveau Monde also worked with the promotions company Record Logic to publicize R & B artists; their CEO Tom Cossie called James "the best in the business."

In the 1980s, James-Holler also worked as Assistant Program Director and Music Director at WBLS for five years. James-Holler managed the programming staff and brought new artists to the airwaves. While at WBLS, James-Holler helped break Hip Hop into the mainstream by suggesting to DJ and Program Director Frankie Crocker, not himself a fan of rap, that he hire Mr. Magic at the station after she kept catching her teenage daughter Crystal James-Goodwin staying up late to hear his 2 am show on WBAI.

In 1986, James-Holler moved to AMI Management. At that time, AMI had New Edition on its roster as well as the System, Colonel Abrams, and Ready For The World. After her time at AMI, James-Holler took a position at the all-in-one production/marketing/promotion company Palm Tree Enterprises to head the promotions division, called Mayvan Marketing, which marketed records nationally to radio stations in Black and urban markets. Independent record label SBK brought James-Holler in as the General Manager of its R & B/Urban Music division in 1989, with the mission to set up regional promotions staff and "to leave a mark on the industry". In her first year at SBK, James-Holler was instrumental in breaking the House hit Technotronic, with their debut hit "Pump Up the Jam," which entered the Billboard charts at number 75. "Pump Up the Jam" has been called the first Eurodance hit in the United States.

In 2006, the UK soul label released the first ever compilation of Tom Moulton's disco hits, A Tom Moulton Mix, which featured James-Holler on the cover alongside Grace Jones in a 1977 photo taken at a party for West End Records' first anniversary.

== Awards ==
In 1975, Maye James-Holler was honored by the Jesse Jackson-founded Operation PUSH at their annual "Family Affair" gala as one of the top 100 women working in creative, artistic, religious or professional realms. Jackson created the award to honor women who are "over-worked and under-recognized" in American society. James-Holler was also given an Honorary Tribute by the WBLS "Sure Shots" organization in 1982, alongside radio and media luminaries such as Sugar Hill Records' Sylvia Robinson.
