= Bobby Poe =

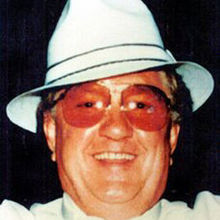
- Bobby Poe at the 25th annual and final Bobby Poe's Pop Music Survey Convention in 1996.

Background information
- Also known as: The Poe Kat
- Born: Bobby Nelson Poe; April 13, 1933; Vinita, Oklahoma, United States
- Died: January 22, 2011 (aged 77) Grove, Oklahoma, U.S.
- Genres: Rockabilly
- Occupations: Singer-Songwriter, Music Publisher, Manager, Magazine Publisher, Concert Promoter
- Instruments: Vocals, Guitar
- Years active: 1956–1996
- Labels: White Rock Records; EastWest Records
- Website: BobbyPoe.com

Bobby Nelson Poe, Sr. (April 13, 1933 – January 22, 2011), also known as The Poe Kat, was an American musician who had a long and varied career in the music business.

Bobby Poe was born in Vinita, Oklahoma. In the mid-1950s, he formed Bobby Poe and The Poe Kats, which featured African-American piano player Big Al Downing, lead guitar player Vernon Sandusky and drummer Joe Brawley. Bobby Poe and The Poe Kats were also Rockabilly Queen Wanda Jackson's first Rock and Roll backing band. They toured with Wanda and can also be found on her early Capitol Records recordings, including the Rockabilly classic "Let's Have a Party". Bobby, Wanda, Big Al and Vernon are all members of the Rockabilly Hall of Fame.

Bobby Poe and The Poe Kats came to the attention of Sam Phillips of Sun Records with their first recorded track, "Rock and Roll Record Girl". Based on the music of the old standard "Chattanooga Shoe Shine Boy", "Rock and Roll Record Girl" was at first blocked from release by Wesley Rose of Acuff-Rose because of that fact. By the time all of the legal hurdles were cleared, Sam Phillips was no longer interested in releasing the track. Instead, Dallas, Texas radio personality Jim Lowe stepped in and released the single on his White Rock Records label. "Rock and Roll Record Girl" backed with "Rock and Roll Boogie" became a number 1 single in the state of Texas.

After one more single for Jim Lowe's White Rock Records entitled "Piano Nellie", under the name of Bobby Brant and The Rhythm Rockers (which was shortly thereafter picked up and re-released by EastWest Records), Bobby Poe gave up his career as an artist to become an artist manager. His first client was Big Al Downing. In the 1960s, Poe moved to the Washington, D.C. area and expanded his operation. He managed and co-produced The Chartbusters, which featured his old bandmate Vernon Sandusky. The Chartbusters scored a Top 40 hit in 1964 with their recording "She's The One". Tom Hanks was quoted in People Magazine as saying The Chartbusters were one of the influences for his film "That Thing You Do!". Vernon Sandusky went on to play guitar in Country Music Hall of Famer Roy Clark's band for over 20 years. Bobby Poe also co-managed The British Walkers, which featured Bobby (sometimes spelled Bobbie) Howard and legendary blues guitarist Roy Buchanan.

In 1968, Poe again switched gears and started several music tip sheets for music industry insiders and radio stations. The most successful tip sheet was Pop Music Survey, which grew significantly when Poe began an annual music convention. After 25 successful conventions, Poe retired in 1996.

After his "official" retirement in 1996, he created The Grand Grove Opry in Grove, Oklahoma in 1999. This music theater at the foot of Sailboat Bridge on Grand Lake showcased local and national Country music talent. The Grand Grove Opry Radio Show was then created at virtually the same time. The Radio Show was recorded weekly and then broadcast on Sunday afternoons, exclusively on the "Grand Grove Opry Network": flagship station KITO in Vinita, Oklahoma; KIND in Independence, Kansas; and, later, KRIG in Bartlesville, Oklahoma. After new owners bought the Opry building, Mr. Poe continued to promote Country music concerts around Oklahoma, Kansas and Arkansas until 2005.

On March 7, 2009, Bobby Poe and The Poe Kats were inducted into the Kansas Music Hall of Fame.

Bobby Poe died at his home in Grove, Oklahoma on January 22, 2011. He had been diagnosed with throat cancer in 2009. Though his cancer was in remission, he grew steadily weaker during his recovery and suffered a fatal blood clot on the aforementioned date.
