= The Chartbusters =

American rock band

- Genres: Rock and roll
- Years active: 1964-1968
- Labels: Mutual Records; Crusader Records; Bell Records
- Website: TheChartbusters.com

The Chartbusters were an American rock band from Washington, D.C. The group's lone hit single was the 1964 song "She's the One", which had an 8-week chart run and peaked at #33 in August 1964 on the Billboard Hot 100. "She's the One" was released on Mutual Records after 20 other record labels had turned it down.

== Origin and recordings ==
The Chartbusters featured lead guitarist/vocalist Vernon Sandusky, who began his career with Bobby Poe and The Poe Kats. Bobby Poe was the manager and often co-producer of this new group. Starting in the 1970s, Vernon Sandusky went on to play guitar in Roy Clark's band for the next 20 years.

Additional founding members of the Chartbusters were Johnny Dubas on bass/backing vocals (who was previously a member of Big Al Downing and the Rhythm Rockers with Vernon Sandusky); Vince Gedeon on rhythm guitar/backing vocals; and Chib Holmes on drums.

The Chartbusters recorded several singles from 1964 to 1968, but none reached the sales and chart heights of "She's the One". The band's second single, "Why", made the Billboard chart, but rose only to #92. Over the relatively brief period of the band's career, the Chartbusters recorded several singles for Mutual Records, Crusader Records, and Bell Records. The band did not record an album. A compilation album of singles - along with unreleased tracks and demos - was issued on compact disc in the 1990s by the German label Eagle Records.

Although founding member Vernon Sandusky repeatedly has said it is not true, local Washington, DC legend has it that the Chartbusters also released several quickly recorded budget albums for Diplomat Records (a subsidiary of Synthetic Plastics Company) circa 1964 under the name "The Manchesters," including Beatlerama Volume 1 (Diplomat D-2307 mono and DS-2307 stereo) and Beatlerama Volume 2 (Diplomat D-2310 mono and DS-2310 stereo). These albums contained cover versions of several Beatles' songs along with (according to Sandusky) unauthorized versions of the Chartbusters' original songs/demos, including some which appeared in alternate versions on the Mutual Records singles.

== On tour ==
As a popular live band, the Chartbusters performed with many stars of the day, including The Animals, The Four Seasons, Jan and Dean, Johnny Rivers, The Lovin' Spoonful, Peter and Gordon, Chuck Berry, and Dino, Desi and Billy. Some of these artists also performed with the Chartbusters at a weekend of music held at The DC Armory in Washington, DC in April 1966, which was called "The National Teen Show". For several years during the mid-to-late 1960s, the Chartbusters were the house band at the Crazy Horse in the Georgetown section of Washington, D.C.

== Influence ==
In the 1990s, Tom Hanks was quoted in People as saying that the Chartbusters were one of the inspirations for his film That Thing You Do! In 2021, Hanks curated an hour-long DJ set to celebrate his 65th birthday. The set, titled "Songs From the Back of the Station Wagon", was created for online radio station Boss Radio 66, which specializes in playing obscure American rock and roll, surf rock and soul music from the 1950s and 1960s. The set included songs like "Hot Rod Queen" by Roy Tann from 1957 and "She's the One" by the Chartbusters. Hanks enjoyed doing the show so much that he became a regular guest host on Boss Radio 66, his "Dream N.Y.C. Radio Station". Hanks continues to play the Chartbusters' "She's the One" on his show to this day.

== Personal ==
Lead singer and guitarist Vernon Sandusky (born on June 30, 1939, in Earlham, Iowa) died at his home in Enda, Kansas, on January 25, 2020, at the age of 80.

== Original members ==
- Vernon Sandusky - lead guitar, lead vocals
- Vince Gedeon - guitar, vocals
- John Dubas - bass, vocals
- Chib Holmes - drums

== Additional members ==
- Frank Dillon - guitar, vocals
- Eddie Kopa - guitar, vocals
- Gary Kingery - drums
- Mike "Pokey" Walls - drums
- Stuart Ross - drums
- Danny Motta - drums
- Ronnie Stevens - drums
