= Kool and the Gang (album) =

Studio album by Kool & the Gang
- Released: December 1969
- Studio: Bell Sound (New York City)
- Genres: R&B; soul jazz; funk
- Length: 32:12
- Label: De-Lite
- Producer: Gene Redd

Kool & the Gang chronology
Kool and the Gang (1969)	Live at the Sex Machine (1971)

Kool and the Gang is the debut studio album by funk band Kool & the Gang, released in December 1969 on De-Lite Records It peaked at No. 43 on the Billboard R&B albums chart.

== Critical reception ==
Professional ratings
Review scores
Source	Rating
AllMusic	3.5/5 stars
(The New) Rolling Stone Album Guide	3/5 stars

JT Griffith of AllMusic said, "Though barely over a half an hour long, Kool and the Gang is a blast of a record containing strong elements that would become the band's trademarks: smooth melodies, suave rhythms, and brassy horns. This is one of Kool & the Gang's jazzier albums and a strong debut worth checking out."

== Singles ==
The singles, "Kool and the Gang" and "Let the Music Take Your Mind", both peaked at No. 19 on the Billboard Best-Selling Soul Singles chart.

== Track listing ==
De-Lite Records – DE-2003:

Side one
No.	Title	Writer(s)	Length
1.	"Kool & the Gang"	Kool and the Gang	2:54
2.	"Breeze & Soul"	Gene Redd, Kool and the Gang	5:29
3.	"Chocolate Buttermilk"	Redd, Kool and the Gang	2:14
4.	"Sea of Tranquility"	Redd, Kool and the Gang	3:34

Side two
No.	Title	Writer(s)	Length
1.	"Give It Up"	Redd, Kool and the Gang	3:40
2.	"Since I Lost My Baby"	Warren Moore, Smokey Robinson	2:08
3.	"Kool's Back Again"	Redd, Jimmy Crosby, Kool and the Gang	2:48
4.	"The Gang's Back Again"	Redd, Crosby, Kool and the Gang	2:46
5.	"Raw Hamburger"	Redd	3:36
Total length:			32:12

CD release bonus track
No.	Title	Writer(s)	Length
10.	"Let the Music Take Your Mind"	Redd, Kool and the Gang	2:58
Total length:			35:10

== Personnel ==
- Robert "Kool" Bell – bass, vocals
- Khalis Bayyan a.k.a. "Ronald Bell" – tenor and soprano saxophones, alto flute, vocals
- George "Funky" Brown – drums, percussion, vocals
- Robert "Spike" Mickens – trumpet, flugelhorn, vocals
- Claydes Smith – guitars
- Woody Sparrow – guitars
- Dennis "D.T." Thomas – alto saxophone, flute, percussion, vocals
- Ricky West – keyboards, piano, vocals

Technical

- Malcom Addey – sound engineer

Design

- Robert Golden – album design

== Singles ==
- "Kool & the Gang"/"Raw Hamburgers" (19 R&B/59 pop) (1969)
- "The Gang's Back Again"/"Kool's Back Again" (37/85) (1969)
- "Let the Music Take Your Mind"/"Chocolate Buttermilk" (19/78) (1970)
