= It Really Hurts Me Girl =

Single by The Carstairs
- B-side: "The Story of Our Love"
- Released: 1973
- Genre: Soul, funk
- Length: 3:25
- Label: Red Coach RC 802
- Songwriters: Cleveland Horne, Raymond A. Evans
- Producers: Cleveland Horne, Raymond A. Evans; Executive producer Gene Redd Jr.

"It Really Hurts Me Girl" is a song and single by American group, The Carstairs.

In the UK, DJ Ian Levine, having heard this song played on radio in Miami, acquired a copy and played it during a Northern soul event at the Blackpool Mecca in 1973. It caused controversy as it was not to the liking of those who preferred traditional Northern soul music based on a sound and rhythm similar to that traditionally emanating from the Motown label. The song is credited with stating a new musical genre that came to be known as modern soul music.

The song is rated No. 83 on the Far Outmagazine 100 greatest northern soul songs of all-time list.
