= The Carstairs =

Former American music group

- Origin: Detroit, Michigan, U.S.
- Genres: Soul, funk, modern soul
- Years active: 1969–1973
- Labels: Okeh, Red Coach
- Past members: Cleveland Horne; Ray A. Evans

The Carstairs were an American group of the 1960s and 1970s whose 1973 single, "It Really Hurts Me Girl" is credited with starting the modern soul music scene and genre.

== Modern soul ==
A male vocal group from the U.S., The Carstairs releases met with no success in their home country. In the United Kingdom, DJ Ian Levine, having heard their song "It Really Hurts Me Girl" played on radio in Miami, acquired a copy and played it during a Northern soul event at the Blackpool Mecca in 1973. It caused controversy as it was not to the liking of those who preferred traditional Northern soul music based on a sound and rhythm similar to that traditionally emanating from the Motown label. The Carstairs and their recording are credited with starting a new musical genre that came to be known as modern soul music.

The group consisted of Ray A. Evans and Cleveland Horne (April 4, 1944 – April 13, 2000) who later performed with The Fantastic Four. Few of their other recordings are known other than some cover versions they released of songs by Edwin Starr.
