= Dreaming a Dream =

Single by Crown Heights Affair

from the album Dreaming a Dream
- B-side: "Dreaming a Dream" (Disco Version)
- Released: July 1975
- Recorded: 1975
- Genre: Disco
- Length: 3:30 (7" Version); 3:45 (Disco Version); 7:17 (Full Disco Version)
- Label: De-Lite
- Songwriters: Freida Nerangis, Britt Britton
- Producers: Freida Nerangis, Britt Britton

Crown Heights Affair singles chronology
"Leave the Kids Alone" (1974)	"Dreaming a Dream" (1975)	"Every Beat of My Heart" (1975)

Dreaming a Dream is a 1975 single by New York-based group Crown Heights Affair. The single went to number-one on the Disco File Top 20 chart for one week, and was the most successful of five releases. "Dreaming a Dream" also made it to number five on the Billboard soul chart and number forty-three on the Hot 100.
