= Hi-Jack =

1974 R&B and funk disco based song

Single by Barrabás

from the album ¡Soltad a Barrabás!
- B-side: "Lady Love"
- Released: 1974
- Recorded: 1973–1974
- Genre: Disco, funk
- Length: 5:46
- Label: Ariola Records, ATCO Records (USA)
- Songwriter: Fernando Arbex

"Hi-Jack" is a 1974 song written by Spanish musician Fernando Arbex and originally recorded by his group Barrabás for their album ¡Soltad a Barrabás!. While their version of the song was a huge success in their native Spain, going all the way to Number one over there, the song flopped in America, stalling at just number No. 104 on the Bubbling Under the Billboard Hot 100 Charts in July 1975. It was later a hit single for jazz flautist Herbie Mann.

== Herbie Mann version ==
"Hi-Jack"

Single by Herbie Mann & Cissy Houston

from the album Discothèque
- B-side: "Lady Marmelade"
- Released: 1975
- Recorded: 1974
- Genre: Disco
- Length: 5:16
- Label: Atlantic Records
- Songwriter: Fernando Arbex

Herbie Mann & Cissy Houston singles chronology
| "My Girl" (1974) | "Hi-Jack" (1975) | "Waterbed" (1975) |

Mann's recording of the song featured Cissy Houston on vocals and hit number one on the US Disco Action chart for three weeks in early 1975 and made the top 30 on the R&B and pop singles charts. The song was banned on several AM radio stations because of the recent cases of hijackings in the middle East, as well as for the suggestive repeated lyric lines: "Hijack your love" and "I'm gonna steal your love".

In addition to Mann's version, the song has been covered many other artists (notably by Enoch Light) and the various versions have been sampled in songs by hip-hop artists, including the Beatnuts, Jennifer Lopez and Jennie.

== Personnel ==
- Herbie Mann - flute
- Tony Levin - bass
- Steve Gadd - drums
- Cissy Houston - backing vocal
- Ralph MacDonald or Ray Barretto - percussion

=== Chart positions (Herbie Mann version) ===
| Chart (1975) | Peak position |
|---|---|
| Australia (Kent Music Report) | 73 |
| U.S. Billboard Hot 100 | 14 |
| U.S. Billboard Hot Soul Singles | 24 |
| U.S. Billboard Disco Action | 1 |

== See also ==
- List of number-one dance singles of 1975 (U.S.)
