= Blackpool Mecca =

Entertainment venue in Lancashire, England

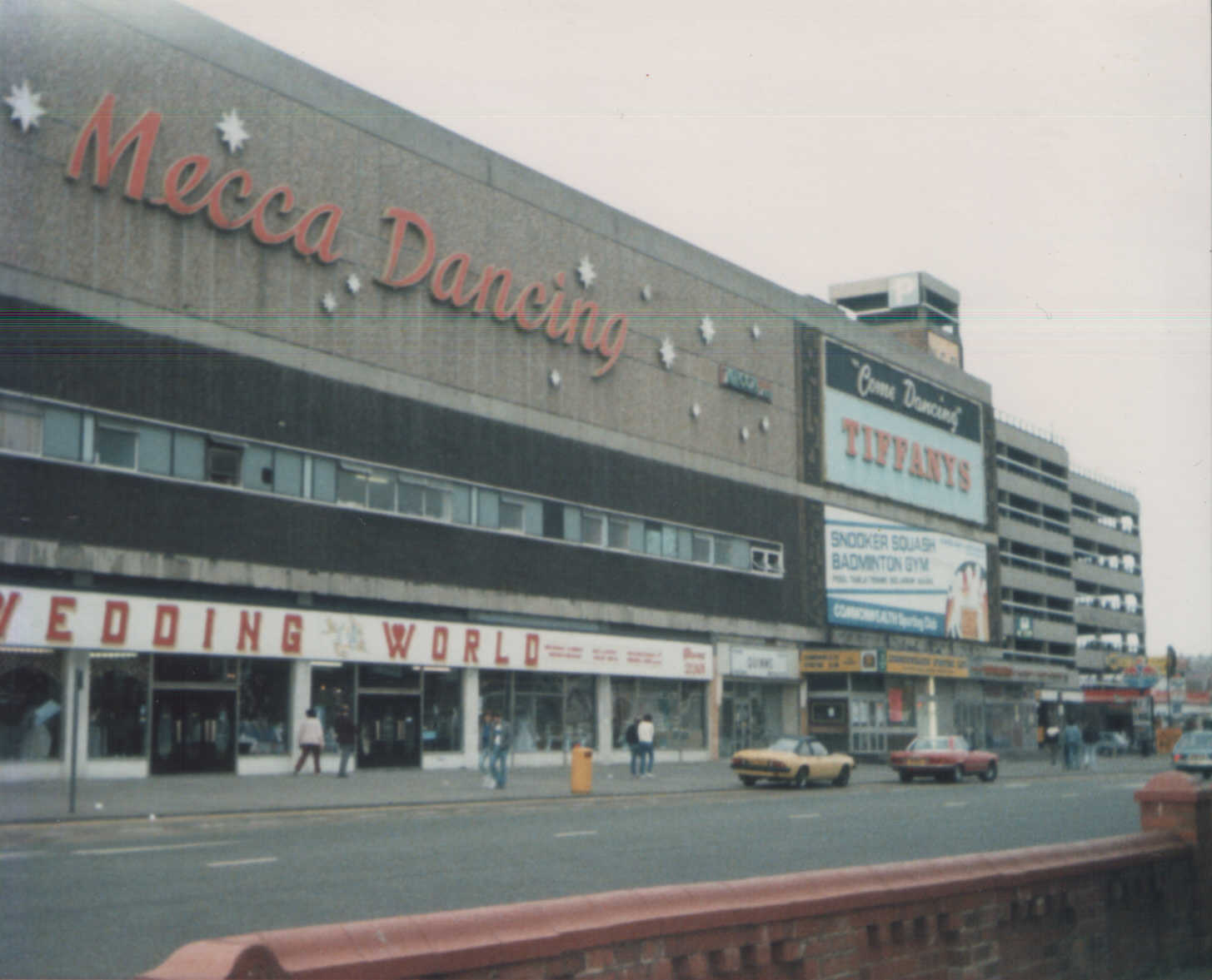
- Exterior of the Mecca Complex, early 1980s

- Location in Blackpool
- Address: Central Drive
- Location: Blackpool
- Coordinates: 53.807°N 3.047°W
- Operator: Mecca Leisure Group
- Type: Entertainment venue
- Event: Northern soul (The Highland Room)

Construction
- Opened: 1965
- Closed: 1980s
- Demolished: January 2009

The Blackpool Mecca was a large entertainment venue on Central Drive in the seaside town of Blackpool, Lancashire, in North West England, first opened in 1965. In the 1970s, it was particularly known for The Highland Room, which was a major Northern Soul music venue. From 1977 onwards it was also host to the Commonwealth Sporting Club. The building was closed down in the 1980s and was finally demolished in January 2009 to make way for new campus buildings of Blackpool and The Fylde College. However, following an issue with funding B&FC withdrew and as of 2013 the site is planned for residential development.

== Northern soul at The Highland Room ==
The Highland Room was used as a soul venue from 1967 to 1979 and it became one of the most popular venues on the Northern soul scene. Unlike similar clubs such as the Wigan Casino and the Golden Torch, these events were not "all-nighters" and ran from 8 pm until 2 am on Saturday evenings.

The two main DJs for the Highland Room soul nights were Ian Levine and Colin Curtis. Several classic 1960s Northern soul records were discovered and "broken" by the aforementioned DJs at the venue, including Tony Clarke's "Landslide", Morris Chesnut's "Too Darn Soulful", Frankie Beverly & the Butlers' "If That's What You Wanted" and R. Dean Taylor's "There's a Ghost in My House".

Later in the 1970s, the Highland Room became synonymous with a more contemporary and less frenetic style of Northern soul music, typified by records such as The Carstairs' "It Really Hurts Me Girl", Voices of East Harlem's "Cashin' In" and the Charisma Band's "Ain't Nothing Like Your Love". Because of the change in tempo, a slightly different shuffling dance style developed at the venue. This newer sound and dance style caused some controversy and led to the formation of the parallel Modern soul subgenre, which still exists today within and alongside the mainstream Northern soul movement.

=== Discography ===
The Northern soul music of the Highland Room has been commemorated by several compilation LPs and CDs, including:

- Mecca Magic: the Soulful Sounds of Blackpool's Mecca 1973–1979 (LP, Kent Records 1990)
- The Blackpool Mecca Story (CD, Goldmine 1999)
- Spirit of the Mecca (CD, Goldmine 2000)
- Reachin’ For The Best: The Northern Soul of the Blackpool Mecca (CD, Sanctuary Records 2004)
- The Northern Soul Story Vol 3: Blackpool Mecca (CD, Sony BMG 2007)
- Highland Room – The Golden Era: 24 Highlights From Blackpool Mecca (CD, Soulworld 2009)
- Blackpool Mecca "Legends" (MP3 compilation, Soul Food 2009)

== Commonwealth Sporting Club ==
In 1977 the Commonwealth Sporting Club was opened at the Mecca. It included a 25-table snooker area and boxing, squash, badminton and gym facilities. Joe Davis performed the opening ceremony, and Steve Davis described it as the "best club in the country of its time". In 1989 the club was closed and replaced by a bowling alley.

== Bibliography ==
- Bill Brewster and Frank Broughton (2000) [1999]. "Northern Soul: After Tonight Is All Over". Last Night a DJ Saved My Life: The History of the Disc Jockey. New York: Grove Press. pp. 75–105. ISBN 0-8021-3688-5.
- Dave Haslam (2002) [2001]. "Leaving the Go-Go- Girls at Home: the Northern Soul DJs". Adventures on the Wheels of Steel: the rise of the superstar DJs. London: 4th Estate. pp. 152–184. ISBN 1-84115-433-4.
- Mike Ritson and Stuart Russell (1999). The in Crowd: The Story of the Northern & Rare Soul Scene, Volume 1. Bee Cool. ISBN 0-9536626-1-6.
- Russ Winstanley and David Nowell (1996). "Competition Ain't Nuthin'". Soul Survivors: The Wigan Casino Story. Robson Books. pp. 61–70. ISBN 1-86105-126-3.
