= Barrabás =

Spanish musical group

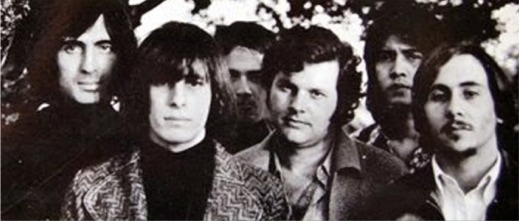
- Barrabás in 1971: (L–R: Arbex, Vidal, M. Morales, Duarte, R. Morales, Egaña)

Background information
- Origin: Madrid, Spain
- Genres: Rock, funk, soul, disco
- Years active: 1971–1977, 1980–1990, 1993–present
- Labels: RCA, CBS, Atco
- Members: Roció Chaves; Juan Escobar; Carlos Bargas; Luis Torres; Francisco Nuñez
- Past members: Fernando Arbex; Tito Duarte; Iñaki Egaña; José María Moll; Ricky Morales; Miguel Morales; Juan Vidal; José Luís Tejada; Daniel Louis; Ernie Garrett; Susy Gordaliza; Koky Maning; Armando Pelayo
- Website: www.barrabasofficial.com

Barrabás are a Spanish musical group, most successful in the 1970s and 1980s when they were led by drummer and producer Fernando Arbex. The group's musical style was initially Latin rock with jazz and funk influences, and later developed into a more disco-orientated sound.

== History ==
Arbex formed Barrabás in 1971 when his previous band, Alacrán, split. He and Alacrán's bass guitarist and vocalist Ignacio "Iñaki" Egaña were joined by several other musicians in preparation for the recording of their debut album Wild Safari released later that year. These were Filipino guitarist brothers Ricky and Miguel Morales; Portuguese keyboard player Juan Vidal and Cuban percussionist, saxophone and flute player Ernesto "Tito" Duarte.

Wild Safari spawned the hit singles "Woman" and "Wild Safari" which were successful in various countries across Europe and the Americas, including the USA and Canada. The group also toured throughout Latin America.

Arbex removed Egaña from the group after the recording of Wild Safari, and also decided to further reduce his own involvement as a musician, hiring two new members, José Luis Tejada and José María Moll, as vocalist and drummer respectively. Moll had played live with Barrabás from the beginning, with Arbex only playing on Wild Safari. This new line-up recorded two albums, Power in 1973 and ¡Soltad a Barrabás! in 1974. The latter album featured the hit single "Hi-Jack", which reached № 1 in Spain, and was successfully covered by American jazz musician Herbie Mann in 1975.

Moll then left the band after disagreements with the other members, and was replaced by Daniel Louis. With the popularity of disco in the mid-1970s, Barrabás moved in that direction and produced a number of minor hits. There was another line-up change when Tejada and Ricky Morales left to be replaced by Ernie Garrett on guitar and vocals. Garrett was soon forced to leave the band with heart problems and Barrabás disbanded in 1977. Arbex then moved fully towards writing and producing music for other artists.

The group reformed in 1980 with a new line-up. Neither the Morales brothers, Vidal nor Louis were involved, and were replaced by the returning Moll, Costa Rican guitarist "Koky" Maning, bassist "Susy" Gordaliza and keyboard player Armando Pelayo. This line-up recorded two albums before being dropped by their record label, RCA, and subsequently Tejada, Maning, Gordaliza and Pelayo all left. Miguel Morales and Iñaki Egaña then returned for the recording of the 1983 album Prohibido for CBS.

Barrabás continued on a smaller scale afterwards under the leadership of Moll, still accompanied by Egaña and Miguel Morales, with Duarte and other musicians helping out both live and in the studio. A number of albums were recorded in the 1990s, consisting of re-recordings of songs from the 1970s and 1980s. The group continues in 2025 with a new lineup, still under the control of Moll.

Barrabás founder Fernando Arbex died in 2003. Multi-instrumentalist Ernesto "Tito" Duarte died in Spain on 14 July 2003, at age 57.

Tejada died on 20 April 2014 at age 69. Ricky Morales died on 28 September 2024 in Madrid, aged 79. Miguel Morales died on 19 September 2025, aged 75.

== Personnel ==
=== Current members ===
- Roció Chaves – vocals, percussion
- Juan Escobar – guitar
- Carlos Bargas – bass guitar
- Luis Torres – keyboards
- Francisco Nuñez – drums

=== Former members ===
- Fernando Arbex (1941–2003) – drums (1971–72), production
- Iñaki Egaña (1948–) – bass guitar, vocals (1971–72, 1983–?)
- Ernesto "Tito" Duarte (1946–2003) – saxophone, flute, drums, percussion (1971–77, 1980–2003)
- Enrique "Ricky" Morales (1945–2024) – lead guitar, vocals (1971–77)
- Miguel Morales (1950–2025) – guitar, bass guitar, vocals (1971–77, 1983–?)
- Ernie Garrett (d. 1978) – guitar, vocals (1977)
- João Antonio "Juan" Vidal (1945–) – keyboards, vocals (1971–77)
- José Luis Tejada (1945–2014) – vocals (1972–77, 1980–83)
- José María Moll (1946–) – drums (1972–74, 1980–?)
- Daniel Louis (1946–d.) – drums (1974–77)
- Armando Pelayo (1948–) – keyboards (1980–83)
- Jorge Eduardo "Koky" Maning – guitar, vocals (1980–83)
- Jesús "Susi" Gordaliza – bass guitar, vocals (1980–83)

== Album discography ==
- Wild Safari – 1971 (AKA Barrabás)
- Power – 1973
- ¡Soltad a Barrabás! – 1974 (AKA Release Barrabás or Hi-Jack)
- Heart of the City – 1975 (AKA Check Mate)
- Watch Out – 1975 (AKA Desperately)
- Barrabás – 1977 (AKA Swinger or Watch-Out)
- Piel de Barrabás – 1981
- Bestial – 1982
- Prohibido – 1983
- Barrabás Power – Abraxa – 1994
- Grandes Éxitos – 1997
- Vive – 1999
