= Crown Heights Affair =

American R&B, funk and disco group

- Origin: Crown Heights, Brooklyn, New York City, United States
- Genres: R&B, disco, funk
- Years active: 1967–1984; 2013
- Labels: De-Lite, RCA (United States)
- Past members: Ben Iverson; Arnold "Muki" Wilson; Bert Reid (deceased); Darryl Gibbs; James "Ajax" Baynard (deceased); Phillip "Flip" Thomas; Raymond Rock; William Anderson; Raymond Reid (deceased); Howard Young

Crown Heights Affair is an American R&B / funk / disco group from Brooklyn, New York City, founded in 1967.

== Career ==
Originally known as Ben Iverson and the Nue Dey Express on Britne Records, founded by then-bassist Donnie Linton, the group was renamed for a neighborhood in Brooklyn. The line-up consisted of Phillip Thomas (vocals), William Anderson (guitar/vocals), Howard Young (keyboards), Bert Reid and James "Ajax" Baynard (trumpets), Raymond Reid (trombone), Arnold 'Muki' Wilson (bass), Julius Dilligard Jr. (trombone), and Raymond Rock (drums, percussion). Under contract to RCA they recorded their self-titled first album in 1974, featuring their first single "(You Can't Bend My) Super Rod".

Personnel changes followed, along with a shift in 1975 to De-Lite Records. The record label's subsequent liaison with Polygram Records saw the group gain worldwide audiences for singles such as "Dreaming a Dream", "Every Beat of My Heart", "Foxy Lady" and "Dancin'".

"Dreaming a Dream" reached Number one on the US Hot Dance Club Play chart in 1975, (plus US Billboard Hot 100 #43); and they topped out at #2 on the US Dance Chart later that year with "Every Beat of My Heart" (Billboard Hot 100 #83). In the UK Singles Chart they made the top 40 in 1978 with "Galaxy of Love", and #10 in 1980 with "You Gave Me Love". Both tracks were huge disco hits in the UK, with a powerful brass section on "Galaxy of Love" and strong chorus vocals on "You Gave Me Love".

Their follow-up album, Do It Your Way, contained the tunes "Dancin'", "Far Out" and their answer to New Birth's song "Gotta Get a Knutt', "(Do It) The French Way". In the 1980s they were successful record producers for some Prelude Records acts like France Joli ("Gonna Get Over You"), and they produced two songs for Amii Stewart in 1981. Crown Heights Affair disbanded in 1984.

On 22 June 2013, they reunited to play at the Coronet in London, as part of the Streetsounds Summer Ball.

Bert Reid died of lung cancer on December 12, 2004, at the age of 48. Thomas joined the Flamingos in 2007.

Raymond Reid (born on November 30, 1952, in New York) died of cancer on May 21, 2013. He was 60.

Trumpeter James "Ajax" Baynard died on February 20, 2015, after a car crash in South Jamaica, New York. He was 63. The news of his death was posted on the Crown Heights Affair Facebook page.

== Discography ==
=== Studio albums ===
Year	Title	Peak chart positions		
Year	Title	US	US R&B	UK
1974	Crown Heights Affair	—	—	—
1975	Dreaming a Dream	121	28	—
1976	Foxy Lady	—	59	—
1977	Do It Your Way	—	41	—
1978	Dream World	—	56	40
1979	Dance Lady Dance	—	40	—
1980	Sure Shot	148	50	—
1982	Think Positive!	—	—	—
1983	Struck Gold	—	—	—
"—" denotes releases that did not chart.

=== Singles ===
Year	Title	Peak chart positions			
Year	Title	US	US R&B	US Dance	UK
1974	"Leave the Kids Alone"	—	96	—	—
1975	"Dreaming a Dream"	43	5	1	—
1975	"Every Beat of My Heart"	83	20	2	—
1976	"Foxy Lady"	49	17	—	—
1977	"Dancin'"	42	16	6	58 (Note: Chart position is from the official UK "Breakers List".)
1977	"Do It the French Way"	—	60	—	—
1978	"Galaxy of Love"	—	—	—	24
1978	"Say a Prayer for Two"	—	41	—	—
1978	"I'm Gonna Love You Forever"	—	—	—	47
1979	"Dance Lady Dance"	—	20	—	44
1980	"You Gave Me Love"	102	74	12	10
1980	"Sure Shot"	—	72	—	—
1980	"You've Been Gone"	—	—	—	44
1982	"Somebody Tell Me What to Do"	—	31	—	—
1983	"Rock the World"	—	—	—	76
1989	"I'll Do Anything"	—	—	43	83
"—" denotes releases that did not chart or were not released.

== See also ==
- List of number-one dance hits (United States)
- List of artists who reached number one on the US Dance chart
