= Iñaki Egaña =

- Born: Ignacio Egaña Azpeitia; 24 October 1948 (age 77); Portugalete, Vasconia, Francoist Spain
- Instruments: Bass guitar, Vocals
- Formerly of: Barrabás
- Website: Iñaki Egaña on Facebook

Ignacio "Iñaki" Egaña Azpeitia (born 24 October 1948 in Portugalete, Basque Country) is a Spanish musician and songwriter, active since the late 1960s in various rock and blues groups and as a solo artist. He is primarily a bass guitar player and vocalist.

== Career ==
After starting his career with Los Tañidores, releasing a single "Cerrado por balance" in 1967, Egaña passed through a number of bands including Combination Five and Los Snobs. He joined the blues rock group Los Buenos in 1968, who enjoyed a period of commercial success in their native Spain, releasing four singles. Other members included organist Rod Mayall, brother of British blues icon John Mayall.

In 1970, Egaña joined two ex-members of Los Brincos, drummer Fernando Arbex and Colombian guitarist Oscar Lasprilla to form Alacrán, a Latin rock trio following a musical path similar to that of American band Santana. They released one self-titled album, which again was successful in Spain. When Lasprilla moved to England, Egaña and Arbex formed Barrabás, recruiting several other experienced musicians, and went on to have hit singles across Europe and also in the United States.

Arbex removed Egaña from the group after the recording of the Wild Safari album, and Egaña subsequently played bass guitar for Miguel Ríos. He then embarked upon a solo career, working with drummer Kiko Guerrero, releasing a hard rock album Karma (and two singles) in 1974. He also wrote songs for the first album by Spanish singer Juan Camacho. In 1976, Egaña and Guerrero teamed up with guitarist Manuel Rodríguez to form Imán, releasing several albums during the late 1970s.

In 1983, Egaña returned to Barrabás for the recording of the Prohibido album. In 1999, he began his involvement with Dr Blues Band, and continued performing with the current incarnation of Barrabás, as well as with Basque musician Goio Gutiérrez. He spent several years working with singer Juan Pardo, recording three albums, and later recorded an album with Los Mitos. He has also worked with a new group called Caeman including musicians such as Diego Fopiani, Paco Delgado and Blas Lago.

== Solo discography ==
=== "Karma" ===
1. "Tale for Tom" (Johanna McManus, Ignacio Egaña) – 2:21
2. "El Maestro" (Egaña) – 3:32
3. "You Rock Your Way" (McManus, Egaña) – 2:26
4. "Tú Mismo" (Egaña) – 4:04
5. "Hostal San Quintín" (Egaña) – 3:10
6. "Lack of Relations" (McManus, Egaña) – 3:27
7. "How Many Times?" (McManus, Egaña) – 4:16
8. "En un Lugar" (Egaña, Francisco Guerrero) – 2:13

RCA SPL-12097, 1974

=== Singles ===
- "Tale for Tom" / Hostal San Quintín" (RCA, 1974)
- "Lack of Relations" / "El Maestro" (RCA, 1974)
