= Free Man (song) =

Single by South Shore Commission

from the album South Shore Commission
- B-side: "Free Man" (Disco Mix)
- Released: May 24, 1975
- Recorded: 1975
- Genre: Disco
- Length: 3:10 (7" version); 5:35 (Disco Mix version); 7:21 (Album version)
- Label: Wand
- Songwriters: Bunny Sigler, Ronnie Tyson
- Producer: Bunny Sigler

South Shore Commission singles chronology
"Free Man" (1975)	"We're on the Right Track" (1976)

"Free Man" is a 1975 song by South Shore Commission. The song went to number one for one week on the Billboard disco/dance chart. The single also peaked at #61 on the Billboard Hot 100 and #9 on the R&B chart.

"Free Man" was written by Bunny Sigler and Ronnie Tyson and produced by Sigler.
