= Big Al Downing =

American musician (1940–2005)

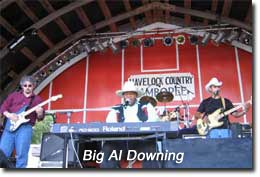
- Big Al performing in concert in 2004

Background information
- Born: Alexander Downing; January 9, 1940; Lenapah, Oklahoma, U.S.
- Died: July 4, 2005 (aged 65) Massachusetts, U.S.
- Genres: Rockabilly, rock and roll, blues, rhythm and blues, country, gospel
- Occupation: Musician
- Years active: 1958–2005

Alexander Downing (January 9, 1940 – July 4, 2005), better known as Big Al Downing, was an American musician and entertainer. He received the Billboard's New Artist of the Year and the Single of the Year Award in 1979. He was inducted into the Rockabilly Hall of Fame and was a frequent performer at the Grand Ole Opry. Downing was also nominated for the Best New Artist Award of the Academy of Country Music and appeared on Hee Haw, Nashville Now, and Dick Clark's American Bandstand television programs.

== Biography ==
=== Early career ===
Downing was born in Lenapah, Oklahoma, United States. Downing began his career doing piano and vocals in Bobby Poe and The Poe Kats, who were an early backing band for country entertainer Wanda Jackson. His piano contributed to the single "Let's Have A Party", which was released in 1960. The song reached No. 32 on the UK Singles Chart and made the Top 40 on the U.S. Billboard Hot 100.

Downing reached the U.S. Hot 100 with "You’ll Never Miss the Water (Till the Well Runs Dry)", a duet with Little Esther Phillips. After the release of this single, he was signed by Warner Brothers. In 1974, Downing recorded the single, "I'll Be Holding On", which went to number one on the U.S. Disco chart for three weeks. In addition, "I'll Be Holding On" was a hit in Europe. On the other US charts, the single went to No. 31 on the soul chart and No. 85 on the Billboard Hot 100.

=== Country music with Warner Brothers ===
Al Downing's popularity continued to grow, and he had several hits on the country charts between 1978 and 1989. He compiled a list of his own songs, which he presented to his producer at Warner Brothers. In 1978, "Mr. Jones" reached the Top 20, followed by "Touch Me (I'll Be Your Fool Once More)" in 1979. That same year, Downing produced "Midnight Lace", which reached the 50s on the charts, and "I Ain't No Fool", which peaked at the upper 70s. In 1980, the "Story Behind The Story" reached the Top 40 and "Bring It On Home" reached the Top 20. That same year he was nominated for Best New Male Vocalist from the Academy of Country Music.

Two years passed before Downing created another hit, this time with the Team label. In 1982, "I'll Be Loving You" reached the Top 50, followed by "Darlene", which reached the lower 60s. The next year, "It Takes Love" reached the Top 40, followed by "Let's Sing About Love", which peaked in the mid-60s. In 1984, "The Best Of Families" became a Top 50 hit; That same year, Downing released his final hit with the Team label, "There’ll Never Be A Better Night For Being Wrong".

=== Vine Street years ===
In 1987, Downing was signed by the Vine Street label, which released the "Oh How Beautiful You Are" (To Me) and "Just One Night Won't Do", both of which hit the Top 70. Two years later, he was signed by Door Knob Records, with whom he produced the 1989 Top 100 hit, "I Guess By Now".

The popular entertainer Fats Domino recorded two songs written by Downing: "Mary, Oh Mary" and "Heartbreak Hill". Bobby "Blue" Bland and Tom Jones have also recorded Downing's songs.

=== Later career ===
Downing built a five-decade career around his powerful singing voice and his hard-driving rockabilly-style piano. Downing's compilations of earlier work have been released throughout the world. In Europe, Crazy Music obtained exclusive rights for the original Team label recordings and released these in the form of a 2-CD compilation, Classic Collection. This also contained some of Downing's earlier hits, including "Mr. Jones".

In July 2002, he played the Oneida Casino's Rock'n'Roll Festival in Green Bay, Wisconsin with dozens of other rockabilly musicians.

In 2003, Downing released his first new album in more than a decade, One of A Kind. The album received favourable radio and print reviews. It ranked third on American Roots Country and was commended for featuring 14 memorable tracks. He continued to give regular performances at the Grand Ole Opry. In 2000, he was nominated as a member of the Rockabilly Hall of Fame and the Oklahoma Music Hall of Fame.

Downing continued to perform on more than 75 occasions per year in the remaining years of his life. He appeared at Ontario's Havelock Country Jamboree with Kenny Rogers and Roy Clark. In 2005, Downing postponed plans for a European tour that was set to begin on July 1 in Austria. He was hospitalized and diagnosed with acute lymphoblastic leukemia. Soon after, he commenced chemotherapy treatment. Downing died on July 4, 2005.

== Style ==
Downing's musical style found its roots in a variety of musical styles including rock and roll, blues, roots, gospel and country. He performed rhythm and blues and disco throughout the 1960s and 1970s, when he lived in Washington, D.C. He eventually reclaimed his musical roots by turning to country music.

== Producer ==
In additional to his work as a recording artist and performer, Downing also worked as a music producer. During late 1990s and early 2000s, he worked with several European musicians as an artists and repertoire (A&R) agent. In 2003, he produced the album, Straight Beat, with the Italian bluesman Edo 'Ndoss, which included songs written by Downing that he had not recorded himself. Downing's piano work on this album represented his last recording.

== Discography ==
=== Albums ===
Year	Album	US Country	Label
1971	Big Al Downing and His Friends		Collector
1982	Big Al Downing	22	Team
1987	Big Al Downing & the Poe Kats		Jumble
1988	Rockin' 'n' Rollin		Rollercoaster
1994	Back to My Roots		Orchard
1994	Rockin' Down the Farm		Eagle
1996	Rockin' & Rollin'		Schoolkids
1997	Classic Collection		Crazy Music Austria
1998	Rockin' Down the Farm Vol. 2		Eagle
2003	US Greatest Hits, Vol. 1		Orchard
2003	One of a Kind		Hayden's Ferry
2007	Live at XM Radio		Crazy Music Austria
2008	Best of the Early Years		Crazy Music Austria

=== Singles ===
Year	Single	Chart positions			Album
Year	Single	US	US Country	CAN Country	Album
1958	"Down On the Farm"	—	—	—	singles only
1958	"Miss Lucy"	–	—	—	singles only
1958	"Just Around the Corner"	–	—	—	singles only
1962	"The Story of My Life"	117	—	—	singles only
1963	"You Never Miss Your Water"	73	—	—	singles only
1963	"If You Want It"	129	—	—	singles only
1975	"I'll Be Holding On"	85	—	—	
1976	"I Love to Love"	107	—	—	
1978	"Mr. Jones"	—	20	65	Big Al Downing
1979	"Touch Me (I'll Be Your Fool Once More)"	—	18	59	Big Al Downing
1979	"Midnight Lace"	—	59	—	singles only
1979	"I Ain't No Fool"	—	73	—	singles only
1980	"The Story Behind the Story"	—	33	—	singles only
1980	"Bring It On Home"	—	20	—	Big Al Downing
1982	"I'll Be Loving You"	—	48	—	Big Al Downing
1982	"Darlene"	—	67	—	Big Al Downing
1983	"It Takes Love"	—	38	—	Big Al Downing
1983	"Let's Sing About Love"	—	64	—	singles only
1984	"The Best of Families"	—	45	—	singles only
1984	"There'll Never Be a Better Night for Bein' Wrong"	—	76	—	singles only
1987	"How Beautiful You Are (To Me)"	—	69	—	singles only
1987	"Just One Night Won't Do"	—	67	—	singles only
1989	"I Guess By Now"	—	82	—	singles only

== See also ==
- List of number-one dance singles of 1974 (U.S.)
- List of number-one dance singles of 1975 (U.S.)
