= South Shore Commission =

South Shore Commission were an American Soul/funk band from Washington D.C. that released a stand-alone single called "Right On Brother" on the Atlantic Records label in 1970. A self-titled album followed in 1975 on Wand records. Members included Warren Harding Hagood II (drums), Sidney Lanier Pinchback II (guitar), David Thomas Henderson (bass guitar), David Abner Scott (vocals), Armed Allen McIntosh (trumpet and saxophone), Joe Hudson (saxophone), Melvin Moore (trumpet), Kenny Anderson (trumpet), Sheryl Henry (vocals), Frank McCurry (vocals), Eugene T. Rogers (percussion and guitar), and Lantz Arnell (keyboards).

The band had three Billboard Hot 100 chart hits, the most popular of which, "Free Man," their first release, hit #61 in 1975, reached number 9 on the R&B chart. "Free Man" also hit #1 on the disco chart for one week. This was followed in 1976 by "We're On The Right Track" (#94) and "Train Called Freedom (#86).

== See also ==
- List of number-one dance hits (United States)
- List of artists who reached number one on the US Dance chart
