= I'll Be Holding On =

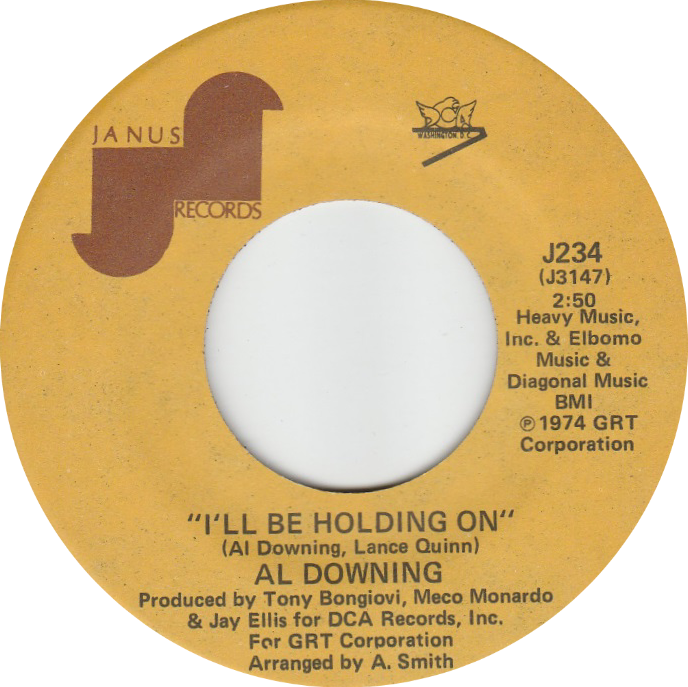
- "I'll Be Holding On" by Al Downing; A-side label of the US single release

Single by Al Downing
- B-side: "Baby Let's Talk It Over"
- Released: October 1974
- Genre: Disco
- Length: 3:07 (7" version); 5:35 (Disco Mix version)
- Label: Chess
- Songwriter(s): Al Downing, Lance Quinn, Andrew Smith
- Producer(s): Tony Bongiovi, Meco Monardo, Jay Ellis

"I'll Be Holding On" is a 1974 song by Al Downing. "I'll Be Holding On" was written by Downing, Lance Quinn, and Andrew Smith and produced by Tony Bongiovi, Meco Monardo, and Jay Ellis.

"I'll Be Holding On", went to number one for three weeks on the Billboard disco/dance chart. The single also peaked at #85 on the Billboard Hot 100 and #31 on the R&B chart.
