= Gene Redd Jr. =

- Born: Clarence Eugene Redd III; United States
- Occupations: Record producer, music industry executive

Gene Redd Jr., not to be confused with his father Gene Redd was a music producer and record label founder who was active in the 1960s and 1970s.

== Background ==
Gene Redd was born to parents Gene and Katherine Redd. His sister was singer Sharon Redd.

Redd played a part in the musical direction of Kool & The Gang. he instructed them to change their music to a more commercial format due to change of chords and in the way they should play. Redd went to Gabe Vigorito the president of De-Lite Records and put a pile on his desk and said, "'Which record do you want?" Vigorito signed them all and the first single, titled "Kool and the Gang" ended up being a hit, and in just New York alone, it sold in excess of 250,000 copies.

Marvin Schlachter, the president of Chess Records referred to Redd as one of the most consistent hit-makers in the record business.

== Early years ==
Around the mid 1950s, Redd joined The Fi-Tones as a first tenor and pianist. He also sang on about ten of the group's recordings.

== Career ==
It was reported in the 5 November 1966 issue of Billboard that Redd who had been a production assistant with Musicor Records was to take on some of the creative duties that were previously done by Art Talmadge, the president of the label.

=== Red Coach Productions, Red Coach Records ===
In the early 1970s, Redd was president of Red Coach Records. As reported in the 1 July 1972 issue of Record World, Redd and Chess Records President Marvin Schlachter had jointly announced an arrangement between the two entities. Chess / Janus was to exclusively distribute Red Coach Productions product on a long-term basis.

Two acts that Redd managed were The Everyday People and Lu, Paul & Brian.

He arranged and produced the Lu, Paul and Brian (School Boys) single, "I Can't Wait Until Tomorrow" bw "Mama Said - Papa Said (Too Young to Marry)" for Red Coach Productions. The songs were released on Janus J-193 in September 1972.

Redd was the executive producer of the song "It Really Hurts Me Girl" that was released on Red Coach RC 802 in 1973. The song would go on to be a hit on the northern soul scene. According to Far Out magazine, the song is a "controversial classic which marked a turning point within northern soul". It is also rated No. 83 on The 100 greatest northern soul songs of all-time list.

The Everyday People had changed their name to The Hot Line, and had released the single, "I Like What I Like" bw "Get Down Get Stank!" on Red Coach RC 804 in October 1973. It did get some airplay in November on radio station WHAT in Philadelphia.

It was reported in the 17 May 1974 issue of Radio & Records that Philadelphia group Universal Mind was releasing an album on the red Coach label. It was produced by Redd and Jimmy Bishop who was known for his time on radio station WDAS. The single from the album was "Something Fishy Going On".

=== Further activities ===
Redd produced the 1985 Loc it Up album for the group BMP.
