= Fernando Arbex =

- Arbex in 1971

Background information
- Born: José Fernando Arbex Miró; 28 May 1941; Madrid
- Died: 5 July 2003 (aged 62) Madrid
- Instrument: Drums
- Formerly of: Los Brincos; Barrabás

José Fernando Arbex Miró (28 May 1941 – 5 July 2003) was an influential Spanish musician and songwriter from Madrid, who enjoyed success both with his own groups and also with other artists.

While still in his teens, he was the drummer in Los Estudiantes, and in 1965 he formed the very successful pop band Los Brincos (often seen as the "Spanish Beatles") in which he also played drums. After that group split in the late 1960s, Arbex formed the progressive Latin rock trio Alacrán with Iñaki Egaña and Oscar Lasprilla, releasing an album Alacran in 1969 which has drawn comparisons with Santana. When Lasprilla left the band and moved to England, Arbex and Egaña founded the Latin disco and rock-orientated Barrabás, who went on to considerable European success throughout the 1970s. Their most successful hit single "Woman" was a club hit in the US.

Alongside his career as a musician, Arbex acted as a producer and songwriter for many successful acts, including Jose Feliciano, Harry Belafonte, Nana Mouskouri, Emilio Aragón, Miguel Bosé and Middle of the Road. He also recorded works outside the world of popular music. He composed the original music for the first Spanish Musical "La Maja de Goya", and music for cinema and ballet.

In 2000, he reformed Los Brincos for an extremely successful special concert in A Coruña, and also recorded with a reformed version of Barrabás.

Fernando Arbex died in 2003 after a long illness.
