= The Grace Jones Story =

Compilation album by Grace Jones
- Released: April 4, 2006
- Recorded: 1977–1993
- Genres: Post-punk-pop; disco; reggae; R&B
- Length: 146:59
- Label: Universal

Grace Jones chronology
The Universal Masters Collection (2003)	The Grace Jones Story (2006)	The Ultimate Collection (2006)

Professional ratings
Review scores
Source	Rating
AllMusic	4/5 stars
PopMatters	7/10 stars

The Grace Jones Story is a 2006 anthology of songs recorded and released by Jamaican singer and songwriter Grace Jones, spanning from 1977 to 1993. It was released on 4th April 2006 as a joint venture from Island Records and Universal Music.

== Background ==
The Grace Jones Story was Island Records/Universal Music's first attempt to create a comprehensive documentation of Jones' recording career; starting in 1977 with her debut album Portfolio, and ending with the one-off Island Records single "Sex Drive" in 1993.

Disc one gathers tracks from her first four albums: Portfolio, Fame, Muse and Warm Leatherette. Disc two includes one more track representing Warm Leatherette and songs from Jones's next four albums: Nightclubbing, Living My Life, Inside Story and Bulletproof Heart, plus the B-side "She's Lost Control" and "Sex Drive". The compilation however omits her biggest commercial hit, the 1985 "Slave to the Rhythm", and other charting songs, such as "Party Girl" and "Amado Mio", as well as one of Jones' signature tracks, "Demolition Man".

== Track listing ==
Disc One

1. "That's the Trouble" (Grace Jones, Pierre Papadiamandis) – 3:39
2. "I Need a Man" (Pierre Papadiamandis, Paul Adrian Slade) – 3:24
3. "La Vie en rose" (Édith Piaf, Louis Guglielmi, Mack David) – 7:28
4. "Send in the Clowns" (Stephen Sondheim) – 7:35
5. "What I Did for Love" (Marvin Hamlisch, Edward Kleban) – 5:17
6. "Do or Die" (Jack Robinson, James Bolden) – 3:22
7. "Fame" (Jack Robinson, Gil Slavin) – 5:36
8. "Am I Ever Gonna Fall in Love in New York City" (Jack Robinson, Vivienne Savoie Robinson, James Bolden) – 5:28
9. "Don't Mess with the Messer" (Grace Jones, Pierre Papadiamandis) – 4:52
10. "Sinning" (Grace Jones, Pierre Papadiamandis) – 5:06
11. "Saved" (Jack Robinson, James Bolden, Vivienne Savoie Robinson) – 5:01
12. "Warm Leatherette" (Daniel Miller) – 4:29
13. "Love Is the Drug" (Bryan Ferry, Andy Mackay) – 7:11
14. "The Hunter Gets Captured by the Game" (Smokey Robinson) – 3:48

Disc Two

1. "Private Life" (Chrissie Hynde) – 5:13
2. "She's Lost Control" (Bernard Dickin, Peter Hook, Stephen Morris, Ian Curtis) – 8:23
3. "Pull Up to the Bumper" (Kookoo Baya, Grace Jones, Dana Mano) – 3:41
4. "Walking in the Rain" (Harry Vanda, George Young) – 4:20
5. "Use Me" (Bill Withers) – 5:05
6. "Nightclubbing" (David Bowie, Iggy Pop) – 5:06
7. "I've Seen That Face Before (Libertango)" (Ástor Piazzolla, Barry Reynolds, Dennis Wilkey, Nathalie Delon) – 4:30
8. "My Jamaican Guy" (Grace Jones) – 6:01
9. "The Apple Stretching" (Melvin Van Peebles) – 7:10
10. "Nipple to the Bottle" (Grace Jones, Sly Dunbar) – 5:53
11. "I'm Not Perfect" (Grace Jones, Bruce Woolley) – 3:59
12. "Love on Top of Love" (David Cole, Grace Jones) – 6:16
13. "Someone to Love" (Grace Jones, Chris Stanley) – 4:49
14. "Sex Drive" (Sheep on Drugs) – 4:00

Notes: This CD inexplicably skips the first two minutes of "Saved", subsequently starting with the first line of the second verse. Original length of the track is 7:13.
