= Private Life: The Compass Point Sessions =

Compilation album by Grace Jones
- Released: 16 June 1998
- Recorded: 1980–1982; 1985; 1987
- Genres: Dub; new wave; dance; R&B
- Length: 152:37
- Label: Island
- Producers: Alex Sadkin; Chris Blackwell; Trevor Horn; Stephen Lipson

Grace Jones chronology
The Ultimate (1993)	Private Life: The Compass Point Sessions (1998)	The Universal Masters Collection (2003)

Private Life: The Compass Point Sessions is a compilation album consisting of recordings by recorded by Jamaican singer and songwriter Grace Jones released in 1998 by Island Records. The two-disc anthology consists mostly of material pulled from 1980–1982 recording sessions.

== Background, production and release ==
Grace Jones recorded three albums with Sly and Robbie, Wally Badarou, Barry Reynolds, Mikey Chung and Uziah "Sticky" Thompson, a.k.a. the Compass Point Allstars, a studio band named after the legendary Compass Point Studios, Nassau, Bahamas during the period of 1980–1982; Warm Leatherette, Nightclubbing and Living My Life. Private Life: The Compass Point Sessions includes a selection of tracks from the recording sessions for those albums. It collects what is generally regarded to be Jones' best work and also offers a well-researched essay included in the album sleeve. The album includes two previously unreleased songs from the Living My Life sessions: "Man Around the House" and a demo recording of Johnny Cash's 1963 classic "Ring of Fire". Other rarities are "Living My Life", a single-only song, not available on any previous album, and Joy Division's "She's Lost Control", released only as the B-side for "Private Life".

Private Life: The Compass Point Sessions contains long and extended version of Jones' hits, and although the CD booklet claims that these have not been issued before, most of them have in fact appeared on numerous CD re-issues around the world. Other tracks were remixed or re-edited by the PolyGram/Universal engineers in 1998 for this particular compilation, instead of using the many existing long or extended versions by original producers Chris Blackwell and Alex Sadkin that were released on vinyl in 1980–1982. The track "Living My Life" appears as an edited remix by Paul "Groucho" Smykle—dating from 1986, which the liner notes fail to mention. Another anomaly on the album is that it concludes with "Slave to the Rhythm", a track which was recorded in 1985, in London and with British producer Trevor Horn. Also the mix used, here renamed "Hot Blooded Version", is again an alternate 1998 re-mix/re-edit of the original 12" version entitled "Blooded".

For the Brazilian edition of the album, the "Best of" title was added to the original artwork.

== Critical reception ==
Professional ratings
Review scores
Source	Rating
AllMusic	4/5 stars
Tom Hull – on the Web	B+

The album receive favorable reviews from music critics. Stephen Thomas Erlewine from AllMusic website, gave the album four out of five stars and wrote that the album "unquestionably [has] Jones' best material" mainly because "she was supported by a top-notch studio band and produced by Sly Dunbar and Robbie Shakespeare". He opined that the album was of interest primarily to die-hard fans because casual hard fans will think that it has "too much Grace Jones in one place". Music critic Tom Hull gave the album a B+ (or three stars out of five) and wrote that the song "Bullshit" was the "major lost" in the album. Sasha Frere-Jones from SPIN magazine gave the album a favorable review and wrote that its songs "capture the vibe of early 1980's demilitarized zone between disco and hip hop".

== Track listing ==
Information taken from Apple Music, AllMusic and Spotify.

All songs produced by Alex Sadkin and Chris Blackwell, except for "Slave to the Rhythm", produced by Trevor Horn and Stephen Lipson.

Disc one
No.	Title	Writer(s)	Album	Length
1.	"Private Life" (long version)	Chrissie Hynde	Warm Leatherette	6:17
2.	"Private Life" (dub version)	Hynde	Warm Leatherette	8:03
3.	"Love Is the Drug" (long version)	Bryan Ferry; Andy Mackay	Warm Leatherette	8:38
4.	"Breakdown"	Tom Petty	Warm Leatherette	5:29
5.	"Warm Leatherette" (long version)	Daniel Miller	Warm Leatherette	5:35
6.	"The Hunter Gets Captured by the Game" (long version)	Smokey Robinson	Warm Leatherette	6:43
7.	"I've Done It Again"	Barry Reynolds	Nightclubbing	3:49
8.	"Pars" (long version)	Jacques Higelin	Warm Leatherette	5:41
9.	"Pull Up to the Bumper"	Koo Koo Baya; Ronald Dunbar; Grace Jones; Robbie Shakespeare	Nightclubbing	4:33
10.	"Use Me" (long version)	Bill Withers	Nightclubbing	6:10
11.	"She's Lost Control" (long version)	Ian Curtis; Peter Hook; Stephen Morris; Bernard Sumner	Warm Leatherette	8:23
12.	"She's Lost Control" (dub version)	Curtis; Hook; Morris; Sumner	Warm Leatherette	8:37
Total length:				77:58

Disc two
No.	Title	Writer(s)	Album	Length
1.	"Walking in the Rain"	Harry Vanda; George Young	Nightclubbing	4:28
2.	"Cry Now, Laugh Later"	Jones; Reynolds	Living My Life	5:01
3.	"Nightclubbing"	Iggy Pop; David Bowie	Nightclubbing	5:03
4.	"The Apple Stretching"	Melvin Van Peebles	Living My Life	7:06
5.	"Nipple to the Bottle" (long version)	R. Dunbar; Sly Dunbar; Jones	Living My Life	6:54
6.	"My Jamaican Guy" (long version)	Jones	Living My Life	7:02
7.	"Feel Up"	Jones	Nightclubbing	4:01
8.	"I've Seen That Face Before (Libertango)"	Astor Piazzolla; Reynolds	Nightclubbing	4:29
9.	"Demolition Man" (long version)	Sting	Nightclubbing	4:56
10.	"Unlimited Capacity for Love"	Jones; Reynolds	Living My Life	5:43
11.	"Ring of Fire"	June Carter Cash; Merle Kilgore		3:56
12.	"Man Around the House"	Jones; Reynolds		4:12
13.	"Living My Life" (7" version)	Jones		3:30
14.	"Slave to the Rhythm" (Hot Blooded version)	Simon Darlow; Trevor Horn; Stephen Lipson; Bruce Woolley	Slave to the Rhythm	8:18
Total length:				74:39

== Charts ==
Chart performance for Private Life: The Compass Point Sessions
Chart (1998)	Peak position
New Zealand Albums (RMNZ)	37
UK Albums (Official Charts)	158
