= The Universal Masters Collection (Grace Jones album) =

Compilation album by Grace Jones
- Released: December 2, 2003
- Recorded: 1977–1982
- Genres: Reggae; soul; new wave
- Label: Universal

Grace Jones chronology
Private Life: The Compass Point Sessions (1998)	The Universal Masters Collection (2003)	The Grace Jones Story (2006)

Alternative cover
- 2006 Colour Collection re-release

Professional ratings
Review scores
Source	Rating
AllMusic	3.5/5 stars

The Universal Masters Collection is a mid-price compilation of recordings by Grace Jones, first released by Universal Music in 2003.

== Background ==
With the exception of "La Vie en rose" from the 1977 album Portfolio, the 13-track package focuses on material from Jones' Compass Point trilogy: Warm Leatherette (1980), Nightclubbing (1981), and Living My Life (1982). Included in the booklet is an essay by Daryl Easlea, which incorrectly states Jones' birth year.

The album was later re-released a number of times by Universal with the same track listing, but alternate covers and new titles. 2005 saw the release of Best 1200 on the Japanese market. Colour Collection, released in 2006, used the Living My Life picture on its cover, while the German pressing Star-Club präsentiert Grace Jones (2008) recycled the Nightclubbing cover art. In 2008 the album was re-issued as Classic Grace Jones.

== Track listing ==
1. "Private Life" - 5:10
2. "Inspiration" - 4:34
3. "Warm Leatherette" - 4:25
4. "Pull Up to the Bumper" - 4:30
5. "Love Is the Drug" - 7:15
6. "Nightclubbing" - 5:05
7. "Nipple to the Bottle" - 5:55
8. "Breakdown" - 5:30
9. "Demolition Man" - 4:00
10. "La Vie en rose" - 7:27
11. "My Jamaican Guy" - 6:00
12. "Walking in the Rain" - 4:18
13. "I've Seen That Face Before (Libertango)" - 4:28

== Release history ==
Region	Year	Name	Format(s)	Label
Worldwide	2003	The Universal Masters Collection	CD	Universal
Japan	2005	Best 1200	CD	Universal
Worldwide	2006	Colour Collection	CD	Universal
Germany	2008	Star-Club präsentiert Grace Jones	CD	Universal
Worldwide	2008	Classic Grace Jones	CD, Download	Universal, Spectrum
