= The Ultimate Collection (Grace Jones album) =

Compilation album by Grace Jones
- Released: October 20, 2006
- Recorded: 1977–1993
- Genres: Disco; reggae; new wave; house; soul; R&B
- Length: 216:20
- Label: Universal

Grace Jones chronology
The Grace Jones Story (2006)	The Ultimate Collection (2006)	Hurricane (2008)

Professional ratings
Review scores
Source	Rating
AllMusic	4/5 stars

The Ultimate Collection is a 3-CD anthology of recordings recorded by Jamaican singer and songwriter Grace Jones, released on October 6, 2006, by Universal.

== Background ==
Although usually listed as a box set, The Ultimate Collection is packaged in a double gatefold cardboard sleeve, and was released by the Dutch label CCM, a subsidiary of Universal Music Holland. CCM had previously issued similar 3-CD sets by artists like Donna Summer, Barry White, Diana Ross, Kool & the Gang, Dusty Springfield and others.

The Ultimate Collection features songs newly remastered in 32-bit sound. The album includes tracks from Jones' disco period (1976–79), most noticeably the album version of her 1978 hit "Do or Die", which was then available on compact disc for the first time in more than a decade. The Ultimate Collection was not intended to be a singles collection, as several single releases are missing (most notably "On Your Knees", the primary single from the album Muse).

The Ultimate Collection is more or less an expanded re-issue of Universal's The Grace Jones Story, released earlier that same year, with a few notable changes. Disc one omits "That's the Trouble" but adds the aforementioned album version of "Do or Die", "All on a Summers Night" as well as the original long versions of "Private Life", "Love Is the Drug" and "Warm Leatherette". However, Universal did not correct the faulty edit of "Saved" that had also appeared on The Grace Jones Story, which means that the two first minutes of the song were again left out. Disc two uses the album version of "Pull Up to the Bumper" instead of the 7" edit as well as the original long version of "The Hunter Gets Captured by the Game". It adds "Inspiration", "Slave to the Rhythm" (not the well-known single version but the album track that confusingly bears the same title) and "Victor Should Have Been a Jazz Musician", but omits "Someone to Love" and moves "She's Lost Control" and "Sex Drive" to disc three, which otherwise consists of alternate versions previously issued on 1998's Private Life: The Compass Point Sessions.

== Track listing ==
Disc 1
No.	Title	Length
1.	"La Vie en rose"	7:29
2.	"Send in the Clowns"	7:35
3.	"I Need a Man"	3:24
4.	"Do or Die"	6:29
5.	"All on a Summers Night"	4:14
6.	"Fame"	5:34
7.	"Am I Ever Gonna Fall in Love in New York City"	5:27
8.	"Don't Mess with the Messer"	4:53
9.	"Sinning"	5:06
10.	"Saved"	5:00
11.	"Private Life"	6:18
12.	"Love Is the Drug"	8:41
13.	"Warm Leatherette"	5:37
Total length:		1:15:47

Disc 2
No.	Title	Length
1.	"The Hunter Gets Captured by the Game"	6:45
2.	"I've Seen That Face Before"	4:29
3.	"Pull Up to the Bumper"	4:42
4.	"Nightclubbing"	5:05
5.	"Walking in the Rain"	4:20
6.	"Demolition Man"	4:03
7.	"Nipple to the Bottle"	5:57
8.	"The Apple Stretching"	7:08
9.	"Inspiration"	4:35
10.	"My Jamaican Guy"	6:02
11.	"Slave to the Rhythm"	6:13
12.	"I'm Not Perfect (But I'm Perfect for You)"	3:59
13.	"Victor Should Have Been a Jazz Musician"	4:44
14.	"Love on Top of Love"	6:16
Total length:		1:13:48

Disc 3
No.	Title	Length
1.	"Pars" (long version)	5:42
2.	"Private Life" (dub version)	8:06
3.	"Use Me"	6:11
4.	"She's Lost Control" (long version)	8:25
5.	"Nipple to the Bottle" (12″ version)	6:54
6.	"My Jamaican Guy" (12″ version)	7:02
7.	"Ring of Fire"	3:58
8.	"Man Around the House"	4:13
9.	"Living My Life"	3:33
10.	"Slave to the Rhythm" (Hot Blooded version)	8:19
11.	"Sex Drive"	3:58
Total length:		1:06:21

Notes: This CD, just like The Grace Jones Story, skips the first two minutes of "Saved", subsequently starting with the first line of the second verse (original length of the track is 7:13). The version of "Slave to the Rhythm" included here is track five on the Slave to the Rhythm album, not the hit single version. Tracks 1–4 and "Slave to the Rhythm" from disc 3 appear in their 1998 edited forms.
