= The Ultimate (Grace Jones album) =

Compilation album by Grace Jones
- Released: 1993
- Recorded: 1977–1985
- Genres: Disco; reggae; R&B
- Label: Island

Grace Jones chronology
Bulletproof Heart (1989)	The Ultimate (1993)	Private Life: The Compass Point Sessions (1998)

The Ultimate is the second greatest hits album by Jamaican singer and songwriter Grace Jones released in 1993 by Island Records. The album would cover the same material as 1985's Island Life, in addition to four other tracks. The Ultimate was only released in the Netherlands, where it enjoyed considerable success.

== Track listing ==
1. "Slave to the Rhythm" (Edit) – 4:27
2. "Nipple to the Bottle" – 5:58
3. "My Jamaican Guy" – 6:00
4. "Walking in the Rain" – 4:18
5. "La Vie en rose" – 7:26
6. "The Fashion Show" (Edit) – 4:05
7. "I've Seen That Face Before (Libertango)" – 4:29
8. "Do or Die" (Edit) – 3:23
9. "I Need a Man" – 3:23
10. "Private Life" – 6:20
11. "Love Is the Drug" – 8:42
12. "Pull Up to the Bumper" – 4:42
13. "Use Me" – 5:05
14. "Warm Leatherette" – 5:38

== Charts ==
Chart performance for The Ultimate
Chart (1993)	Peak position
Dutch Albums (Album Top 100)	33
