= Cry Now, Laugh Later =

Single by Grace Jones

from the album Living My Life
- B-side: "Nipple to the Bottle"
- Released: January 1983
- Studio: Compass Point Studios (Nassau, Bahamas)
- Genre: Pop; reggae; R&B
- Length: 5:00
- Label: Island
- Songwriters: Grace Jones; Barry Reynolds
- Producers: Alex Sadkin; Chris Blackwell

Grace Jones singles chronology
"My Jamaican Guy" (1983)	"Cry Now, Laugh Later" (1983)	"Living My Life" (1983)

"Cry Now, Laugh Later" is a song by Grace Jones from her 1982 album Living My Life.

== Background ==
The single was released in the US and Canada only, simultaneously with "My Jamaican Guy" which was aimed at the European, Asian and Australian market. The 12" remix of the track, by Steven Stanley, is especially notable in the Grace Jones discography as it differs substantially from the album version. It more or less only retains the lead and backing vocals from the original and has new overdubs of drums, bass and keyboards, with a different chord progression on the choruses. In the UK the Steven Stanley remix of "Cry Now, Laugh Later" was released as the B-side of the "My Jamaican Guy" 12" single. Both the 12" remix and the 12" dub of "Cry Now, Laugh Later" remains as unreleased on CD.

== Track listing ==
- 7-inch single

A. "Cry Now, Laugh Later" – 4:25
B. "Nipple to the Bottle" – 4:17

- 12-inch single

A. "Cry Now, Laugh Later" – 5:51
B1. "Cry Now, Laugh Later" (Dub) – 6:04
B1. "Nipple to the Bottle" (Dub) – 3:40

== Charts ==
Chart (1983)	Peak position
US Dance Club Songs (Billboard)	33
US Hot R&B/Hip-Hop Songs (Billboard)	64
