= Living My Life (album) =

Studio album by Grace Jones
- Released: 1 November 1982
- Recorded: 1982
- Studios: Compass Point (Nassau, Bahamas)
- Genres: Progressive rock; new wave; reggae; R&B
- Length: 37:32
- Label: Island
- Producers: Chris Blackwell; Alex Sadkin

Grace Jones chronology
Nightclubbing (1981)	Living My Life (1982)	Slave to the Rhythm (1985)

Singles from Living My Life
- 1. "Nipple to the Bottle" Released: October 1982; 2. "The Apple Stretching" Released: October 1982; 3. "My Jamaican Guy" Released: January 1983; 4. "Cry Now, Laugh Later" Released: January 1983; 5. "Unlimited Capacity for Love" Released: January 1983

Living My Life is the sixth studio album by Jamaican singer Grace Jones, released in 1982. It was the last of three albums she recorded at the Compass Point Studios in the Bahamas. The album includes one of Jones' signature tunes, "My Jamaican Guy" as well as the single releases "Nipple to the Bottle", "The Apple Stretching" and "Cry Now Laugh Later".

As opposed to Jones' two previous Compass Point albums Nightclubbing and Warm Leatherette having been released as 'Deluxe Editions' as well as the box set Disco including 1977's Portfolio, 1978's Fame and 1979's Muse, all in the 2000's, Living My Life has yet to be re-released in digitally remastered and expanded form.

== Background and production ==
Jones had already recorded two new wave/reggae-oriented albums with the Compass Point All Stars at the Compass Point Studios in Nassau, Bahamas, with the most recent, Nightclubbing, becoming her most successful record to date. She went back into the studio in 1982 to record an album which would be her final offering in the unofficial Compass Point trilogy. This time around, Jones recorded only one cover, "The Apple Stretching", which was originally written by Melvin Van Peebles and used in the Broadway show Waltz of the Stork. "Nipple to the Bottle" was co-written with Sly Dunbar, while, apart from "My Jamaican Guy", the other tracks were collaborations with Barry Reynolds.

The title track "Living My Life", despite receiving a limited single release, was ultimately left off the album. Further outtakes included the track "Man Around the House" (written by Jones and Barry Reynolds), and a cover of Johnny Cash's "Ring of Fire". Both tracks were released on the 1998 compilation Private Life: The Compass Point Sessions.

== Artwork ==
The Living My Life cover picture has been described as famous as the music featured on the record itself. Like the majority of Jones' artwork at that time, this one was created by her then-partner Jean-Paul Goude, this time with an additional contribution from Rob O'Connor. It features the singer's disembodied head cut out from the original photograph and pasted onto a blank white background in a way that gives her head and face an angular shape. A piece of tape, or a plaster, has been pasted over her left eyebrow, and her forehead is covered with drops of water, or sweat. This cover, as many other Goude's designs for Jones, has won critical acclaim and has been an inspiration for other artists ever since.

The picture was re-used for the cover of the 2006 compilation Colour Collection, a re-release of The Universal Masters Collection.

== Promotion ==
According to Billboard magazine, in 1982, Grace Jones was an early pioneer in the direct-mail marketing of music videos, a strategy later used by bands like The Police. A joint agreement between Island Records and Vestron Video placed a flyer for a mail-order performance film inside the first 100,000 copies of Living My Life. The video cassette was offered at a promotional price of $39.95. Per the Billboard report, the campaign targeted a very select group of fans, and while innovative, VHS sales ultimately accounted for only about 25% of the promotion's total sales figures.

== Singles ==
The urban-flavoured "Nipple to the Bottle" and reggae-oriented "The Apple Stretching" were released simultaneously as lead singles. "Nipple to the Bottle" received a worldwide release, becoming a highly popular dance track in the US, as well as a top three hit in New Zealand. The latter was not released in the North America and achieved only moderate success in Europe.

Three more singles were then simultaneously released in January 1983, of which "My Jamaican Guy" turned out the most successful. "Cry Now, Laugh Later", released only in the US and Canada, and "Unlimited Capacity for Love" did not chart.

Just like the singles from Jones' two previous Compass Point albums all five titles were released in a wide range of single edits, extended remixes and dub versions throughout the world. The most radical of these were Steven Stanley's extended remix and dub version of "Cry Now, Laugh Later" which more or less only retained the lead and backing vocals from the album track. Alternative versions of both "My Jamaican Guy" and the non-album track "Living My Life" also appeared in the video version of Jones' A One Man Show in 1982.

The track "Living My Life" indeed has a somewhat unusual release history in the Grace Jones discography; it was recorded during the album sessions and gave the set its title and also appeared in the One Man Show video. The decision was however taken not to include the track in the actual album. Despite this it was still released commercially as a 12" single in 1983, including two remixes - but only in one country: Portugal.. Three years later it was again remixed and released as the B-side to the also remixed and re-issued version of "Love Is the Drug" to promote the compilation Island Life in Europe.. Only in 1998 the track was released worldwide when Eric 'E.T.' Thorngren's 1986 7" remix of the recording was included in the compilation Private Life: The Compass Point Sessions.

In 1997 "My Jamaican Guy" was remixed and included on the soundtrack to the movie 'Dancehall Queen', then as a duet with Jamaican rapper Bounty Killer. In 2006 that version was re-released worldwide as a digital only single featuring 8 further remixes.

In 2010, "Inspiration" was remixed to a 7:14 "Leroc Sportif Edit" and released as a one-track digital only single in February.

== Critical reception ==
Professional ratings
Review scores
Source	Rating
AllMusic	3/5 stars
Robert Christgau	B+

Cash Box wrote "this LP boasts some of 'Jones' most accessible material to date", while The Boston Phoenix said it was "not a satisfying Grace Jones record" because it was "nearly crushed by filler". Robert Christgau questioned the appeal of Jones's "statuesque if not motionless voice", but praised her backing band and noted that "each album edges her a little closer to her material". He singled out "Everybody Hold Still" and "The Apple Stretching", adding that three other tracks suggested that Jean-Paul Goude "doesn't know the half of her". AllMusic praised the "nice material" and "excellent production and arrangements", but criticized Jones's performances as "distant and detached".

== Commercial performance ==
Following 1981's Nightclubbing, Island Records' re-release of Jones' previous effort Warm Leatherette that same year as well as the A One Man Show tour in North America, Europe and Australasia in 1981-1982, Living My Life became another commercial success. The album peaked at #3 in New Zealand, #7 in Sweden, #13 in Norway, #15 in the UK, #18 in the Netherlands and #19 on Billboard's US Top R&B/Hip-Hop Albums chart. In March 1983, Island Records vice president Herb Corsack claimed to Billboard magazine that the sales of the album had surpassed 400,000 copies.

== Track listing ==
All tracks produced by Chris Blackwell and Alex Sadkin.

Side one
No.	Title	Writer(s)	Length
1.	"My Jamaican Guy"	Grace Jones	6:00
2.	"Nipple to the Bottle"	Sly Dunbar; Jones	5:55
3.	"The Apple Stretching"	Melvin Van Peebles	7:08

Side two
No.	Title	Writer(s)	Length
4.	"Everybody Hold Still"	Barry Reynolds; Jones	3:10
5.	"Cry Now, Laugh Later"	Jones; Reynolds	5:00
6.	"Inspiration"	Jones; Reynolds	4:35
7.	"Unlimited Capacity for Love"	Jones; Reynolds	5:45

== Personnel ==
- Benji Armbrister – engineering assistance
- Wally Badarou – keyboards
- Chris Blackwell – production
- Michael Brauer – mixing (track 6)
- Mikey Chung – guitar
- Sly Dunbar – drums, syndrum
- Jean-Paul Goude – design, sleeve photography
- Grace Jones – vocals
- Rob O'Connor – design
- Barry Reynolds – guitar
- Trevor Rogers – photography
- Alex Sadkin – organ, production, engineering, mixing (tracks 5 and 7)
- Robbie Shakespeare – bass guitar
- Steven Stanley – engineering, mixing (tracks 1, 2, 3, 4)
- Uziah "Sticky" Thompson – percussion
- Ted Jensen at Sterling Sound, NYC – mastering

== Charts ==
=== Weekly charts ===
Weekly chart performance for Living My Life
Chart (1982–1983)	Peak position
Australian Albums (Kent Music Report)	34
Dutch Albums (Album Top 100)	18
German Albums (Offizielle Top 100)	46
New Zealand Albums (RMNZ)	3
Norwegian Albums (VG-lista)	13
Swedish Albums (Sverigetopplistan)	7
UK Albums (Official Charts)	15
US Billboard 200	86
US Top R&B/Hip-Hop Albums (Billboard)	19

=== Year-end charts ===
Year-end chart performance for Living My Life
Chart (1983)	Position
New Zealand Albums (RMNZ)	7

== Certifications and sales ==
Certifications and sales for Living My Life
Region	Certification	Certified units/sales
New Zealand (RMNZ)	Platinum	15,000^{^}
United States	—	400,000
Yugoslavia	—	20,427
^{^} Shipments figures based on certification alone.

== Release history ==
Region	Year	Format(s)	Label
Worldwide	1982	LP, Cassette	Island
Yugoslavia	1983	LP	Jugoton, Island
Europe	1989	CD	Island Masters
