= Pull Up to the Bumper =

1981 single by Grace Jones

- Artwork for 1986 single re-release

Single by Grace Jones

from the album Nightclubbing
- B-side: "Feel Up"; "Breakdown"; "La Vie en rose"; "Nipple to the Bottle"
- Released: June 1981
- Studio: Compass Point Studios, Nassau, The Bahamas
- Genre: Post-disco; dance-pop; reggae-disco; synth-funk; R&B
- Length: 3:40 (single version); 4:41 (album version)
- Label: Island
- Composers: Kookoo Baya; Grace Jones; Dana Mano
- Lyricist: Grace Jones
- Producers: Chris Blackwell; Alex Sadkin

Grace Jones singles chronology
"I've Seen That Face Before (Libertango)" (1981)	"Pull Up to the Bumper" (1981)	"Walking in the Rain" (1981)
"Jones the Rhythm" (1985)	"Pull Up to the Bumper" (1986)	"Love Is the Drug" (1986)

Music video
- "Pull Up to the Bumper" on YouTube

"Pull Up to the Bumper" is a song by Jamaican singer, songwriter, model and actress Grace Jones, released in June 1981 by Island Records as the third single from her fifth album, Nightclubbing (1981). Sonically, it is an uptempo electro-disco, post-punk, dance-pop and reggae-disco song with dub production, "pulsing drums and chic new-wave licks", as well as being described as a hybrid of funk and R&B. Its lyrics were written by Jones alone, while she, along with Kookoo Baya and Dana Manno, are credited as its composers. The song's instrumental part was originally recorded in 1980 during the Warm Leatherette sessions; however, it did not make the album as Chris Blackwell found its sound not fitting in the rest of the material. It was completed for the 1981 critically acclaimed Nightclubbing album and became its third single in June 1981. The song peaked at number two on the US Billboard Hot Dance Club Songs chart and number 53 on the UK Singles Chart. When re-released in 1986, it peaked at number 12 in the UK. The track has come to be one of Jones' signature tunes and her first transatlantic hit.

The song sparked controversy for its sexually suggestive lyrics, prompting some radio stations to refuse to broadcast it. Among the lines are "Pull up to my bumper baby / In your long black limousine / Pull up to my bumper baby / Drive it in between", "Grease it / Spray it / Let me lubricate it" and "I've got to blow your horn." However, in a 2008 interview with Q magazine, Jones suggested that the lyrics were not necessarily meant to be interpreted as a metaphor for anal sex.

== Release ==
Over the years, "Pull Up to the Bumper" has been remixed several times. The original 12-inch single featured the unedited album master recording as an extended mix of 6m45s. There also appears to be an untitled long album version lasting 5m48s which can be found on the US Rebound Records/Polygram Records World of Dance: The 80's compilation CD. An extended dub version lasting 7m17s also known as "Remixed Version" was included as the B-side on the 12-inch release of Jones' "Walking in the Rain"; this version can be found on the Universal Music compilation CD 12"/80s. The "Walking in the Rain" 7" single also had an alternate dub mix as the B-side, called "Peanut Butter" and credited to the Compass Point All Stars. The full mix of "Peanut Butter" lasting 7m02s as well as "Pull Up to the Bumper"'s "Party Version" lasting 5m01s can be found on the US Hip-O Records/Universal Music In Good Company CD by Sly & Robbie.

In 1985, the track was remixed and re-released to promote the Island Life compilation, and was released in two different 12-inch single mixes, one an extended mix with additional keyboard overdubs and remix by Paul "Groucho" Smykle, which can be found on both the Rodeo Media 2011 Dance Classics - Pop Edition Vol. 4 2CD Compilation and the very rare EVA Records 1986 Now Dance compilation CD. The other, an eight-minute megamix entitled "Musclemix", which included excerpts from tracks like "Warm Leatherette", "Walking in the Rain", "Use Me", "Love Is the Drug" and "Slave to the Rhythm", remains unreleased on CD.

== Critical reception ==
Terry Nelson from Albumism commented in his review of Nightclubbing, "Many critics loved the playful double entendre, but if you were listening carefully, you could tell that it was a pretty blunt statement. She was not pulling any punches. It was a song that could've been ripped out of the pages of the Penthouse forum set to an infectious, funky beat: "Pull up to my bumper baby / In your long black limousine / Pull up to my bumper baby / And drive it in between"." The Daily Vault's Mark Millan named it an "instant Jones classic", and noted that the singer "peppered the lyric with a swell of sexual innuendos". Music critic and writer Glenn O'Brien named "Pull Up to the Bumper" "Grace's first car radio hit".

== Chart performance ==
Upon its release, the song spent seven weeks at number two on the US Billboard Hot Dance Club Play chart, as well as becoming a Top 5 single on the Billboard R&B chart. The original 1981 release peaked at number 53 on the UK Singles Chart. When it was re-released in 1985, then with the 1977 recording of "La Vie en rose" as the B-side, it reached number 12 on the UK singles chart in early 1986. The song then finally charted in Ireland and West Germany, and became the singer's best-seller.

== Impact and legacy ==
The song was ranked at number eight among the top 10 "Tracks of the Year" for 1981 by NME. In 2004, Q magazine featured it in their list of "The 1010 Songs You Must Own". In 2005, Blender ranked it number 88 in their list of "Greatest Songs Since You Were Born". In 2011, The Guardian's Richard Vine ranked the release of "Pull Up to the Bumper" as one of 50 key events in the history of dance music, proclaiming it "one of those rare records that manages to replicate the sensation of actually being in a club." Pitchfork Media featured it in their list of "50 Songs That Define the Last 50 Years of LGBTQ+ Pride" in 2018. Same year, Time Out ranked it number 41 in their "The 50 Best '80s Songs" list.

Spin ranked it as one of "The 30 Best Disco Songs That Every Millennial Should Know" in 2019. Slant Magazine placed "Pull Up to the Bumper" at number 64 in their list of "The 100 Best Dance Songs of All Time" in 2020. Rolling Stone ranked it number 84 in their list of "200 Greatest Dance Songs of All Time" in 2022. In October 2023, Billboard magazine ranked it number 65 in their list of "The 100 Best Pop Songs Never to Hit the Hot 100", writing that "Grace Jones' shimmering and highly euphemistic post-disco clarion call made for arguably her most irresistible pop single." In 2025, they ranked it numbers 82 and 46 in their lists of "The 100 Best Dance Songs of All Time" and "The 100 Greatest LGBTQ+ Anthems of All Time".

=== Accolades ===
Year	Publisher	Country	Accolade	Rank
2003	Paul Morley	United Kingdom	"Greatest Pop Single of All Time"	*
2004	Q	United Kingdom	"The 1010 Songs You Must Own"	*
2005	Blender	United States	"Greatest Songs Since You Were Born"	88
2011	The Guardian	United Kingdom	"A History of Modern Music: Dance"	*
2016	NME	United Kingdom	"Tracks of the Year: 1981"	8
2016	NME	United Kingdom	"The 20 Best Disco Songs of All Time"	*
2018	Pitchfork Media	United States	"50 Songs That Define the Last 50 Years of LGBTQ+ Pride"	*
2018	Time Out	United Kingdom	"The 50 Best '80s Songs"	41
2019	Spin	United States	"The 30 Best Disco Songs That Every Millennial Should Know"	*
2020	Slant Magazine	United States	"The 100 Best Dance Songs of All Time"	64
2022	Rolling Stone	United States	"200 Greatest Dance Songs of All Time"	84
2023	Billboard	United States	"The 100 Best Pop Songs Never to Hit the Hot 100"	65
2025	Billboard	United States	"The 100 Best Dance Songs of All Time"	82
2025	Billboard	United States	"The 100 Greatest LGBTQ+ Anthems of All Time"	46

(*) indicates the list is unordered.

== Music video ==
The accompanying music video for "Pull Up to the Bumper" is a combination of live footage of Jones performing the song on her A One Man Show merged and edited alongside excerpts from Godfrey Reggio's 1982 experimental documentary film Koyaanisqatsi. The video uses the edited studio version of the song and its opening section includes the drum intro from Jones' version of the song "Nightclubbing".

Another music video for the song was produced, also using the same live footage, cut and re-edited, but this time retaining the original concert soundtrack. The video ends with Jones jumping from the stage into the audience.

== Track listing ==
- 7-inch single (1981)

A. "Pull Up to the Bumper" – 3:40
B. "Feel Up" – 4:02

- 7-inch single (US, 1981)

A. "Pull Up to the Bumper" – 3:40
B. "Breakdown" – 3:00

- 12-inch single (1981)

A. "Pull Up to the Bumper" (long version) – 5:45
B. "Feel Up" (Long Version) – 6:14

- 12-inch promotional single (US, 1981)

A. "Pull Up to the Bumper" (album version) – 4:30
B. "Pull Up to the Bumper" (party version) – 5:45

- 7-inch single (1985)

A. "Pull Up to the Bumper" – 3:40
B. "La Vie en rose" – 3:35

- 12-inch single (1985)

A. "Pull Up to the Bumper" (Remix) – 6:24
B1. "La Vie en rose" – 7:24
B2. "Nipple to the Bottle" – 5:55

- 12-inch single (UK, 1985)

A. "Pull Up to the Bumper" – 4:40
B. "Nipple to the Bottle" – 6:57

- 12-inch single (UK, 1986)

A. "Grace Jones Musclemix" – 9:12
B1. "La Vie en rose" – 7:24
B2. "Pull Up to the Bumper" (Remix) – 6:24

- 12-inch single (Canada, 1986)

A. "Grace Jones Musclemix" – 9:12
B1. "Pull Up to the Bumper" (Remix) – 6:29
B2. "Nipple to the Bottle" – 5:55

- Cassette single (1986)
1. "Pull Up to the Bumper" (Remix) – 6:29
2. "Nipple to the Bottle" – 5:55
3. "La Vie en rose" – 7:24
4. "Peanut Butter" – 5:10

== Personnel ==
- Grace Jones – vocals, backing vocals
- Sly Dunbar – drums, syndrums
- Robbie Shakespeare – bass guitar
- Barry Reynolds – guitar
- Mikey Chung – guitar
- Wally Badarou – keyboards
- Uziah Thompson – percussion

== Charts ==
Chart (1981–86)	Peak position
Australia (Kent Music Report)	67
Belgium (Ultratop)	14
Belgium (Ultratop); 1986 re-release	35
European Top 100 Singles (Eurotipsheet); 1986 re-release	16
Finland (Suomen virallinen lista); 1986 re-release	13
Ireland (IRMA); 1986 re-release	10
Israel (Israeli Singles Chart); 1986 re-release	13
Luxembourg (Radio Luxembourg); 1986 re-release	10
Netherlands (Dutch Top 40)	20
Netherlands (Single Top 100)	16
New Zealand (RIANZ)	14
New Zealand (RIANZ); 1986 re-release	13
Spain (Productores de Música de España)	37
UK Singles (OCC)	53
UK Singles (OCC); 1986 re-release	12
US Bubbling Under Hot 100 (Billboard)	1
US Hot Dance Club Play (Billboard)	2
US Hot R&B/Hip-Hop Songs (Billboard)	5
US Cash Box Top 100	95
US Cash Box Black Contemporary Top 100	3
West Germany (GfK Entertainment Charts); 1986 re-release	26

== Certifications ==
Certifications and sales for "Pull Up to the Bumber"
Region	Certification	Certified units/sales
United Kingdom (BPI)	Silver	200,000^{‡}
^{‡} Sales+streaming figures based on certification alone.

== Patra version ==
"Pull Up to the Bumper"

Single by Patra

from the album Scent of Attraction
- B-side: "Whining Skill"
- Released: July 18, 1995
- Genre: Reggae; hip hop
- Length: 4:50
- Label: 550 Music; Epic
- Lyricist: Grace Jones
- Producer: C. "Specialist" Dillon

Patra singles chronology
"Romantic Call" (1994)	"Pull Up to the Bumper" (1995)	"Dip and Fall Back" (1995)

Music video
- "Pull Up to the Bumper" on YouTube

"Pull Up to the Bumper" was covered by Jamaican reggae/dancehall singer Patra in July 1995, released by 550 Music and Epic Records as the first single from her second album, Scent of Attraction (1995). The song was produced by C. "Specialist" Dillon and became the singer's most successful international hit. It reached number 60 on the US Billboard Hot 100, number 21 on the Billboard R&B chart, and number 15 on the Billboard dance chart. "Pull Up to the Bumper" also reached number 78 in Australia, number 12 in New Zealand, and number 50 in the UK. The accompanying music video was a Box Top on British music television channel The Box in September 1995.

=== Critical reception ===
Larry Flick from Billboard magazine wrote, "Dancehall siren previews her new Whining Skills album with a fairly faithful rendition of the Grace Jones disco/funk chestnut. Patra's sturdy talent as a singer is put to good use here, and her toasting is far more pleasing to the ear than on previous efforts. Track is right in the pocket of both R&B and crossover radio trends and could eventually prove to be the artist's biggest record yet."

Gil Robertson IV from Cash Box commented, "Lady Patra is back with an intoxicating remake of Grace Jones' classic disco hit. Girlfriend delivers the goods with an over the top, spicy and provocative cover This track will be an across-the-board winner on several formats and offers a great opener for Patra's new release, Scent of Attraction." A reviewer from Music & Media asked, "Still the queen of ragga or has Diana King overtaken her? First single [...] stays too faithful to the Grace Jones original to close the gap with her immediate rival." In a separate review, the magazine noted, "Apart from the rap in the middle and the backing singers, the difference isn't actually as big as you would've assumed."

=== Track listing ===
- 12" single, US (1995)

A1: "Pull Up to the Bumper" (LP Version) – 4:50
A2: "Pull Up to the Bumper" (Salaam's Extended Party Mix) – 4:46
A3: "Pull Up to the Bumper" (Harder Anthem) – 4:59
B1: "Pull Up to the Bumper" (Salaam's Party Mix Instrumental) – 4:44
B2: "Pull Up to the Bumper" (Harder Dub) – 4:59

- CD maxi, Europe (1995)
1. "Pull Up to the Bumper" (Radio Edit) – 4:09
2. "Pull Up to the Bumper" (Salaam's Extended Party Mix) – 4:11
3. "Pull Up to the Bumper" (Bumpa Anthem) – 4:09
4. "Pull Up to the Bumper" (Harder Anthem) – 4:59
5. "Pull Up to the Bumper" (Horny Mix) – 3:58
6. "Pull Up to the Bumper" (Old Skool [Jungle] Mix) – 5:47
7. "Pull Up to the Bumper" (Drum And Bass [Jungle] Mix) – 5:44

=== Charts ===
Chart (1995)	Peak position
Australia (ARIA)	78
Europe (European Dance Radio)	24
New Zealand (RIANZ)	12
UK Singles (OCC)	50
US Billboard Hot 100	60
US Hot Dance Club Play (Billboard)	15
US Hot R&B/Hip-Hop Songs (Billboard)	21
US Maxi-Singles Sales (Billboard)	7
US Cash Box Top 100	64

== Later versions ==
- Coolio sampled the song on his 1997 single "Ooh La La", from the album My Soul.
- Another version was released by an Australian R&B singer Deni Hines, which featured in the 2000 film The Wog Boy. It reached number 36 on the Australian ARIA Singles Chart in February 2000.
- Also in 2000, short lived British band Made in London recorded "Pull Up to the Bumper" as a B-side for their only charting single "Dirty Water".
- Danish artist Funkstar De Luxe remixed the song with Jones' original vocals, and released it as a single in late 2000, with an accompanying music video. The song reached number four on the US Billboard dance chart and number 60 on the UK Singles Chart.
- Bands Gossip and LCD Soundsystem performed the song together at the Coachella festival in 2010.
