= A One Man Show =

- Directed by: Jean-Paul Goude
- Starring: Grace Jones
- Distributed by: Universal Pictures
- Release date: 1982
- Running time: 47 minutes
- Language: English

A One Man Show is a long-form music video collection featuring Jamaican singer Grace Jones, released in 1982. The video mainly consists of music videos, with some concert footage filmed when Jones was touring with the eponymous tour.

== Background ==
The video partly captures live performances of Jones' "A One Man Show" tour which was filmed at London's Drury Lane Theatre and at the Savoy Theater in New York City in 1981. It includes six songs performed live on stage, mostly from the Warm Leatherette and Nightclubbing albums, plus four studio music videos. The show's intro is a photo montage of some of the most famous images of Jones from the late 1970s and early 1980s, including the "tiger in a cage" portrait and the "arabesque" photo.

A One Man Show was first released in 1982 to promote the album Living My Life. The film was re-issued on VHS and LaserDisc by Island Records, PolyGram and Spectrum Music through the 1980s and early 1990s. In 1986, after the success of Jones' best-selling hit "Slave to the Rhythm", the film was re-released under the title State of Grace, then also including its promo video.

The film was directed by Jean-Paul Goude and edited by Peter Shelton. It was nominated for a Grammy Award for Best Long Form Music Video in 1984, eventually losing to Duran Duran's self-titled video.

Snapshots from the performances of "Warm Leatherette" and "Walking in the Rain" later made the artwork for the CD re-release of Warm Leatherette.

== Set list ==
1. "Warm Leatherette" (intro includes excerpts from "Nightclubbing")
2. "Walking in the Rain"
3. "Feel Up"
4. "La Vie en rose"
5. "Demolition Man"
6. "Pull Up to the Bumper"
7. "Private Life"
8. "My Jamaican Guy"
9. "Living My Life"
10. "I've Seen That Face Before (Libertango)"
