= Nightclubbing (Grace Jones album) =

Studio album by Grace Jones
- Released: 11 May 1981
- Recorded: 1980–1981
- Studios: Compass Point, the Bahamas
- Genres: Post-disco; new wave; disco; funk; reggae; dance; sophisti-pop; R&B
- Length: 38:40
- Label: Island
- Producers: Chris Blackwell; Alex Sadkin

Grace Jones chronology
Warm Leatherette (1980)	Nightclubbing (1981)	Living My Life (1982)

Singles from Nightclubbing
- 1. "Demolition Man" Released: February 1981; 2. "I've Seen That Face Before (Libertango)" Released: May 1981; 3. "Pull Up to the Bumper" Released: June 1981; 4. "Use Me" Released: June 1981; 5. "Feel Up" Released: July 1981; 6. "Walking in the Rain" Released: October 1981

Nightclubbing is the fifth studio album by Jamaican singer Grace Jones, released on 11 May 1981 by Island Records. Recorded at Compass Point Studios with producers Alex Sadkin and Island Records' president Chris Blackwell, as well as a team of session musicians rooted by rhythm section Sly and Robbie, the album marked her second foray into a new wave style that blends a variety of genres, including reggae, R&B, dub and funk. The album has cover versions of songs by Bill Withers, Iggy Pop, Astor Piazzolla, and others, and original songs, three of which were co-written by Jones.

The album received positive reviews upon its release, including being voted best album of the year by writers of the UK music magazine NME, and has continued to be praised by critics over time, with some reviewers commending the singer's unique sound and organic fusion of genres. The album entered in the top 10 in five countries, and became Jones' highest-ranking record on the US Billboard 200 and R&B charts. Six singles were released from the album, including the hits "Pull Up to the Bumper" and "I've Seen That Face Before (Libertango)".

Critics and scholars have noted the album's influence on popular music, citing its unique sound that has been emulated by both pop and alternative acts, and how the persona Jones adopted — deeply inspired by art and fashion — has had an enduring influence on modern female pop singers. Around the time of the album's release, she adopted her characteristic androgynous look which would become popular in fashion. Nightclubbing is now widely considered Jones' magnum opus and the record that cemented her pop icon status.

== Background and production ==
"When we were in the studio with Grace, there was a big picture of her – a big picture, going right across – on the wall of the studio, then she'd be standing there singing, so when we were playing and getting a groove all we could see was her. We took it on that reggae kind of trip, but always with Grace in mind."

— Drummer Sly Dunbar (of Sly and Robbie), Fact, 2014

Jones was a popular fashion model and Studio 54 habituée before starting her recording career. Her first three albums "were heavily influenced by disco and cemented her presence in the club scene." These records "operated around the campier end of the spectrum," and built a large gay cult following around the singer. According to Pitchfork, these albums "were fun but somewhat facile, cover-filled reflections of the druggy hedonism of the disco era". T. Cole Rachel writes: "For someone whose very image was seen as somehow deeply transgressive, Jones' music had not yet caught up." When her 1977 rendition of Edith Piaf's "La Vie en rose" was an international hit, she caught the interest of Chris Blackwell, the founder of Island Records. After Jones' 1979 album Muse found little success in nightclubs and charts, he took over as her producer. He sought to "treat her not as a model, but to involve her as a musician", and wanted "her to feel as though she were a member of a band, and record her the way bands used to make albums, with the singer and the players doing their thing all at once." Blackwell assembled a sextet of studio ringers at his Nassau studio, Compass Point, pulling together a band that included Sly and Robbie (consisting of bass guitarist Robbie Shakespeare and drummer Sly Dunbar), French keyboardist Wally Badarou, guitarists Mikey Chung and Barry Reynolds, and percussionist Uziah Thompson. Jones has described the group as "the united nations in the studio".

As the disco backlash began in earnest, Jones veered towards the contemporary new wave style. Blackwell had been impressed by Black Uhuru's 1980 album Sinsemilla and, along with engineer Alex Sadkin, decided that Jones' new sound should take elements from that record's sonority. Besides reggae, the band also incorporated dance music. Sly Dunbar said, "We loved dance music, we'd listen to everything, because we were always working and wanting the reggae we did to move a bit forward, so anything that we could drag to it, we would bring that – as ideas, or as musicians coming to play with us." Ditching the camp quality of Jones' previous work, Blackwell realised new forms around the likes of The Pretenders' "Private Life", Roxy Music's "Love Is the Drug" and The Normal's "Warm Leatherette"; Ian Wade of The Quietus writes: "Nightclubbing was where all these ideas coalesced into perfection." The band Blackwell assembled later became known as the "Compass Point Allstars", taking up residency in the Bahamian studio and animating hits by Tom Tom Club, Robert Palmer, Joe Cocker and Gwen Guthrie, among others.

The recording sessions "moved with disarming speed and ease"; Blackwell recounts: "If Grace or the group hadn't nailed a song by the third take, it was dropped and they'd move to the next number." Although the band was initially called upon in early 1980 to work on a single album, they ended up recording far more material than could fit one LP. As a result, these sessions resulted in two studio albums: Warm Leatherette – released in 1980 – and Nightclubbing. Final overdubs and additional songs were recorded during 1981. Wally Badarou has recognised Jones' active role in the sessions, stating: "Grace was there even during most instrumental overdubbing sessions. She was a part of the sound and the spirit that came out almost from nowhere. We all knew we were in for something quite experimental."

== Composition ==
=== Style ===
"I wanted a rhythmic reggae bottom, aggressive rock guitar, atmospheric keyboards in the middle, and Grace on top."

— Producer Chris Blackwell, The Pitchfork Review, 2015

Continuing the orientation of Jones' previous release Warm Leatherette, Nightclubbing is a pop album that forays into new wave and dance. A post-disco album, It features a distinct sound that also incorporates rock, funk and post-punk music. The Rolling Stone Album Guide (1992) reads: "Leavening their sprung riddims with a salty dash of funk, Sly and Robbie hipped Jones to rock's new wave on Warm Leatherette and Nightclubbing." John Daniel Bull of The Line of Best Fit felt the album "[pinpointed] the peak of [Jones'] Jamaican influences, by way of reggae rhythms blended with R&B beats." The Style Con's Erich Kessel felt the album was an influential exponent of art-pop. Nightclubbing also incorporates elements of electro, and New York club music. According to John Doran of BBC Music, Nightclubbing is a "post-punk pop" album that, "delved into the worlds of disco, reggae and funk much more successfully than most of her 'alternative' contemporaries, while still retaining a blank-eyed alienation that was more reminiscent of David Bowie or Ian Curtis than most of her peers." The influence of David Bowie (who co-wrote the title track) was also noted by Joe Muggs of Fact.

The "languid reggae-influenced" tracks allowed Jones to showcase her singular vocal style, characterized by low alto singing and a Jamaican style of vocal delivery – "that of 'chatting' over onto tracks" – within a framework of androgyny. This style of delivery has been likened to that of The Velvet Underground's Lou Reed, Blondie's Debbie Harry, the New York City punk scene, and Gil Scott-Heron in "The Revolution Will Not Be Televised". Pitchfork described Jones' voice as a "flat monotone speak-singing." T. Cole Rachel, writing for the same publication, argued that Jones succeeds not by the power of her voice, but by the power of her persona, writing: "As she would go on to prove in later efforts, it was the monolithic force of her personality—imperious, feral, queer in the truest sense of the word—that would make these songs so compelling. She is, to put it simply, impossible to ignore."

=== Songs ===
"Feel Up"

The original version of "Libertango" was discovered by Jones's boyfriend at the time, artist Jean-Paul Goude, and the video for the song was filmed on the outdoor terrace of Jones's penthouse apartment on 16th Street in New York. The song also features a verse sung in French: the text was translated for Jones by Blackwell's girlfriend, actress Nathalie Delon, for which Delon received a writing credit. Two of the album's tracks, "I've Done It Again" and "Demolition Man" were written specifically for Jones to record on Nightclubbing. The latter song was written by Sting and would also be recorded in a more uptempo style by his band the Police for their album Ghost in the Machine, released six months after Nightclubbing.

The remaining three new compositions on the record were all co-written by Jones. "Pull Up to the Bumper" began as an instrumental track by the Compass Point Allstars rhythm section Sly and Robbie (credited on the track under their collective alias "Koo Koo Baya"), and provisionally called "Pour Yourself Over Me Like Peanut Butter". Jones's friend, singer Dana Mano, came up with the song's new title, which inspired the two women to write a set of suggestive lyrics for the track. Despite this, Jones denied that the lyrics were explicitly sexual, insisting that she felt the words were just written to suit the music, but stated that she was happy to accept whatever interpretation someone might put on the lyrics, saying, "I don't want to sing sweet things, though I don't mind sweetness so long as it has a little sour meaning underneath". Jones admitted that "Art Groupie" was highly autobiographical as many of her boyfriends had been artists and she was attracted to the whole art scene.

== Artwork ==
=== Cover ===
Nightclubbing's famous artwork is a 1981 painted photograph titled Blue-Black in Black on Brown, created in New York by Goude. This was the singular image that accompanied the original LP, as it "was concealed in a plain, black inner sleeve, no lyrics and with no photo on the back cover." Composed by right angles, the photograph shows Jones cut to waist, bare chested, and dressed in an Armani man's wide shouldered suit, with an unlit cigarette aiming downward from her lip. She is shot with her signature flat top haircut and her chest bones showing; her dark skin confers upon the image a violet, blue-black colour. The image is noted for its androgyny, with Jones not only "[unpicking] some of the boundaries of unconventionality, but [choosing] to confuse such boundaries." Rick Poynor writes: "Goude admired Jones for her mixture of beauty and threat, and the Nightclubbing portrait expresses this duality with absolute composure and no false histrionics." Piers Martin of Uncut felt the cover was "arresting", and wrote: "the indigo mood, cool gaze and cigarette suggested Marlene Dietrich, the gender-bending a touch of Bowie."

In 2015, Dazed included the album cover in an article dedicated to their "favourite Armani cult crossovers." Biju Belinky wrote:

Although Armani became known for deconstructing the suit, removing the over-the-top padding and offering a relaxed option to formalwear in American Gigolo, the cover for Grace Jones' iconic 1981 album Nightclubbing plays up with the angles like nothing else before it. Hailed as a pioneer of the androgynous look, with a cigarette dangling from her mouth and a flattop haircut, complemented by the padded shoulders of an Armani jacket, the avant-garde singer's album cover became known for years to come.

Writing for DIY, Simon Russell Beale listed the album cover as one of the greatest of all time, highlighting Jones' "smouldering noir-bisexuality". Graphic designer Storm Thorgerson included the picture in his 1999 book, 100 Best Album Covers. Moreover, American Photo placed it in its list of The 30 Best Album Covers. NME included it in its list of 20 Original Album Covers That Are Actually Works of Art, with the entry reading: "Can any other artist boast as many iconic album covers? Grace is a work of art herself, as are the covers for Island Life, Slave to the Rhythm and Living My Life, but best of all is the louche image of Nightclubbing by Jean-Paul Goude, part Tretchikoff's Green Lady, part the best advert for smoking you've ever seen." Time Out listed the image as one of the "sexiest album covers of all time", with Brent DiCrescenzo writing: "[Grace Jones] was a work of art, a statue." According to i-D, "it was a series of consistently stellar album artwork that helped propel [the singer] from musician to icon." The artwork was held in display at the Padiglione d'Arte Contemporanea in Milan, Italy, as part of the 2016 So Far So Goude exhibition, focused on the French artist.

=== Video ===
According to Barry Waters of The Pitchfork Review, "Jones' singular appearance and meticulously crafted presentation made her a natural fit for the burgeoning music video medium, especially in its early, experimental days." Jean-Paul Goude directed the music videos for "I've Seen That Face Before (Libertango)" and "Pull Up to the Bumper", as well as the celebrated 1982 VHS release A One Man Show. The latter – a montage of still photography, concert footage and music videos – "asserted [Jones] as an astute visual artist" and was nominated for Best Long Form Music Video at the 26th Annual Grammy Awards. Nelson George, reviewing the release for Billboard in early 1983, called it "one of the more fascinating and defiantly visual concert videos yet produced." According to Ernest Hardy of CraveOnline, the film "seamlessly blends cabaret, performance art and underground nightclub cool."

== Release ==
Nightclubbing became Jones' chart breakthrough and remains one of the greatest commercial triumphs of her entire career. It entered the top five in no less than four countries, and became the singer's highest-charting record on the US Billboard mainstream albums and R&B charts. The album brought Jones from being a former disco diva with a loyal cult following but dropping sales figures to an international star with mainstream chart success. It later formed the basis of her groundbreaking concept tour A One Man Show.

Universal Music Group re-released the album on vinyl in 2009.

Release of a two-disc deluxe set, containing most of the 12" single versions of singles, plus two unreleased tracks from the Nightclubbing sessions, occurred on 28 April 2014, and Jones enjoyed a UK top 50 chart placing the following week – her first since 2008.

To promote the album, Jones appeared on various TV shows in 1981, including the French Palmarès, the Spanish Esta noche, and Aktuelle Schaubude in West Germany.

== Singles ==
The lead single from the album was "Demolition Man". The single was not a commercial success and did not chart, although would later become one of Jones' signature songs. "I've Seen That Face Before (Libertango)" was released as the second single and became one of the most commercially successful songs in Jones' repertoire. It secured top 20 positions in several European countries and became another signature song for Jones.

The R&B-dance track "Pull Up to the Bumper" was a quick follow-up to "Libertango". It met with a great success on the US club market, but turned out a modest hit in Europe upon original release. The song would re-emerge in Europe in 1985 as a major success, especially in the UK, where backed with "La Vie en rose" it became one of Jones' highest-charting singles in that country.

"Use Me" and "Feel Up" were then released as singles, but were unsuccessful in the charts. The final single off Nightclubbing, "Walking in the Rain", was a minor chart success.

== Critical reception ==
Professional ratings
Review scores
Source	Rating
AllMusic	4.5/5 stars
Christgau's Record Guide	B−
Mojo	5/5 stars
Pitchfork	9.0/10
Q	4/5 stars
Record Collector	4/5 stars
Record Mirror	4/5 stars
The Rolling Stone Album Guide	3.5/5 stars
Smash Hits	8/10
Uncut	9/10

=== Original release ===
In the UK Adrian Thrills of NME said, "I spent an otherwise-miserable weekend afternoon with the sound of Grace swirling around my little earphones, grooving on songs effortlessly sung but put together with a jeweller's eye for detail", and stated that the musicians "combine to etch out a shifting, soulful surface, an exotic ice-water backdrop for Grace's vocal veneer", noting that "the only times Grace seems ill-at-ease are as she swops Trenchtown patois with, presumably, the sharp-lipped Sly and then tries to rock out on Sting's 'Demolition Man'". Roz Reines of Melody Maker called it "an album with something for everyone: reggae, electronics, disco, blues – even a snatch of salsa funk. The incredible thing is that it all gels together so well – the common denominator is the danceability, which lasts all the way through: changes in tempo and pace only help to sustain the energy level." Deanne Pearson of Smash Hits said that Jones' voice has "neither range nor power", but "the arrangements and production almost make up for this." Record Mirror critic Simon Ludgate found that Jones transcends her vocal limitations through "her character and sense of the surreal". Billboard magazine commented that Jones "fuses her unique personality with a sultry reggae beat", with the songs "Walking in the Rain", "Pull Up to the Bumper", "Use Me" and "I've Done It Again" named as the "best cuts" from the album.

Andy Kellman of AllMusic praised the album in a retrospective review, stating: "Sly & Robbie provide ideal backdrops for Jones yet again, casting a brisk but not bristly sheen over buoyant structures. Never before and never since has a precisely chipped block of ore been so seductive." Mark Coleman wrote in The Rolling Stone Album Guide that Sly and Robbie's introduction of new wave rock to Jones and the "throbbing polyrhythmic" covers of rock songs suited her better than the Edith Piaf-meets-Barry White routines" of her records. Robert Christgau was less enthusiastic. He was unmoved by Jones' own songs and said while the covers on Warm Leatherette were superior to the originals simply because of her "weird force of personality", she could not match "Use Me" and the title track.

=== 2014 remastered edition ===
Nightclubbing continued to gather favorable reviews with the release of the deluxe edition in 2014. Andy Beta from Pitchfork labeled the album's reissue as "Best New Reissue", describing the album as "the record that further cemented her iconic status in pop culture". He also stated: "She treats each cover not as a singer tackling a song, but as an actor inhabiting the skin of a role". Mojo called it "probably the greatest of Grace Jones' Compass Point trio". Uncut's Piers Martin called Nightclubbing "the album that came to define Jones as the complete performer, in her own way, as singer, muse, actress, alien and androgyne. Its sound, a sublime mix of reggae, funk, new wave and disco, was as arresting as its cover image... No one had seen or heard anything quite like this". In Record Collector Kris Needs said that "Nightclubbing still sounds like nothing else released during the 80s, though its colossal influence repeatedly reveals itself". John Harris of Q wrote that "the music on Nightclubbing is as stripped-down and full of space as Jones's froideur demanded. Then again, when it evokes more emotional qualities, it also triumphs."

== Legacy ==
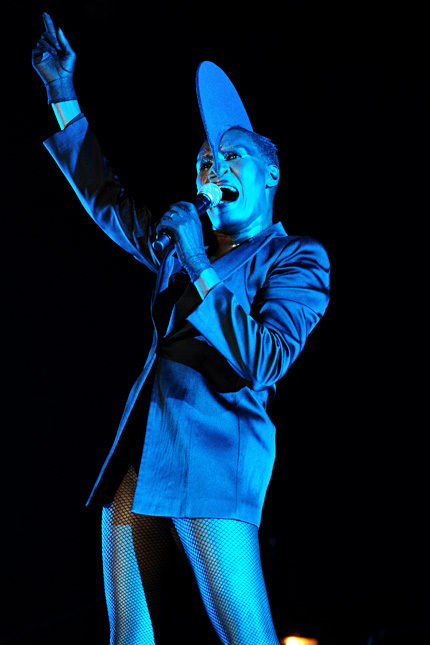
Jones performing at the West Coast Blues & Roots Festival, 2011.

Nightclubbing's distinctive amalgamation of rock, funk, post-punk, pop and reggae set Jones apart from other musical acts of the 1980s. It is considered one of the early convergences of "fashion, art, and music". According to Pitchfork's Andy Beta, it "altered the face of modern pop". He further argued that the album's musical and visual influence is easily palpable in the musical landscape of the 21st century, specially among female musicians such as Lady Gaga, Rihanna, Nicki Minaj, M.I.A., Grimes and FKA Twigs, among others. Other acts influenced by the record include Róisín Murphy, Janelle Monáe, Azealia Banks and Adam Lambert. Beyond pop music, the template set by Jones and her Compass Point backing band was also influential to alternative music, including Massive Attack, Todd Terje, Gorillaz, Hot Chip, and LCD Soundsystem – who "emulate those rubbery yet taut grooves of Sly & Robbie and cohorts". In Q, John Harris wrote: "The fact that this music was first released 33 years ago beggars belief: it showcases great minds alighting on the future, and points the way to Madonna, Björk, Lady Gaga, Gorillaz, M.I.A. and more." According to Molly Beauchemin, Jones "pioneered the way for Shamir, Stromae, and countless other dance mavericks of today – not just with her bewitching candor but through her use of androgynous innuendo". Polari Magazine considered Nightclubbing to be "a defining moment in the history of pop music".

The album further cemented Jones' pop icon status. According to Erich Kessel, "[the singer's] performances were a source of rich critiques on race, gender, and blackness." Her pioneering androgynous aesthetic – conceived alongside Jean-Paul Goude – had a strong impact on the pop culture of the 1980s; for example, it was a precursor to Annie Lennox's persona. According to Abigail Gardner, "Jones was an androgynous audiovisual experience, one who sat comfortably within the context of early 1980s pop, where image had become even more central to pop performance through the emergence of MTV." She further argued that the singer "problematises ideas of black feminine in performance art that contributed to a reconceptualisation of Afrocentric culture and identity." Miriam Kershaw positioned Jones "not as a singer or a diva, but as a piece of art", and argued that she "worked to destabilise racist and sexist clichés as she charted a dynamic course through the history of the Black diaspora, to celebrate its vibrant contemporary form." The singer's gender-bending and unrestrained sexuality also won the acclaim of the gay community, being included in Out's "The 100 Greatest, Gayest Albums of All Time" and Attitude's "Top 50 Gay Albums of All Time". i-D writes: "Jones transcended definition in almost every realm of her life. She is often referred to as a queer icon. [...] She rejects all labels of sexuality, and her musical output is similarly fluid, switching from pop and disco to dub and reggae without hesitation."

In The Village Voice's Pazz & Jop critics' poll of 1981, Nightclubbing placed at number 31, while "Pull Up to the Bumper" was voted the year's 11th best single. It also appeared in the year-end lists of Sounds, Rockerilla, OOR, The Face, Melody Maker and NME – the latter considering it the best album of 1981. Slant Magazine listed Nightclubbing as the 40th best album of the 1980s, with Henderson writing it "performs double duty, building up the singer's legend even as it makes attempts at deconstructing it." NME included the album in its list of The 500 Greatest Albums of All Time, with its entry stating: "A glimpse into the sordid disco depravities behind the velvet rope at Studio 54, Nightclubbing and its standout smash "Pull Up to the Bumper" shunted new wave, reggae and disco firmly into the seductive neon '80s with a single arse/car metaphor." The Guardian listed Nightclubbing as one of the "1000 albums to hear before you die".

=== Accolades ===
Publication	Country	Accolade	Year	Rank
Studio Brussels	Belgium	The 500 Greatest Albums of All Time, Nominations	2015	*
Christophe Brault	France	Top 20 Albums by Year 1964–2004	2006	9
Gilles Verlant	France	300+ Best Albums in the History of Rock	2013	*
Rock & Folk	France	The 250 Best Albums from 1966 to 1991	1991	*
Laut	Germany	Milestones	—	*
Musik Express/Sounds	Germany	The 50 Best Albums from the 80s	2003	24
RoRoRo Rock-Lexicon	Germany	Most Recommended Albums	2003	*
Tempo	Germany	The 100 Best Albums from the 80's	1989	17
Giannis Petridis	Greece	2004 of the Best Albums of the Century	2003	*
Hot Press	Ireland	The 100 Best Albums of All Time	1989	59
Rockerilla	Italy	Albums of the Year	1981	13
OOR	Netherlands	Albums of the Year	1981	12
Adresseavisen	Norway	The 100 (+23) Best Albums of All Time	1995	87
Eggen & Kartvedt	Norway	The Guide to the 100 Important Rock Albums	1999	*
Panorama	Norway	The 30 Best Albums of the Year 1970–98	1999	15
Attitude	United Kingdom	Top 50 Gay Albums of All Time	—	14
The Face	United Kingdom	Albums of the Year	1981	*
GQ	United Kingdom	The 100 Coolest Albums in the World Right Now!	2005	7
The Guardian	United Kingdom	1000 Albums to Hear Before You Die	2007	*
Melody Maker	United Kingdom	Albums of the Year	1981	9
Mojo	United Kingdom	The 80 Greatest Albums from the 80s	2007	*
Gary Mulholland	United Kingdom	261 Greatest Albums Since Punk and Disco	2006	*
Muzik	United Kingdom	Top 50 Dance Albums of All Time	2002	34
NME	United Kingdom	Albums of the Year	1981	1
NME	United Kingdom	The 500 Greatest Albums of All Time	2013	211
Out	United States	The 100 Greatest, Gayest Albums	2008	91
Slant Magazine	United States	The 100 Best Albums of the 1980s	2012	40
Sounds	United States	Albums of the Year	1981	*
The Village Voice	United States	Pazz & Jop	1981	31
(*) designates lists that are unordered.

== Track listing ==
Side one
No.	Title	Writer(s)	Length
1.	"Walking in the Rain"	Harry Vanda; George Young	4:18
2.	"Pull Up to the Bumper"	Grace Jones; Kookoo Baya; Dana Mano	4:41
3.	"Use Me"	Bill Withers	5:04
4.	"Nightclubbing"	David Bowie; Iggy Pop	5:06

Side two
No.	Title	Writer(s)	Length
5.	"Art Groupie"	Jones; Barry Reynolds	2:39
6.	"I've Seen That Face Before (Libertango)"	Astor Piazzolla; Reynolds; Dennis Wilkey; Nathalie Delon	4:30
7.	"Feel Up"	Jones	4:03
8.	"Demolition Man"	Sting	4:03
9.	"I've Done It Again"	Reynolds; Marianne Faithfull	3:51

2014 deluxe edition bonus disc
No.	Title	Writer(s)	Length
1.	"Demolition Man" (12" version)	Sting	4:58
2.	"Pull Up to the Bumper" (12" version)	Jones; Kookoo Baya; Mano	5:45
3.	"I've Seen That Face Before (Libertango)" (12" version)	Piazzolla; Reynolds; Wilkey; Delon	5:38
4.	"Walking in the Rain" (12" version)	Vanda; Young	7:25
5.	"Pull Up to the Bumper" (remixed version)	Jones; Kookoo Baya; Mano	7:15
6.	"Use Me" (long version)	Withers	6:10
7.	"Pull Up to the Bumper" (US party version)	Jones; Kookoo Baya; Mano	5:00
8.	"Feel Up" (extended version)	Jones	6:15
9.	"Pull Up to the Bumper" (1985 remix)	Jones; Kookoo Baya; Mano	6:24
10.	"Peanut Butter"	Jones; Kookoo Baya; Mano	5:10
11.	"If You Wanna Be My Lover"		6:35
12.	"Me! I Disconnect from You"	Gary Numan	5:33
13.	"Esta Cara Me es Conocida"	Piazzolla; Reynolds; Wilkey; Delon	4:32

Notes

- The two-disc deluxe remastered version states that the writer(s) of "If You Wanna Be My Lover" is unknown.
- Tracks 11 and 12 on the deluxe edition's second disc are previously unreleased.
- Track 10 on disc two is an instrumental version of "Pull Up to the Bumper" performed by the Compass Point All-Stars.
- Track 13 on disc two is a Spanish version of "I've Seen That Face Before (Libertango)".

== Personnel ==
Credits adapted from Nightclubbing's liner notes.

Musicians

- Grace Jones – vocals, backing vocals
- Jess Roden – vocals
- Masai Delon – vocals
- Tyrone Downie – keyboards, vocals
- Wally Badarou – keyboards
- Jack Emblow – accordion
- Monte Browne – rhythm guitar
- Mikey Chung – guitar
- Barry Reynolds – guitar
- Robbie Shakespeare – bass guitar
- Sly Dunbar – drums, syndrums
- Mel Speller – percussion, vocals
- Uziah "Sticky" Thompson – percussion

Production

- Chris Blackwell, Alex Sadkin – production
- Ted Jensen – mastering

== Charts ==
=== Weekly charts ===
Weekly chart performance for Nightclubbing
Chart (1981)	Peak position
Australian Albums (Kent Music Report)	19
Dutch Albums (Album Top 100)	2
French Albums (SNEP)	5
German Albums (Offizielle Top 100)	8
New Zealand Albums (RMNZ)	3
Norwegian Albums (VG-lista)	19
Spanish Albums (AFYVE)	20
Swedish Albums (Sverigetopplistan)	4
UK Albums (Official Charts)	35
US Billboard 200	32
US Top R&B/Hip-Hop Albums (Billboard)	9

Chart (2026)	Peak position
Greek Albums (IFPI)	33

Weekly chart performance for Nightclubbing (2014 deluxe edition)
Chart (2014)	Peak position
Belgian Albums (Ultratop Flanders)	66
Belgian Albums (Ultratop Wallonia)	115
Scottish Albums Chart (OCC)	51
UK Albums (Official Charts)	46
UK Downloads Albums Chart (OCC)	51
UK Physical Albums Chart (OCC)	24

=== Year-end charts ===
Year-end chart performance for Nightclubbing
Chart (1981)	Position
Australian Albums (Kent Music Report)	83
Dutch Albums (Album Top 100)	37
German Albums (Offizielle Top 100)	64
New Zealand Albums (RMNZ)	41
Chart (1982)	Position
New Zealand Albums (RMNZ)	27
Chart (1983)	Position
New Zealand Albums (RMNZ)	35

== Certifications and sales ==
Certifications for Nightclubbing
Region	Certification	Certified units/sales
Australia (ARIA)	Platinum	70,000^{^}
Germany (BVMI)	Gold	250,000^{^}
New Zealand (RMNZ)	Platinum	15,000^{^}
United States	—	400,000
^{^} Shipments figures based on certification alone.

== Release history ==
Region	Date	Label	Format(s)	Cat. No.	Ref.
United States	May 1981	Island Records	LP; Cassette	ILPS 9624; M5 9624	
United Kingdom	May 1981	Island Records	LP; Cassette	ILPS 9624; ICT 9624	
Europe	28 April 2014	Island Records	2CD; 2LP; Blu-Ray Audio	0600753480601; 0600753480540; 0600753484463	

== See also ==
- 1980s in music
- List of 1980s albums considered the best
- Music of the United Kingdom (1980s)
- Music of Jamaica
- 1980s in fashion
- Media studies
- Reggae fusion
- Gay icon

== Bibliography ==
- Gardner, Abigail (4 October 2012). "Framing Grace: Shock and Awe at the Ageless Black Body". 'Rock On': Women, Ageing and Popular Music. Routledge. ISBN 978-1409428411.
