= Jones the Rhythm =

Single by Grace Jones

from the album Slave to the Rhythm
- B-side: "Junkyard"; "Slave to the Rhythm"; "The Frog and the Princess"
- Released: December 1985
- Genre: Funk; go-go
- Length: 6:26 (full album version); 4:00 (single edit)
- Label: Island; Manhattan
- Songwriter(s): Bruce Woolley; Simon Darlow; Stephen Lipson; Trevor Horn
- Producer(s): Trevor Horn

Grace Jones singles chronology
"Slave to the Rhythm" (1985)	"Jones the Rhythm" (1985)	"I'm Not Perfect (But I'm Perfect for You)" (1986)

"Jones the Rhythm" is the second single from Grace Jones' album Slave to the Rhythm, which was released in 1985.

== Background ==
"Jones the Rhythm" was the opening track on the album and was one of the eight variations on the "Slave to the Rhythm" theme, this one more rock-influenced and dramatic than the hit single version, featuring the Ambrosian Singers and symphonic orchestration, effectively serving as the overture to the audio-biography. The song includes a spoken introduction by Ian McShane, reciting a passage from Jean-Paul Goude's biography Jungle Fever, which was in parts used for the "Slave to the Rhythm" music video.

The song was released as the second and the last single from the Slave to the Rhythm album and was edited from its original form, exceeding 6 minutes, to a 4-minute track. The B-side on most of 7" releases was the non-album track "Junkyard", another interpretation of the same song, mainly instrumental. A remix of "Jones the Rhythm" had—in the spirit of ZTT Records—been used for one of the B-sides of the previous single "Slave to the Rhythm", on certain editions it was instead named "G.I. Blues".

"Jones the Rhythm" was not a charting success, having been somewhat overshadowed by the huge success of the lead single, and partially due to lack of promotion.

== Track listing ==
- 7" single

A. "Jones the Rhythm" – 4:00
B. "Junkyard" – 5:20

- 7" UK single

A. "Jones the Rhythm" – 4:06
B. "Slave to the Rhythm" – 4:20

- 12" single

A. "Jones the Rhythm" (long version) - 5:30
B1. "The Frog and the Princess" (LP version)
B2. "Jones the Rhythm" - 4:00

- 12" UK single

A. "Jones the Rhythm" – 6:09
B1. "Slave to the Rhythm" – 8:22
B2. "Annihilated Rhythm" – 3:34

- 12" US promotional single

A. "Jones the Rhythm" (long version) – 5:30
B. "Jones the Rhythm" (edited version) – 3:58
