= Living My Life (song) =

Single by Grace Jones
- Released: 1983
- Recorded: 1982
- Genre: Pop; R&B
- Length: 7:34
- Label: Island
- Songwriter: Grace Jones
- Producers: Chris Blackwell; Alex Sadkin

Grace Jones singles chronology
"Cry Now, Laugh Later" (1983)	"Living My Life" (1983)	"Slave to the Rhythm" (1985)

Music video
- "Living My Life" on YouTube

"Living My Life" is a Grace Jones song released as a single in 1983 by Island Records. It was written by Jones with production handled by both Chris Blackwell and Alex Sadkin.

== Background ==
The track was originally recorded for the album of the same name. It did not make the final cut as its overall pop and R&B sound differed from the album's reggae direction. It received a scarce 1983 release as a UK white label single and was officially released only in Portugal. However, Jones performed the track on several TV shows and a remixed version was released as the B-side to the UK reissue single of "Love Is the Drug" in 1986. The original and dub versions are yet to be reissued on CD.

== Music video ==
The music video for the song was directed by Jean-Paul Goude and famously includes the "suicide" scene, with Grace blowing her brains out. Excerpts from the "Living My Life" video were used in the "Slave to the Rhythm" clip. The music video for "Living My Life" was also included in Jones' concert film, A One Man Show.

== Track listing ==
- 12" single (1983)

A. "Living My Life" – 7:34
B. "Living My Life" (Dub) – 4:15

- 12" promotional single (1983)

A. "Living My Life" – 7:34
B. "Living My Life" – 7:34
