= Warm Leatherette (album) =

- Original artwork

Studio album by Grace Jones
- Released: 9 May 1980
- Recorded: 1979–1980
- Studios: Compass Point (Nassau, Bahamas)
- Genres: Pop; reggae; post-punk; funk; new wave; R&B
- Length: 39:04 (LP version); 46:40 (CD and cassette version)
- Label: Island
- Producers: Chris Blackwell; Alex Sadkin

Grace Jones chronology
| Muse (1979) | Warm Leatherette (1980) | Nightclubbing (1981) |

1984 re-release artwork

Singles from Warm Leatherette
- 1. "A Rolling Stone" Released: April 1980; 2. "Love Is the Drug" Released: May 1980; 3. "Private Life" Released: 27 June 1980; 4. "Warm Leatherette" Released: July 1980; 5. "Pars" Released: September 1980; 6. "The Hunter Gets Captured by the Game" Released: September 1980; 7. "Breakdown" Released: October 1980

Warm Leatherette is the fourth studio album by Jamaican singer Grace Jones, released on 9 May 1980 by Island Records. The album features contributions from the reggae production duo Sly and Robbie and is a departure from Jones's earlier disco sound, moving towards a new wave-reggae direction.

== Background and production ==
Although having established herself as a performer with a string of club hits in the US and a large gay following, Jones had only achieved very modest commercial success with her first three disco albums. For Warm Leatherette, Jones went through a musical and visual reinvention. The singer teamed up with producers Chris Blackwell and Alex Sadkin, and Sly and Robbie, Wally Badarou, Barry Reynolds, Mikey Chung and Uziah "Sticky" Thompson, aka the Compass Point Allstars, for a record that would be a total departure from disco and an exploration of new wave music, blending reggae and rock.

In her 2015 memoir, Grace looked back at this time period as one of reinvention. She commented "Disco was squeezing me into a room that was looking tackier and tackier, and I was worried I was going to be trapped. Meeting Jean-Paul and Chris Blackwell helped me follow my own route". Grace felt that her first three albums produced by Tom Moulton – Portfolio (1977), Fame (1978) and Muse (1979) – were "becoming his vision more than mine" and "all followed the same formula". She described the songs from her previous albums as "souvenirs of the Studio 54 era".

Warm Leatherette was the first of three albums recorded at the Compass Point Studios in the Bahamas. According to John Doran of BBC Music, Warm Leatherette is a "post-punk pop" album that, "delved into the worlds of disco, reggae and funk much more successfully than most of her 'alternative' contemporaries, while still retaining a blank-eyed alienation that was more reminiscent of David Bowie or Ian Curtis than most of her peers." David Bowie influences were also noted by Joe Muggs of Fact.

The album includes covers of songs by The Normal, The Pretenders, Roxy Music, Smokey Robinson, Tom Petty and the Heartbreakers and Jacques Higelin. Blackwell intended to make a record with "a harsh sound that was heavy with Jamaican rhythm". For Jones's version of "Breakdown", Tom Petty specially wrote a third verse for the song. The album also includes one song co-written by Jones, "A Rolling Stone", and one French track, "Pars" (French for "Leave"), a reggae re-imagining of Jacques Higelin's song. "Bullshit" is an original by Barry Reynolds. Reynolds would later write or co-write several tracks for Jones: "Art Groupie", "I've Seen That Face Before (Libertango)", the entire B-side of the Living My Life album, and "Well Well Well". "Pull Up to the Bumper" was also recorded during the sessions for Warm Leatherette, but its R&B sound was found not fitting in the rest of the material and so it appeared on Jones's next album, Nightclubbing in 1981.

The vinyl LP release of the album included shorter versions of some of the songs, due to limited capacity of the vinyl format. Most compact disc editions included extended 12" mixes of selected tracks that had originally appeared on the single-sided chrome audio cassette.

== Artwork ==
Warm Leatherette was the first Jones album with cover art designed by her then-boyfriend, Jean-Paul Goude, which presented the singer's androgynous look for the first time. It featured a black and white photograph of Jones pregnant, with her signature flattop haircut, sitting with her arms crossed. Chris Blackwell praised it as "a very powerful image".

After the commercial success of Nightclubbing, Island Records re-released the Warm Leatherette album with new artwork, replacing Jean-Paul Goude's original cover with a picture of Jones performing "Walking in the Rain", taken from her 1982 concert video A One Man Show. The image featured on the back cover was a snapshot of Jones singing "Warm Leatherette", also from A One Man Show. Some subsequent CD releases would adopt the new artwork with the original studio portrait included in the inner sleeve.

== Singles ==
Three singles received a wider, international release: "Love Is the Drug", "Private Life" and "The Hunter Gets Captured by the Game". Notable is that the first two were not released in North America, although they are considered two of Jones's signature songs.

"A Rolling Stone" was released as the lead single in the UK, but did not garner much attention. "Love Is the Drug" quickly followed, but did not make any chart impact - until six years later, when a remixed version became a minor hit in the UK, peaking at No. 35. The most successful single off the album, and Grace Jones's breakthrough song, was "Private Life", which entered the top 20 of singles chart in the UK, becoming her first chart entry in that country, and has since become one of her signature songs. "The Hunter Gets Captured by the Game" was released as the fourth single.

For the North American market "The Hunter Gets Captured by the Game" was chosen as the first single. It failed to enter mainstream charts, but made it to the R&B chart in the US. "Warm Leatherette" reached the top 20 on the dance chart, on the strength of being the lead track on a 12" album promo sampler. "Breakdown" was released as a single only in the US. "Pars", sung in French, was a single in Canada and France.

== Critical reception ==
Professional ratings
Review scores
| Source | Rating |
|---|---|
| AllMusic | 4.5/5 stars |
| Robert Christgau | B+ |
| The Encyclopedia of Popular Music | 3/5 stars |
| Pitchfork | 8.5/10 |
| Record Collector | 4/5 stars |
| Smash Hits | 3/10 |
| Uncut | 8/10 |

AllMusic critic Ron Wynn wrote that "the overall album had more energy and production gloss than previous LPs that had been aimed completely at the club market." Music critic Robert Christgau thought that "with Smokey Robinson and Chrissie Hynde scripting adventures in dominance and fellow Jamaicans Shakespeare and Dunbar adding cyborgian oomph, the theoretical allure of her persona is finally made flesh."

Billboard noted that "daring disco diva Jones abandons her Studio 54 styled gladrags for the punk/reggae scene" but also stated that "unfortunately, Jones has chosen to rework songs [...] instead of emphasizing her more original work which is more satisfying". The song "Bullshit" was chosen by the magazine as the album's best track, but was "unplayable on radio because of its offensive title and lyrics" though "would work well in a disco setting". "Pars" and "The Hunter Gets Captured by the Game" was also selected as highlights from the album.

== Commercial performance ==
Warm Leatherette charted only in Australia, the UK and the US. Although it remains one of the least successful Grace Jones albums in terms of sales and chart performance, it holds the credit for being her breakthrough record in the UK. It is also one of the highest-rated of all her studio releases.

== Track listing ==
=== Original LP release ===
Side One
| No. | Title | Writer(s) | Length |
|---|---|---|---|
| 1. | "Warm Leatherette" | Daniel Miller | 4:25 |
| 2. | "Private Life" | Chrissie Hynde | 5:10 |
| 3. | "A Rolling Stone" | Deniece Williams; Fritz Baskett; Grace Jones | 3:30 |
| 4. | "Love Is the Drug" | Bryan Ferry; Andy Mackay | 7:15 |

Side Two
| No. | Title | Writer(s) | Length |
|---|---|---|---|
| 5. | "The Hunter Gets Captured by the Game" | Smokey Robinson | 3:50 |
| 6. | "Bullshit" | Barry Reynolds | 5:20 |
| 7. | "Breakdown" | Tom Petty | 5:30 |
| 8. | "Pars" | Jacques Higelin | 4:05 |

=== Cassette and CD releases ===
The original cassette release included extended versions of all songs on the album except "A Rolling Stone", "Bullshit" and "Breakdown". When the album was released on Compact disc, it used the extended version of the album.

CD and cassette releases
| No. | Title | Writer(s) | Length |
|---|---|---|---|
| 1. | "Warm Leatherette" | Miller | 5:39 |
| 2. | "Private Life" | Hynde | 6:19 |
| 3. | "A Rolling Stone" | Williams; Baskett; Jones | 3:30 |
| 4. | "Love Is the Drug" | Ferry; Mackay | 8:41 |
| 5. | "The Hunter Gets Captured by the Game" | Robinson | 6:45 |
| 6. | "Bullshit" | Reynolds | 5:20 |
| 7. | "Breakdown" | Petty | 5:30 |
| 8. | "Pars" | Higelin | 4:44 |

=== 2016 deluxe edition ===
Warm Leatherette was released as a deluxe box set on 17 June 2016. It was available on 2CD, 2LP and Blu-Ray audio formats with a range of bonus tracks and previously unreleased material. The Blu-Ray audio release included five additional bonus tracks.

The deluxe edition was the first time that the original short LP version was made available on Compact disc. The B-side "She's Lost Control" was also included on this release.

Disc One (CD) – Original LP version followed by six bonus tracks
| No. | Title | Original release | Length |
|---|---|---|---|
| 9. | "Warm Leatherette" (Long Version) | Warm Leatherette Cassette and CD pressings and "The Hunter Gets Captured by the Game" 12-inch single (12WIP 6645) | 5:35 |
| 10. | "Private Life" (Long Version) | Warm Leatherette Cassette and CD pressings and "Private Life" 12-inch single (12WIP 6629) | 6:17 |
| 11. | "A Rolling Stone" (Long Version) | "A Rolling Stone" 12-inch single (12WIP 6591) | 5:43 |
| 12. | "Love Is the Drug" (Long Version) | Warm Leatherette Cassette and CD pressings and "Love is the Drug" 12-inch single (600 198-213) | 8:38 |
| 13. | "The Hunter Gets Captured by the Game" (Long Version) | Warm Leatherette Cassette and CD pressings and "The Hunter Gets Captured by the Game" 12-inch single (12WIP 6645) | 6:44 |
| 14. | "Pars" (Long Version) | Private Life: The Compass Point Sessions | 5:41 |

Disc Two (CD)
| No. | Title | Original release | Length |
|---|---|---|---|
| 1. | "Private Life" (Long Version 2) | Previously Unreleased | 7:55 |
| 2. | "Private Life" (Dub Version) | Private Life: The Compass Point Sessions | 8:04 |
| 3. | "She's Lost Control" (Long Version) | "Private Life" 12-inch single (12WIP 6629) | 8:23 |
| 4. | "She's Lost Control" (Dub Version) | Private Life: The Compass Point Sessions | 8:38 |
| 5. | "Love Is the Drug" (Single Version) | "Love is the Drug" 7-inch single (101 819) | 4:41 |
| 6. | "Private Life" (Single Version) | "Private Life" 7-inch single (WIP 6629) | 4:37 |
| 7. | "She's Lost Control" (Single Version) | "Private Life" 7-inch single (WIP 6629) | 3:46 |
| 8. | "The Hunter Gets Captured by the Game" (Special Single Version) | "The Hunter Gets Captured by the Game" 7-inch single (WIP 6645) | 3:21 |
| 9. | "Breakdown" (US Single Edit) | "Breakdown" U.S. 7-inch single (IS49603) | 3:00 |
| 10. | "Pars" (Single Version) | Previously Unreleased | 4:24 |
| 11. | "Pars" (Dub Version) | Previously Unreleased | 4:41 |
| 12. | "Love Is the Drug" (12" Single Remix) | "Love is the Drug" 12-inch single (1986 re-release) (12 IS 266) | 7:23 |
| 13. | "Private Life" (12" Single Remix) | "Private Life" 12-inch single (1986 re-release) (12 IS 273) | 7:04 |

Blu-ray audio bonus tracks
| No. | Title | Original release | Length |
|---|---|---|---|
| 14. | "She's Lost Control" (Long Version 2) | Previously Unreleased | 6:45 |
| 15. | "She's Lost Control" (Long Version 3) | "Private Life" 12-inch single (1986 re-release) (12 IS 273) | 5:45 |
| 16. | "Love Is the Drug" (7" Single Remix) | "Love is the Drug" 7-inch single (1986 re-release) (IS 266) | 3:21 |
| 17. | "Private Life" (7" Single Remix) | "Private Life" 7-inch single (1986 re-release) (IS 273) | 4:04 |
| 18. | "Warm Leatherette" (François Kevorkian Remix) | Previously unreleased | 6:23 |

== Personnel ==
- Grace Jones – vocals, background vocals
- Barry Reynolds – guitar
- Mikey Chung – guitar
- Wally Badarou – keyboards
- Robbie Shakespeare – bass guitar
- Sly Dunbar – drums
- Uziah "Sticky" Thompson – percussion

Technical

- Chris Blackwell – production, engineering, mixing
- Alex Sadkin – production, engineering, mixing
- Ted Jensen – mastering engineer
- Kendal Stubbs – assistant engineering
- Jean-Paul Goude – artwork

== Charts ==
Chart performance for Warm Leatherette
| Chart (1980) | Peak position |
|---|---|
| Australian Albums (Kent Music Report) | 47 |
| UK Albums (Official Charts) | 45 |
| US Billboard 200 | 132 |
| US Dance Club Songs (Billboard) All LP cuts | 20 |

Chart performance for Warm Leatherette (2016 deluxe edition)
| Chart (2016) | Peak position |
|---|---|
| Belgian Albums (Ultratop Flanders) | 96 |
| Belgian Albums (Ultratop Wallonia) | 188 |
| Dutch Albums (Album Top 100) | 198 |

== Release history ==
Release dates and formats for Warm Leatherette
| Region | Date | Label(s) | Format(s) | Cat. No. | Ref. |
|---|---|---|---|---|---|
| United Kingdom | May 1980 | Island Records | LP; Cassette | ILPS 9592; ZCI 9592 | |
| United States | June 1980 | Island Records | LP; Cassette; 8-track | ILPS 9592; ISL M5 9592; YSL M8 9592 | |
| Europe & United States | 17 June 2016 | Island Records | 2×CD; 4×LP; Blu-Ray Audio | 0600753660713; 0600753660775; 0600753671283 | |
