= The Apple Stretching =

Single by Grace Jones

from the album Living My Life
- B-side: "Nipple to the Bottle"
- Released: October 1982
- Recorded: June 1982
- Studio: Compass Point Studios (Nassau, Bahamas)
- Genre: Reggae
- Length: 3:33
- Label: Island
- Songwriter: Melvin Van Peebles
- Producers: Alex Sadkin; Chris Blackwell

Grace Jones singles chronology
"Nipple to the Bottle" (1982)	"The Apple Stretching" (1982)	"My Jamaican Guy" (1983)

"The Apple Stretching" is a song by Jamaican singer and songwriter Grace Jones, released as a single in 1982.

== Background ==
"The Apple Stretching" was written by Melvin Van Peebles for his 1982 play Waltz of the Stork. The song describes New York City in the early morning. It was included on Jones' sixth album Living My Life and also released as a double A-side single with "Nipple to the Bottle", written by Jones and Sly Dunbar (which also got a separate single release in certain territories). The original 7-minute song's single edit was just the album version, faded out at 3:33. "The Apple Stretching" was simultaneously released as a 12" version, clocking in at 8:40. It included a second verse of the song, which had been omitted on the album version, where Jones sings together with a bass guitar only along with funky percussion. This version remains unreleased on CD.

Van Peebles said of being able to do the song, "I couldn't have done [that track before], because people weren't used to [paying attention to] music and words simultaneously." He performed the song on his own album, Ghetto Gothic in 1995.

== Track listing ==
- U.K. 7" single – WIP 6779
- Germany 7" single – 104 706-100
- Italy 7" single – WIP 26779
- Japan 7" single – 7S-72

A. "The Apple Stretching" (Single version) – 3:27
B. "Nipple to the Bottle" (Single version) – 4:22

- U.K. 12" single – 12 WIP 6779
- Germany 12" single – 600 687-213
- Italy 12" single – WIPX 866

A. "The Apple Stretching" (Long version) – 8:40
B. "Nipple to the Bottle" (Long version) – 6:59

== Chart performance ==
Chart (1982)	Peak position
UK Singles (OCC)	50
