= The Hunter Gets Captured by the Game =

1966 song by Smokey Robinson

Single by The Marvelettes

from the album The Marvelettes
- B-side: "I Think I Can Change You"
- Released: December 27, 1966
- Recorded: 1966
- Studio: Hitsville U.S.A.
- Genre: Soul, pop
- Length: 2:45 (single version); 3:13 (album version)
- Label: Tamla
- Songwriter: Smokey Robinson
- Producer: Smokey Robinson

The Marvelettes singles chronology
| "You're the One" (1966) | "The Hunter Gets Captured by the Game" (1966) | "When You're Young and in Love" (1967) |

"The Hunter Gets Captured by the Game" is a 1966 song written by Smokey Robinson. It was a hit single in 1967 for the American girl group The Marvelettes for the Motown label, from their self-titled album released that same year.

== The Marvelettes version ==
=== Background ===
The Marvelettes single peaked in the United States in spring 1967 at number 13 on the Billboard Hot 100 pop singles chart and at number two on the Billboard soul chart. The group's version of the song was produced by Smokey Robinson. The song is written in the first person, from the point of view of someone who has "laid such a tender trap" to catch a lover. Lead singer Wanda Young-Rogers (wife of Miracles member Bobby Rogers) talks about how she had been stalking her lover, having to learn his "ways and habits" so she could plan how to catch him. But "certain things rearrange" and she finds herself caught, presumably, in love with her 'game.'

There seems to be 3 variations issued. The original mono single ended cold, yet some (not all) of the stereo remixes fade at the end. There is also a different last verse on some of the reissues, leading to the assumption that Smokey recorded the song much longer than any of the issued versions. Additionally, the single version and at least one of the stereo mixes exclude the first part of the second verse.

Billboard named the song #71 on their list of 100 Greatest Girl Group Songs of All Time.

=== Personnel ===
- Lead vocals by Wanda Young-Rogers
- Background vocals by Gladys Horton, Katherine Anderson and The Andantes: Jackie Hicks, Marlene Barrow, and Louvain Demps
- Instrumentation by The Funk Brothers

=== Chart performance ===
| Chart (1967) | Peak position |
|---|---|
| Billboard Hot 100 | 13 |
| R&B Singles | 2 |

== Grace Jones version ==
"The Hunter Gets Captured by the Game"

Single by Grace Jones

from the album Warm Leatherette
- B-side: "Sinning", "Warm Leatherette"
- Released: September 1980
- Genre: Post-disco; dance
- Length: 3:50
- Label: Island
- Songwriter: Smokey Robinson
- Producers: Chris Blackwell; Alex Sadkin

Grace Jones singles chronology
| "Private Life" (1980) | "The Hunter Gets Captured by the Game" (1980) | "Breakdown" (1980) |

=== Background ===
In 1980, Jamaican singer Grace Jones remade the song and had minor success with her version in the US. It was included on Warm Leatherette in 1980, her first post-disco album. It was also released as the lead single in the USA and the fourth in the UK. The B-side on the European single is an alternate version of the song, known as the "Special Single Version". This version was not released on CD until 2016 when Warm Leatherette was reissued.

=== Reception ===
The single was listed by Billboard as one of its recommended pop singles for the week of August 9, 1980.

=== Track listings ===
- US 7" single

A. "The Hunter Gets Captured by the Game" – 3:49
B. "Sinning" – 5:06

- EU 7" single

A. "The Hunter Gets Captured by the Game" (LP version) – 3:50
B. "The Hunter Gets Captured by the Game" (Special Version) – 3:20

- UK 12" single>

A. "The Hunter Gets Captured by the Game" (long version) – 6:43
B. "Warm Leatherette" (long version) – 5:36

=== Chart performance ===
| Chart (1980) | Peak position |
|---|---|
| UK Singles (Record Business) | 97 |
| US Hot R&B/Hip-Hop Songs (Billboard) | 87 |

=== Release history ===
Release dates and formats for "The Hunter Gets Captured by the Game"
| Region | Date | Label(s) | Format(s) | Cat. No. | Ref. |
|---|---|---|---|---|---|
| United States | August 1980 | Island Records | 7-inch | IS 49531 | |
| United Kingdom | September 1980 | Island Records | 7-inch; 12-inch | WIP 6645; 12WIP 6645 | |

== Other cover versions ==
The song has had several cover versions over the years:

- Blondie included a cover as the closing track on their 1982 conceptual album The Hunter.
- Massive Attack and Tracey Thorn (of Everything but the Girl) recorded a cover for the soundtrack to Batman Forever in 1995.
- Bette Midler performed a rendition included in the deluxe edition of her 2014 studio album It's The Girls!.
- Another cover also appeared on Jerry Garcia's Garcia in 1974, and was performed live by the Jerry Garcia Band until into the early 90s.
