= Private Life (song) =

1980 song by the Pretenders

Song by The Pretenders

from the album Pretenders
- Released: January 11, 1980
- Recorded: 1979
- Studio: Wessex Studios; Air Studios
- Genre: Reggae rock; punk rock
- Length: 6:25
- Label: Sire
- Songwriter: Chrissie Hynde
- Producer: Chris Thomas

"Private Life"

Single by Grace Jones

from the album Warm Leatherette
- B-side: "She's Lost Control"; "Pars"
- Released: June 27, 1980
- Genre: Dub; new wave
- Length: 4:37
- Label: Island
- Songwriter: Chrissie Hynde
- Producers: Chris Blackwell; Alex Sadkin

Grace Jones singles chronology
| "Love Is the Drug" (1980) | "Private Life" (1980) | "The Hunter Gets Captured by the Game" (1980) |

Official audio
- "Private Life" on YouTube

Alternative cover
- 1986 Remix

"Private Life" is a 1980 song written by Chrissie Hynde, and released by both the British band the Pretenders and the Jamaican singer Grace Jones in 1980.

== Background ==
The song was written by Chrissie Hynde, the leader and singer of the Pretenders, and included on that band's 1979 debut album Pretenders. Later that year the track was covered by Grace Jones on her fourth album Warm Leatherette, recorded at the Compass Point Studios in the Bahamas with Sly and Robbie contributing, among others. In the liner notes to Island Records' 1998 compilation Private Life: The Compass Point Sessions, Hynde is quoted as saying:

Like all the other London punks, I wanted to do reggae, and I wrote "Private Life". When I first heard Grace's version I thought 'Now that's how it's supposed to sound!' In fact it was one of the high points of my career – what with Sly and Robbie being the masters, and Grace Jones with her scorching delivery. Someone told me it was Chris Blackwell's idea – thanks Chris!

"Private Life" was released as the third single from the Warm Leatherette album. However, it marked a new era in Jones' career as she left her disco persona behind her and adopted an entirely different image, exploring genres like reggae, rock and new wave. It became Grace Jones' first ever chart entry in the UK, peaking at number 17. The single's B-side was a non-album track; "She's Lost Control", originally recorded by Joy Division. Both tracks were remixed and re-edited for the 7" single with the 4:38 version of "Private Life", now available on the Spectrum/Universal Music for Girls Night Out compilation CD.

In the Netherlands the B-side was the French language "Pars" from the Warm Leatherette album. In Germany, "La Vie en rose" from Portfolio (1977) was re-issued as a follow-up single to "Private Life" whereas the UK and the Netherlands opted for "The Hunter Gets Captured by the Game", which had already been the lead single from Warm Leatherette for the American market.

Following the release of the compilation Island Life in 1985, the song was remixed and re-issued as a single in the UK, then with "My Jamaican Guy" as the B-side, and charted again.

== Music video ==
The original video for this song, directed by Mike Mansfield, presented the famous Grace Jones mask for the first time. The entire video shows Jones' face in close-up, with her taking the mask off, replacing it, and then taking it off again, and mostly singing straight to the camera. The clip was filmed in a single take, without any editing.

Another music video for the song was produced, which was included in the program of the 1982 A One Man Show VHS release. It again presented Jones in a close-up, with her face partially covered with shadows, as well as posing in front of a white wall.

== Reception ==
Music Week gave a positive review of the single, calling it an "imaginative re-mould" of Chrissie Hynde's original, with Jones "[injecting] sinister, penetrating analytical feel into lyric".

== Track listing ==
=== Original 1980 release ===
- U.K. 7" single – WIP 6629
- German 7" single – 102 261-100
- French 7" single – 6010 258
- Australian and New Zealand 7" single – K 7995

A. "Private Life" (Single version) – 4:37
B. "She's Lost Control" (Single version) – 3:45

- U.K. 12" single – 12WIP 6629
- German 12" single – 600 261

A. "Private Life" (Long version) – 6:19
B. "She's Lost Control" (Long version) – 8:25

- Dutch 7" single – 102 305

A. "Private Life" (Single version) – 4:37
B. "Pars" (LP version) – 4:05

=== 1986 re-release ===
- U.K. 7" single – IS 273

A. "Private Life" (Paul "Groucho" Smykle Remix) – 3:57
B. "My Jamaican Guy" (Edit) – 4:16

- U.K. 12" single – 12 IS 273

A1. "Private Life" (Paul "Groucho" Smykle Extended Remix) – 7:00
A2. "My Jamaican Guy" (LP version) – 6:00
B1. "Feel Up" (Extended version) – 6:14
B2. "She's Lost Control" (Edit) – 5:45

- U.K. 12" single (Re-Mix Re-Mask) – 12 ISX 273

A. "Re-Mix Re-Mask" (Slave to the Rhythm/My Jamaican Guy/La Vie en Rose/Private Life) – 5:55
B1. "Private Life" (Paul "Groucho" Smykle Extended Remix) – 7:00
B2. "My Jamaican Guy" (LP version) – 6:00

=== 2016 re-release ===
- 12 single (Record Store Day) – 5366569

A1. "Private Life" (Long version) – 6:19
A2. "Private Life" (Dub version) – 8:03
B1. "She's Lost Control" (Long version) – 8:25
B2. "She's Lost Control" (Dub version) – 8:37

== Personnel ==
- Grace Jones – vocals
- Sly Dunbar – drums
- Robbie Shakespeare – bass guitar
- Barry Reynolds – guitar
- Mikey Chung – guitar
- Wally Badarou – keyboards
- Uziah Thompson – percussion

== Chart positions ==
Chart performance for "Private Life"
| Chart (1980) | Peak position |
|---|---|
| Luxembourg (Radio Luxembourg) | 17 |
| UK Singles Chart (OCC) | 17 |

Chart performance for "Private Life" (1986 Remix)
| Chart (1986) | Peak position |
|---|---|
| UK Singles Chart (OCC) | 91 |

Chart performance for "Private Life" (2016 re-release)
| Chart (2016) | Peak position |
|---|---|
| UK Physical Singles Chart (OCC) | 48 |
