= Nightclubbing (song) =

Song by Iggy Pop

from the album The Idiot
- Released: March 18, 1977
- Recorded: 1976–1977
- Genre: Art rock
- Length: 4:14
- Label: RCA
- Songwriters: Iggy Pop; David Bowie
- Producer: David Bowie

"Nightclubbing" is a song written by David Bowie and Iggy Pop, first released by Iggy Pop on his debut solo studio album, The Idiot in 1977. It has been since considered "a career highlight", along with "Lust for Life" and has been covered by many artists. It is also extensively featured on other media.

== Background ==
The song, which was written and recorded in Berlin, features David Bowie on piano with the aid of a Roland drum machine. When Iggy Pop pronounced himself happy with the result, Bowie protested that they needed real drums to finish it off. Pop insisted on keeping the rhythm machine, saying "it kicks ass, it's better than a drummer". Pop largely wrote the lyrics on the spot "in ten minutes", Bowie suggesting that he write about "walking through the night like ghosts". The song's riff has been perceived as a mischievous quote of Gary Glitter's "Rock and Roll".

== Cover versions and use in media ==
The song has been covered by many artists, including Grace Jones, The Jolly Boys, and Bluvertigo. Grace Jones' version achieved mainstream success and was included on her album of the same name. The Human League has a version on their Holiday '80 EP (1980).

Siouxsie Sioux with her band The Creatures covered the song on their 1999 live album Sequins in the Sun.

In 2021, American gothic rock/post-punk band Damien Done released a cover of "Nightclubbing" as a single.

Nine Inch Nails' hit 1994 song, "Closer" from their album The Downward Spiral, features a modified sample of the Roland bass drum from the song. Trent Reznor, Peter Murphy, Atticus Ross and Jeordie White later covered the song during a live radio session.

The drum loop from "Nightclubbing" was used by Oasis in their song "Force of Nature", a track written for the soundtrack of Love, Honor and Obey, and recorded for their 2002 album Heathen Chemistry.

The song was featured in the 1996 film Trainspotting and appeared on its soundtrack, along with another Iggy Pop track, "Lust for Life".

The song also appeared in the HBO series Westworld, as part of the third season, in the episode "Genre".

== Personnel ==
- Iggy Pop – lead vocals
- David Bowie – keyboards, synthesizer, piano, drum machine, backing vocals
- George Murray – bass
- Phil Palmer – guitar
