= Nipple to the Bottle =

Single by Grace Jones

from the album Living My Life
- B-side: "The Apple Stretching"; "Cry Now, Laugh Later"; "JA Guys"
- Released: October 1982
- Recorded: 1982
- Studio: Compass Point Studios (Nassau, Bahamas)
- Genre: Electro-disco; funk
- Length: 5:54
- Label: Island
- Songwriters: Grace Jones; Sly Dunbar
- Producers: Alex Sadkin; Chris Blackwell

Grace Jones singles chronology
"Walking in the Rain" (1981)	"Nipple to the Bottle" (1982)	"The Apple Stretching" (1982)

"Nipple to the Bottle" is a single by the Jamaican singer, model and actress Grace Jones, released in 1982.

== Background ==
"Nipple to the Bottle" was the lead single from Jones' sixth studio album, Living My Life. The song was released in some territories as a double A-side single with "The Apple Stretching". In some countries, the single B-side featured "Cry Now, Laugh Later" or a dub version of "My Jamaican Guy"; all of these three tracks would later receive separate single releases. The front cover uses an image taken from her A One Man Show performance of "Demolition Man", with a group of Grace Jones "look-alikes" marching on across the stage. The song was performed by Grace in Julien Temple's 1983 film It's All True, made for BBC Arena series.

The single met with a considerable success, reaching Top 20 on Billboard R&B and dance charts. It did exceptionally well in New Zealand, where it became a number 3 hit.

== Track listing ==
- Australia and New Zealand 7" single – K-8901
- Netherlands 7" single – 104.706

A. "Nipple to the Bottle" (Single version) – 3:59
B. "The Apple Stretching" (Single version) – 3:27

- Australia and New Zealand 12" single – X-8901
- Netherlands 12" single – 600.687

A. "Nipple to the Bottle" (Long version) – 6:55
B. "The Apple Stretching" (Long version) – 8:40

- U.S. 7" single – 7-99963

A. "Nipple to the Bottle" (Single version) – 3:59
B. "J.A. Guys" (Dub version of "My Jamaican Guy") – 4:40

- U.S. 12" single – 0-99963

A. "Nipple to the Bottle" (Long version) – 6:55
B. "J.A. Guys" (Dub version of "My Jamaican Guy") – 7:15

- Canada 7" single – 79 99637

A. "Nipple to the Bottle" (Single version) – 4:17
B. "Cry Now, Laugh Later" (Single version) – 4:29

- Canada 12" single – 79 99640

A. "Nipple to the Bottle" (Long version) – 6:55
B. "Cry Now, Laugh Later" (Long version) – 6:08

== Chart performance ==
Chart (1982)	Peak position
Australia (Kent Music Report)	33
Belgium (Ultratop 50 Flanders)	7
Netherlands (Dutch Top 40)	7
Netherlands (Single Top 100)	16
New Zealand (Recorded Music NZ)	3
US Bubbling Under Hot 100 (Billboard)	3
US Dance Club Songs (Billboard)	2
US Hot R&B/Hip-Hop Songs (Billboard)	17
