= Slave to the Rhythm (Grace Jones song) =

1985 single by Grace Jones

Single by Grace Jones

from the album Slave to the Rhythm
- Released: October 1985
- Recorded: December 1984
- Genre: R&B
- Length: 4:20 (7" radio edit); 6:35 (album version); 8:26 (12" (Hot) Blooded version)
- Label: Island; Manhattan
- Songwriters: Bruce Woolley; Simon Darlow; Stephen Lipson; Trevor Horn
- Producer: Trevor Horn

Grace Jones singles chronology
"Living My Life" (1983)	"Slave to the Rhythm" (1985)	"Jones the Rhythm" (1985)

Official audio
- "Slave to the Rhythm" on YouTube

"Slave to the Rhythm" is a song by the Jamaican singer, model and actress Grace Jones. It was released in October 1985 on Jones' seventh album, Slave to the Rhythm (1985), on which it is titled "Ladies and Gentlemen: Miss Grace Jones". It was produced by Trevor Horn and written by Horn, Bruce Woolley, Stephen Lipson and Simon Darlow. The song reached number 12 on the UK singles chart and number one on the US Billboard Hot Dance Club Play chart. Its music video was directed by Jean-Paul Goude.

== Background ==
"Slave to the Rhythm" was the first single from Grace Jones' album of the same name, which was released in 1985. The song and the album were written by Bruce Woolley, Simon Darlow, Stephen Lipson and Trevor Horn, and was produced by Horn. It was Jones' first album in three years, and it contained eight variations of the same song (the single's B-side is another variation, yet to be released on CD).

"Slave to the Rhythm" was originally intended for Frankie Goes to Hollywood as a follow-up to their hit debut single "Relax". A demo version of the song was recorded by the band. The song was assembled and produced by Horn after "Two Tribes", but the project was ultimately given to Jones. Paul Morley says Horn worked on the song endlessly and had hoped it would become one of his biggest and most successful creations.

== Release ==
"Slave to the Rhythm" was released in autumn 1985. The single became one of Jones' greatest commercial successes and is considered to be one of her signature tunes. It became one of the biggest chart successes for the singer in the UK (number 12, next to "Pull Up to the Bumper"). The track became particularly popular in Belgium, New Zealand, Italy and German speaking countries, where it made it to the top 10. The original version of the single, and its remixes, also topped the American dance chart in February 1986, despite not entering the mainstream Billboard Hot 100 ranking. "Slave to the Rhythm" was proclaimed the best single of 1985 by The Face magazine. In 1994 a newly remixed version of the song reached the top 40 in the UK charts.

The single was titled "Ladies and Gentlemen: Miss Grace Jones" on the Slave to the Rhythm album. The track "Slave to the Rhythm" on the album is in turn a different interpretation of the song—a fact which apparently eluded Universal Music when they included this version in one of their many best-of packages The Ultimate Collection.

In 2012, Jones performed the song at Queen Elizabeth II's Diamond Jubilee Concert, in which she hula-hooped for the entire song.

== Music video ==
The accompanying music video for "Slave to the Rhythm" features the hit single version of the song, billed as "Ladies and Gentlemen: Miss Grace Jones" in the album track listing. It largely consists of previously seen footage, using excerpts from Jones' previously released music videos, "My Jamaican Guy" and "Living My Life", as well as the live concert performance video A One Man Show. Included are also still pictures of some of the singer's most iconic looks and the Citroën CX TV advertisement. No new footage of Jones herself was filmed for the video, which features a spoken voice-over from actor Ian McShane, extracted from tracks "Jones the Rhythm" and "Operattack". The video, of which there are several versions, was directed by Jean-Paul Goude, Jones' boyfriend at the time.

The video was nominated for the Best Female Video at 1986 MTV Video Music Awards, eventually losing to Whitney Houston's "How Will I Know". It was included as a bonus on the re-release of the A One Man Show video.

The video starts with dialogue from Ian McShane (featured on the album as the introduction to "Jones the Rhythm") and shows how the cover art of Slave to the Rhythm was made, a before and after of the cover art image, then it shows a series of clips from archived music videos including "My Jamaican Guy", "I've Seen That Face Before (Libertango)" and the suicide scene from "Living My Life" edited to towards the end to when Jones collapsed and dies.

== Track listing ==
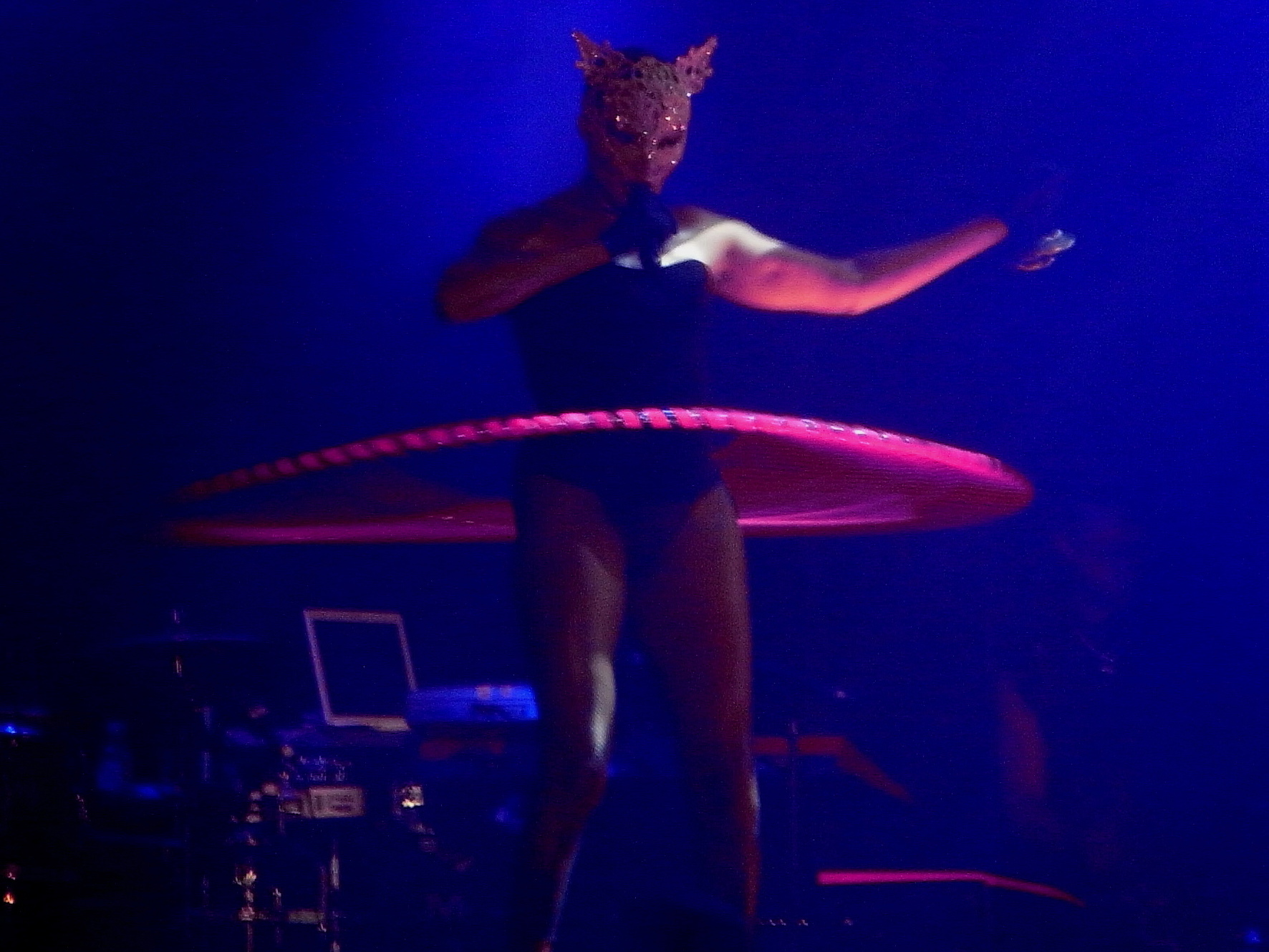
Grace Jones performing "Slave to the Rhythm", with gilded cat mask and hula-hoop, on her Hurricane Tour

- 7" single (1985)

A. "Slave to the Rhythm" – 4:20
B. "G.I. Blues" – 3:37

- 12" single (1985)

A. "Slave to the Rhythm" (Blooded) – 8:26
B1. "Junk Yard" – 5:17
B2. "Annihilated Rhythm" – 3:37

- CD maxi single (1994)
1. "Slave to the Rhythm" – 4:22
2. "Slave to the Rhythm" (Blooded) – 8:26
3. "Slave to the Rhythm" (D Monster Mix) – 9:51
4. "Slave to the Rhythm" (D's Vocal Dub) – 5:24
5. "Slave to the Rhythm" (D Beatsappella) – 5:22
- CD maxi single #2 (1994)
1. "Slave to the Rhythm" – 4:24
2. "Slave to the Rhythm" (The T-Empo Grace In Your Face '94 Overture) - 8:31
3. "Slave to the Rhythm" (Love To Infinity Classic Paradise 12" Mix) - 7:46
4. "Slave to the Rhythm" (Ollie D House Mix) - 5:39
5. "Slave to the Rhythm" (Ollie D Gyro Disney Dub) - 6:25

== Personnel ==
- Grace Jones – lead vocals, interview
- Tessa Niles – background vocals
- Ian McShane – spoken word
- Ambrosian Singers – background vocals, choir
- David Gilmour – guitar samples
- J.J. Belle – rhythm guitar
- Luis Jardim - bass guitar
- Stephen Lipson – lead guitar, keyboards
- Andy Richards, Bruce Woolley – keyboards, background vocals
- William "Ju Ju" House – drums
- The Little Beats, "Shorty" Tim – percussion
- Frank Ricotti – percussion
- John Thirkell – trumpet
- Guy Barker – trumpet
- Pete Beachill – trombone
- Dave Bishop – tenor saxophone
- David Snell – harp
- John McCarthy – conductor, choir, chorus
- Paul Morley, Jean-Paul Goude – interview
- Ronja Andersen – little sister to Grace Jones

== Charts ==
=== Weekly charts ===
Chart (1985–1986)	Peak position
Australia (Kent Music Report)	20
Austria (Ö3 Austria Top 40)	7
Belgium (Ultratop 50 Flanders)	4
Canada Adult Contemporary (RPM)	18
European Top 100 Singles (Eurotipsheet)	7
Finland (Suomen virallinen lista)	16
France (SNEP)	50
Italy (Musica e dischi)	6
Luxembourg (Radio Luxembourg)	8
Netherlands (Dutch Top 40)	3
Netherlands (Single Top 100)	4
New Zealand (Recorded Music NZ)	5
Spain (AFYVE)	14
Switzerland (Schweizer Hitparade)	5
UK Singles (Official Charts)	12
US Dance Club Songs (Billboard)	1
US Hot R&B/Hip-Hop Songs (Billboard)	20
West Germany (GfK)	4

Chart (1994)	Peak position
Australia (ARIA)	93
UK Singles (Official Charts)	28
UK Club Chart (Music Week)	6

=== Year-end charts ===
Chart (1985)	Position
Belgium (Ultratop 50 Flanders)	41
Netherlands (Single Top 100)	42

Chart (1986)	Position
West Germany (Media Control)	42
