= Walking in the Rain (Flash and the Pan song) =

1981 single by Grace Jones

"Walking in the Rain" is a 1976 song by Australian band Flash and the Pan. The song was covered by Grace Jones and released as a single from her album Nightclubbing.

== Background ==
The song was originally composed and recorded by Australian band Flash and the Pan (the songwriting and producing team of ex-Easybeats Harry Vanda and George Young). Originally included as the B-Side of "Hey, St. Peter", it was later included on their eponymous 1979 debut album.

In 1981 it was covered by Grace Jones, who included it on Nightclubbing, her second Compass Point album and later released as the last single from the record. The song was released in various remixes, among them a 7:30 12" mix including additional vocal overdubs, first released on CD in 2014 on the deluxe edition of Nightclubbing. The B-side, "Peanut Butter", credited to the Compass Point All Stars, was actually an instrumental dub version of "Pull Up to the Bumper", which was unavailable on CD until 2014 when her album Nightclubbing was remastered. "Walking in the Rain" was included in Jones' music documentary A One Man Show, and a snapshot from the video was later used as the cover of the 1985 Warm Leatherette reissue.

== Track listing (Grace Jones version) ==
"Walking in the Rain"

Single by Grace Jones

from the album Nightclubbing
- B-side: "Pull Up to the Bumper"
- Released: October 1981
- Studio: Compass Point Studios (Nassau, Bahamas)
- Genre: Post-punk
- Length: 4:20
- Label: Island
- Songwriters: Harry Vanda; George Young
- Producers: Chris Blackwell; Alex Sadkin

Grace Jones singles chronology
"Pull Up to the Bumper" (1981)	"Walking in the Rain" (1981)	"Nipple to the Bottle" (1982)

- 7" single (UK, Australia)

A. "Walking in the Rain" (edited version) – 3:52
B. "Peanut Butter" – 3:07

- 7" single (Germany)

A. "Walking in the Rain" – 4:18
B. "Pull Up to the Bumper" – 4:40

- 12" single (Australia)

A. "Walking in the Rain" (edited version) – 4:58
B1. "Peanut Butter" – 3:07
B2. "Feel Up" (extended version) – 5:06

- 12" single (Germany)

A. "Walking in the Rain" – 7:25
B1. "Pull Up to the Bumper" (remixed version) – 7:15
B2. "Peanut Butter" – 3:05

- 12" single (Canada)

A1. "Walking in the Rain" – 7:25
A2. "Walking in the Rain" – 4:18
B1. "Pull Up to the Bumper" – 7:15
B2. "Feel Up" – 5:13

== Chart performance ==
Chart (1981)	Peak position
Australia (Kent Music Report)	94
New Zealand (Recorded Music NZ)	34
West Germany (GfK)	67
