= My Jamaican Guy =

Single by Grace Jones

from the album Living My Life
- B-side: "Cry Now, Laugh Later"; "Everybody Hold Still" (Japan)
- Released: January 14, 1983
- Recorded: 1982
- Studio: Compass Point Studios (Nassau, Bahamas)
- Genre: Reggae; dub; electro disco
- Label: Island
- Songwriter: Grace Jones
- Producers: Alex Sadkin; Christopher Blackwell

Grace Jones singles chronology
"The Apple Stretching" (1982)	"My Jamaican Guy" (1983)	"Cry Now, Laugh Later" (1983)

Music video
- "My Jamaican Guy" on YouTube

"My Jamaican Guy" is a single by the Jamaican singer and actress Grace Jones, released in 1983.

== Background ==
"My Jamaican Guy" was the third single to Grace Jones' 1982 album Living My Life, her third and last album recorded in the Compass Point Studios in Nassau, Bahamas. The track showcased Caribbean music-inspired reggae/dub sound. Jones penned the song herself, revealing in a 2010 interview that it was written about Tyrone Downie of Bob Marley's The Wailers, who "was with somebody else. He was a beautiful guy. He doesn't even know I wrote it about him." The song is largely written in Jamaican Patois. Jones' mother Marjorie provided backing vocals but, as a pastor's wife, wasn't credited for fear of upsetting church elders.

"Cry Now, Laugh Later", another Living My Life track, was released on the side B, and later got a separate A-side release on American market. In Japan, "Everybody Hold Still" made the B-side. That release featured a unique edit of "My Jamaican Guy", as well as a different cover. The US and the UK 12" versions of the track differed substantially; the US version (7:01) was in fact the unedited and unremixed album master and was later included on the 1998 compilation Private Life: The Compass Point Sessions. The UK 12" credits separately "My Jamaican Guy" and "J. A. Guys (Dub)", but the tracks run together as one; the mix opens with the first four minutes of the Living My Life album version, then cuts to the three last minutes of the dub version "J. A. Guys" - the full length version of which in turn was released as the B-side of the US 12" "Nipple to the Bottle". Both the UK 12" mix of "My Jamaican Guy" and the "J. A. Guys" dub remain unreleased on CD.

The iconic image on the single cover was created by Jean-Paul Goude, who was the singer's partner at that time and worked on some of her record artworks. A version of it was later used as a cover of her final "best of" compilation to date, The Ultimate Collection.

== Music video ==
The music video for "My Jamaican Guy" features Jones performing the song on stage, kissing her own image, and hugging her "Jamaican guy". It also includes some footage from her A One Man Show concert performance and still images of one of her most iconic images. The clip was directed by Jean-Paul Goude and produced by Eddie Babbage. A slightly different, shorter version of the video was included on the A One Man Show VHS release in 1982.

== In popular culture ==
In Japan, "My Jamaican Guy" was featured in the television commercial for the Ezaki Glico chocolate brand Aphros, in which Japanese actress Yūko Tanaka appeared.

== Track listing ==
- U.K. 7" single – IS 103

A. "My Jamaican Guy" (Single version) – 3:36
B. "Cry Now, Laugh Later" (Single version) – 4:25

- Australia and New Zealand 7" single – K 8995

A. "My Jamaican Guy" (Single version) – 3:36
B. "J.A. Guys" (Dub) – 3:48

- Japan 7" single – 7S-83

A. "My Jamaican Guy" (Edit) – 3:14
B. "Everybody Hold Still" – 3:09

- U.K. 12" single – 12 IS 103

A1. "My Jamaican Guy" – 4:05
A2. "J.A. Guys" (Dub) – 3:11
B. "Cry Now, Laugh Later" (Long version) – 5:51

The full-length 7-minute version of "J.A. Guys" was released on the b-side of the U.S. 12-inch single of "Nipple to the Bottle".

== Chart performance ==
Chart (1983)	Peak position
New Zealand (Recorded Music NZ)	39
UK Singles (Official Charts)	56
