= Compass Point Studios =

Recording studio in Nassau, Bahamas

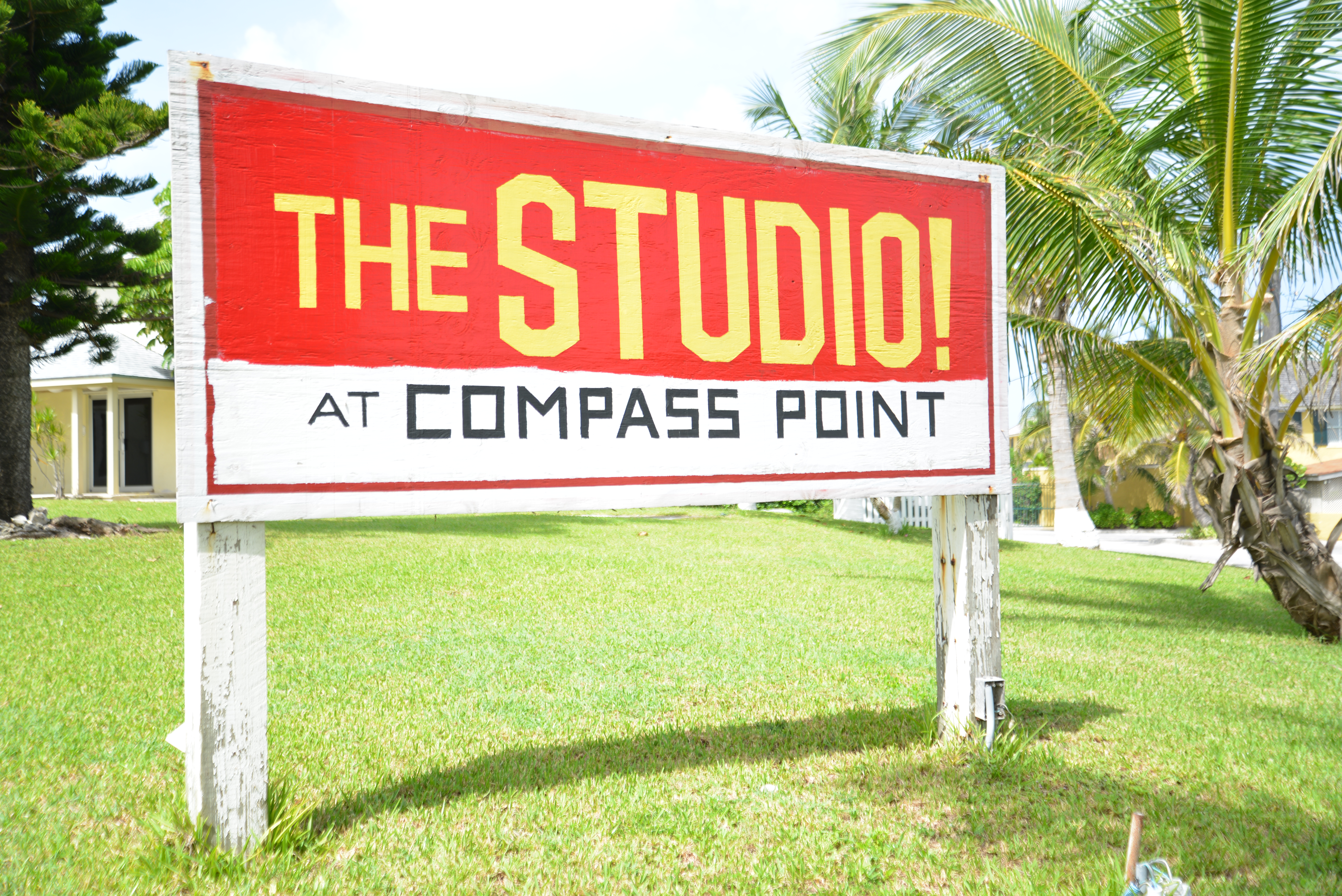
Compass Point Studios

Compass Point Studios was a music recording studio in the Bahamas, established in 1977 by Chris Blackwell, founder and owner of Island Records. The concept of the studio was of a recording facility supported by in-house artists, musicians, producers and audio engineers, all dedicated to a specific and recognisable sound and style. The session band at the studios, as well as visiting recording artists, became known as the Compass Point All Stars.

Located 16 kilometres west of downtown Nassau, on the island of New Providence, the studio attracted musical artists from around the world to record at its facilities during the 1970s and 1980s. AC/DC's Back in Black (1980), one of the best-selling albums of all time, was one of many albums recorded there. The studio closed in September 2010.

== History ==
Compass Point Studios was built in 1977 in Nassau, Bahamas, by Chris Blackwell, founder of Island Records. In 1980, Blackwell assembled a recording band with Jamaican reggae foundations, based around Sly and Robbie, who had been signed to Island Records in the 1970s. The band consisted of Sly Dunbar (drums), Robbie Shakespeare (bass), Mikey Chung (guitar), Uziah "Sticky" Thompson (percussion), and British guitarist Barry Reynolds, formerly a session for Marianne Faithfull, another Island Records artist, along with synth-keyboards from French-African Wally Badarou (later of Level 42), and then Tyrone Downie (formerly of The Wailers). Under Blackwell's direction, and with co-producer, engineer and mixer Alex Sadkin, the group created the "Compass Point Sound", providing backing for albums including Warm Leatherette, Nightclubbing and Living My Life by Grace Jones and Sheffield Steel by Joe Cocker. This backing band later became known as the "Compass Point All Stars" (CPAS). Blackwell said that he "wanted a new, progressive-sounding band, a Jamaican rhythm section with an edgy mid-range and a brilliant synth player. And I got what I wanted, fortunately".

One resident musician in the early period of the studios was Robert Palmer, who provided backing vocals on Joe Cocker's "Sweet Little Woman", along with Jimmy Cliff. Sly and Robbie used some of the CPAS for Black Uhuru and Gwen Guthrie projects, eventually adding Darryl Thompson, Spaceman Patterson, and Monte Brown (guitars) to the core of the band. An attempt to record a CPAS album ended up as Sly and Robbie's Language Barrier. Compass Point residents later included Chris Frantz (drums) and Tina Weymouth (bass) of Talking Heads, who went on to start Tom Tom Club with co-producer Steven Stanley engineering and mixing. British engineer Andy Lyden came to the studios to work on a Wally Badarou solo project, and became a resident engineer. The core musicians of CPAS lived in a condominium called "Tip-Top", at the top of a hill behind the studio. James Brown came to record with the CPAS, but the project did not work out due to publishing disputes.

The studios developed into a musical community, and through the 1980s, the label of "Compass Point All Stars" was given to many creative projects recorded at or simply connected to the studio, including productions by Bill Laswell, remixes by Larry Levan and François Kevorkian, and resident or non-resident artists of various genres, such as the B-52's. This community is showcased on the compilation Funky Nassau/The Compass Point Story/1980-1986 released by Strut Records, including tracks from Chaz Jankel, Cristina, Will Powers, and Guy Cuevas, as well as extensive interviews by David Katz.

In 1987, for Island Records' 25th belated anniversary, some of the initial CPAS performed live for the first time at Pinewood Studios in London, backing Eric Clapton on "I Shot the Sheriff". Mikey Chung and Sticky Thompson did not participate. A video was released as Island 25: Alright Now.

== Artists ==
Artists who recorded at Compass Point Studios included the Rolling Stones, AC/DC, the Tragically Hip, Grace Jones, Brian Eno, Talking Heads, Madness, Iron Maiden, the B-52's, David Bowie, Emerson, Lake & Palmer, Dire Straits, and Mick Jagger in his solo career.

== Closure ==
As Blackwell moved into other business ventures towards the end of the 1980s, he spent less time on the studio. After producer and manager Alex Sadkin died in a car crash in 1987, the studio began a period of decline into the early 1990s.

In 1992, Blackwell hired Terry and Sherrie Manning, the owners and operators of a recording studio and video production house in the US, to manage Compass Point Studios. After their arrival in late 1992, the Mannings began a complete renovation of the two large studios, rewiring them with modern recording equipment. The studios were subsequently used by artists including Julio Iglesias, Diana Ross, Celine Dion, Sade, Mariah Carey and Björk.

In September 2010, Compass Point Studios closed. According to the Compass Point web page, "Compass Point Studios ceased operations in Nassau as of the end of September 2010 because of a series of incidents, socio-political based happenings which made it untenable to continue business in The Bahamas".

Members of CPAS collaborated remotely on half a dozen projects after the mid-2000s, including Warrior by ex-Black Uhuru Michael Rose, and Grace Jones' Hurricane.

== Albums ==
=== With full CPAS line-up ===
- Black Uhuru: Chill Out
- David Allan Coe: Compass Point
- Grace Jones: Warm Leatherette (feat. "Private Life")
- Grace Jones: Nightclubbing (feat. "Pull Up to the Bumper","I've Seen That Face Before")
- Grace Jones: Living My Life (feat. "My Jamaican Guy")
- Gwen Guthrie: Gwen Guthrie (feat "It Should've Been You", "Peek-a-Boo")
- Gwen Guthrie: Padlock
- Joe Cocker: Sheffield Steel (feat. "Talking Back to the Night", "Ruby Lee")
- Junior Tucker: "Some Guys Have All The Luck"
- Sly & Robbie: Language Barrier
- Tom Tom Club: Tom Tom Club (feat. "Genius of Love")
- Tom Tom Club: Close to the Bone

=== Recorded at Compass Point with some CPAS members ===
- Barry Reynolds: I Scare Myself (by Barry with Mickey, Sticky, Wally, Sly & Robbie)
- Charlélie Couture: Pochette Surprise (with Barry, Mickey, Sticky, Wally & Steven)
- Gregory Isaacs: Night Nurse (with Wally)
- Gwen Guthrie: Just for You (with Wally)
- Jimmy Cliff: Give the People What They Want (with Sly, Robbie, Sticky & Wally)
- John Martyn: Sapphire (with Barry, Sticky, Andy & Steven)
- Ian Dury: Lord Upminster (with Sly, Robbie & Tyrone)
- Lizzy Mercier Descloux: Mambo Nassau (with Wally & Steven)
- Mick Jagger: She's the Boss (with Sly, Robbie & Wally)
- Robert Palmer: Pride (by Robert)
- Robert Palmer: Riptide, Heavy Nova (by Robert, with Wally)
- Serge Gainsbourg: Mauvaises nouvelles des étoiles (with Sly, Robbie & Sticky)
- Talking Heads: Remain In Light, Speaking in Tongues (by Chris & Tina, with Wally & Alex)
- Wally Badarou: Echoes (by Wally, with Andy & Steven)
- Wally Badarou: Words of a Mountain (by Wally)
- Will Powers: Dancing for Mental Health (with Steven)
