= Love Is the Drug =

1975 single by Roxy Music

- 1975 Italian single artwork

Single by Roxy Music

from the album Siren
- B-side: "Sultanesque"
- Released: 26 September 1975
- Genre: Glam rock; progressive pop; funk; disco-rock; disco; plastic soul; R&B
- Length: 4:11
- Label: E.G.
- Songwriters: Bryan Ferry; Andy Mackay
- Producer: Chris Thomas

Roxy Music singles chronology
| "The Thrill of It All" (1974) | "Love Is the Drug" (1975) | "Both Ends Burning" (1975) |

Music video
- "Love Is the Drug" on YouTube

"Love Is the Drug" is a song by the English rock band Roxy Music, from their fifth studio album, Siren (1975), released as a single in September 1975. Co-written by Bryan Ferry and Andy Mackay, the song originated as a slower, dreamier track until the band transformed its arrangement to become more dance-friendly and uptempo. Ferry's lyrics recount a man going out looking for action.

The single was a commercial hit for the band, peaking at number two in the United Kingdom. It also gave the group its first substantial exposure in the United States, reaching number 30 in early 1976 on the US Billboard Hot 100, becoming their highest-charting single and only US Top 40 single. Since its release, the song has been hailed as an early influence on new wave and has been praised for its groove and bassline.

== Background ==
Saxophonist Andy Mackay wrote the basic melody for the song in London in early 1975, explaining, "I came up with chords for an unusual song on my Wurlitzer electronic piano. My chords had a distinctly English-y sound inspired by 20th century classical composers like Ralph Vaughan Williams. They had a folk-harmony feel influenced by early church music." The band then collaborated to flesh out the song in the studio, with vocalist Bryan Ferry and drummer Paul Thompson moving the song in a more dance-oriented style. Mackay recalled:

["Love is the Drug"] started out with my input as slower and a bit stately. The band collectively and [record producer] Chris [Thomas] got the snappier feel. [Bassist] Johnny Gustafson came up with the bass pattern and Paul got that great tight snare sound. Bryan pulled one of his alchemical stunts and sang an almost complete vocal line with fantastic lyrics to general amazement and applause in AIR Studio No. 1 late one night.

After hearing early versions of Mackay's chord progression, Ferry wrote the song's lyrics while at home in Holland Park. He stated, "The image I had in mind for the song was a young guy getting into his car and zooming off into town, looking for action at a club". He cited a Trinidadian friend named Christian for inspiring the song's opening lyrics: "He worked for Roxy doing wardrobe. Christian was a very amusing, laid-back guy. If there was ever a problem, Christian would say, 'T'ain't no big t'ing.' I liked the phrase, so my opening lyrics to the song were: 'T'ain't no big thing / to wait for the bell to ring / T'ain't no big thing / the toll of the bell.'"

Saxophonist Andy Mackay credited producer Chris Thomas with helping the band perfect the song. He recounted, "Chris had a huge impact particularly on 'Love Is The Drug'. His confidence and ability to make us work really hard and redo parts was exceptional. I spent literally hours tracking the sax riffs on 'Love Is The Drug' when they sounded pretty much OK to me. Chris was of course right."

== Release ==
"Love Is the Drug" was the band's choice for the debut single from their fifth studio album, Siren (1975): Mackay commented, "Like most hit singles, 'Love Is The Drug' kind of selected itself and always sounded like something special." The song was a commercial smash for the band, reaching number two in the UK and reaching the top twenty in the Netherlands, Belgium, and Australia. It also reached number 30 in the US, making it the band's highest-charting single there. The band had struggled previously to make inroads in the US, with Mackay lamenting, "North America had been hard for us. We were seen there as an art-rock band."

Though the band did not film a music video for "Love Is the Drug", they did mime the song for a television appearance in 1975. Ferry wore an eyepatch for the appearance, albeit not for aesthetic reasons. He recalled:

It wasn't a piratical fashion thing, as many people thought. The day before our taping, I was sent to the hospital to have my eye looked at. I had walked into a door or something. I remember thinking, 'Oh, God, we've got to do a television show.' Which we did despite my eye. In the video, if you look carefully, you can actually see a bandage with a dressing underneath. But the black patch looked good.

== Critical reception and legacy ==
The song saw positive reception upon its release, with Cashbox writing that "city lyrics intertwined with the imagery of the dance floor make for a clever song" and that the "driving bass gets a hook on the listener."

Since then, "Love Is the Drug" has seen critical acclaim and many music writers point to the song as being a progenitor of future new wave and funk sounds. Dave Thompson of AllMusic concluded, "Indeed, peel away the radio-pleasing buoyancy which is the song's immediate calling card and 'Love Is the Drug' is as grimly unrelenting as any past Roxy attack -- as taut as it is tight, as sordid as it is sensual. Simple Minds, Gang of Four, Public Image Ltd., and the Human League can all trace at least a soupçon of their future funkiness to 'Love Is the Drug,' as can Roxy themselves." In 2019, Marc Myers of The Wall Street Journal characterized the song, with "its pulsating bass line and swaggering croon", as "the swaggering love song that launched new wave".

"Love Is the Drug" was selected as one of The Rock and Roll Hall of Fame's 500 Songs that Shaped Rock and Roll. Its bassline was included in the 2005 Stylus Magazine list of the "Top 50 Basslines of All Time" at number 26. The Quietus praised Gustafson's bassline as a "memorable groove". Nile Rodgers of Chic has since stated that the bassline was a major influence on Chic's song "Good Times".

== Charts ==
| Chart (1975–1976) | Peak position |
|---|---|
| Australia (Kent Music Report) | 18 |
| Belgium (Ultratop 50 Flanders) | 15 |
| Canada Top Singles (RPM) | 3 |
| Netherlands (Dutch Top 40) | 8 |
| Netherlands (Single Top 100) | 9 |
| New Zealand (Recorded Music NZ) | 24 |
| UK Singles (Official Charts) | 2 |
| US Billboard Hot 100 | 30 |
| US Cashbox Top 100 | 24 |
| West Germany (GfK) | 39 |

| Chart (1996)^{1} | Peak position |
|---|---|
| UK Singles (Official Charts) | 33 |

^{1}Remix

== Personnel ==
- Bryan Ferry – vocals, keyboards
- Andy Mackay – saxophone
- Paul Thompson – drums
- Phil Manzanera – guitar
- Eddie Jobson – synthesizers, keyboards
- John Gustafson – bass

== Grace Jones version ==
"Love Is the Drug"
- 1986 remix single cover

Single by Grace Jones

from the album Warm Leatherette
- B-side: "Sinning"; "Living My Life"; "The Apple Stretching"
- Released: 1980
- Label: Island
- Songwriters: Bryan Ferry; Andy Mackay
- Producers: Chris Blackwell; Alex Sadkin

Grace Jones singles chronology
| "A Rolling Stone" (1980) | "Love Is the Drug" (1980) | "Private Life" (1980) |

Music video
- "Love Is the Drug" on YouTube

Grace Jones recorded "Love Is the Drug" for her fourth studio album Warm Leatherette (1980). The track was released as the second single, following "A Rolling Stone" in the UK, while it was the first single to be released in Germany. After failing to chart in 1980, a remix of the Grace Jones version was released in 1986 following the 1985 compilation Island Life and then became a minor hit in the UK, peaking at No. 35. A music video was produced for the 1986 remix and directed by Matt Forrest and Bruno Tilley.

Ferry has since spoken positively of Jones' version, commenting, "I really liked Grace Jones's 'Love Is the Drug' cover, produced by the great Alex Sadkin – she gave it such attitude."

=== Track listing ===
==== Original 1980 release ====
- Dutch and German 7" single – 101 819-100

A. "Love is the Drug" (Single version) – 4:40
B. "Sinning" (Edit) – 4:10

- Dutch and German 12" single – 600 198-213

A. "Love is the Drug" (Long version) – 8:40
B. "Sinning" (LP version) – 5:06

==== 1985 re-release ====
- U.S. 12" single – 0-96860

A. "Love is the Drug" (LP version) – 7:15
B. "Demolition Man" (LP version) – 4:04

==== 1986 re-release ====
- U.K. 7" single – IS 266

A. "Love is the Drug" (E.T. Thorngren Remix) – 3:21
B. "Living My Life" – 5:28

- U.K. 12" single – 12 IS 266

A. "Love is the Drug" (Paul "Groucho" Smykle Remix) – 6:57
B1. "Living My Life" – 5:28
B2. "The Apple Stretching" (LP version) – 6:55

=== Chart performance ===
| Chart (1986) | Peak position |
|---|---|
| European Top 100 Singles (Eurotipsheet) | 91 |
| Germany (GfK) | 57 |
| Ireland (IRMA) | 18 |
| UK Singles (Official Charts) | 35 |
