= Alex Sadkin =

American record producer (1949–1987)

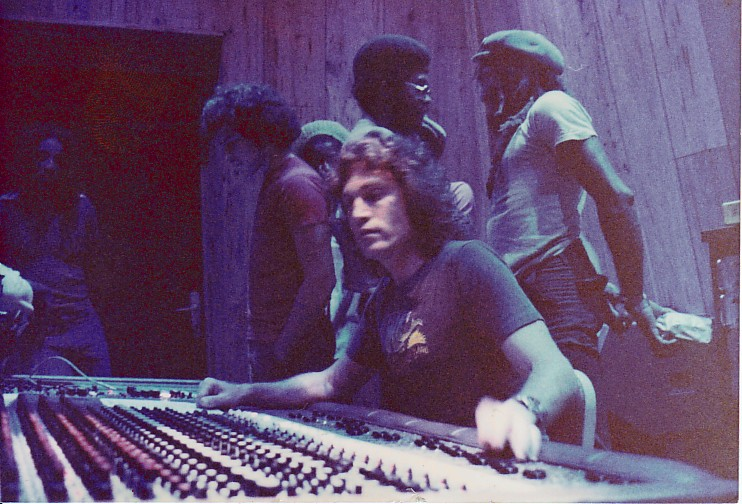
- Sadkin circa 1979

Background information
- Born: April 9, 1949; Fort Lauderdale, Florida, U.S.
- Died: July 23, 1987 (aged 38) Nassau, Bahamas
- Genres: Rock; reggae; new wave
- Occupations: Record producer; engineer; mixer; mastering engineer
- Years active: 1975–1987

Alex Sadkin (April 9, 1949 – July 23, 1987) was an American record producer, engineer, mixer and mastering engineer.

== Early life ==
Sadkin grew up in Fort Lauderdale, Florida, and played saxophone in Sunrise Junior High School and Fort Lauderdale High School. Sadkin attended the University of Miami in Coral Gables for his first year of college as a biology major. He attended Florida State University in Tallahassee where he played bass guitar with childhood friends Lyle LaBarbera (rhythm guitar) and Jim Hendee (drums), and singer Phil Turk. He eventually received his Bachelor of Science degree in geology in 1971. He got his start in the music industry as a saxophonist for the Las Olas Brass in Fort Lauderdale.

== Career ==
After graduation, Sadkin worked with Jim Hendee at a sea turtle farm called Mariculture, Ltd. on Grand Cayman Island, where they both lived on Seven Mile Beach, a few miles from the town of Hell. During their six months of living and scuba diving there, they got their first taste of playing reggae at several clubs around the island.

When Sadkin returned to South Florida he began his recording career. He was first trained as a mastering engineer but eventually moved into recording studio work as a "tape-op" (Assistant Engineer) at Criteria Studios in Miami, Florida. He got his first big break after impressing Neil Young with his mixing ability, and he eventually became head engineer at Compass Point Studio in Nassau, Bahamas. He worked alongside Island Records boss Chris Blackwell on many of the label's projects, most famously with Bob Marley and the Wailers' Survival album in 1979.

A full member of the Compass Point All Stars from day one, he began producing artists for Island Records (Grace Jones, Marianne Faithfull, Robert Palmer, Joe Cocker), while doing mixing work for other labels (Talking Heads). Among the other artists he produced in the 1980s are James Brown, the J. Geils Band, Thompson Twins, Classix Nouveaux, Foreigner, Duran Duran, Simply Red, Arcadia, Robbie Nevil and Paul Haig.

Sadkin produced the first two of the Thompson Twins' (as a trio) albums, Quick Step & Side Kick (1983) and Into the Gap (1984) as well as the original UK single release of "Lay Your Hands on Me", in late 1984. However, the band parted company with him as the producer for their next album and opted to produce Here's to Future Days by themselves in Paris; after the collapse of the singer Tom Bailey, the release was postponed. The postponement caused them to rethink the project and producer Nile Rodgers was subsequently called in to rework the album with them, along with Sadkin's production of the single "Lay Your Hands on Me" and was released in 1985.

Sadkin was a mentor to engineer and producer Phil Thornalley, who would go on to work with The Cure, Bryan Adams, and Natalie Imbruglia. He had a special gift of being able to sense and analyze an artist's inner creative abilities and talents, even if the artist could not. Composer-keyboardist Wally Badarou had this to say about Sadkin: "His dedication to maintaining genuine 'mixes in progress' from the word go, was a great lesson. I made it a system for my subsequent production from then on."

== Death ==
Sadkin died in a motor accident in Nassau on July 23, 1987 at the age of 38, shortly after completing production work on Boom Crash Opera's eponymous 1987 album, and just before he was due to begin working with Ziggy Marley. The songs "Do You Believe in Shame?" by Duran Duran, "Too Soon" by Robbie Nevil, and Grace Jones' "Well Well Well" are all dedicated to his memory. Joe Cocker's album Unchain My Heart (1987) is dedicated to the memory of Alex Sadkin, the quote from the album cover stating 'A Man who lived for music, and a good friend'.

== Selected production credits ==
- Stephen Stills – Illegal Stills (1976) — mixing
- Bob Marley and the Wailers - Rastaman Vibration (1976) — mixing
- Stills-Young-Band – Long May You Run (1976) — mixing
- Third World – Journey to Addis (1978)
- Bob Marley and the Wailers – Survival (1979)
- Grace Jones – Warm Leatherette (1980)
- Robert Palmer – Clues (1980) — mixing
- Grace Jones – Nightclubbing (1981)
- Grace Jones – Living My Life (1982)
- Joe Cocker – Sheffield Steel (1982)
- Thompson Twins – Quick Step & Side Kick (1983)
- Paul Haig (ex-Josef K) – Rhythm of Life (1983)
- Talking Heads – Speaking in Tongues (1983) — mixing credit
- Duran Duran – Is There Something I Should Know? (1983) — mixing credit
- Duran Duran – Seven and the Ragged Tiger (1983)
- Classix Nouveaux - Secret (1983)
- Thompson Twins – Into the Gap (1984)
- Thompson Twins – "Lay Your Hands on Me" (1984) — original single production, later retooled by Nile Rodgers (1985)
- Foreigner – Agent Provocateur (1984)
- Arcadia – So Red the Rose (1985)
- Robbie Nevil – Robbie Nevil (1986)
- Boom Crash Opera – Boom Crash Opera (1987)
- Simply Red – Men and Women (1987)
- XTC – Wonderland_(XTC_song) (1983) mixing
