= Grace Jones discography =

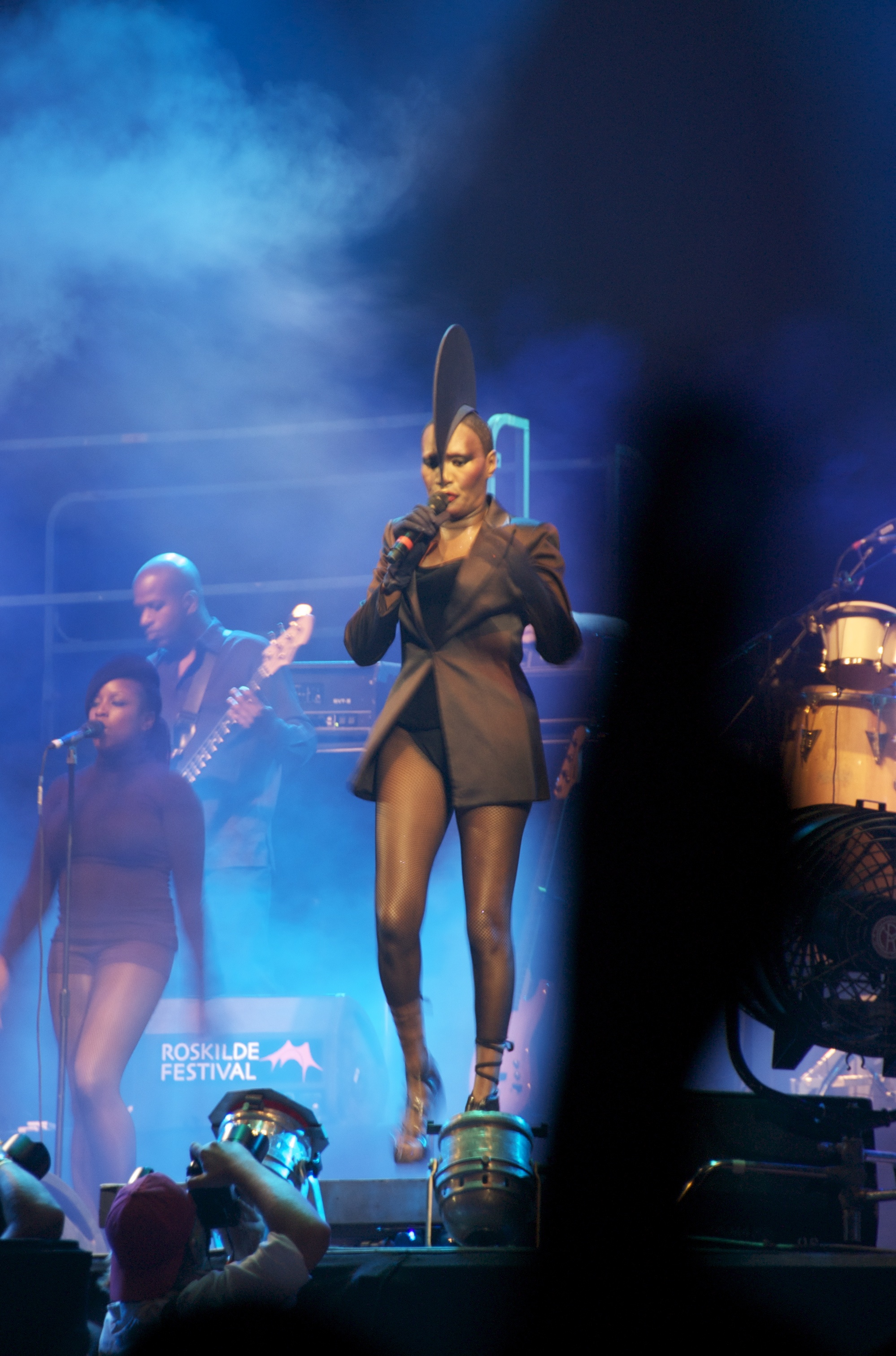
- Jones performing in Roskilde Festival in 2009
- Studio albums: 10
- Compilation albums: 10
- Remix albums: 1
- Singles: 56
- Video albums: 4
- Music videos: 19
- Guest appearances: 16

Grace Jones' discography consists of 10 studio albums, 10 compilation albums, 1 remix album, 4 video albums and 56 singles.

Jones began her recording career in 1975 with a disco song "I Need a Man" which became her first number one on Billboard's Hot Dance Club Songs chart two years later. She has since topped this chart with "Slave to the Rhythm" in 1985, "Love on Top of Love" in 1989 and "Sex Drive" in 1993, scoring four number one club hits in the United States, with a total of 17 entries on this chart. The singer also holds six entries on the US R&B chart, the most successful being "Pull Up to the Bumper" at number five. Internationally, her most successful single in terms of commercial performance is arguably the 1985 "Slave to the Rhythm".

Jones achieved chart prominence with her 1981 breakthrough album Nightclubbing which entered top 10 in five countries and was her first album to receive recording certifications for its sales. Jones' commercially most successful album to date remains her 1985 compilation Island Life.

== Albums ==
=== Studio albums ===
List of studio albums, with selected chart positions, sales figures and certifications
Title	Album details	Peak chart positions										Certifications
Title	Album details	AUS	GER	ITA	NLD	NOR	NZL	SWE	SWI	UK	US	Certifications
Portfolio	Released: September 6, 1977; Label: Island; Formats: CD, LP, cassette, digital download	27	—	9	8	—	—	22	—	—	109	
Fame	Released: June 7, 1978; Label: Island; Formats: CD, LP, cassette, digital download	59	—	15	—	—	—	22	—	—	97	
Muse	Released: September 4, 1979; Label: Island; Formats: CD, LP, cassette, digital download	—	—	—	—	—	—	38	—	—	156	
Warm Leatherette	Released: May 9, 1980; Label: Island; Formats: CD, LP, cassette, Blu-ray, digital download	47	—	—	—	—	—	—	—	45	132	
Nightclubbing	Released: May 11, 1981; Label: Island; Formats: CD, LP, cassette, Blu-ray, digital download	19	8	—	2	19	3	4	—	35	32	ARIA: Platinum; BVMI: Gold; RMNZ: Platinum
Living My Life	Released: November 1, 1982; Label: Island; Formats: CD, LP, cassette, digital download	34	46	—	18	13	3	7	—	15	86	RMNZ: Platinum
Slave to the Rhythm	Released: October 28, 1985; Label: Island; Formats: CD, LP, cassette, digital download	34	10	15	8	13	11	23	9	12	73	RMNZ: Platinum
Inside Story	Released: November 14, 1986; Label: Manhattan; Formats: CD, LP, cassette, digital download	51	38	—	—	—	12	34	30	61	81	BPI: Silver
Bulletproof Heart	Released: October 13, 1989; Label: Capitol; Formats: CD, LP, cassette, digital download	108	55	—	—	—	—	—	—	—	—	
Hurricane	Released: November 3, 2008; Label: Wall of Sound; PIAS; Formats: CD, LP, digital download	123	19	40	63	—	37	34	28	42	—	
"—" denotes releases that did not chart or were not released.

=== Remix albums ===
List of albums, with selected chart positions, and certifications
Title	Album details	Charts
Title	Album details	US Dance
Hurricane - Dub	Released: 5 September 2011; Label: Wall of Sound, PIAS; Format: CD, LP, digital download	20

=== Compilation albums ===
List of studio albums, with selected chart positions, sales figures and certifications
Title	Album details	Peak chart positions									Certifications
Title	Album details	AUS	AUT	GER	NLD	NOR	NZL	SWI	UK	US	Certifications
Island Life	Released: December 3, 1985; Label: Island; Formats: CD, LP, cassette, digital download	9	10	22	14	19	1	22	4	161	ARIA: Gold; BPI: Gold; IFPI AUT: Gold; RMNZ: Platinum
The Ultimate	Released: 1993; Label: Island; Formats: CD, digital download	—	—	—	33	—	—	—	—	—	
Private Life: The Compass Point Sessions	Released: June 16, 1998; Label: Island; Formats: CD, digital download	—	—	—	—	—	37	—	158	—	
20th Century Masters – The Millennium Collection: The Best of Grace Jones	Released: October 21, 2003; Label: Island; Formats: CD, digital download	—	—	—	—	—	—	—	—	—	
The Universal Masters Collection	Released: December 2, 2003; Label: Island; Formats: CD, digital download	—	—	—	—	—	—	—	—	—	
The Collection	Released: 2004; Label: Universal; Spectrum; Formats: CD, digital download	—	—	—	—	—	—	—	—	—	
The Grace Jones Story	Released: April 4, 2006; Label: Universal; Formats: CD, digital download	—	—	—	—	—	—	—	—	—	
The Ultimate Collection	Released: October 20, 2006; Label: Universal; Formats: CD, digital download	—	—	—	—	—	—	—	—	—	
Icon	Released: January 22, 2013; Label: Universal; Formats: CD, digital download	—	—	—	—	—	—	—	—	—	
Disco (Portfolio, Fame, Muse boxed set)	Released: May 4, 2015; Label: Island; Universal; Formats: CD, LP, Blu-ray	—	—	—	—	—	—	—	99	—	
"—" denotes releases that did not chart or were not released.

== Singles ==
List of singles, with selected chart positions
Year	Title	Peak chart positions										Album
Year	Title	AUS	BEL	GER	ITA	NLD	NZL	UK	US	US R&B	US Dan	Album
1975	"I Need a Man"	—	—	—	—	—	—	—	—	—	—	single only
1976	"I'll Find My Way to You" (Italy only)	—	—	—	—	—	—	—	—	—	—	single only
1976	"Sorry"	—	—	—	—	—	—	—	—	—	—	single only
1976	"That's the Trouble"	—	—	—	—	—	—	—	—	—	—	single only
1977	"La Vie en rose"	—	13	—	3	—	—	—	109	—	10	Portfolio
1977	"I Need a Man" (re-release)	—	19	—	—	—	—	—	83	—	1	Portfolio
1977	"Sorry" (re-release)	—	—	—	—	—	—	—	71	—	7	Portfolio
1978	"Do or Die"	—	—	—	—	—	—	—	—	—	3	Fame
1978	"Autumn Leaves"	—	—	—	—	—	—	—	—	—	—	Fame
1978	"Fame" (US only)	—	—	—	—	—	—	—	—	—	3	Fame
1978	"Am I Ever Gonna Fall in Love in New York City" (Australia only)	—	—	—	—	—	—	—	—	—	—	Fame
1979	"On Your Knees"	—	—	—	—	—	—	—	—	—	28	Muse
1980	"A Rolling Stone" (UK only)	—	—	—	—	—	—	—	—	—	—	Warm Leatherette
1980	"Love Is the Drug"	—	—	—	—	—	—	—	—	—	—	Warm Leatherette
1980	"Private Life"	—	—	—	—	—	—	17	—	—	—	Warm Leatherette
1980	"The Hunter Gets Captured by the Game"	—	—	—	—	—	—	—	—	87	—	Warm Leatherette
1980	"Warm Leatherette"	—	—	—	—	—	—	—	—	—	20	Warm Leatherette
1980	"Breakdown" (US only)	—	—	—	—	—	—	—	—	—	—	Warm Leatherette
1980	"Pars" (France only)	—	—	—	—	—	—	—	—	—	—	Warm Leatherette
1981	"Demolition Man"	—	—	—	—	—	—	—	—	—	—	Nightclubbing
1981	"I've Seen That Face Before (Libertango)"	—	1	16	44	4	—	—	—	—	—	Nightclubbing
1981	"Pull Up to the Bumper"/"La Vie en rose"	67	14	26	—	16	13	53	101	5	2	Nightclubbing
1981	"Use Me" (US only)	—	—	—	—	—	—	—	—	—	—	Nightclubbing
1981	"Feel Up" (US only)	—	—	—	—	—	—	—	—	—	—	Nightclubbing
1981	"Walking in the Rain"	94	—	67	—	—	34	—	—	—	—	Nightclubbing
1982	"Nipple to the Bottle" (North America, Netherlands & Australasia)	33	7	—	—	16	3	—	103	17	2	Living My Life
1982	"Nipple to the Bottle"/"The Apple Stretching"	—	—	—	—	—	—	50	—	—	—	Living My Life
1983	"My Jamaican Guy"	—	—	—	—	—	39	56	—	—	—	Living My Life
1983	"Cry Now, Laugh Later" (US & Canada)	—	—	—	—	—	—	—	—	64	33	Living My Life
1983	"Unlimited Capacity for Love" (Netherlands only)	—	—	—	—	—	—	—	—	—	—	Living My Life
1983	"La Vie en Rose" (Re-release)	—	16	—	—	4	—	—	—	—	—	Portfolio
1983	"Living My Life" (UK & Portugal)	—	—	—	—	—	—	—	—	—	—	single only
1985	"Slave to the Rhythm"	20	4	4	7	4	5	12	—	20	1	Slave to the Rhythm
1985	"Jones the Rhythm"	—	—	—	—	—	—	—	—	—	—	Slave to the Rhythm
1986	"Pull Up to the Bumper"	—	14	26	—	16	13	12	—	—	—	Island Life
1986	"Love Is the Drug"	—	—	57	—	—	—	35	—	—	—	Island Life
1986	"Private Life" Remix	—	—	—	—	—	—	91	—	—	—	Island Life
1986	"I'm Not Perfect (But I'm Perfect for You)"	—	18	39	22	39	9	56	69	9	4	Inside Story
1986	"Party Girl"	—	—	53	39	—	—	82	—	—	19	Inside Story
1987	"Crush" (US & Canada)	—	—	—	—	—	—	—	—	—	32	Inside Story
1987	"Victor Should Have Been a Jazz Musician"	—	40	—	—	35	—	—	—	—	—	Inside Story
1989	"Love on Top of Love"	121	—	—	39	47	—	—	—	—	1	Bulletproof Heart
1990	"Amado Mio"	—	—	83	38	—	—	96	—	—	11	Bulletproof Heart
1992	"7 Day Weekend"	—	—	—	—	86	—	—	—	—	—	Boomerang (soundtrack)
1993	"Evilmainya"	—	—	—	—	—	—	—	—	—	—	Freddie as F.R.O.7 (soundtrack)
1993	"Sex Drive"	—	—	—	—	—	—	—	—	—	1	Black Marilyn (Unreleased)
1994	"Slave to the Rhythm" (Re-release)	93	—	—	—	—	—	28	—	—	—	Slave to the Rhythm
1996	"Love Bites"	—	—	—	—	—	—	—	—	—	—	single only
1997	"Hurricane (Cradle to the Grave)"	—	—	—	—	—	—	—	—	—	—	Force of Nature (Unreleased)
1998	"Storm"	—	—	—	—	—	—	—	—	—	—	The Avengers (soundtrack)
2000	"Pull Up to the Bumper" (with Funkstar De Luxe)	54	—	—	—	—	—	60	—	—	—	Keep on Moving (It's Too Funky in Here)
2008	"Corporate Cannibal"	—	—	—	—	—	—	—	—	—	—	Hurricane
2008	"Williams' Blood"	—	44	—	—	—	—	131	—	—	—	Hurricane
2009	"Well Well Well"	—	—	—	—	—	—	—	—	—	—	Hurricane
2010	"Love You to Life"	—	—	—	—	—	—	—	—	—	—	Hurricane
2011	"Dancefloor" (with Brigitte Fontaine)	—	—	—	—	—	—	—	—	—	—	L'un n'empêche pas l'autre
"—" denotes releases that did not chart or were not released.

== Other charted songs ==
List of songs, with selected chart positions, showing year released and album name
Title	Year	Peak chart positions				Certifications	Album
Title	Year	CAN	UK Stream.	US	WW	Certifications	Album
"Move" (Beyoncé featuring Grace Jones and Tems)	2022	72	76	55	53	RIAA: Gold; PMB: Platinum	Renaissance

== Guest appearances ==
Artist	Album	Track(s)	Date	Label
Thompson Twins	Quick Step and Side Kick	"Watching"	February 1983	Arista
Arcadia	So Red the Rose	"Election Day"	18 November 1985	Parlophone (UK); Capitol/EMI (US)
Jonathan Elias	Requiem for the Americas	"Within the Lost World"	1989	Enigma Records (Can)
Various artists (compilation)	Boomerang (soundtrack)	"7 Day Weekend"	30 June 1992	LaFace
Various artists (compilation)	Freddie as F.R.O.7 (soundtrack)	"Evilmainya"	29 September 1992	Great Pyramid, JRS
Various artists (compilation)	Toys (soundtrack)	"Let Joy and Innocence Prevail"	15 December 1992	Geffen
Various artists (compilation)	The Avengers (soundtrack)	"Storm"	7 July 1998	Atlantic, Warner Sunset
Lil' Kim	The Notorious K.I.M.	"Revolution"	27 June 2000	Atlantic, Undeas, Queen Bee, Big Beat
Brigitte Fontaine	Prohibition	"Soufi"	6 October 2009	Polydor
Diddy – Dirty Money	Last Train to Paris	"Yeah Yeah You Would"	14 December 2010	Bad Boy, Interscope
Brigitte Fontaine	L'un n'empêche pas l'autre	"Dancefloor", "Caravane"	31 May 2011	Polydor
Various artists (compilation)	The Hunger Games: Mockingjay, Part 1 – Original Motion Picture Soundtrack	"Original Beast"	17 November 2014	Republic
Gorillaz	Humanz	"Charger"	28 April 2017	Parlophone
Beyoncé, Tems	Renaissance	"Move"	29 July 2022	Parkwood, Columbia
Dave Okumu & the 7 Generations	I Came from Love	"Two Things", "7 Generations", "A Paradise"	14 April 2023	Transgressive
Janelle Monáe	The Age of Pleasure	"Ooh La La"	9 June 2023	Atlantic

== Videography ==
=== Video albums ===
- 1982: A One Man Show
- 1983: The Video Singles
- 1986: State of Grace
- 2018: Bloodlight and Bami

=== Music videos ===
Year	Video	Director(s)
1977	"I Need a Man"	
1978	"La Vie en rose"	
1978	"Do or Die"	Enzo Trapani
1978	"Anema e core"	Enzo Trapani
1978	"Fame"	Enzo Trapani
1978	"Am I Ever Gonna Fall in Love in New York City"	Enzo Trapani
1980	"Private Life"	Mike Mansfield
1981	"I've Seen That Face Before (Libertango)"	Jean-Paul Goude
1981	"Pull Up to the Bumper"	Jean-Paul Goude
1982	"My Jamaican Guy"	Jean-Paul Goude
1982	"Living My Life"	Jean-Paul Goude
1985	"Slave to the Rhythm"	Jean-Paul Goude
1986	"Love Is the Drug"	Matt Forrest and Bruno Tilley
1986	"I'm Not Perfect (But I'm Perfect for You)"	Grace Jones, Keith Haring
1987	"Crush"	
1989	"Love on Top of Love"	Greg Gorman
2008	"Corporate Cannibal"	Nick Hooker
2009	"Williams' Blood"	
2010	"Love You to Life"	Chris Levine and Why Not Associates
