= Grace Jones: Bloodlight and Bami =

- UK theatrical release poster
- Directed by: Sophie Fiennes
- Produced by: Christine Langan; Joe Oppenheimer; Lizzie Francke; Keith Potter; Francesca von Habsburg; Danielle Ryan; Alan Maher; James Wilson; Émilie Blézat; Sophie Fiennes; Beverly Jones; Shani Hinton; Katie Holly
- Starring: Grace Jones
- Cinematography: Remko Schnorr
- Edited by: Sophie Fiennes
- Music by: Ivor Guest
- Production company: BBC Films
- Distributed by: Trafalgar Releasing (UK)
- Release dates: 7 September 2017 (TIFF); 25 October 2017 (United Kingdom)
- Running time: 115 minutes
- Countries: United Kingdom; Ireland
- Languages: English; French

Grace Jones: Bloodlight and Bami is a 2017 biographical documentary film about Jamaican singer Grace Jones, directed by Sophie Fiennes. It premiered at the Toronto International Film Festival and subsequently met with generally favorable reviews.

The film's title references the red light that illuminates in a recording studio when an artist is in the process of recording, which Sly and Robbie would refer to as "bloodlight" when working with Jones, as well as bami, a traditional Jamaican flatbread.

== Background ==
Grace Jones and Sophie Fiennes first met at the screening of a 2002 film about Noel Jones' church, Hoover Street Revival, which Fiennes had directed. The two sparked a connection and decided to make a documentary together, which would end up being over twelve years in the making, interrupted by Jones completing her band and working on a memoir, and Fiennes' pregnancy and other film projects.

The documentary follows Jones as she is visiting her family in Jamaica, recording the Hurricane album, and touring internationally, including in Paris and New York City. Interwoven into the film is also concert footage, with live performances of "Slave to the Rhythm", "Williams' Blood", "This Is", "Warm Leatherette", "Nipple to the Bottle", "Pull Up to the Bumper", and "Love Is the Drug".

== Release ==
The film premiered on 7 September 2017 in Canada at the 42nd Toronto International Film Festival. It was subsequently screened at El Gouna Film Festival in Egypt, Zurich Film Festival in Switzerland, Rio de Janeiro International Film Festival in Brazil, Doclisboa in Portugal, and Film Fest Gent in Belgium, among others. In the UK, the film premiered on 25 October at the BFI Southbank, followed by its cinema release on 27 October 2017.

The documentary continued its run of festival screenings, premiering in Italy at Torino Film Festival in November 2017, in Norway at Tromsø International Film Festival in January 2018, in Denmark at CPH:DOX in March, and in Turkey at International Istanbul Film Festival in April, among others. It was then released in the US, debuting in New York on 13 and Los Angeles on 20 April 2018. In May, the film was presented at Docaviv in Israel, Docs Against Gravity in Poland, and Beat Film Festival in Russia.

Grace Jones: Bloodlight and Bami was released in the DVD and Blu-ray formats as well as digital platforms such as iTunes Store and Netflix throughout 2018. The physical release reached no. 2 on the UK Music Video Chart.

== Reception ==
Grace Jones: Bloodlight and Bami met with generally favorable reviews. It has an 86% approval rating on Rotten Tomatoes and holds a weighted average of 75/100 on Metacritic. In a The Big Issue review, it was referred to as "bold and fascinating". Los Angeles Times praised the film as a "rich, delicate tapestry of a life, where each thread is lovingly woven together to create a full picture". Fiennes' approach was described as "cinematic and rousing" as well as "moving and revealing".

In a more mixed review, The Independent stated that the documentary is "fascinating and enjoyable" yet without explanatory voice-over or archive footage, it only gives "half a picture of its subject", leaving the audience to "clamour for more information". Similarly, Empire referred to it as an "engaging, visually striking" and "fitting tribute to a music icon", but opined that it is "only partially successful" in an "attempt to uncover the 'real' Grace Jones". Some reviewers also described the film as "devoid of backstory, context" or "background of any kind".
