= Sex Drive =

Sex drive refers to libido, a person's drive for sexual activity.

Sex Drive may also refer to:

- Sex Drive (film), a 2008 comedy
- "Sex Drive" (Grace Jones song), a 1993 song by Grace Jones
- "Sex Drive" (Dead or Alive song), 1995
- "Sex Drive", a 1980 single by The Embarrassment
- "Sex Drive", a 1991 song by The Rolling Stones from Flashpoint
- "Sex Drive", a 2019 song by Machine Gun Kelly from Hotel Diablo
