= John Schoonraad =

British special effects artist (born 1952)

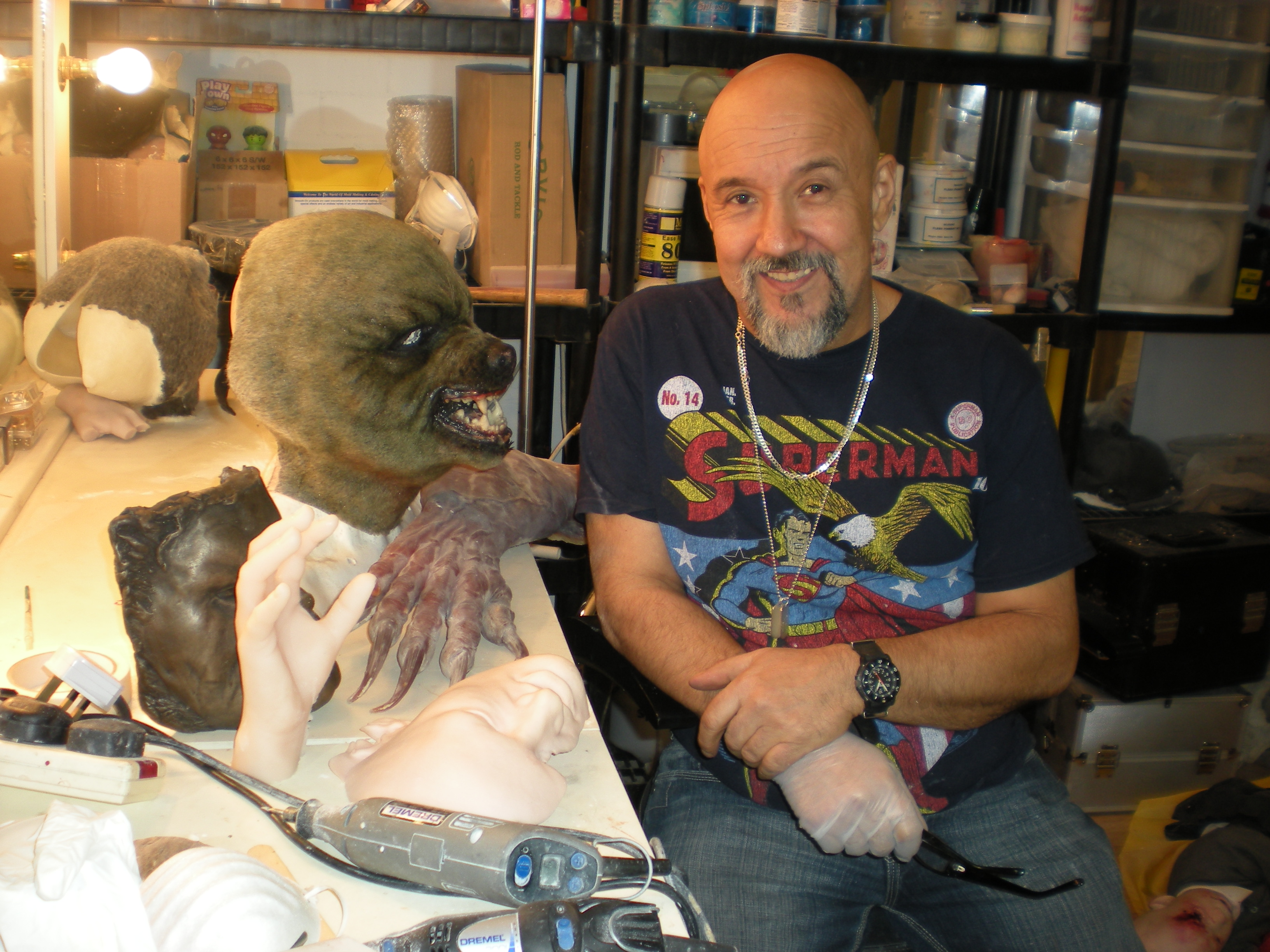
- John Schoonraad at Elstree Studios, 2011
- Born: 2 October 1952 (age 73); Harrow, Middlesex, United Kingdom
- Occupation: Lifecast special effects artist
- Years active: 1981–present
- Children: 2
- Website: lifecast.co.uk

John Schoonraad (born 2 October 1952) is a lifecast and special effects artist who has created over 2,000 lifecasts, a technique used in film and television production.

== Early work ==
Schoonraad began his career in 1981 with Green Ice starring Ryan O'Neal, and has contributed to numerous films, including Return of the Jedi, Indiana Jones, Gladiator, Saving Private Ryan, and Troy. He has collaborated with actors such as Russell Crowe, Tom Hanks, Kristin Scott Thomas, and Orlando Bloom. His work includes creating lifecasts for The English Patient and additional casts for films such as The Clash of The Titans and Casino Royale, as well as supervising the cutting in half of a Boeing 727.

== Later work ==
Schoonraad's lifecasts have been featured in drama films such as The English Patient, as well as in science fiction and fantasy films, including Return of the Jedi, Black Hawk Down, and 28 Days Later. He is currently the creative director of Lifecast Ltd, a special effects company based at Elstree Studios in Borehamwood.

He was part of the creature crew for The Wolfman, working alongside Rick Baker and Dave Elsey, which won the 2010 Oscar for Best Makeup and Hairstyling.

== Music industry ==
In the music industry, Schoonraad created a lifecast of Grace Jones for the chocolate models of her body made by Thorntons chocolate factory featured in her tenth studio album, Hurricane. He also worked on transforming Darkness singer Justin Hawkins into a devil for the video “One Way Ticket To Hell and Back”, which won the Australian MTV Video awards for Best Rock Video. His video career led to work with Björk on her track "The Hunter".

== Family ==
Schoonraad often collaborates with his sons Tristan and Robin on projects, through their company Lifecast.

Tristan has showcased his work at art car boot sales, including Brick Lane, the Big Chill, Mutate Britain's “One Foot in the Grove”, Tate the Biscuit, and the Urban Art Show in Tokyo. He had his own exhibition of Boy Soldier in London and has worked with Art Below involved in exhibiting in Parliament Square on the Plinth of Peace.

Robin participated in the molding of many of the creatures for Harry Potter and The Goblet of Fire, as well as special effects in The Last Samurai.
