= Cameron Craig =

- Occupations: Record producer, mixer, engineer
- Website: www.cameroncraig.co.uk

Cameron Craig is an Australian-born London based producer, mixer and engineer. Craig has worked with artists including Adele, Grace Jones, Annie Lennox, U.N.K.L.E., Suzanne Vega, Duffy, Björk, Amy Winehouse, Suede, Joe Strummer, Christina Aguilera, Ed Harcourt and Sia.

He has won two Grammys, including "Album of the Year" for his part in recording Adele's 25 and "Best Engineered Album, Non-Classical" for his contribution to Suzanne Vega’s album Beauty and Crime. Additionally, in 2015 he received an MPG nomination for Recording Engineer Of The Year and again in 2020 for his work U.N.K.L.E featuring Michael Kiwanuka, inspired by Alfonso Cuarón's Netflix film, Roma.

Craig is also noted for his motion picture and television soundtrack work, including The Hunger Games: Mockingjay – Part 1, Citizen K, Fighting with My Family, Trust, Lost in London, and Grace Jones: Bloodlight and Bami.

Beginning his career in Australia, Craig working on a succession of successful albums and securing a nomination for ARIA Engineer of the Year in 1995. Moving to the UK, he initially worked in various recording studios as he built a reputation as a producer, mixer and engineer.

Alongside creating music, Craig is an advocate and campaigner for the music production and broader music making community. He is an Executive Director of the Music Producers Guild (MPG) and a board director of the umbrella music industry organisation UK Music.
