= Williams' Blood =

Single by Grace Jones

from the album Hurricane
- Released: 8 December 2008
- Genre: Soul; funk; rock; gospel
- Length: 5:57
- Label: Wall of Sound
- Songwriters: Grace Jones; Wendy Melvoin; Lisa Coleman
- Producer: Ivor Guest

Grace Jones singles chronology
"Corporate Cannibal" (2008)	"Williams' Blood" (2008)	"Love You to Life" (2010)

"Williams' Blood" is a single by Grace Jones, released in 2008.

== Background ==
"Williams' Blood" is an autobiographical song, written by Jones and music duo Wendy & Lisa, explaining how Jones takes after her mother's, Marjorie Jones née Williams, musical side of the family rather than that of her disciplinarian father Reverend Robert Jones. According to the lyrics, Jones' mother reveals that her grandfather was a musician who traveled with Nat King Cole, womanizing and drinking from town to town. The song describes her family's lament that she isn't more of a Jones like her sister or brother Noel while she expresses her desire to be free. In the song's introduction Jones adapts a line from the first stanza of "Amazing Grace" declaring, "You can't save a wretch like me". At the end of the track when Jones sings the first two lines of "Amazing Grace", her mother Marjorie, a lyric soprano, can be heard singing the same hymn in church. The song's working title was "Keeping up with the Joneses", an idiom heard in the lyrics.

Time Out London described the composition as "among the most personal songs she's ever recorded, celebrating the contradictions between Grace's religious family background and outré public persona". The Independent said the song "employs handclaps and choral refrain to build up an almost gospel fervour".

The song was released as the second single from Hurricane in late 2008. 1,000 12" singles were released featuring mixes by Mad Professor, Greg Wilson, Ivor Guest and Aeroplane. A balearic disco remix by the latter was initially rejected by Jones' label but eventually approved.

== Music video ==
A music video consisting of clips from the June 2008 Meltdown performance, dubbed with the edited studio version of the song, premiered on Hurricane's official website in early January 2009. It was uploaded onto YouTube on 5 February 2009. A Chris Cunningham-directed music video was reportedly in production in late 2008 but remains unreleased.

== Track listing ==
- Digital single
1. "Williams' Blood" (Edit) – 4:02
2. "Williams' Blood" – 5:57
3. "Williams' Blood" (The Trixters Mix featuring Mad Professor/Joe Ariwa) – 6:00
4. "Williams' Blood" (The Trixters Dub Mix featuring Mad Professor/Joe Ariwa) – 6:03
5. "Williams' Blood" (Greg Wilson Version) – 7:35
6. "Williams' Blood" (Ivor Guest Remix) – 4:25
7. "Williams' Blood" (Aeroplane Remix) – 7:27
8. "Williams' Blood" (Aeroplane Remix Dub) – 7:26
- 12" single

A1. "Williams' Blood" (Aeroplane Remix) – 7:24
A2. "Williams' Blood" (The Trixters Mix Feat Mad Professor/Joe Ariwa) – 5:55
B1. "Williams' Blood" (Greg Wilson Version) – 7:31
B2. "Williams' Blood" (Ivor Guest Breaks Version) – 4:23

- 12" promotional single

A. "Williams' Blood" (Electric Dub) – 6:34
B. "Williams' Blood" (Cosmic Jam) – 7:43

- CD promotional single
1. "Williams' Blood" (Radio Edit) – 4:02
2. "Williams' Blood" (Album Version) – 5:57
3. "Williams' Blood" (Mad Professor Remix) – 6:00
4. "Williams' Blood" (Mad Professor Dub Mix 1) – 6:03
5. "Williams' Blood" (Greg Wilson Version) – 7:35
6. "Williams' Blood" (Ivor Guest Remix) – 4:25
7. "Williams' Blood" (Mad Professor Dub Mix 2) – 6:03
8. "Williams' Blood" (Mad Professor Dub Mix 3) – 6:03
9. "Williams' Blood" (Aeroplane Remix) – 7:27
10. "Williams' Blood" (Aeroplane Dub) – 7:26

== Chart performance ==
Chart (2008)	Peak Position
Belgium (Ultratop 50 Flanders)	44
Belgium (Ultratip Bubbling Under Wallonia)	12
UK Singles Chart (OCC)	131
UK Independent Singles Chart (OCC)	5
UK Physical Singles Chart (OCC)	62
