= Corporate Cannibal =

Single by Grace Jones

from the album Hurricane
- Released: 24 August 2008
- Recorded: 2005–2007
- Genre: Industrial; trip hop; funk; thrash rock
- Length: 6:34
- Label: Wall of Sound
- Songwriters: Grace Jones; Ivor Guest; Adam Green; Marc van Eyck
- Producer: Ivor Guest

Grace Jones singles chronology
"Hurricane (Cradle to the Grave)" (1997)	"Corporate Cannibal" (2008)	"Williams' Blood" (2008)

Music video
- "Corporate Cannibal" on YouTube

"Corporate Cannibal" is a song by Grace Jones, released in 2008 as the lead single from her tenth studio album, Hurricane.

== Background ==
"Corporate Cannibal", written by Grace Jones, Ivor Guest, Adam Green and Marc van Eyck, is a song which sonically blends the industrial, trip hop, funk and thrash rock genres, and lyrically exploiting the issue of corporate capitalism. Explaining what led her to write "Corporate Cannibal", Jones said that she was "very obsessed with the subject" and penned the lyrics with Marc van Eyck. The song received flattering reviews from a number of independent blogs, having been described by them as "quite relevant to the times we live in now, with the whole occupy movement and corporate greed" and that it "pretty much sums up the scene in America that has defined our era".

Originally planned to be the title track of the new album, whose title was later changed to Hurricane, the song eventually became its lead single. 12" vinyl pressings of "Corporate Cannibal" were released in a limited number as well as a promo-only CD. Commercially, the single was primarily available as a digital download. The song was remixed by Atticus Ross and Kevin "The Bug" Martin, among others.

== Music video ==
The "Corporate Cannibal" video was directed by photographer and director Nick Hooker. It was shot in black and white, with the only images appearing being Grace Jones' face and upper body shots, digitally distorted, as shown on the single cover. The video premiered at the Meltdown festival in June 2008 and was then uploaded onto YouTube on 4 July 2008, attracting 144,000 views by the time the download single was released late August.

== Track listing ==
- Digital single
1. "Corporate Cannibal" – 6:34
- CD promotional single
1. "Corporate Cannibal" (Edit) – 3:58
2. "Corporate Cannibal" – 6:31
