= Love You to Life =

Single by Grace Jones

from the album Hurricane
- Released: 3 May 2010
- Genre: Reggae rock
- Label: Wall of Sound
- Songwriters: Grace Jones; Bruce Woolley; Mark van Eyck
- Producer: Ivor Guest

Grace Jones singles chronology
"Williams' Blood" (2008)	"Love You to Life" (2010)

"Love You to Life" is a 2010 single by Grace Jones.

== Background ==
The song, written by Grace Jones, Bruce Woolley and Mark van Eyck, showcases strong reggae influences and includes spoken verses (the only sung part of the track is the chorus). Its lyrics are based on a true story of one of Grace's lovers, who was in a coma for several weeks, only to come around in front of her. His first word was Grace's name. "When their eyes first open and you just magically happen to be there, there's a look in the eye that you'll never forget. Like a birth," said the singer.

"Love You to Life" was the third and final single from Jones' tenth studio album Hurricane. Originally scheduled for release on 30 March 2009, it would however be postponed for more than a year, finally being released in May 2010.

== Music video ==
The music video for "Love You to Life" was directed by Chris Levine and Why Not Associates, and drew inspiration from an Irish milliner Philip Treacy and "real life magic". Its launch was announced for May/June 2010. The video was the subject of an exhibition Grace Jones by Chris Levine: Stillness at the Speed of Light at The Vinyl Factory in Soho, London. The exhibition ran from 30 April to 13 May 2010.

== Track listing ==
- Digital single
1. "Love You to Life" (radio edit) – 3:41
2. "Love You to Life" (Mala/Digital Mystikz Remix) – 4:56
3. "Love You to Life" (Cagedbaby & Guy Williams Paradise 45 Rework) – 6:40
4. "Love You to Life" (Pitron & Sanna Remix) – 7:27
5. "Love You to Life" (dub) – 5:23
- 12" single

A. "Love You to Life" (Digital Mystikz Remix) – 4:51

== Chart performance ==
Chart (2010)	Peak Position
UK Physical Singles Chart (OCC)	79
