= Love Bites (Grace Jones song) =

Single by Grace Jones
- Released: 17 December 1996
- Genre: Dance
- Label: Sci-Fi Channel

Grace Jones singles chronology
"Sex Drive" (1993)	"Love Bites" (1996)	"Hurricane (Cradle to the Grave)" (1997)

"Love Bites" is a 1996 song by Grace Jones.

== Background ==
"Love Bites" is an uptempo dance track. Jones sings the song from the perspective of a vampire, perhaps alluding to the theme of her 1986 feature film Vamp. The song was released as a non-label promo-only single to promote the Sci-Fi Channel's Vampire Week, which consisted of a series of vampire-themed films aired on the channel in early November 1996. As the song was released for a promotional use only, and was not commercially available, it did not chart, and has not been since included on any Grace Jones hits compilations.

== Music video ==
A music video was supposedly filmed, but has yet to surface. It sees Jones wearing a blonde wig, and then changing wigs and costumes a number of times.

== Track listing ==
- CD promotional single
1. "Love Bites" (7" Fright Night Mix) – 3:40
2. "Love Bites" (12" Dark Night Mix) – 7:35
3. "Love Bites" (12" Fright Night Mix) – 8:21
4. "Love Bites" (12" Deep Into the Night Mix) – 6:40
5. "Love Bites" (7" Fright Night Instrumental) – 3:52
6. "Love Bites" (7" Deep Into the Night Mix) – 3:45
- 12" promotional single

A1. "Love Bites" (12" Fright Night Mix) – 8:21
A2. "Love Bites" (7" Fright Night Mix) – 3:40
B1. "Love Bites" (12" Dark Night Mix) – 7:35
B2. "Love Bites" (12" Deep Into the Night Mix) – 6:40
