= Evilmainya =

Single by Grace Jones

from the album Freddie as F.R.O.7
- Released: 1993
- Genre: Pop, R&B
- Length: 3:37
- Label: New Music International
- Songwriter(s): Jon Acevski, David Ashton, David Dundas, Rick Wentworth

Grace Jones singles chronology
| "7 Day Weekend" (1992) | "Evilmainya" (1993) | "Sex Drive" (1993) |

"Evilmainya" is a song by Grace Jones, released as a single in 1993.

== Background ==
The song was written by Jon Acevski, David Ashton, David Dundas and Rick Wentworth. It was used in the soundtrack of the 1992 animated film Freddie as F.R.O.7, written and directed by Acevski. The single was not a success and did not chart.

== Tracklisting ==
Maxi-single and digital editions:

1. Black Machine Remix Club Mix (4:25)
2. Black Machine Remix Album Edit (3:41)
3. Black Machine Version Remix by NN (5:51)
4. Black Machine Remix Extended Mix (4:09)
