= 7 Day Weekend (song) =

Single by Grace Jones

from the album Boomerang: Original Soundtrack Album
- Released: 1992
- Recorded: 1992
- Genre: New jack swing
- Length: 4:55
- Label: LaFace; Arista
- Songwriters: Dallas Austin; Grace Jones; Satch Hoyt
- Producers: Dallas Austin; Randy Ran; L.A. Reid (exec.); Babyface (exec.)

Grace Jones singles chronology
"Amado Mio" (1990)	"7 Day Weekend" (1992)	"Evilmainya" (1993)

"7 Day Weekend" is a song by Jamaican singer and actress Grace Jones.

== Background and recording ==
"7 Day Weekend" was recorded by Jones in 1992 for the soundtrack album to the 1992 film Boomerang, in which Jones played the character Helen Strangé. The song was written by Dallas Austin, Jones and Satch Hoyt, and produced by Austin with Randy Ran, with executive production by L.A. Reid and Babyface. The single featured remixes by Austin and Ben Liebrand, among others.

== Track listing and formats ==
- US 12" vinyl single

A1. "7 Day Weekend" (club remix) – 5:27
A2. "7 Day Weekend" (remix instrumental) – 4:38
B1. "7 Day Weekend" (remix radio edit) – 3:33
B2. "7 Day Weekend" (club remix) – 5:27

- Europe CD single
1. "7 Day Weekend" (remix radio edit) – 3:33
2. "7 Day Weekend" (club remix) – 5:27
3. "7 Day Weekend" (remix instrumental) – 4:38
- Netherlands 7" vinyl single

A. "7 Day Weekend" (remix radio edit) – 3:33
B. "7 Day Weekend" (remix instrumental) – 4:38

== Charts ==
Chart (1992)	Peak position
Netherlands (Single Top 100)	86
