= Freddie as F.R.O.7 =

- Theatrical release poster
- Directed by: Jon Acevski
- Written by: Jon Acevski; David Ashton
- Story by: Jon Acevski
- Produced by: Jon Acevski; Norman Priggen
- Starring: Ben Kingsley; Brian Blessed; Jonathan Pryce
- Cinematography: Rex Neville
- Edited by: Mick Manning; Alex Reymant
- Music by: David Dundas; Rick Wentworth
- Production companies: Hollywood Road Films; J&M Entertainment
- Distributed by: Rank Film Distributors
- Release date: 14 August 1992
- Running time: 91 minutes
- Country: United Kingdom
- Language: English
- Budget: $18 million £9.9 million
- Box office: £390,000 (UK)

Freddie as F.R.O.7 (also known as Freddie the Frog) is a 1992 British animated musical action fantasy comedy film written and directed by Jon Acevski and starring the voice of Ben Kingsley. The film was inspired by bedtime stories Acevski told his son about his favourite toy frog working as a secret agent. The story is a parody of James Bond.

The film was released in both the United Kingdom and the United States in the summer of 1992. It was negatively received by critics and audiences. It held the record of the lowest-grossing opening for an animated film at the US box office until The Ten Commandments in 2007, also starring Ben Kingsley and became a box office failure.

== Plot ==
In the Middle Ages, 10-year-old Prince Frederic is orphaned when his evil aunt Messina kills his parents in hopes of taking the throne for herself. Rather than killing the young prince, Messina transforms him into a frog. He escapes and spends the rest of his childhood in his new life as Freddie the Frog. The story flashes forward to the 20th century, where the seemingly immortal Freddie has grown up to become a member of the French Secret Service, with the code name F.R.O.7. He is called to London, England, by the British Secret Service, where a villain known as El Supremo has been stealing the UK's most famous landmarks. By the time Freddie arrives, Nelson's Column, the Tower of London, Buckingham Palace, St. Paul's Cathedral, and Stonehenge are already missing. Assisting El Supremo is his wife, Freddie's still-living Aunt Messina.

Freddie meets his team: Brigadier G, martial arts expert Daphne Fortescue, a.k.a. Daffers; weapons expert Scotty; and Trilby. He learns that El Supremo is planning to steal Big Ben next. Freddie, Daffers, and Scotty go to a secret island in the Outer Hebrides and discover that El Supremo intends to use the shrunken buildings as batteries to power a giant crystal, which will send a powerful sleeping virus across the world, allowing him to enslave the planet. Freddie and Scotty are thrown into a pool of sea monsters, while Daffers gets taken to be brainwashed into a mindless follower of El Supremo and Messina. El Supremo uses the crystal to send his sleeping virus across Great Britain, and the whole country shuts down.

With the help of Freddie's old friend, the Loch Ness Monster, Freddie and Scotty save Daffers from the snake guards in disguise. A final battle ensues between Freddie, Daffers, Scotty, the Loch Ness Monster, El Supremo, Messina, and their army. During the battle, Freddie, Daffers, and Scotty stop El Supremo from conquering the world by shrinking him to an ant's size. Messina then attacks by shape-shifting consecutively into a bat, hyena, scorpion, and boa constrictor. Freddie tosses Messina into an electrical pole, where she gets electrocuted. Brigadier G and his team arrive on time, and Trilby is discovered to be a spy for the villains. Britain is restored to normal, and Freddie, Daffers, and Scotty are hailed heroes. After that, the Secret Service receives a phone call from the United States that Messina, who was secretly alive and well, is starting her plan to take over Washington, D.C., as revenge on Freddie. Hearing the news, Freddie, Daffers, Scotty, and the Loch Ness Monster head off to stop Messina once and for all.

== Voice cast ==
- Ben Kingsley as Freddie/Prince Frederic, a French prince with magical powers. He is orphaned and turned into a frog by Messina, and eventually becomes a member of the French Secret Service and the British Secret Service.
  - Edmund Kingsley as Young Freddie
- Jenny Agutter as Daphne "Daffers" Fortescue, a martial arts expert and Freddie's love interest
- Brian Blessed as El Supremo, the main villain responsible for capturing various monuments, which he plans to use to create a sleeping virus. He is also married to Messina, which would make him Freddie's uncle.
- Billie Whitelaw as Messina, Freddie's wicked power-hungry aunt who kills his parents, steals the throne and turns Freddie into a frog. She has the power to shapeshift into any animal, most notably a cobra.
  - Grace Jones as Messina's singing voice.
- John Sessions as Scotty McGowan, a weapons inventor who befriends Freddie and Daffers / Additional Voices
- Phyllis Logan as Nessie, a Loch Ness monster that Freddie befriends as a frog. She assists him with escaping the sea in the climax of the film.
  - Barbara Dickson as Nessie's singing voice.
- Nigel Hawthorne as Brigadier G, the head of the British Secret Service
- Michael Hordern as King, Freddie's father who is killed by his sister Messina
- Victor Maddern as Old Gentleman Raven
- Jonathan Pryce as Trilby, a sneaky member of the Secret Service and a double agent working for El Supremo and Messina
- Prunella Scales as Queen, Freddie's mother who was killed by Messina one year prior to the events of the film / Additional voices
- Adrian Della Touche (British release)/James Earl Jones (American release) as Narrator

== Production ==
In April 1989, it was reported that Freddie as F.R.O.7 had begun production following nine months of pre-production. The film was produced over the course of three years from 1989 to 1991 with Yugoslavian-born Jon Acevski serving as writer, director, and producer. The animation staff consisted of many who had worked on Who Framed Roger Rabbit.

The budget for the film was $18 million, with an additional $5 million for U.S. distribution and $1.5 million for UK distribution.

The film was inspired by bedtime stories Acevski told to his son about his favorite toy frog working as a secret agent.

== Release ==
The film was theatrically released in the United Kingdom August 14, 1992. The film was released in the United States on August 28, 1992. A home video release followed on August 19, 1995.

Miramax Films purchased the film for distribution in North America. A week after its UK release, the film was released on 28 August 1992 in 1,257 theaters. It was also released theatrically in Spain during the 1992 Christmas season. As a result of the disappointing U.S. box office, the film wasn't initially released on home video in the United States.

=== Alternate versions ===
In 1995, MCA/Universal Home Video in conjunction with Shapiro-Glickenhaus Entertainment released the film on home video under an alternate re-edited version, under the title of Freddie the Frog with new narration from actor James Earl Jones. Nearly 20 minutes of footage (including double entendres) was cut, and several sequences were re-edited. Racially sensitive elements were removed or changed, like the KKK-members and Nazi axis-like soldiers during the "Evilmainya" song sequence and the tourist and punk crows were re-dubbed, not only was this to make the film more family friendly, but was also an attempt to make the movie less confusing to viewers. This re-edit of the film ended up with a G rating from the MPAA as opposed to the PG rating given to the uncut version.

=== Home media ===
Currently, the original version of the film has only seen a VHS release in the United Kingdom from Braveworld Ltd., whilst it was never released on home video in the United States. As previously mentioned, the Freddie the Frog cut was released directly to VHS by MCA/Universal Home Video and Shapiro-Glickenhaus Entertainment in 1995. Though the Shapiro-Glickenhaus cut has been released on DVD in Denmark and Italy, neither version has been released on DVD or Blu-ray in the United Kingdom and the United States.

== Reception ==
Despite a large publicity campaign and huge media coverage of the film's production, Freddie as F.R.O.7 was both a critical and financial flop. The film received negative reviews in its home country and in North America when it was released there.

Renowned animation critic Charles Solomon said, "this 21-gun stinker makes Saturday-morning television look good." He continued by saying, "the improbable story is so full of gaps, it's difficult to believe writer-producer-director Jon Acevski ever read his own screenplay." Derek Elley of Variety said, "A shake 'n' bake mixture of virtually every toon genre going, it makes up in energy what it lacks in originality". "The movie, which bills itself as the most ambitious animated film ever to come out of Britain, is a convoluted adventure story that swirls classic fairy-tale mythology together with modern pop-cultural iconography into an unwieldy hodgepodge," said Stephen Holden of The New York Times. Hollis Chacona of The Austin Chronicle rate the film one star out of five, saying that "a dastardly plot is afoot in [the film]." He said about the animation is "a dreamy, watercolor look, though, it merely looks like an old print."

=== Box office ===
The film grossed £387,922 ($615,000) in the United Kingdom. On 21 May 2007, AOL claimed the film is the lowest grossing animated film of all time by counting its US gross ($1,119,368), while as of August 2009, two widely released animated features, The Ten Commandments, which grossed $952,820 in 830 theaters (and also had Ben Kingsley) and Delgo ($694,782 / 2,160 theaters) have grossed less than F.R.O.7. Total losses on the film are estimated to be around $25 million.

== Cancelled sequel ==
When the film was released, a proposed sequel, entitled Freddie Goes to Washington, was already in early production. There is little to no information on what the plot would have been like. However, it is speculated that after the events of the first movie, Freddie and his allies would have traveled to Washington D.C. to finally defeat Messina for good, and Freddie would've changed back into a human. Due to the disastrous critical and financial performance of the film, production was cancelled, and the animation studio filed for bankruptcy shortly afterward. As of 2016, no other information of Washington exists outside a few pencil tests which still can be seen on a YouTube video uploaded back in 2009; presumably from a former animator involved in the film's production.
