= Hurricane (Cradle to the Grave) =

Single by Grace Jones

from the album Force of Nature
- Released: 16 December 1997
- Recorded: 1997
- Genre: Trip hop
- Length: 3:03
- Songwriter(s): Grace Jones, Tricky
- Producer(s): Tricky

Grace Jones singles chronology
"Love Bites" (1996)	"Hurricane (Cradle to the Grave)" (1997)	"Corporate Cannibal" (2008)

"Hurricane (Cradle to the Grave)" is a song recorded by Grace Jones in 1997.

== Background ==
The song was a collaboration with trip hop artist Tricky, intended for an album Force of Nature, planned to be released in 1998. Due to heavy disagreements between Jones and Tricky, the album was never completed, and only a scarce white label 12" single featuring two DJ Emily mixes by of the song was released. Jones later re-recorded the song as the title track of her first studio album release in 19 years, Hurricane, released October 2008.

"Hurricane" was used at the Issa Spring/Summer 2010 fashion show at London Fashion Week. Naomi Campbell was the opening model to the show who strutted to the line "I'll be a hurricane".

== Track listing ==
- 12" single

A. "Cradle to the Grave" (The Hurricane Mix #1) – 9:56
B. "Cradle to the Grave" (The Hurricane Mix #2) – 7:54
