= Slave to the Rhythm (album) =

Studio album by Grace Jones
- Released: 28 October 1985
- Recorded: 1985
- Studios: Power Station, New York City
- Genre: R&B
- Length: 43:08
- Label: Island
- Producer: Trevor Horn

Grace Jones chronology
Living My Life (1982)	Slave to the Rhythm (1985)	Island Life (1985)

Singles from Slave to the Rhythm
- 1. "Slave to the Rhythm" Released: October 1985; 2. "Jones the Rhythm" Released: December 1985

Slave to the Rhythm is the seventh studio album by Jamaican singer and songwriter Grace Jones, released on 28 October 1985 by Island Records. Subtitled a biography in the liner notes, Slave to the Rhythm is a concept album, produced by ZTT Records founder and producer Trevor Horn, that went on to become one of Jones' most commercially successful albums and spawned her biggest hit, "Slave to the Rhythm".

== Background and recording ==
After finishing sessions at Compass Point for her Living My Life album in late 1982, Jones took a break from recording music and focused on an acting career. Within two years, she made her debut as an actress in the 1984 film Conan the Destroyer, where she played alongside Arnold Schwarzenegger. She later appeared in the James Bond film A View to a Kill (1985) as the villain May Day. After finishing filming in late 1984 she returned to the studio to work on a follow-up, ending an almost three-year-long hiatus.

Both the title song and album were written by Bruce Woolley, Simon Darlow, Stephen Lipson and Trevor Horn and was produced by Trevor Horn, who was assisted by Lipson. Slave to the Rhythm was a concept album that featured several, radical interpretations of one title track. The project was originally intended for Frankie Goes to Hollywood as a follow-up to their hit "Relax", but was finally given to Jones. The recording process featured Horn, Lipson and Jones creating a new version of the song every week or so, ballooning the budget for a single song to nearly $385,000 USD. As such, several versions were collected and released as the album proper.

== Lyrics and music ==
Musically, Slave to the Rhythm is a R&B album, that incorporates elements of funk and features go-go beats throughout the album. All eight tracks are interspersed with excerpts from conversations with Jones about her life, conducted by journalists Paul Morley and Paul Cooke, hence the a biography subtitle. The album also contains voice-overs from actor Ian McShane reciting passages from Jean-Paul Goude's biography Jungle Fever. Though recording dates of each version of the song are unknown, "Operattack" was created with vocal samples from "Jones the Rhythm"; while "Don't Cry - It's Only the Rhythm" is a variation of the bridge that appears on "Slave to the Rhythm." "The Fashion Show" could be an early version of "Ladies and Gentlemen: Miss Grace Jones". "Ladies and Gentlemen" was released as a single, under the title of "Slave to the Rhythm".

Besides the eight variations of the "Slave to the Rhythm" theme found on the album, two further were included on the two singles released. These were however given different titles depending on which single, which market they were released on and also which format (7" or 12"); "Annihilating Rhythm" (length 3:37 a.k.a. "Annihilated Rhythm" a.ka. "G.I. Blues" a.k.a. "Jones the Rhythm") and "Junkyard" / "Junk Yard" (length 5:20 a.k.a. "G.I. Blues" a.k.a. "Jones the Rhythm"). On some 12" singles these two tracks were simply released under one joint title: "Jones the Rhythm" and without any length given. None of these "Jones the Rhythm"'s were consequently the same as the opening track on the album.

According to the album's sleeve notes, extensive use of the New England Digital Synclavier was made in its recording.

== Album details ==
=== Artwork ===
Designed by Jean-Paul Goude, Jones' partner at that time, the cover picture is a montage of several copies of a single photograph of Jones, that makes her hair look "extended" and her mouth "stretched". The process of its creation is illustrated in the title song's music video. The artwork has its roots in an earlier design of Goude's, the cover of Cristina's 1984 album Sleep It Off.

In 2008, the Slave to the Rhythm cover was included in Jason Draper's book A Brief History of Album Covers, which described it as "glass-shattering", reconfiguring the singer's image "as someone much more approachable and full of humour than previously thought."

=== Abridged version ===
Portions of the original LP material are absent on several CD reissues. "Jones the Rhythm", "The Fashion Show" and "Ladies and Gentlemen: Miss Grace Jones" are all edited in length (with the latter track matching the 7" single mix); and the interview portions between Morley and Jones are omitted, rendering "The Crossing" a fully instrumental track. "The Frog and the Princess" appears in extended form and is moved further down the running order, after "Slave to the Rhythm". Ian McShane's introduction from the start of the album, "Ladies and gentlemen: Miss Grace Jones", reappears as the intro to the song of the same name. Only the US CD, released in 1987 (Island 7-90640-2), and the 2015 remastered CD retain the same track listing and running times as the vinyl version.

== Singles ==
Only two singles were released from the album. The first, "Slave to the Rhythm", was a major hit and has eventually become Jones' biggest chart success. As previously mentioned, this version of "Slave to the Rhythm" was released on the album Slave to the Rhythm under the name of "Ladies and Gentlemen: Miss Grace Jones". However, due to numerous performances, usage in the music video and the big commercial success, this version is now more often associated with the title "Slave to the Rhythm". The actual album track titled "Slave to the Rhythm", which is rendered on the packaging in capital letters, is entirely different and has been confused for the single version for some greatest hits albums. As of 2024, music streaming services list the final song as "Ladies and Gentleman: Miss Grace Jones ('Slave to the Rhythm' (Hit Version))".

"Jones the Rhythm", the second and the last single, was released at the end of the year, but passed unnoticed, overshadowed by the success of the first single and the release of the Island Life compilation. It had relatively little promotion and no music video was produced for it.

== Critical reception ==
Professional ratings
Review scores
Source	Rating
AllMusic	4/5 stars
Tom Hull – on the Web	B−

Scott Bultman of AllMusic called Slave to the Rhythm "a sonic treat" and a "serious ear candy". Tom Hull wrote that the album is "stuffed to the gills without totally giving up the pretense that [the songs] are still danceable".

== Commercial performance ==
Slave to the Rhythm is one of the most commercially successful of Jones' albums. It performed best in German-speaking Europe and the Netherlands, where it secured top 10 placings. It reached number 12 on the UK Albums Chart in November 1985. The album remains the second highest-charting album of Jones' on the US Billboard 200 (after Nightclubbing) and her only entry on the Canadian Albums Chart. As of December 1986, the album had sold 150,000 copies in the United States and one million worldwide.

== Track listing ==
Original UK/US vinyl & US CD, and 2015 remaster pressings

All tracks are written by Bruce Woolley, Trevor Horn, Stephen Lipson and Simon Darlow.

Side one
No.	Title	Length
1.	"Jones the Rhythm"	6:26
2.	"The Fashion Show"	6:26
3.	"The Frog and the Princess"	7:04
4.	"Operattack"	2:45

Side two
No.	Title	Length
5.	"Slave to the Rhythm"	6:35
6.	"The Crossing (oohh the action...)"	4:58
7.	"Don't Cry – It's Only the Rhythm"	2:53
8.	"Ladies and Gentlemen: Miss Grace Jones"	5:54
Total length:		43:08

Abridged UK CD version

No.	Title	Length
1.	"Jones the Rhythm"	5:24
2.	"The Fashion Show"	4:05
3.	"Operattack"	2:16
4.	"Slave to the Rhythm"	6:12
5.	"The Frog and the Princess"	7:34
6.	"The Crossing (oohh the action...)"	4:51
7.	"Don't Cry – It's Only the Rhythm"	2:53
8.	"Ladies and Gentlemen: Miss Grace Jones"	4:27
Total length:		37:42

== Personnel ==
- Ambrosian Singers – background vocals, choir, chorus
- Peter Banks – guitar – uncredited
- Guy Barker – trumpet
- Pete Beachill – trombone, trumpet
- J.J. Belle – guitar, percussion, bass, vocals, hi hat
- Dave Bishop – tenor saxophone
- Stuart Brook – trumpet
- David Gilmour – guitar samples
- Glenn Gregory – background vocals
- Jean-Paul Goude – design
- Trevor Horn – production
- Luís Jardim – percussion, bass guitar
- Grace Jones – lead vocals
- Stephen Lipson – guitar, bass, keyboards, engineering, synclavier, assisting production
- Andy Macintosh – tenor saxophone
- Gary Maughan – keyboards
- Nick Murdoch – keyboards
- John McCarthy – conductor, choir, chorus
- Ian McShane – voice-overs
- Andra Faye McIntosh – baritone saxophone
- Paul Morley – interview
- Paul Cooke – jovial interview
- Richard Niles – arrangements
- Tessa Niles – harp, background vocals
- The Little Beats – percussion
- Geoff Perkins – trombone
- John Pigneguy – French horn
- Andrew Richards – guitar, keyboards, background vocals
- Andy Richards – drums, keyboards
- Frank Ricotti – percussion, arrangements
- Jon Sinclair – keyboards
- David Snell – harp, French horn
- Stan Sulzmann – alto and tenor saxophone
- Jamie Talbot – alto saxophone
- John Thirkell – percussion, trumpet
- "Shorty" Tim Glover – percussion
- Phil Todd – alto saxophone
- Wallmen – keyboards
- Bruce Woolley – guitar, bass, keyboards, background vocals
- William "Ju Ju" House – drums

== Charts ==
=== Weekly charts ===
Weekly chart performance for Slave to the Rhythm
Chart (1985–1986)	Peak position
Australian Albums (Kent Music Report)	34
Austrian Albums (Ö3 Austria)	7
Canada Top Albums/CDs (RPM)	75
Dutch Albums (Album Top 100)	8
European Albums (Music & Media)	11
Finnish Albums (Suomen virallinen lista)	31
German Albums (Offizielle Top 100)	10
Italian Albums (Musica e dischi)	15
New Zealand Albums (RMNZ)	11
Norwegian Albums (VG-lista)	13
Swedish Albums (Sverigetopplistan)	23
Swiss Albums (Schweizer Hitparade)	9
UK Albums (Official Charts)	12
US Billboard 200	73
US Top R&B/Hip-Hop Albums (Billboard)	25
US Dance Club Songs (Billboard) LP cuts	1

=== Year-end charts ===
1985 year-end chart performance for Slave to the Rhythm
Chart (1985)	Position
Dutch Albums (Album Top 100)	90

1986 year-end chart performance for Slave to the Rhythm
Chart (1986)	Position
German Albums (Offizielle Top 100)	67

== Certifications and sales ==
Certifications and sales for Slave to the Rhythm
Region	Certification	Certified units/sales
New Zealand (RMNZ)	Platinum	15,000^{^}
United States	—	150,000
Summaries
Worldwide	—	1,000,000
^{^} Shipments figures based on certification alone.

== Release history ==
Region	Year	Format(s)	Label
Worldwide	1985	LP, Cassette	Island, Manhattan, ZTT
US, Europe	1987	CD	Island, Island Masters
Europe	2015	HDCD	LMLR, Universal
