= Sex Drive (Grace Jones song) =

Single by Grace Jones

from the album Black Marilyn
- B-side: "Typical Male"
- Released: September 23, 1993
- Genre: House
- Length: 5:08
- Label: Island
- Songwriter(s): Sheep on Drugs
- Producer(s): Mark Pistel; Philip Steir

Grace Jones singles chronology
"Evilmainya" (1993)	"Sex Drive" (1993)	"Love Bites" (1996)

Digital cover

"Sex Drive" is a song by American model, singer and actress Grace Jones, released in September 1993 by Island Records. It became a club hit, peaking at number one on the US Billboard Dance Club Songs chart and number 27 on the UK Club Chart.

== Background ==
"Sex Drive" is a cover version of the Sheep on Drugs 1992 song "Track X". It was written by band members themselves and produced for Grace by Mark Pistel and Philip Steir. It was released on 23 September 1993, by Island Records with a cover of the Consolidated song "Typical Male" as the B-side. The single met with considerable success, topping the US dance chart.

Both songs were to be featured on Jones' then-forthcoming Black Marilyn album, planned for a 1994 release, but eventually shelved due to Jones being dissatisfied with the mixes and her collaborations with producers, who she felt were overly reliant on sampling her vocals and not interested in her as a performer. In I'll Never Write My Memoirs, Jones said: "They made an album that could not be mixed. It was like a bag of broken bits that did not fit together. My songs [...] had been minced." The experience put her off working on music, and for a decade before making her album Hurricane (2008), avoided recording as it had become an "ordeal".

Two remixes of "Sex Drive" were later included on a 1996 compilation Island Life 2, a France-only re-release of Island Life, as well as an edited version of the song on the 2006 compilation The Grace Jones Story.

== Critical reception ==
Everett True from Melody Maker wrote in his review of the song, "It's as vibrant and throbbing and sleazy as you'd expect." Danny Frost from NME named it Pervy Sex Single of the Week, adding, "Grace Jones and Sheep on Drugs: a marriage made in Ann Summers' idea of heaven — and a drop-dead brilliant record to boot." "Sex Drive" was nominated in the category for 12-Inch at the NAIRD 1994.

== Track listings ==
- CD single (Germany)
1. "Sex Drive" (Hard Drive Mix) – 5:08
2. "Sex Drive" (Sex Pitch Mix) – 7:17
3. "Sex Drive" (Dominatrix Mix) – 5:36
- CD single (US)
1. "Sex Drive" (Hard Drive Mix) – 5:08
2. "Sex Drive" (Sex Pitch Mix) – 7:17
3. "Sex Drive" (Dominatrix Mix) – 5:36
4. "Typical Male" (The Real Mix) – 5:48
- 12" single

A1. "Sex Drive" (Hard Drive Mix) – 5:08
A2. "Sex Drive" (Sex Pitch Mix) – 7:17
B1. "Sex Drive" (Dominatrix Mix) – 5:36
B2. "Typical Male" (The Real Mix) – 5:48

- 12" promotional single

A1. "Sex Drive" (Sex Pitch Mix) – 7:17
A2. "Sex Drive" (Sexstrumental) – 6:36
B. "Sex Drive" (Hard Drive Mix) – 5:08

== Charts ==
Chart performance for "Sex Drive"
Chart (1993)	Peak position
UK Club Chart (Music Week)	27
US Dance Club Songs (Billboard)	1
US Dance/Electronic Singles Sales (Billboard)	31
