= Island Life =

Compilation album by Grace Jones
- Released: 3 December 1985
- Recorded: 1977–1985
- Genres: Disco; R&B
- Length: 47:48
- Label: Island
- Producers: Tom Moulton; Chris Blackwell; Alex Sadkin; Trevor Horn

Grace Jones chronology
| Slave to the Rhythm (1985) | Island Life (1985) | Inside Story (1986) |

Island Life is the first greatest hits album by Jamaican singer and songwriter Grace Jones, released in December 1985, summing up the first nine years of her musical career. The album sits among Jones' best-selling works.

== Production and release ==
After the major commercial success Grace Jones achieved with her comeback album Slave to the Rhythm in 1985, Island Records decided to release a best-of compilation at the end of the same year. Island Life would feature songs from most of Jones' Island Records albums: Portfolio (1977), Fame (1978), Warm Leatherette (1980), Nightclubbing (1981), Living My Life (1982), and Slave to the Rhythm (1985). No tracks from Muse (1979) were included. Some of the songs appeared in edited forms, and a remix of "Love Is the Drug" was included. No new songs were recorded for the album. Island Life consists only of previously released material, produced by Tom Moulton, Chris Blackwell, Alex Sadkin and Trevor Horn. American writer and journalist Glenn O'Brien wrote an essay for the record sleeve.

The Australian LP release of the album came with a bonus 12-inch disc containing four songs: "My Jamaican Guy", "Pull Up to the Bumper", "On Your Knees" and "Warm Leatherette", and the 1986 UK cassette release included three bonus tracks: "Demolition Man", "Nipple to the Bottle" and "Grace Jones Musclemix".

In April 1996 Island Records and Universal re-released the album under the name Island Life 2. Released only in France, it featured four additional tracks: "Pars", "Feel Up" and two versions of a 1993 single "Sex Drive", intended for the Black Marilyn album, which remains unreleased to date. This version retains the cover picture of the original album, with the only difference being the yellow-coloured background.

== Artwork ==
The cover picture is one of the most famous images of Grace Jones and was created by her then-partner Jean-Paul Goude. The impossibly graceful arabesque is actually a montage of separate images, following Goude's ideas on creating credible illusions with his cut-and-paint technique. The body position is "anatomically unlikely". The picture was originally published in New York magazine in 1978 and subsequently used in the music video for Jones' hit single "La Vie en rose". It has been since described as "one of pop culture's most famous photographs". Also included in the album sleeve are other well known images of Jones, among them the "twins" photograph, Grace Jones in a cage and wearing a "maternity" dress.

The cover picture was featured in Michael Ochs' 1996 book 1000 Record Covers and has been often imitated in works by other artists. The image was also referenced in Nicki Minaj's 2011 music video for "Stupid Hoe", with Minaj mimicking the pose.

== Singles ==
As no new material was recorded for Island Life, the album was promoted by re-releases of singles. "Pull Up to the Bumper" was remixed and released at the end of 1985. The song, which had peaked at number 53 in the UK when released originally in 1981, climbed to number 12 and became one of Jones' greatest hits in the UK. A special "Musclemix" version of the song was also released, which was a megamix of "Pull Up to the Bumper" and other hits.

"Love Is the Drug" was released as the second single in early 1986, remixed by Eric Thorngren (on 7"). A music video was produced and the single, which had not charted upon its original 1980 release, entered charts in the UK, Ireland and Germany. A remixed version of "Love Is the Drug" by Paul "Groucho" Smykle was also released on 12", and the single re-entered singles chart in the UK. A megamix titled "Re-Mix Re-Mask" was also released on 12", backed with the Smykle remix of "Private Life".

== Critical reception ==
Professional ratings
Review scores
| Source | Rating |
|---|---|
| AllMusic | 4/5 stars |
| Robert Christgau | B− |

The album received favorable reviews from music critics. Andy Kellman from AllMusic website wrote that the album is a mostly concisive overview of Jones catalog which includes Jones's "'70s collaborations with Tom Moulton and her stellar '80s work with Sly & Robbie." He also wrote that although the album is a "decent introduction for casual fans" it lacks of "crucial material like 'Warm Leatherette' and 'Nipple to the Bottle.'"

Music critic Robert Christgau gave the album a B− and felt that a "lot of her best material is simply ignored" in the record.

== Commercial performance ==
Island Life met with a warm commercial reception worldwide. It was a major success in the UK, reaching number 4 on the UK Albums Chart in December 1985, and New Zealand, where it topped the chart in March 1986, thus becoming the only chart-topper in Jones's entire career. CD sales of the album in the United States since 1991 have reached 112,000, according to Nielsen SoundScan.

== Track listing ==
All tracks produced by Chris Blackwell and Alex Sadkin, except for "La Vie en rose", "I Need a Man" and "Do or Die", produced by Tom Moulton, "Slave to the Rhythm", produced by Trevor Horn with assistance from Stephen Lipson, and "Sex Drive" on Island Life 2, produced by Mark Pistel and Philip Steir.

Side A
| No. | Title | Writer(s) | Album | Length |
|---|---|---|---|---|
| 1. | "La Vie en rose" | Édith Piaf; Louigny; Mack David | Portfolio | 7:25 |
| 2. | "I Need a Man" | Paul Adrian Slade; Pierre Papadiamondis | Portfolio | 3:22 |
| 3. | "Do or Die" (7" edit) | Jack Robinson; James Bolden | Fame | 3:22 |
| 4. | "Private Life" | Chrissie Hynde | Warm Leatherette | 5:10 |
| 5. | "I've Seen That Face Before (Libertango)" | Ástor Piazzolla; Barry Reynolds; Dennis Wilkey; Nathalie Delon | Nightclubbing | 4:29 |

Side A – UK cassette release bonus tracks
| No. | Title | Writer(s) | Album | Length |
|---|---|---|---|---|
| 6. | "Demolition Man" | Sting | Nightclubbing |
| 7. | "Nipple to the Bottle" | Grace Jones; Sly Dunbar | Living My Life |

Side B
| No. | Title | Writer(s) | Album | Length |
|---|---|---|---|---|
| 1. | "Love Is the Drug" (remixed by Eric "E.T." Thorngren) | Bryan Ferry; Andy Mackay | Warm Leatherette | 6:02 |
| 2. | "Pull Up to the Bumper" (7" edit) | Kookoo Baya; Grace Jones; Dana Mano | Nightclubbing | 3:38 |
| 3. | "Walking in the Rain" | Harry Vanda; George Young | Nightclubbing | 4:18 |
| 4. | "My Jamaican Guy" | Grace Jones | Living My Life | 6:00 |
| 5. | "Slave to the Rhythm" (7" edit) | Bruce Woolley; Simon Darlow; Stephen Lipson; Trevor Horn | Slave to the Rhythm | 4:22 |

Side B – UK cassette release bonus track
| No. | Title | Writer(s) | Album | Length |
|---|---|---|---|---|
| 6. | "Grace Jones Musclemix" | Various | Island Life |

Island Life 2 bonus tracks
| No. | Title | Writer(s) | Album | Length |
|---|---|---|---|---|
| 11. | "Pars" | Jacques Higelin | Warm Leatherette | 4:48 |
| 12. | "Feel Up" | Grace Jones | Nightclubbing | 4:04 |
| 13. | "Sex Drive" (Sex Pitch Mix) | Sheep on Drugs | Black Marilyn | 7:18 |
| 14. | "Sex Drive" (Hard Drive Mix) | Sheep on Drugs | Black Marilyn | 5:10 |

=== Notes ===
- "Grace Jones Musclemix" is a mashup of (in order) "Pull Up to the Bumper", "Slave to the Rhythm", "Warm Leatherette", "Private Life", "Walking in the Rain", "Use Me" and "Love Is the Drug".

== Charts ==
=== Weekly charts ===
Weekly chart performance for Island Life
| Chart (1986) | Peak position |
|---|---|
| Australian Albums (Kent Music Report) | 9 |
| Austrian Albums (Ö3 Austria) | 10 |
| Dutch Albums (Album Top 100) | 14 |
| European Albums (Music & Media) | 13 |
| Finnish Albums (Suomen virallinen lista) | 24 |
| German Albums (Offizielle Top 100) | 22 |
| Italian Albums (Musica e dischi) | 15 |
| New Zealand Albums (RMNZ) | 1 |
| Norwegian Albums (VG-lista) | 19 |
| Swiss Albums (Schweizer Hitparade) | 22 |
| UK Albums (Official Charts) | 4 |
| US Billboard 200 | 161 |

=== Year-end charts ===
Year-end chart performance for Island Life
| Chart (1986) | Position |
|---|---|
| Australian Albums (Kent Music Report) | 80 |
| Austrian Albums (Ö3 Austria) | 29 |
| European Albums (Music & Media) | 47 |
| New Zealand Albums (RMNZ) | 10 |
| UK Albums (Gallup) | 40 |

== Certifications and sales ==
Certifications and sales for Island Life
| Region | Certification | Certified units/sales |
|---|---|---|
| Australia (ARIA) | Gold | 35,000^{^} |
| Austria (IFPI Austria) | Gold | 25,000^{*} |
| New Zealand (RMNZ) | Platinum | 15,000^{^} |
| United Kingdom (BPI) | Gold | 100,000^{^} |
| United States | — | 112,000 |
^{*} Sales figures based on certification alone.^{^} Shipments figures based on certification alone.

== Release history ==
Release history and formats for Island Life
| Region | Year | Format(s) | Label |
|---|---|---|---|
| Various | 1985 | LP; CD; cassette | Island; Island Masters; Bertelsmann |
| Australia | 1985 | LP | Festival |
| Portugal | 1985 | LP | Island; Dacapo |
| Yugoslavia | 1985 | LP | Island; Jugoton |
| UK | 1986 | Cassette | Island |
| Brazil | 1988 | LP | Island |
| Europe | 1989 | CD | Island |
| US, Europe | 1990 | CD | Island, Island Masters |
| France | 1996 | CD | Universal International |
