= Hurricane (Grace Jones album) =

Studio album by Grace Jones
- Released: 3 November 2008
- Recorded: 2004–2007
- Genres: Dub; electronica; trip hop; R&B
- Length: 48:40 (original); 50:26 (Hurricane – Dub)
- Labels: Wall of Sound; PIAS
- Producers: Ivor Guest; Grace Jones; Antony Genn; Bruce Woolley

Grace Jones chronology
The Ultimate Collection (2006)	Hurricane (2008)	Disco (2015)

Singles from Hurricane
- 1. "Corporate Cannibal" Released: 24 August 2008; 2. "Williams' Blood" Released: 8 December 2008; 3. "Well Well Well" Released: 2009; 4. "Love You to Life" Released: 3 May 2010

Hurricane – Dub cover

Hurricane is the tenth studio album by singer Grace Jones, released in 2008, and her first album of new material in 19 years. The album includes a number of autobiographical songs, and the title track was first recorded as a 1997 collaboration with Tricky under the title "Cradle to the Grave". The album sold over 100,000 copies in Europe. Three years after the original release, Jones released a dub version of it: Hurricane – Dub came out on 5 September 2011.

== Background and production ==
Grace Jones' previous album, Bulletproof Heart, was released in 1989, and despite several comeback attempts throughout the 1990s, her next full-length record would be released almost two decades later. The singer had decided "never to do an album again", changing her mind only after meeting the music producer Ivor Guest via mutual friend Philip Treacy. After becoming acquainted, Guest played Jones a track he had been working on and she set her lyrics "Devil in My Life" to it. In 2007 Guest announced that he and Jones had completed recording the album, originally rumoured to be titled Corporate Cannibal.

The album includes a number of autobiographical songs, these include "This Is", "Williams' Blood" and "I'm Crying (Mother's Tears)". "Love You to Life" is another track based on real events and "Corporate Cannibal" refers to the subject of corporate capitalism. The title track was first recorded as a 1997 collaboration with Tricky under the title "Cradle to the Grave". "Well Well Well" is dedicated to the memory of Alex Sadkin, who had died in 1987, having co-produced three of Jones' 1980s albums. "Sunset Sunrise" ponders mankind's relationship with nature, and the final song, "Devil in My Life", was written after a party in Venice while Jones was standing in the corner observing partygoers. Four songs were ultimately removed from the track listing: "The Key to Funky" (co-written by Jones and Diane Pernet in the late '80s), "Body Phenomenon", "Sister Sister" and "Misery". Another track recorded by Jones, "Volunteer", was leaked in 2007 by Leslie Winer, together with "This", an early version of "This Is". Winer also asserted that she had written both songs with Joe Galdo in the early 1990s. Mainly with Sly and Robbie, Wally Badarou, Barry Reynolds, Mikey Chung and Uziah "Sticky" Thompson, aka the Compass Point Allstars as a backbone, the album retained the reggae-influenced sound of her three Compass Point albums even though it was not recorded at the studios in the Bahamas.

Hurricane's sound is a singular blend of multiple different genres. AllMusic's Jon O'Brien deemed it "an appropriately titled whirlwind of dub rock, reggae, industrial electro, trip-hop and R&B According to Daisy Jones of Vice, the record "weaves together dub, electronica, industrial, reggae and gospel music", while The Washington Post's Allison Stewart categorized it as a "set of dancehall and electro-disco tracks".

The front and back covers of the album features pictures of chocolate heads of Jones, which she revealed on Friday Night with Jonathan Ross shortly before Hurricane's release. Photographs included in the booklet picture the singer as a chocolate factory worker, complete with uniform and name tag. Chocolate heads, as well as arms and legs were molded at the Thorntons chocolate factory in Derbyshire, England by lifecasting expert John Schoonraad, his son Tristan and artist Nick Reynolds.

== Singles ==
"Corporate Cannibal" became the album's first single, released in August 2008 and promoted at the Meltdown festival. The song did not chart. The second single, "Williams' Blood", was released in December, and subsequently became a charting success in Belgium. A promotional only single, "Well Well Well", was released in 2009. "Love You to Life" was chosen as the third commercial single in 2009, but its release would be postponed for over a year.

== Release and promotion ==
Prior to the release, Jones performed a two-hour concert at Massive Attack's Meltdown festival in London on 19 June 2008, during which she performed four new songs from the album and premiered the music video for the first single, "Corporate Cannibal". For further album promotion, Jones appeared on British television talk show Friday Night with Jonathan Ross, several awards galas, and embarked on The Hurricane Tour in January 2009, which garnered positive reviews.

The album was released on Wall of Sound on 3 November 2008, in the United Kingdom. PIAS, the parent company of Wall of Sound, distributed Hurricane worldwide, excluding North America.

Jones dedicated the album to the memory of her father, Bishop Robert W. Jones".

== Critical reception ==
Professional ratings
Aggregate scores
Source	Rating
Metacritic	72/100
Review scores
Source	Rating
AllMusic	3.5/5 stars
BBC Music	Favourable
The Guardian	3/5 stars
Los Angeles Times	4/4 stars
NME	3.5/5 stars
The Observer	3/5 stars
Pitchfork	7.5/10
Record Collector	4/4 stars
Slant Magazine	4/5 stars
Spin	Favourable
The Village Voice	Favourable

Upon release, Hurricane was met with positive reception, obtaining a score of 72 out of 100 on review aggregator Metacritic.

Phil Freeman from AllMusic website gave the album three and a half stars out of five and wrote that "Hurricane is possibly Grace Jones' most focused artistic statement and a worthy sequel to her classic early-'80s albums".

Susie Goldring from BBC Music gave the album a favorable review and wrote that "the album is beautifully produced - with textures that just make you want to savor and unwrap each track, accompanied by the occasional oddity".

Alexis Petridis from The Guardian gave the album a mixed review in which he wrote that even though Jones' persona in the 80s seemed she was "trying to convince the world she was from another planet", in this record "you learn a surprising amount about her upbringing" and that after the "thrilling first half" of the album it "suddenly seems to run out of puff, as if exhausted by the effort of trying to keep up with its star".

Evelyn McDonnell from Los Angeles Times gave the album four out of four stars and wrote that Jones is still "cool" in her fifth decade in the show business. McDonnell praised Jones' collaboration with co-producer Ivor Guest, who "delivers this unquiet storm of a comeback".

Anthony Thornton from NME gave the album three and a half stars out of five and wrote that in "revisiting the production of her ’80s records she paradoxically produces something that sounds timeless" even though "it's difficult to suppress the notion that by miring herself in the ’90s, inadvertently she occasionally sounds as dated".

The Observer gave the album three out of five stars and said that the "contradictions that made her so compelling are now not so much within the songs as between them, leaving less room to maneuver" and that "Hurricane shatters the illusion, and flattens the force of nature known as Grace Jones into something quite humdrum".

Eric Henderson from Slant Magazine gave the album four out of five stars and wrote that it becomes Jones's "autobiographical talking book".

In his review for The Village Voice Barry Walters defined the album as "a multitude of instruments dance in orgiastic precision, paying tribute to an icon of pleasurable excesses, for which we now lovingly long".

== Commercial performance ==
In 2009. It was awarded a gold certification from the Independent Music Companies Association which indicated sales of at least 100,000 copies throughout Europe.

== Re-release ==
Three years after the original Hurricane release, Jones released a dub version of the album. Hurricane – Dub came out on 5 September 2011. The dub versions were made by Ivor Guest, with contributions from Adam Green, Frank Byng, Robert Logan and Ben Cowan.

The dub re-release of Hurricane features new artwork by Jean-Paul Goude of Jones smoking a cigarette whilst wearing a sparkling hat.

== Track listing ==
Hurricane standard edition
No.	Title	Writer(s)	Length
1.	"This Is"	Grace Jones; Mark van Eyck	5:35
2.	"Williams' Blood"	Jones; Lisa Coleman; Wendy Melvoin	5:57
3.	"Corporate Cannibal"	Jones; van Eyck; Adam Green; Ivor Guest	5:54
4.	"I'm Crying (Mother's Tears)"	Jones; Guest	4:31
5.	"Well Well Well"	Jones; Barry Reynolds	3:51
6.	"Hurricane"	Jones; Tricky	6:33
7.	"Love You to Life"	Jones; van Eyck; Bruce Woolley	5:20
8.	"Sunset Sunrise"	Jones; Woolley; Paulo Goude	5:11
9.	"Devil in My Life"	Jones; Guest; van Eyck; Leopold Ross	5:48

Hurricane digital edition
No.	Title	Writer(s)	Length
10.	"Corporate Cannibal" (Atticus Ross remix)	Jones; van Eyck; Green; Guest	8:00

Hurricane – Dub tracklist
No.	Title	Writer(s)	Length
1.	"This Is Dub"	Grace Jones; Mark van Eyck	4:35
2.	"Williams Dub"	Jones; Lisa Coleman; Wendy Melvoin	5:40
3.	"Cannibal Dub"	Jones; van Eyck; Adam Green; Ivor Guest	5:16
4.	"Well Well Well Dub"	Jones; Barry Reynolds	4:10
5.	"Crying Dub"	Jones; Guest	4:58
6.	"Hurricane Dub"	Jones; Tricky	5:20
7.	"Love You to Life Dub"	Jones; van Eyck; Bruce Woolley	5:20
8.	"Sunset Dub"	Jones; Woolley; Paulo Goude	4:45
9.	"Devil Dub"	Jones; Guest; van Eyck; Leopold Ross	5:17
10.	"Hell Dub"	Jones; Guest	5:04

- "Williams' Blood" contains an interpolation of "Amazing Grace", written by John Newton and William Walker.

== Personnel ==
- Wally Badarou – keyboards
- Mikey Chung – guitar
- Neil Comber – mix assistance
- Cameron Craig – sound engineering, mix engineering
- Jonathan de Villiers – photography
- Don-E– keyboards, backing vocals
- Sly Dunbar – drum kit, programming
- Brian Eno – production, keyboards, backing vocals
- Richard Flack – sound engineering
- Antony Genn – production, arrangements, keyboards, backing vocals
- Paulo Goude – keyboards, marimba, backing vocals
- Adam Green – guitar
- Ivor Guest – production, programming, mix engineering, arrangements, keyboards
- Ladonna Harley-Peters – backing vocals

- Sharlene Hector – backing vocals
- Tom Hingston – artwork design
- Will Johnstone – sound engineering
- Grace Jones – lead vocals, backing vocals, production
- Bob Ludwig – mastering
- Robert Logan – drones, drum edits
- Steve Pelluet – sound engineering
- Barry Reynolds – guitar
- Leopold Ross – guitar
- Robbie Shakespeare – bass guitar
- Philip Sheppard – arrangements, conducting
- Martin Slattery – piano, organ
- John Justin Stewart – guitar
- Uziah "Sticky" Thompson – percussion
- Bruce Woolley – co-production, keyboards, backing vocals
- Will Worsley – sound engineering

== Charts ==
2008 chart performance for Hurricane
Chart (2008)	Peak position
Australian Albums (ARIA)	123
Austrian Albums (Ö3 Austria)	23
Belgian Albums (Ultratop Flanders)	14
Belgian Albums (Ultratop Wallonia)	54
Croatian International Albums (HDU)	4
Dutch Albums (Album Top 100)	63
French Albums (SNEP)	36
German Albums (Offizielle Top 100)	19
Greek Albums (IFPI)	24
Italian Albums (FIMI)	40
New Zealand Albums (RMNZ)	37
Scottish Albums (Official Charts)	60
Swedish Albums (Sverigetopplistan)	34
Swiss Albums (Schweizer Hitparade)	28
UK Albums (Official Charts)	42
UK Independent Albums (Official Charts)	2

2011 chart performance for Hurricane - Dub
Chart (2011)	Peak position
US Top Dance Albums (Billboard)	20

== Release history ==
Region	Year	Format(s)	Label
Europe	3 November 2008	CD, digital download	Wall of Sound, PIAS
Argentina	14 April 2009	CD	Wall of Sound, PIAS
United Kingdom	2010	LP	The Vinyl Factory
United States	6 September 2011	CD, digital download	Wall of Sound, PIAS

== The Hurricane Tour ==
The Hurricane Tour
- Tour by Grace Jones
- Location: North America • Europe
- Associated album: Hurricane
- Start date: 19 January 2009
- End date: 21 November 2009
- Legs: 5
- No. of shows: 31

The Hurricane Tour was a concert tour by singer Grace Jones to promote her album Hurricane. The tour sold well and received public and critical acclaim.

=== Setlist ===
The setlist varied from show to show:

Average setlist
1. "Nightclubbing"
2. "This Is"
3. "My Jamaican Guy"
4. "Demolition Man"
5. "I've Seen That Face Before (Libertango)"
6. "La Vie en Rose"
7. "Love You to Life"
8. "Williams' Blood"
9. "Well Well Well"
10. "Love Is the Drug"
11. "Pull Up to the Bumper"
12. "Slave to the Rhythm"

Encore

13. "Hurricane"

Other songs from Hurricane were performed in different dates, including "Sunset Sunrise", "Devil in My Life", "Corporate Cannibal", and "I'm Crying (Mother's Tears)" .

=== Tour dates ===
Europe
Date	City	Country	Venue
19 January 2009	Birmingham	England	Symphony Hall
21 January 2009	Gateshead	England	Sage Gateshead
23 January 2009	Glasgow	Scotland	Clyde Auditorium
24 January 2009	Manchester	England	Manchester Apollo
25 January 2009	Bristol	England	Colston Hall
27 January 2009	London	England	The Roundhouse
28 January 2009	London	England	The Roundhouse
17 March 2009	Berlin	Germany	Tempodrom
19 March 2009	Amsterdam	Netherlands	Paradiso
22 March 2009	Paris	France	Le Grand Rex
25 March 2009	Frankfurt	Germany	Jahrhunderthalle
26 March 2009	Düsseldorf	Germany	Philipshalle
29 March 2009	Stockholm	Sweden	The Circus
31 March 2009	Copenhagen	Denmark	Falconer Theatre
Europe (2)
19 June 2009	Barcelona	Spain	Sónar
3 July 2009	Roskilde	Denmark	Roskilde Festival
4 July 2009	Werchter	Belgium	Rock Werchter
9 July 2009	London	UK	Somerset House
11 July 2009	Montreux	Switzerland	Montreux Jazz Festival
16 July 2009	Stuttgart	Germany	Jazz Open Festival
18 July 2009	Southwold	England	Latitude Festival
North America
26 July 2009	Hollywood	United States	KCRW's World Festival at the Hollywood Bowl
29 July 2009	New York	United States	Hammerstein Ballroom
30 July 2009	New York	United States	Hammerstein Ballroom
Europe (3)
7 August 2009	Monte Carlo	Monaco	Summer Sporting Festival
9 August 2009	Playa d'en Bossa, Ibiza	Spain	Space
15 August 2009	Helsinki	Finland	Flow Festival
21 August 2009	St. Poelten	Austria	FM4 Frequency Festival
23 August 2009	Biddinghuizen	Netherlands	Lowlands
30 August 2009	London	England	Beachdown Festival
North America
21 November 2009	Guadalajara	Mexico	Sonofilla Festival
