= Noel Jones (Pentecostal bishop) =

Jamaican-American minister and bishop

Noel Norman Jones
- Born: 31 January 1950 (age 75); Spanish Town, Saint Catherine, Jamaica
- Education: Aenon Bible College; International Circle of Faith
- Occupation(s): Pastor, author
- Employer: City of Refuge Church
- Title: Bishop
- Spouses: Ruth Jones (div. 1992) Loretta Jones (m. 2022)
- Children: 4
- Relatives: Grace Jones (sister)
- Website: cityofrefugela.org

Noel Jones (born 31 January 1950) is a Jamaican minister and a Pentecostal bishop. He served as the senior pastor of the City of Refuge Church in Gardena, California, US which has approximately 17,000 members, and was formerly the pastor of the Greater Bethany Community Church.

== Early life ==
Jones was born in Spanish Town, Jamaica, on January 31, 1950. One of seven children born to Bishop Robert (who was a politician and Apostolic clergyman) and Marjorie Jones. He was raised alongside a diverse array of siblings (one of whom is the actress and singer Grace Jones). His parents took him and his two siblings, Chris and Grace, and relocated to Syracuse, New York, in 1965.

== Early education and ministry ==
Jones received the call to ministry at the age of 19. He attended St. Jago High School and went on to attain a Bachelor of Science in Theology degree from Aenon Bible College. He would later receive an honorary doctoral degree from the International Circle of Faith College, which is now Life College and Seminary. At the age of 26, he accepted his first pastorate at Bethel Temple of Longview in Longview, Texas.

== Current ministry ==
In June 1994, Jones was chosen to succeed Bishop Robert W. McMurray as pastor to approximately 1,000 members of the Greater Bethany Community Church, located at 84th and Hoover Street in South Los Angeles, California. During his tenure, the church's membership increased significantly, prompting the acquisition of a new building in Gardena, California, in 2003. The new sanctuary, now known as "The City of Refuge," accommodates a growing membership of 17,000. The church has a choir known as the City of Refuge Sanctuary Choir. Their 2007 debut album, Welcome to the City, charted on the Billboard 200 chart and reached number one on the Billboard Top Gospel Albums chart.

== Documentary film ==
English film director and producer Sophie Fiennes, in 2002, made a documentary film about the Greater Bethany Community Church titled Hoover Street Revival.
