= Grace Jones =

Jamaican singer, actress and model (born 1948)

The Honourable Grace Jones OJ
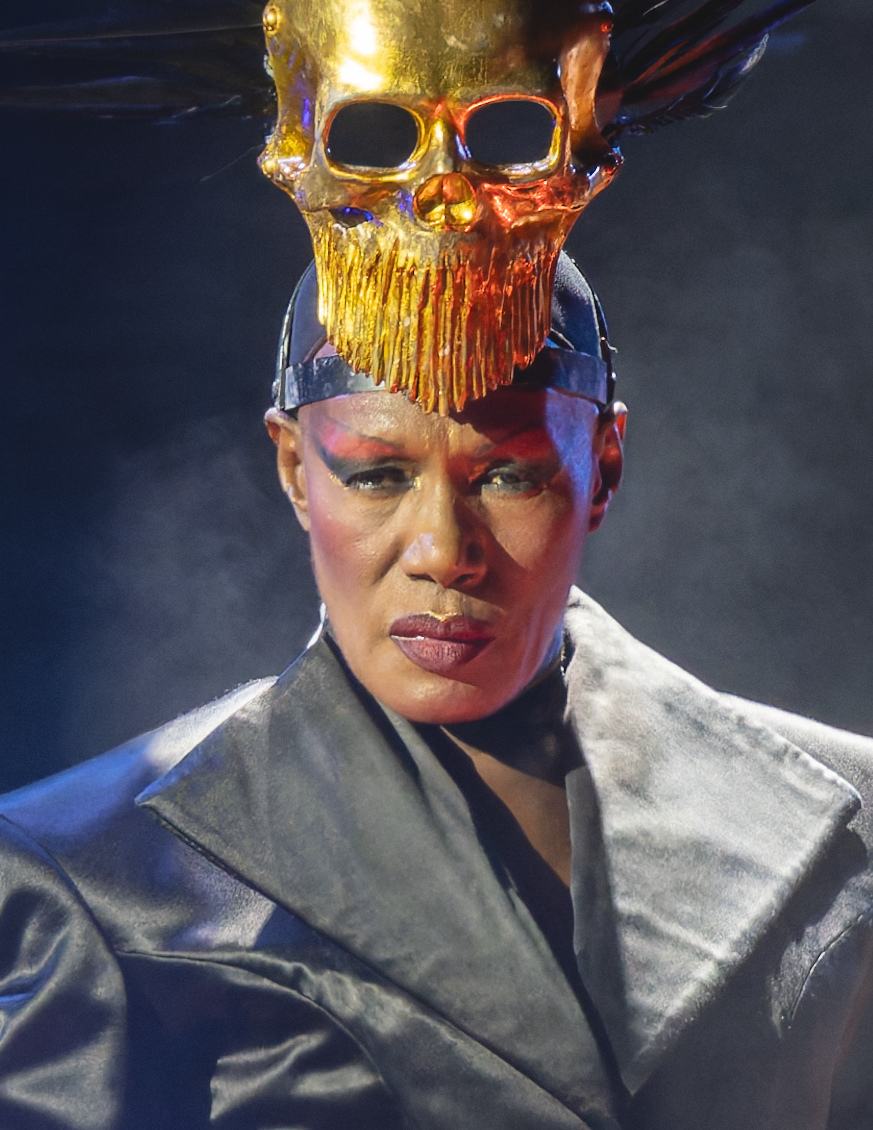
- Jones in 2024
- Born: Grace Beverly Jones; 19 May 1948 (age 78); Spanish Town, Saint Catherine, Crown Colony of Jamaica, British Empire
- Other name: Grace Mendoza
- Citizenship: Jamaica; United States
- Education: Onondaga Community College
- Occupations: Singer; songwriter; model; actress
- Years active: 1970–present
- Works: Discography
- Spouse: Atila Altaunbay (m. 1996; div. 2004)
- Children: 1
- Relatives: Noel Jones (brother)
- Musical career
- Genres: R&B; disco; new wave; art pop; reggae; dance; club
- Instrument: Vocals
- Labels: Island; Manhattan; Capitol; Wall of Sound/PIAS
- Website: gracejones.com

Grace Beverly Jones (born 19 May 1948) is a Jamaican singer, songwriter, model and actress. She began her modelling career in New York, signing with Wilhelmina Models. After moving to Paris, she worked for fashion houses such as Yves St. Laurent and Kenzo, while appearing on the covers of Elle and Vogue Hommes. Jones was photographed by Helmut Newton, Guy Bourdin, and Hans Feurer, and emerged as one of the most prominent Black models of the 1970s. She earned recognition for her androgynous appearance and bold features, and has been cited as influential in early discussions of gender expression.

Beginning in 1977, Jones embarked on a music career, securing a record deal with Island Records and becoming associated with New York City's Studio 54-centered disco scene. During this time, she was often referred to in the media as "Disco Queen", with Jet dubbing her "the greatest of them all" in 1979. In the early 1980s, she moved toward a new wave style that drew on reggae, funk, post-punk, and pop music, frequently collaborating with both the graphic designer Jean-Paul Goude and the musical duo Sly & Robbie.

She scored Top 40 entries on the UK Singles Chart with "Private Life", "Pull Up to the Bumper", "Love Is the Drug", and "Slave to the Rhythm". In 1982, she released the music video collection A One Man Show, directed by Goude, which earned a nomination for Best Video Album at the 26th Annual Grammy Awards. Her albums include Warm Leatherette (1980), Nightclubbing (1981), and Slave to the Rhythm (1985). She later continued to collaborate with contemporary artists such as Gorillaz and Janelle Monáe, and received another Grammy nomination for her work as a featured artist on Renaissance (2022) by Beyoncé.

As an actress, Jones appeared in independent films before landing her first mainstream role as Zula in the fantasy-action film Conan the Destroyer (1984). She later appeared in the James Bond film A View to a Kill (1985) as May Day, and starred as a vampire in Vamp (1986), all of which earned her nominations for the Saturn Award for Best Supporting Actress. In 1992, Jones acted in the Eddie Murphy film Boomerang, and contributed music for the accompanying soundtrack.

Jones has been cited as an influence on numerous artists across music and fashion. She was ranked 82nd on VH1's 100 Greatest Women of Rock and Roll (1999), and received a Q Idol Award in 2008. In 2016, Billboard ranked her as the 40th greatest dance club artist of all time.

== Life and career ==
=== 1948–1973: Early life and modeling career ===
Grace Jones was born on May 19, 1948, in Spanish Town, Jamaica, to Marjorie (née Williams) (1927–2017) and Robert W. Jones (1925–2008), who was a local politician and Apostolic clergyman. The couple already had two children, and would go on to have four more. Robert and Marjorie moved to the East Coast of the United States, where Robert worked as an agricultural labourer until a spiritual experience during a suicide attempt inspired him to become a Pentecostal minister. While they were in the US, they left their children with Marjorie's mother and her new husband, Peart. Jones knew him as "Mas P" ('Master P') and later noted that she "absolutely hated him"; as a strict disciplinarian he regularly beat the children in his care, representing what Jones described as "serious abuse". She was raised into the family's Pentecostal faith, having to take part in prayer meetings and Bible readings every night. She initially attended the Pentecostal All Saints School, before being sent to a nearby public school. As a child, Jones was shy and had only one schoolfriend. She was teased by classmates for her "skinny frame", but she excelled at sports and found solace in the nature of Jamaica.

[My childhood] was all about the Bible and beatings. We were beaten for any little act of dissent, and hit harder the worse the disobedience. It formed me as a person, my choices, men I have been attracted to... It was a profoundly disciplined, militant upbringing, and so in my own way, I am very militant and disciplined. Even if that sometimes means being militantly naughty, and disciplined in the arts of subversion.

— Grace Jones, 2015

Marjorie and Robert eventually brought their children – including the 13-year-old Grace – to live with them in the US, where they had settled in Lyncourt, Salina, New York, near Syracuse. It was in the city that her father had established his own ministry, the Apostolic Church of Jesus Christ, in 1956. Jones continued her schooling and after she graduated, enrolled at Onondaga Community College majoring in Spanish. Jones began to rebel against her parents and their religion; she began wearing makeup, drinking alcohol, and visiting gay clubs with her brother. At college, she also took a theatre class, with her drama teacher convincing her to join him on a summer stock tour in Philadelphia. Arriving in the city, she decided to stay there, immersing herself in the Counterculture of the 1960s by living in hippie communes, earning money as a go-go dancer, and using LSD and other drugs. She later praised the use of LSD as "a very important part of my emotional growth ... The mental exercise was good for me".

She moved back to New York at 18 and signed on as a model with Wilhelmina Models. She moved to Paris in 1970. The Parisian fashion scene was receptive to Jones's unusual, androgynous, bold, dark-skinned appearance. Yves St. Laurent, Claude Montana, and Kenzo Takada hired her for runway modelling, and she appeared on the covers of Elle, Vogue Hommes, and Stern working with Helmut Newton, Guy Bourdin, and Hans Feurer. Jones also modelled for Azzedine Alaia, and was frequently photographed promoting his line. While modelling in Paris, she met Jerry Hall and Jessica Lange. Hall and Jones frequented Le Sept, one of Paris's most popular gay clubs of the 1970s and 1980s, and socialised with Giorgio Armani and Karl Lagerfeld. In 1973, Jones appeared on the cover of a reissue of Billy Paul's 1970 album Ebony Woman.

=== 1974–1979: Transition to music and early releases ===
Jones was signed by Island Records, who put her in the studio with disco record producer Tom Moulton. Moulton worked at Sigma Sound Studios in Philadelphia, and Portfolio, was released in 1977. The album featured three songs from Broadway musicals, "Send in the Clowns" by Stephen Sondheim from A Little Night Music, "What I Did for Love" from A Chorus Line and "Tomorrow" from Annie. The second side of the album opens up with a seven-minute reinterpretation of Édith Piaf's "La Vie en rose" followed by three new recordings, two of which were co-written by Jones, "Sorry", and "That's the Trouble". The album finished with "I Need a Man", Jones's first club hit. The artwork to the album was designed by Richard Bernstein, an artist for Interview.

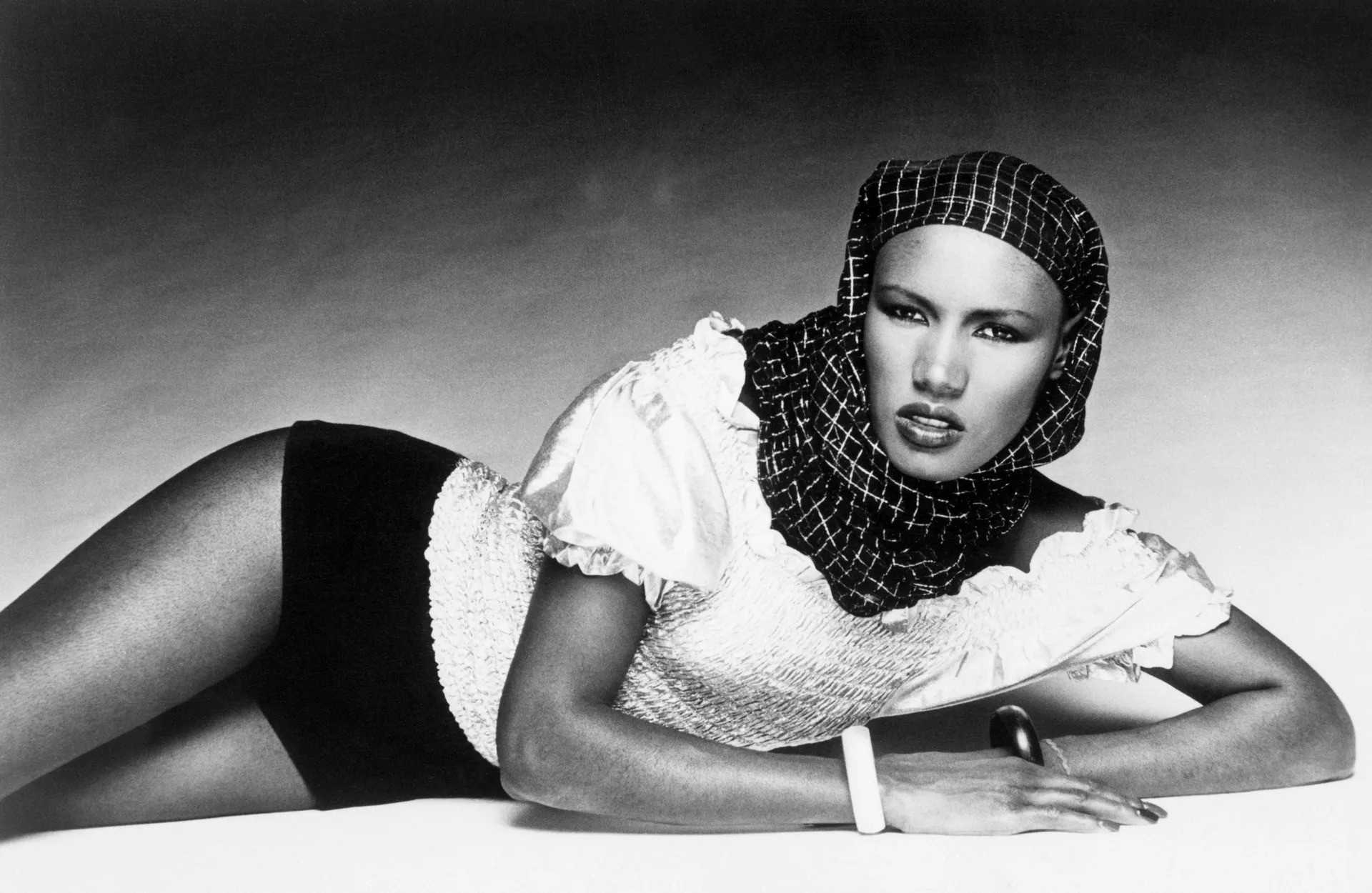
Jones in a 1977 publicity photo for her album Portfolio

In 1978, Jones and Moulton made Fame, an immediate follow-up to Portfolio, also recorded at Sigma Sound Studios. The album featured another reinterpretation of a French classic, "Autumn Leaves" by Jacques Prévert. The Canadian edition of the vinyl album included another French-language track, "Comme un oiseau qui s'envole", which replaced "All on a Summers Night"; in most locations this song served as the B-side of the single "Do or Die". In the North American club scene, Fame was a hit album and the "Do or Die"/"Pride"/"Fame" side reached top 10 on both the US Hot Dance Club Play and Canadian Dance/Urban charts. The album was released on compact disc in the early 1990s, but soon went out of print. In 2011, it was released and remastered by Gold Legion, a record company that specialises in reissuing classic disco albums on CD.

Jones's live shows were highly sexualized and flamboyant, leading her to be called "Queen of the Gay Discos". In the same year she was cast in the highly controversial Italian TV program Stryx, aired by Rai 2, where she portrayed the character of Rumstryx.

Muse was the last of Jones's disco albums. The album features a re-recorded version "I'll Find My Way to You", which Jones released three years prior to Muse. Originally appearing in the 1976 Italian film, Colt 38 Special Squad in which Jones had a role as a club singer, Jones also recorded a song called "Again and Again" that was featured in the film. Both songs were produced by composer Stelvio Cipriani. Icelandic keyboardist Thor Baldursson arranged most of the album and also sang duet with Jones on the track "Suffer". Like the last two albums, the cover art is by Richard Bernstein. Like Fame, Muse was later released by Gold Legion.

=== 1980–1985: Breakthrough, Nightclubbing, and acting ===
With anti-disco sentiment spreading, and with the aid of the Compass Point All Stars, Jones transitioned into new wave music with the 1980 release of Warm Leatherette. The album included covers of songs by The Normal ("Warm Leatherette"), The Pretenders ("Private Life"), Roxy Music ("Love Is the Drug"), Smokey Robinson ("The Hunter Gets Captured by the Game"), Tom Petty and the Heartbreakers ("Breakdown") and Jacques Higelin ("Pars"). Sly Dunbar revealed that the title track was also the first to be recorded with Jones. Tom Petty wrote the lyrics to "Breakdown", and he also wrote the third verse of Jones's reinterpretation. The album included one song co-written by Jones, "A Rolling Stone". Originally, "Pull Up to the Bumper" was to be included on the album, but its R&B sound did not fit with the rest of the material. By 1981, she had begun collaborating with photographer and graphic designer Jean-Paul Goude, with whom she also had a relationship. An extended version of "Private Life" was released as a single, with a cover of the Joy Division song "She's Lost Control", a non-album track, as the B-side.

The 1981 release of Nightclubbing included Jones's covers of songs by Flash and the Pan ("Walking in the Rain"), Bill Withers ("Use Me"), Iggy Pop/David Bowie ("Nightclubbing") and Ástor Piazzolla ("I've Seen That Face Before"). Three songs were co-written by Jones: "Feel Up", "Art Groupie" and "Pull Up to the Bumper". Sting wrote "Demolition Man"; he later recorded it with The Police on the album Ghost in the Machine. "I've Done It Again" was written by Marianne Faithfull. The strong rhythm featured on Nightclubbing was produced by Compass Point All Stars, including Sly and Robbie, Wally Badarou, Mikey Chung, Uziah "Sticky" Thompson and Barry Reynolds. The album entered in the Top 5 in four countries, and became Jones's highest-ranking record on the US Billboard mainstream albums and R&B charts.

Nightclubbing claimed the number 1 slot on NME's Album of the Year list. Slant Magazine listed the album at No. 40 on its list of Best Albums of the 1980s. Nightclubbing is now widely considered Jones's best studio album. The album's cover art is a painting of Jones by Jean-Paul Goude. Jones is presented as a man wearing an Armani suit jacket, with a cigarette in her mouth and a flattop haircut. While promoting the album, Jones slapped chat-show host Russell Harty live on air after he had turned to interview other guests, making Jones feel she was being ignored.

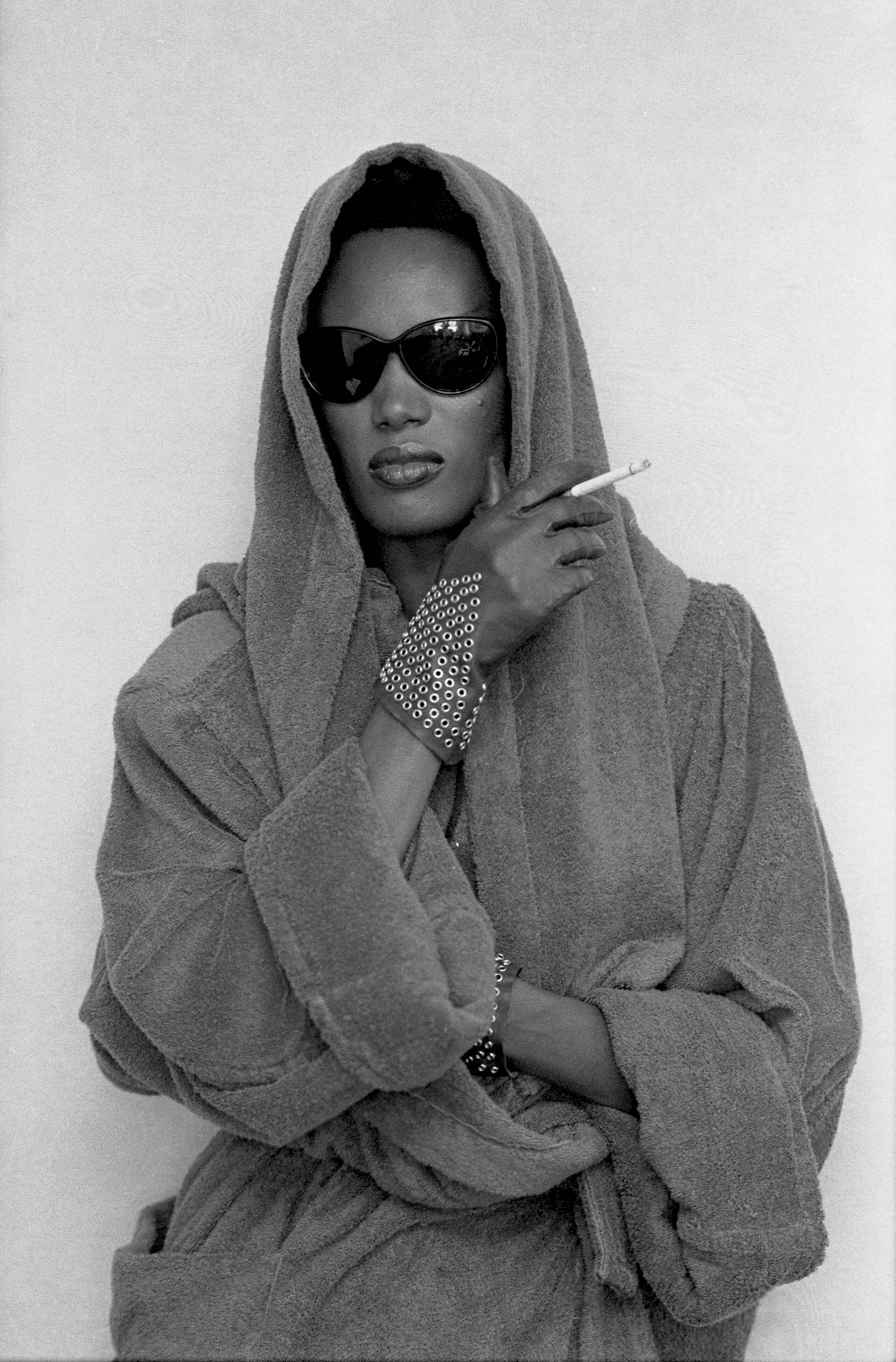
Jones in Los Angeles, 1984

Having already recorded two reggae-oriented albums under the production of Compass Point All Stars, Jones went to Nassau, Bahamas in 1982 and recorded Living My Life; the album resulted in Jones's final contribution to the Compass Point trilogy, with only one cover, Melvin Van Peebles's "The Apple Stretching". The rest were original songs; "Nipple to the Bottle" was co-written with Sly Dunbar, and, apart from "My Jamaican Guy", the other tracks were collaborations with Barry Reynolds. Despite receiving a limited single release, the title track was left off the album. Further session outtakes included "Man Around the House" (Jones, Reynolds) and a cover of "Ring of Fire", written by June Carter Cash and Merle Kilgore and popularized by Johnny Cash, both of which were included on the 1998 compilation Private Life: The Compass Point Sessions. The album's cover art resulted from another Jones/Goude collaboration; the artwork has been described as being as famous as the music on the record. It features Jones's disembodied head cut out from a photograph and pasted onto a white background. Jones's head is sharpened, giving her head and face an angular shape. A piece of plaster is pasted over her left eyebrow, and her forehead is covered with drops of sweat.

Jones's three albums under the production of the Compass Point All Stars resulted in Jones's One Man Show, a performance art/pop theatre presentation devised by Goude and Jones in which she also performed tracks from the albums Portfolio ("La Vie en rose"), Warm Leatherette, ("Private Life", "Warm Leatherette"), Nightclubbing ("Walking in the Rain", "Feel Up", "Demolition Man", "Pull Up to the Bumper" and "I've Seen That Face Before (Libertango)") and from Living My Life, "My Jamaican Guy" and the album's title track. Jones dressed in elaborate costumes and masks (in the opening sequence as a gorilla) and alongside a series of Grace Jones lookalikes. A video version, filmed live in London and New York City and completed with some studio footage, was nominated for a Grammy Award for Best Long-Form Music Video the following year.

After the release of Living My Life, Jones took on the role of Zula the Amazonian in Conan the Destroyer (1984) and was nominated for a Saturn Award for Best Supporting Actress. In 1985, Jones starred as May Day, henchwoman to main antagonist Max Zorin in the 14th James Bond film A View to a Kill; Jones was also nominated for a Saturn Award for Best Supporting Actress. That same year, she was featured on the Arcadia song "Election Day". Jones was among the many stars to promote the Honda Scooter; other artists included Lou Reed, Adam Ant, and Miles Davis. Jones also posed nude for Playboy, with her boyfriend Dolph Lundgren.

=== 1986–1989: Slave to the Rhythm, Island Life, and further films ===
After Jones's success as a mainstream actress, she returned to the studio to work on Slave to the Rhythm, the last of her recordings for Island. Bruce Woolley, Simon Darlow, Stephen Lipson and Trevor Horn wrote the material, and it was produced by Horn and Lipson. It was a concept album that featured several interpretations of the title track. The project was originally intended for Frankie Goes to Hollywood as a follow-up to "Relax", but was given to Jones. All eight tracks on the album featured excerpts from a conversation with Jones, speaking about many aspects of her life. The interview was conducted by journalist Paul Morley. The album features voice-overs from actor Ian McShane reciting passages from Jean-Paul Goude's biography Jungle Fever. Slave to the Rhythm was successful in German-speaking countries and in the Netherlands, where it secured Top 10 placings. It reached number 12 on the UK Albums Chart in November 1985 and became the second-highest-ranking album released by Jones. Jones earned an MTV Video Music Award nomination for the title track's music video.

After her success with Slave to the Rhythm, Island released Island Life, Jones's first best-of compilation, which featured songs from most of her releases with Island (Portfolio, Fame, Warm Leatherette, Nightclubbing, Living My Life and Slave to the Rhythm). American writer and journalist Glenn O'Brien wrote the essay for the inlay booklet. The compilation charted in the UK, New Zealand and the United States. The artwork on the cover of the compilation was of another Jones/Goude collaboration; it featured Jones's celestial body in a montage of separate images, following Goude's ideas on creating credible illusions with his cut-and-paint technique. The body position is anatomically impossible.

The artwork, a piece called "Nigger Arabesque", was originally published in the New York magazine in 1978, and was used as a backdrop for the music video of Jones's hit single "La Vie en rose". The artwork has been described as "one of pop culture's most famous photographs". The image was also parodied in Nicki Minaj's 2011 music video for "Stupid Hoe", in which Minaj mimicked the pose.

After Slave to the Rhythm and Island Life, Jones started to record again under a new contract with Manhattan Records, which resulted in Inside Story, Jones teamed up with music producer Nile Rodgers of Chic, whom Jones had previously tried to work with during the disco era. The album was recorded at Skyline Studios in New York and post-produced at Atlantic Studios and Sterling Sound. Inside Story was the first album Jones produced, which resulted in heated disputes with Rodgers. Musically, the album was more accessible than her previous albums with the Compass Point All Stars, and explored different styles of pop music, with undertones of jazz, gospel, and Caribbean sounds. All songs on the album were written by Jones and Bruce Woolley. Richard Bernstein teamed up with Jones again to provide the album's artwork. Inside Story made the top 40 in several European countries. The album was Jones's last entry to date on US Billboard 200 albums chart. The same year, Jones starred as Katrina, an Egyptian queen vampire in the vampire film Vamp. For her work in the film, Jones was awarded a Saturn Award for Best Supporting Actress.

In 1987, Jones appeared in two films, Straight to Hell, and Mary Lambert's Siesta, for which Jones was nominated for Golden Raspberry Award for Worst Supporting Actress. Bulletproof Heart was released in 1989, produced by Chris Stanley, who co-wrote, and co-produced the majority of the songs, and was featured as a guest vocalist on "Don't Cry Freedom". Robert Clivillés and David Cole of C+C Music Factory produced some tracks on the album.

=== 1990–2004: Boomerang, soundtracks, and collaborations ===
In 1990, Jones appeared as herself in the documentary, Superstar: The Life and Times of Andy Warhol. 1992 saw Jones starring as Helen Strangé, in the Eddie Murphy film Boomerang, for which she also contributed the song "7 Day Weekend" to its soundtrack. Jones released two more soundtrack songs in 1992; "Evilmainya", recorded for the film Freddie as F.R.O.7, and "Let Joy and Innocence Prevail" for the film Toys. In 1994, she was due to release an electro album titled Black Marilyn with artwork featuring the singer as Marilyn Monroe. "Sex Drive" was released as the first single in September 1993, but the album was shelved due to Jones disliking the mixes that were presented by producers, whom she felt were primarily interested in sampling and had "minced" her vocals. Jones stated that the experience turned her off working on music. The track "Volunteer", recorded during the same sessions, leaked in 2009. In 1995, Jones reunited with Tom Moulton for a disco-house take on Candi Staton's 1978 song "Victim", however, the song's release was cancelled by Island Records.

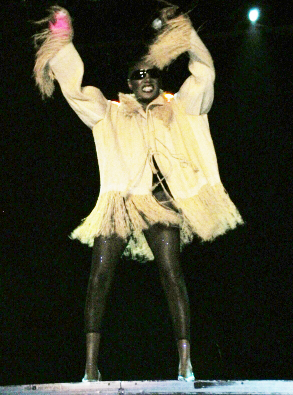
Jones performing in 2007

In 1996, Jones released "Love Bites", an up-tempo electronic track to promote the Sci-Fi Channel's Vampire Week, which consisted of a series of vampire-themed films aired on the channel in early November 1996. The track features Jones singing from the perspective of a vampire. The track was released as a non-label promo-only single. As of 2013, it had not been made commercially available.

In June 1998, Jones was scheduled to release an album titled Force of Nature, on which she worked with trip hop musician Tricky. The release of Force of Nature was cancelled due to a disagreement between the two, and only a white label 12" single featuring two dance mixes of "Hurricane" was issued at the time; a slowed-down version of this song became the title track of her comeback album released ten years later while another unreleased track from the album, "Clandestine Affair" (recycling the chorus from her unreleased 1993 track "Volunteer"), appeared on a bootleg 12" in 2004. Jones recorded the track "Storm" in 1998 for the film The Avengers, and in 1999, appeared in an episode of the Beastmaster television series as the Umpatra Warrior.

The same year, Jones recorded "The Perfect Crime", an up-tempo song for Danish TV written by the composer duo Floppy M. aka Jacob Duus and Kåre Jacobsen. In 2000, Jones collaborated with rapper Lil' Kim, appearing on the song "Revolution" from her album The Notorious K.I.M.. In 2001, Jones starred in the film, Wolf Girl (also known as Blood Moon), as an intersex circus performer named Christoph/Christine. In 2002, Jones joined Luciano Pavarotti on stage for his annual Pavarotti and Friends fundraiser concert to support the United Nations refugee agency's programs for Angolan refugees in Zambia. In November 2004, Jones sang "Slave to the Rhythm" at a tribute concert for record producer Trevor Horn at London's Wembley Arena.

=== 2008–2015: Hurricane and memoir ===
Despite several comeback attempts throughout the 1990s, Jones's next full-length record was released almost twenty years later, after Jones decided "never to do an album again," changing her mind after meeting music producer Ivor Guest through a mutual friend, milliner Philip Treacy. After the two became acquainted, Guest let Jones listen to a track he had been working on, which became "Devil in My Life", once Jones set the lyrics to the song. The lyrics to the song were written after a party in Venice.

The two ended up with 23 tracks. The album, Hurricane, included autobiographical songs, such as "This Is", "Williams' Blood" and "I'm Crying (Mother's Tears)", an ode to her mother Marjorie. "Love You to Life" was another track based on real events and "Corporate Cannibal" referred to corporate capitalism. "Well Well Well" was recorded in memory of Alex Sadkin, member of Compass Point All Stars who had died in a motor accident 1987. "Sunset Sunrise" was written by Jones's son, Paulo; the song ponders the relationship between mankind and mother nature. Four songs were removed from the album, "The Key to Funky", "Body Phenomenon", "Sister Sister" and "Misery". For the production of the album, Jones teamed up with Sly and Robbie, Wally Badarou, Barry Reynolds, Mikey Chung, and Uziah "Sticky" Thompson, of the Compass Point All Stars, with contributions from trip-hop artist Tricky, and Brian Eno.

The album was released on Wall of Sound on 3 November 2008, in the United Kingdom. PIAS, the umbrella company of Wall of Sound, distributed Hurricane worldwide excluding North America. The album scored 72 out of 100 on review aggregator Metacritic. Prior to the album's release, Jones performed at Massive Attack's Meltdown festival in London on 19 June 2008, Jones performed four new songs from the album and premiered the music video which Jones and artist Nick Hooker collaborated on, which resulted in "Corporate Cannibal". Jones promoted the album even further by appearing on talk show Friday Night with Jonathan Ross, performed at several awards galas, and embarked on The Hurricane Tour. The same year, Jones was honoured with Q Idol Award.

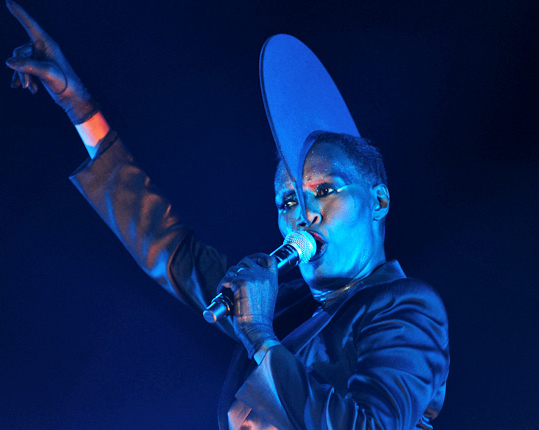
Jones performing in 2011

In 2009, Chris Cunningham produced a fashion shoot for Dazed & Confused using Jones as a model to create "Nubian versions" of Rubber Johnny. In an interview for BBC's The Culture Show, it was suggested that the collaboration may expand into a video project. Jones also worked with the avant-garde poet Brigitte Fontaine on a duet named "Soufi" from Fontaine's album Prohibition released in 2009, and produced by Ivor Guest.

In March 2010, Jones performed for guests at the 18th annual Elton John AIDS Foundation Academy Award Viewing Party. The Elton John AIDS Foundation is one of the world's leading nonprofit organisations supporting HIV prevention programs, and works to eliminate the stigma and discrimination associated with HIV/AIDS. The event raised US$3.7 million. The same year, a budget DVD version of A One Man Show was released, as Grace Jones – Live in Concert. It included three bonus video clips ("Slave to the Rhythm", "Love Is the Drug" and "Crush").

In 2011, Jones collaborated again with Brigitte Fontaine on two tracks from her release entitled L'un n'empêche pas l'autre and performed at the opening ceremony of the 61st FIFA Congress. Jones released a dub version of the album, Hurricane – Dub, which came out on 5 September 2011. The dub versions were made by Ivor Guest, with contributions from Adam Green, Frank Byng, Robert Logan and Ben Cowan.

In April 2012, Jones joined Deborah Harry, Bebel Gilberto, and Sharon Stone at the Inspiration Gala in São Paulo, Brazil, raising $1.3 million for amfAR (the Foundation for AIDS Research). Jones closed the evening with a performance of "La Vie en Rose" and "Pull Up to the Bumper". Two months later, Jones performed "Slave to the Rhythm" at the Diamond Jubilee of Elizabeth II (whilst keeping a hula hoop spinning round her waist throughout), and the Lovebox Festival. On 27 October 2012, Jones performed her only North American show of 2012, a performance at New York City's Roseland Ballroom. The same year, Jones presented Sir Tom Jones with not only the GQ Men of the Year award, but her underwear. Tom Jones accepted the gift in good humour, and replied by saying, "I didn't think you wore any".

Universal Music Group released a deluxe edition of her Nightclubbing album as a two-disc set and Blu-ray audio on 28 April 2014. The set contains most of the 12" mixes of singles from that album, plus two previously unreleased tracks from the Nightclubbing sessions, including a cover of the Gary Numan track "Me! I Disconnect from You".

In October 2014, Jones was announced as having contributed a song, "Original Beast", to the soundtrack of The Hunger Games: Mockingjay – Part 1.

Jones's memoir entitled I'll Never Write My Memoirs was released on 29 September 2015.

=== 2017–present: Collaborations and festivals ===
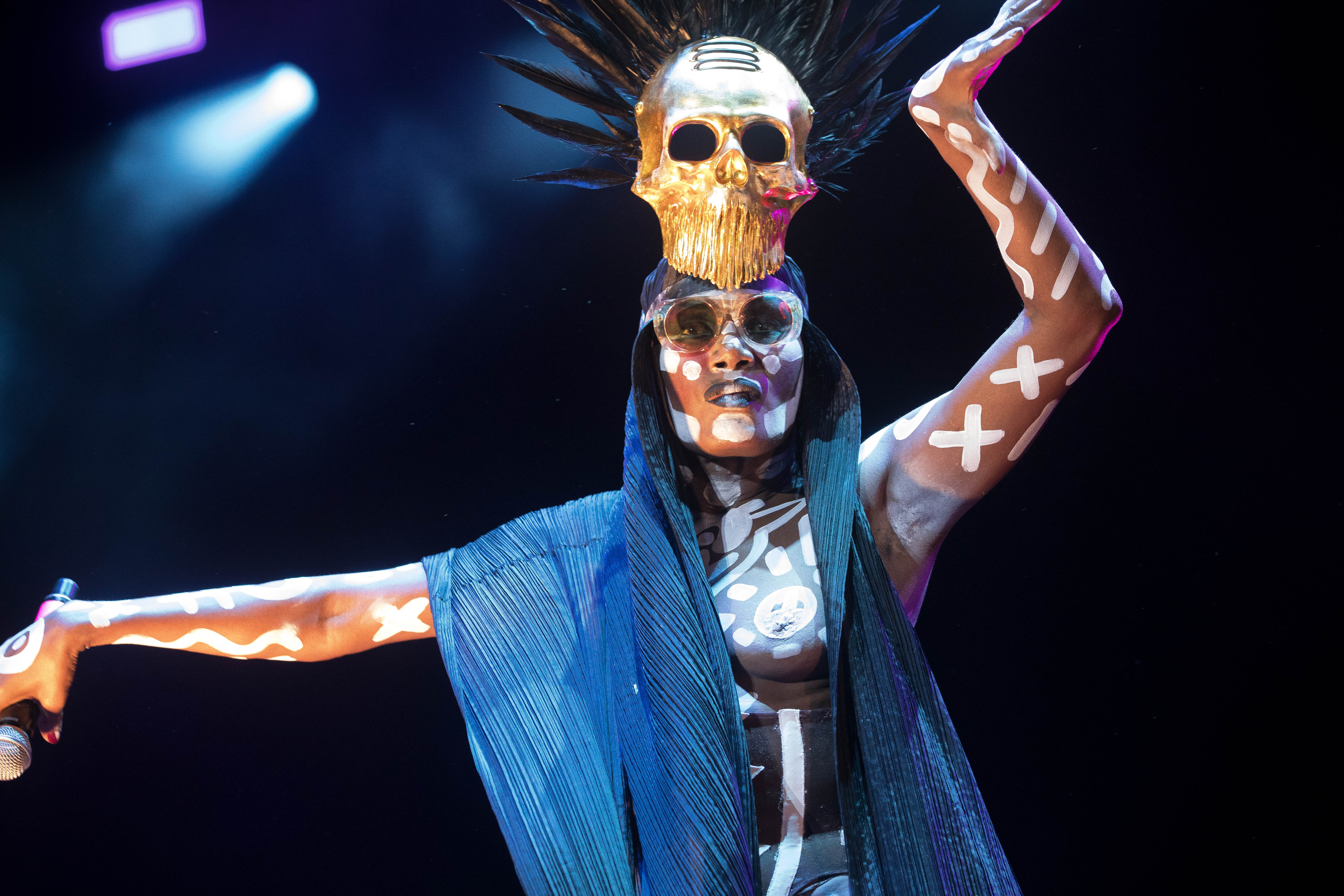
Jones performing in 2018

In 2017, Jones collaborated with British virtual band Gorillaz, appearing on the song "Charger" from their fifth studio album Humanz. In October 2018, Jones received the Order of Jamaica from the Jamaican government.

In June 2022, Jones served as curator of the 27th edition of the Meltdown Festival, the UK's longest-running artist-curated music festival. Jones had been announced as the curator already for the 2020 festival, but due to the COVID-19 pandemic it was rescheduled to 2022. During her show that closed the festival, Jones announced that a brand new 'African hybrid' record was in production, and previewed "The Sun Shines in Wartime" (or "Sunshine In Wartime) and "Blacker Than Black" (or "Born Black") from the album. Jones provided guest vocals on Beyoncé's song "Move" from her seventh studio album Renaissance, released in July 2022.

On 14 November 2022, music festival Camp Bestival announced their 2023 lineup, which included Jones, alongside Primal Scream, Melanie C, Craig David, The Kooks, the Human League, and others. On 23 July 2023, Jones headlined the music acts at Bluedot Festival.

== Artistry and influence ==
=== Image ===
"Grace was very open. We worked together to create this intimidating character. I mean, she's naturally intimidating anyway with her body shape, very straight neck, prominent cheekbones, and clean-cut jawline. She's feminine, no doubt about that, but I've always thought that she was far more beautiful without the artifices she employed to make herself more feminine. I tried to emphasize that body shape through a sort of minimalist German expressionism, with its games of shadows and its angular shapes. Grace is from Jamaica, so she speaks English in a quite thought-out way. I also advised her to address her audience – mostly composed of homosexuals – like a teacher would, with severity. All of that stuff contributed to the building of her image."

— Jean-Paul Goude, Vice, 2012.

Jones's "appearance was equally divisive" as the sonic fluidity of her music – with her "striking visuals [leading] to her becoming a muse for the likes of Issey Miyake and Thierry Mugler. Her image has been described as "neo-cubist". Jones's distinctive androgynous appearance, square-cut, angular padded clothing, manner, and height of 179 cm (5' 10 1/2") influenced the cross-dressing movement of the 1980s. To this day, she is known for her unique look at least as much as she is for her music and has been an inspiration for numerous artists, including Annie Lennox, Lorde, Lady Gaga, Rihanna, Janelle Monáe, and Nile Rodgers. Jones was listed as one of the 50 best-dressed over 50 by The Guardian in March 2013.

Kyle Munzenrieder of W magazine wrote that "everyone from Madonna to Björk to Beyoncé to Lady Gaga has taken more than a few pages from her playbook". Jones's work is often discussed for its visual aspect, which was largely the work of French illustrator, photographer, and graphic designer Jean-Paul Goude. According to Jake Hall of i-D, "their collaborative work [went on] to define the visual landscape of the 70s and 80s," and Goude "helped create one of the most intriguing legends in musical history." Goude saw Jones as his muse, declaring she was "beautiful and grotesque at the same time," and dated her from 1977 to 1984. He "[designed her] album covers, [...] directed her music videos, choreographed live performances, and helped develop her image."

Jones was featured prominently in Goude's work from that period, "which, over the course of the '80s, became increasingly synonymous with willful distortion"—using a technique he refers to as "French correction". The artist stated in 2012: "chopping up photos and rearranging them in a montage to elongate limbs or exaggerate the size of someone's head or some other aspect appealed to me on a lot of levels – I'm always searching for equilibrium, symmetry, and rhythm in an image." Goude's work "centers around artistic depictions of race, ethnicity, and global culture", with an "enchantment with the far-away and the exotic". As a result, much of his depictions of black women are considered controversial and exploitative, as Jones was presented as "a white man's rendition of the African feminine." Goude's images depicted her hypersexualized and androgynous, emphasizing her "blackness" and Jamaican heritage. Writer Abigail Gardner felt Jones's body "was presented and manipulated in ways that are clearly congruent with conceiving of that display as artefactual." Essentially, Hall writes, "Goude treated Jones as an artistic vehicle first and foremost—a hyperbole which, despite destroying their personal relationship, allowed Goude to translate his grandiose vision of Jones the phenomenon into a series of imagery which painted her as a surreal, impossible muse."

It has been noted that Jones's ties with the 1970s and 1980s New York art scene are important in understanding her visual identity during this period, and she was close to Andy Warhol, who created a number of paintings and other works of the singer. She also knew artist Richard Bernstein, and artist and social activist Keith Haring, who painted her head-to-toe for a series of photographs taken by Robert Mapplethorpe and for her role in the 1986 film Vamp.

In 2020, the first ever art exhibition centred around Jones was presented at Nottingham Contemporary in the United Kingdom, in an attempt to represent "a multi-faceted pop culture icon while trying to reformulate an alternative image of Grace Jones that does not fall into clichés."

=== Music ===
Vice described Jones's musical output as "weird, vibrant and progressive," stating that she "has woven disco, new wave, post-punk, art pop, industrial, reggae, and gospel into a tight sound that is distinctly hers, threaded together with lilting, powerful vocals." Her early music was rooted in disco. She opted for a new wave sound in the early 1980s. She recorded a series of albums (1980's Warm Leatherette through 1982's Living My Life) backed by the Jamaica rhythm section duo Sly and Robbie. Her music during this era was described as a new wave hybrid of reggae, funk, pop, and rock. According to John Doran of BBC Music, Warm Leatherette and Nightclubbing were "post-punk pop" albums that, "delved into the worlds of disco, reggae and funk much more successfully than most of her 'alternative' contemporaries, while still retaining a blank-eyed alienation that was more reminiscent of David Bowie or Ian Curtis than most of her peers." OMD frontman Andy McCluskey stated, "Grace's albums were the soundtracks of our early 80s tours."

Jones has a contralto vocal range. She sings in two modes: either in her monotone speak-sing voice as in songs such as "Private Life", "Walking in the Rain" and "The Apple Stretching", or in an almost-soprano mode in songs such as "La Vie en Rose", "Slave to the Rhythm", and "Victor Should Have Been a Jazz Musician".

== Personal life ==
Jones's father, Bishop Robert W. Jones, was strict and their relationship was strained. According to his particular denomination's beliefs, one should only use one's singing ability to glorify God. He died on 7 May 2008. Her mother, Marjorie, always supported Jones's career (she sings on "Williams' Blood" and "My Jamaican Guy") but could not be publicly associated with her music. Marjorie's father, John Williams, was also a musician and played with Nat King Cole.

Jones described her childhood as having been "crushed underneath the Bible", and since has refused to enter a Jamaican church due to her bad childhood experiences.

Jones used the surname "Mendoza" in her 20s, so that her parents would not know that she was working as a go-go dancer.

Through her relationship with longtime collaborator Jean-Paul Goude, Jones has one son, Paulo, born 12 November 1979. From Paulo, Jones has one granddaughter. Jones married Atila Altaunbay in 1996. She disputes rumors that she married Chris Stanley in her 2015 memoir I'll Never Write My Memoirs, saying, "The truth is, I only ever married one of my boyfriends, Atila Altaunbay, a Muslim from Turkey." She spent four years with Swedish actor Dolph Lundgren, her former bodyguard; she got him a part as a KGB officer in A View to a Kill (1985). Jones started dating Danish actor and stuntman Sven-Ole Thorsen in 1990, and was in an open relationship as of 2007.

Jones's brother is megachurch preacher Bishop Noel Jones, who starred on the 2013 reality show Preachers of LA.

== Discography ==
- Portfolio (1977)
- Fame (1978)
- Muse (1979)
- Warm Leatherette (1980)
- Nightclubbing (1981)
- Living My Life (1982)
- Slave to the Rhythm (1985)
- Inside Story (1986)
- Bulletproof Heart (1989)
- Hurricane (2008)

== Tours ==
- A One Man Show (1981)
- Grace in Your Face (1990)
- Hurricane Tour (2009)

== Filmography ==
As actress
Year	Title	Role	Notes
1973	Gordon's War	Mary	
1976	Attention les yeux!	Cuidy	
1976	Quelli della Calibro 38	Club Singer	Uncredited
1978	Stryx	Rumstryx	TV series
1981	Deadly Vengeance	Slick's girlfriend	
1984	Conan the Destroyer	Zula	
1985	A View to a Kill	May Day	
1986	Vamp	Katrina	
1987	Straight to Hell	Sonya	
1987	Siesta	Conchita	
1992	Boomerang	Helen Strangé	
1992	Freddie as F.R.O.7	Messina (singing voice)	
1995	Cyber Bandits	Masako Yokohama	
1998	McCinsey's Island	Alanso Richter	
1998	Palmer's Pick Up	Ms. Remo	
1999	BeastMaster	Nokinja	Episode: "The Umpatra"
2001	Wolf Girl	Christoph/Christine	
2001	Shaka Zulu: The Citadel	The Queen	TV movie
2006	No Place Like Home	Dancer	
2008	Falco – Verdammt, wir leben noch!	Waitress	
2008	Chelsea on the Rocks	Bev	
2016	Gutterdämmerung	Death / The Devil	

Video games
Year	Title	Role	Notes
1994	Hell: A Cyberpunk Thriller	Solene Solux	

Stage work
Year	Title	Role	Location
1997	The Wiz	Evillene	US Touring Revival

As musician
Year	Title	Notes
1982	A One Man Show	"Warm Leatherette" (intro includes excerpts from "Nightclubbing"), "Walking in the Rain", "Feel Up" "La Vie en rose", "Demolition Man", "Pull Up to the Bumper", "Private Life", "My Jamaican Guy", "Living My Life", "I've Seen That Face Before (Libertango)"
1983	The Video Singles	Includes the videos for "Pull Up to the Bumper", "Private Life" and "My Jamaican Guy", all directed by Jean-Paul Goude.
1988	Pee-wee's Playhouse Christmas Special (TV special)	Guest performer: reinterpretation of "The Little Drummer Boy"
2002	Pavarotti & Friends 2002 for Angola	Guest performer: "Pourquoi Me Réveiller" (feat. Luciano Pavarotti)
2005	So Far So Goude	DVD only available as a bonus with the purchase of Thames & Hudson's biography on Jean-Paul Goude
2010	Grace Jones – Live in NYC 1981	Remastered version of A One Man Show with 3 bonus music videos, "Slave to the Rhythm", "Love Is the Drug" and "Crush"
2012	The Diamond Jubilee Concert (TV special)	Guest performer: "Slave to the Rhythm"

Documentaries
Year	Title	Notes
1979	Army of Lovers or Revolution of the Perverts/ Armee der Liebenden oder Revolte der Perversen	
1984	Mode in France	
1990	Superstar: The Life and Times of Andy Warhol	
1996	In Search of Dracula with Jonathan Ross	
1998	Behind the Music – Studio 54	
2007	Queens of Disco	
2017	Grace Jones: Bloodlight and Bami	

== Awards and nominations ==
List of awards and nominations received by Grace Jones
Year	Awards	Work	Category	Result	Ref.
1977	Billboard Disco Awards	"Sorry / That's the Trouble"	Heavy Disco/Light Radio (Single of the Year)	Nominated	
1977	Billboard Disco Awards	"Sorry / That's the Trouble"	Disco DJ's Favorite 12" Disc	Nominated	
1977	Billboard Disco Awards	"I Need a Man"	Heavy Disco/Light Radio (Single of the Year)	Nominated	
1977	Billboard Disco Awards	"I Need a Man"	Disco DJ's Favorite 12" Disc	Nominated	
1977	Billboard Disco Awards	Herself	Most Promising Disco Artist of the Year	Won	
1977	Canadian Disco Awards	Herself	Most Promising International Female Vocalist	Nominated	
1983	Billboard Music Awards	Herself	Top Disco Artist - Female	Nominated	
1984	Grammy Awards	A One Man Show	Best Video Album	Nominated	
1985	Bravo Otto Awards	Herself	Best Female Actress (Silver)	Won	
1985	Saturn Awards	Conan the Destroyer	Best Supporting Actress	Nominated	
1986	Saturn Awards	A View to a Kill	Best Supporting Actress	Nominated	
1986	MTV Video Music Awards	"Slave to the Rhythm"	Best Female Video	Nominated	
1987	Saturn Awards	Vamp	Best Supporting Actress	Nominated	
1988	Golden Raspberry Awards	Siesta	Worst Supporting Actress	Nominated	
1999	Golden Raspberry Awards	"Storm"	Worst Original Song	Nominated	
2008	Q Awards	Herself	Q Icon	Won	
2008	UK Festival Awards	Herself (with The Specials)	Most Memorable Moment	Nominated	
2009	Helpmann Awards	Hurricane Tour	Best International Contemporary Music Concert	Nominated	
2009	RTHK International Pop Poll Awards	"Williams' Blood"	Top Ten International Gold Songs	Nominated	
2010	UK Festival Awards	Lovebox Festival	Best Headline Performance	Nominated	
2014	Rober Awards Music Poll	Nightclubbing	Best Reissue	Nominated	
2016	NME Awards	I'll Never Write My Memoirs	Best Book	Nominated	
2017	The Voice of a Woman Awards	Herself	Lifetime Achievement Award	Won	
2017	Bahamas International Film Festival	Herself	Career Achievement Award	Won	
2023	Grammy Awards	Renaissance	Album of the Year (as a featured artist)	Nominated	

== Bibliography ==
- Jones, Grace; Morley, Paul (2015). I'll Never Write My Memoirs. London: Simon & Schuster UK. ISBN 978-1-4711-3521-7.
