= Ivor Guest, 4th Viscount Wimborne =

British Grammy nominated record producer and Emmy Award nominated composer

Ivor Mervyn Vigors Guest, 4th Viscount Wimborne (born 19 September 1968) is a British Grammy Award nominated record producer and Emmy Award nominated composer.

== Early life and education ==
Lord Wimborne is the only son of Ivor Guest, 3rd Viscount Wimborne and his first wife Victoria Ann Vigors. He grew up between Paris and Ireland. He was educated at Eton. He succeeded to the viscountcy and other titles upon the death of his father in 1993.

== Music career ==
He is best known for his work with Grace Jones (Hurricane / "Hurricane Dub", 2011) and Brigitte Fontaine (Prohibition, 2009 / L'un n'empêche pas l'autre, 2011) and John Grant (The Art of the Lie, 2024).

During his career, he has worked with Sly and Robbie, Tony Allen, Brigitte Fontaine, Areski Belkacem, Brian Eno, Grace Jones, Barry Reynolds, Atticus Ross, Tim Simenon, John Grant, Robert Logan, Dave Okumu, Wally Badarou, Jessie Ware, Skye Edwards, Beyoncé and Lana Del Rey. He has also worked on tracks with French artists such as Jacques Higelin, M, Christophe, Bertrand Cantat, Arno, Alain Souchon, Philippe Katerine, and Emmanuelle Seigner with Brigitte Fontaine.

He received a Grammy nomination for his work on Beyoncé’s Renaissance album in 2022.

His film credits as composer include the Oscar-winning documentary Taxi to the Dark Side (Dir. Alex Gibney), Mea Maxima Culpa: Silence in the House of God (Dir. Alex Gibney), for which he was Emmy nominated, Citizen K (Dir. Alex Gibney), the Oscar short-listed Semper Fi- Always Faithful, Nick Love's film "Goodbye Charlie Bright", and the British cult movie The Football Factory, also a film by Nick Love. He generally works with Robert Logan on scores.

In November 2014, he produced and co-wrote the Grace Jones track "Original Beast", featured on the Lorde curated soundtrack album for The Hunger Games: Mockingjay – Part 1 movie.

He is the musical director of Grace Jones' live band and show, and of the live performance sequences in the Sophie Fiennes directed Bloodlight and Bami.

In 2024 Guest produced the John Grant album The Art of the Lie

== Land ownership and management ==
In the non-musical sphere, Guest has an interest in ecology and habitat regeneration, and has been responsible for the planting of over 4 million trees in the UK, as well as encouraging responsible management practice in ecologically sensitive areas. He was an early adopter of Socially Responsible Investment practices. Alan Brown has suggested that he may be the beneficial owner of the 21,000 acre Craiganour Estate in Highland Perthshire, Scotland. He has a long-term association with US artist James Turrell, and has constructed a Skyspace by the artist on his land, as well as having one of Turrell's Space Division pieces named after him- 'Ivor Blue.'

== Marriage and children ==
Lord Wimborne married Ieva Imsa in 2011. They have a daughter and a son:

- Hon. Greta Charlotte Eve Revel Guest (born 2011).
- Hon. Ivor Guest (born 2016), heir apparent to the viscountcy.

== Arms ==
Coat of arms of Ivor Guest, 4th Viscount Wimborne

Coronet
A Coronet of a Viscount
Crest
A Swan's Head erased proper gorged with a Collar Or and charged underneath with a Cross Moline as in the Arms between two Ostrich Feathers Or
Escutcheon
Azure on a Chevron Or between three Swan's Heads erased proper as many Crosses Moline Sable
Supporters
On either side a Figure habited as Vulcan resting his exterior hand on an Anvil and holding in front thereof a Sledge Hammer all proper
Motto
Ferro Non Gladio (By iron, not by the sword)

Peerage of the United Kingdom
Preceded by Ivor Fox-Strangways Guest	Viscount Wimborne; 1993–	Incumbent
