= Alf (album) =

Studio album by Alison Moyet
- Released: 5 November 1984
- Recorded: 1984
- Genres: Blue-eyed soul, smooth jazz, sophisti-pop
- Length: 37:47
- Label: CBS
- Producer: Steve Jolley & Tony Swain

Alison Moyet chronology
Alf (1984)	Raindancing (1987)

Singles from Alf
- 1. "Love Resurrection" Released: June 1984; 2. "All Cried Out" Released: September 1984; 3. "Invisible" Released: November 1984; 4. "For You Only" Released: October 1985

Alf is the debut solo studio album by English singer Alison Moyet, released on 5 November 1984 by CBS Records. The album launched Moyet's solo career following the disbanding of synth-pop duo Yazoo. The album reached No. 1 on the UK Albums Chart and features the singles "Love Resurrection", "All Cried Out", "Invisible" and "For You Only".

A deluxe edition of Alf was released on 25 November 2016 by BMG.

== Background ==
In 1983, shortly before the release of their second studio album, You and Me Both (1983), Yazoo announced that they were splitting up. Deciding to pursue a solo career, Moyet soon received various offers from different record companies. Moyet ended up signing to CBS for £1 million later that year. However, after signing the contract, Yazoo's American record company Warner Bros then put an injunction on her. The legal issues took a year to be resolved by settlement in 1984. When Moyet was able to start working on her debut album, a meeting was held with CBS. As both Spandau Ballet and Bananarama had been recently successful in the charts, the label suggested Moyet team up with their producers Tony Swain & Steve Jolley.

The collaboration with the two producers proved successful and the three began writing songs for an album. Moyet later recalled: "I was simply in a space with two accomplished and encouraging blokes who were saying, 'Let's write some songs', and we didn't find it hard." She told Number One in 1984: "With Swain and Jolley, I can get on with what I do best, writing lyrics and singing. We had a writing session at my house – two weeks around the piano. Some of the songs were written over the phone." Writing and recording sessions had to be done with haste due to Swain and Jolley's other commitments as producers. The recording sessions took three months to complete. CBS suggested the album be titled Alf, which had become Moyet's well-known nickname since before Yazoo.

Alf was released in November 1984 and was a commercial success in the United Kingdom and worldwide. The album topped the UK Albums Chart, and by early December, it had achieved a double platinum certification. In April 1985 it had gone triple platinum and in February 1987 it went quadruple. In 1985, the success of the album led to Moyet receiving her first Brit Award for Best British Female Solo Artist. Alf also reached No. 1 in New Zealand and would go eight times platinum there. In the United States, the album would prove to be Moyet's most successful commercially, peaking at No. 45. As of February 1994, Alf had sold three million copies worldwide.

The lead single "Love Resurrection" preceded the album. It was released in June 1984 and had reached No. 10 in the UK, also becoming successful across Europe and beyond. The second single "All Cried Out" was met with similar success when released in September 1984. It reached No. 8 in the UK. "Invisible", the third single, was released in November 1984 and reached No. 21 in the UK. In the US, it became Moyet's highest-charting single, reaching No. 31. In October 1985, "For You Only" was released as the fourth and final single from the album. When CBS first suggested releasing a fourth single, Moyet spoke against the idea and suggested she record a cover of "That Ole Devil Called Love" to give fans something new. Her version of the song was then recorded and released in March 1985, becoming a big hit, including in the UK where it reached No. 2. Despite this, CBS later decided to release "For You Only" as a single but in Europe and the US only. For its release as a single, "For You Only" was remixed and partially re-recorded to create a new version. The song was a success in Germany, peaking at No. 7 in late 1985.

The success of Alf would soon make Moyet resentful as she felt the album's mass market appeal had defined her before she had the chance and experience to properly decide the direction she wanted to take her solo career in. Furthermore, she felt the album and her weight-gain at that time "presented an image of unthreatening cosy womanliness". Speaking of the album, Moyet later recalled in 2016:

"I have, in the past, distanced myself from Alf. Because there were things about me at 21 that I could no longer relate to and it's slightly odd singing the lyrics of a 21-year-old as you age. But distance creates a love. I fell out with Alf because I felt like that, after making subsequent records, it was like walking down the street and being told, 'I liked you better when you were going out with him.' When you're older you can see that your first love was actually a really nice soul."

== Critical reception ==
Professional ratings
Review scores
Source	Rating
AllMusic	3/5 stars
Louder Than War	7.5/10
Number One	3/5 stars
Record Mirror	4/5 stars
Rolling Stone	4/5 stars
Sounds	2.5/5 stars

Upon release, Deanne Pearson of Number One said: "If you want genuine, heartfelt love songs, cries of passion without cliche, look no further than Alf. With a heart as big as her voice, Alison Moyet is one of the singer/songwriters of the '80s. Commercial but uncontrived. Unlike Wham, you don't feel you're being taken for a ride." Christopher Connelly of Rolling Stone noted: "Alf too often founders because of its disappointingly unimaginative arrangements. Throughout the record, Moyet's voice rings out vigorously enough, but Swain and Jolley have cloaked it in layers of dinky-sounding keyboards and dopey percussion. Their woefully banal instrumental accompaniment doesn't smother Moyet's voice but neither does it provide any support for her gutty warbling. Alf doesn't grasp or accommodate its vocalist's strengths. In the end, Moyet has to pull much of this record out of the fire all by herself." Cash Box commented: "Another in the latest breed of vocalists from the United Kingdom, Alison Moyet features a more powerful delivery than Sade, and the new wave dance slant of such cuts as 'Love Resurrection' and current torch-song single 'Invisible' should make Moyet a prime candidate for crossover success."

In a retrospective review, Stewart Mason of AllMusic summarised: "Hooking up with Bananarama's producers, Tony Swain and Steve Jolley, Moyet delivers an enormous, walloping mid-'80s pop sound that constantly threatens to overwhelm both the songs, which are a mixed bag, and occasionally even the formidably voiced singer herself. Several tracks make it through the production mill unscathed, notably the singles 'All Cried Out' and 'Love Resurrection,' but the album's pinnacle is the remarkable 'Invisible,' a soulful shouter that's among the great R&B pop singles of the '80s. Some of the other tracks would benefit from less-overbearing production, most notably the chilling 'Where Hides Sleep,' making Alf one of those albums that sounds better once the listener has mentally undressed the songs a bit."

Speaking of the 2016 deluxe edition, Attitude magazine writer Josh Lee stated: "Switching from the synth-pop she'd made with Vince Clarke to a mainstream pop sound fashioned by the writing/producing duo of Steve Jolley and Tony Swain, Moyet sang the hell out of hits like 'Love Resurrection', 'All Cried Out' and 'Invisible' on a long-player that sounds just as fresh and bright today. The deluxe edition remastering helps, but three-plus decades later the songs still stand up as pop classics." Gay Times magazine writer Darren Howard wrote: "Listening to Alf now, it still holds up. As with any Alison Moyet record you expect amazing vocals and you definitely get that here, the quality of the song-writing is high and the production hasn't dated, it's still a classic album and is only enhanced by the extra tracks included on this deluxe edition."

== Track listing ==
All tracks are written by Alison Moyet, Steve Jolley and Tony Swain, except "Invisible" by Lamont Dozier.

No.	Title	Length
1.	"Love Resurrection"	3:52
2.	"Honey for the Bees"	4:12
3.	"For You Only"	4:01
4.	"Invisible"	4:00
5.	"Steal Me Blind"	3:17
6.	"All Cried Out"	6:49
7.	"Money Mile"	3:43
8.	"Twisting the Knife"	3:27
9.	"Where Hides Sleep"	4:18

2016 remastered deluxe edition (bonus disc)
No.	Title	Writer(s)	Length
1.	"Love Resurrection" (U.S. Long Version)		5:32
2.	"All Cried Out" (The Remix)		8:05
3.	"Invisible" (Extended Version)		6:04
4.	"For You Only" (Extended New Version)		6:13
5.	"Love Resurrection" (Love Injected Remix)		8:52
6.	"Baby I Do"	Moyet, Jolley, Swain	3:11
7.	"Invisible" (Transparent Mix)		6:36
8.	"Hitch Hike"	Marvin Gaye, William "Mickey" Stevenson, Clarence Paul	2:41
9.	"For You Only" (New Version)		3:54
10.	"That Ole Devil Called Love"	Allan Roberts, Doris Fisher	3:05
11.	"Don't Burn Down the Bridge"	Ronnie Miller	3:56
12.	"That Ole Devil Called Love" (Jazz Version)		3:07
13.	"Don't Burn Down the Bridge" (Extended Version)		6:38
14.	"Twisting the Knife" (live at the Dominion, 1985)		3:27
15.	"That Ole Devil Called Love" (live at the Dominion, 1985)		3:44

== Personnel ==
- Alison Moyet – lead and backing vocal
- Steve Jolley – backing vocal, guitars on "Invisible"
- Tony Swain – keyboards
- Tim Goldsmith – drums

=== Production ===
- Produced by Steve Jolley & Tony Swain
- Recorded, engineered and mixed by Richard Lengyel (at Odyssey Studios, London, England; assisted by Roger Dobson)
- Mastered by Vlado Meller (at CBS Recording Studios, New York City)
- Simon Fowler – photography
- Rob O'Connor (Stylo Rouge) – artwork (design/art direction)

== Charts ==
=== Weekly charts ===
Weekly chart performance for Alf
Chart (1985)	Peak position
Australian Albums (Kent Music Report)	9
Canada Top Albums/CDs (RPM)	12
Dutch Albums (Album Top 100)	3
European Albums (Music & Media)	6
German Albums (Offizielle Top 100)	5
Italian Albums (Musica e dischi)	16
New Zealand Albums (RMNZ)	1
Norwegian Albums (VG-lista)	3
Swedish Albums (Sverigetopplistan)	11
Swiss Albums (Schweizer Hitparade)	2
UK Albums (Official Charts)	1
US Billboard 200	45

=== Year-end charts ===
1984 year-end chart performance for Alf
Chart (1984)	Position
UK Albums (Gallup)	15

1985 year-end chart performance for Alf
Chart (1985)	Position
Australian Albums (Kent Music Report)	33
Canada Top Albums/CDs (RPM)	48
Dutch Albums (Album Top 100)	7
European Albums (Music & Media)	9
German Albums (Offizielle Top 100)	15
New Zealand Albums (RMNZ)	7
Swiss Albums (Schweizer Hitparade)	16
UK Albums (Gallup)	11

== Certifications and sales ==
Certifications and sales for Alf
Region	Certification	Certified units/sales
Canada (Music Canada)	Gold	50,000^{^}
Germany (BVMI)	Platinum	500,000^{^}
New Zealand (RMNZ)	Platinum	15,000^{^}
United Kingdom (BPI)	4× Platinum	1,200,000^{^}
Summaries
Worldwide	—	3,000,000
^{^} Shipments figures based on certification alone.
