= Victor Should Have Been a Jazz Musician =

Single by Grace Jones

from the album Inside Story
- B-side: "Crush", "I'm Not Perfect (But I'm Perfect for You)"
- Released: March 1987
- Recorded: 1986
- Studio: Skyline Studios (New York, NY)
- Genre: Pop; jazz
- Length: 4:44
- Label: Manhattan
- Songwriters: Grace Jones; Bruce Woolley
- Producers: Grace Jones; Nile Rodgers

Grace Jones singles chronology
"Crush" (1987)	"Victor Should Have Been a Jazz Musician" (1987)	"Love on Top of Love" (1989)

"Victor Should Have Been a Jazz Musician" is a 1987 single by Grace Jones.

== Background ==
The song was the third European single from Grace Jones' 1986 album Inside Story, co-produced by Jones and Nile Rodgers. It was released simultaneously with "Crush", which promoted Inside Story in North America. The horns on the track were played by Lenny Pickett, Stan Harrison, Steve Elson, and Mac Gollehon under the collective name The Borneo Horns.

The 12" single featured remixes of "Victor Should Have Been a Jazz Musician" as well as "I'm Not Perfect (But I'm Perfect for You)" by Ben Liebrand, all of which remain unreleased on CD.

== Track listing ==
- 7" single

A. "Victor Should Have Been a Jazz Musician" – 4:42
B. "Crush" – 3:27

- 12" single

A. "Victor Should Have Been a Jazz Musician" (The JAZZclubmillionminutemix) – 6:58
B. "I'm Not Perfect (But I'm Perfect for You)" (The C + V.I. Minimix) – 6:49

== Chart performance ==
Chart (1987)	Peak position
Belgium (Ultratop 50 Flanders)	40
Netherlands (Dutch Top 40)	26
Netherlands (Single Top 100)	35
