= Joan: The Unauthorized Rusical! =

- RuPaul's Drag Race All Stars episode
- Episode no.: Season 8 Episode 6
- Presented by: RuPaul
- Original air date: June 9, 2023

Guest appearances
- Adam Shankman (guest judge); Leland; Angeria Paris VanMichaels

Episode chronology
| ← Previous "Snatch Game of Love" | Next → "Forensic Queens" |
- RuPaul's Drag Race All Stars season 8

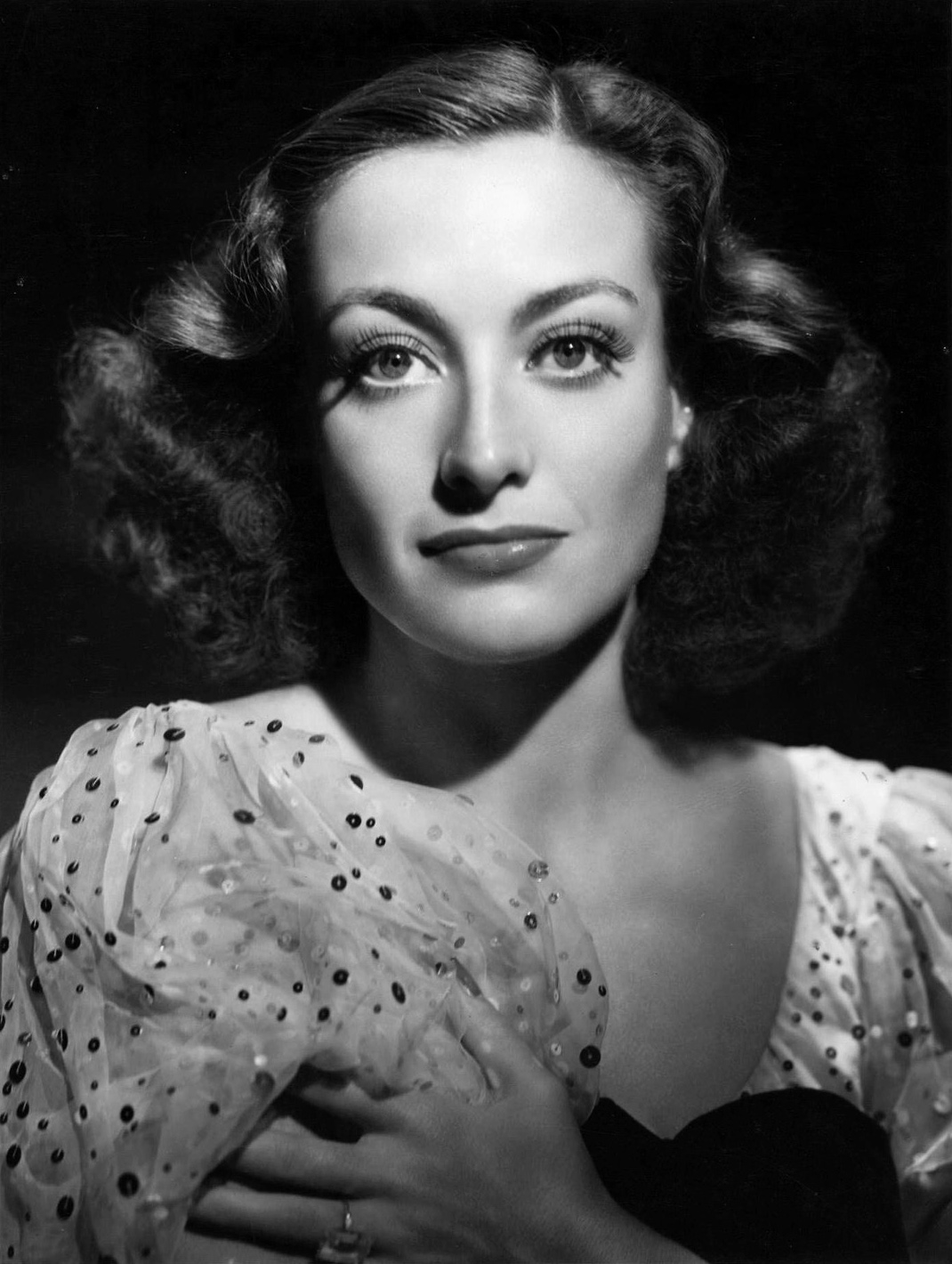
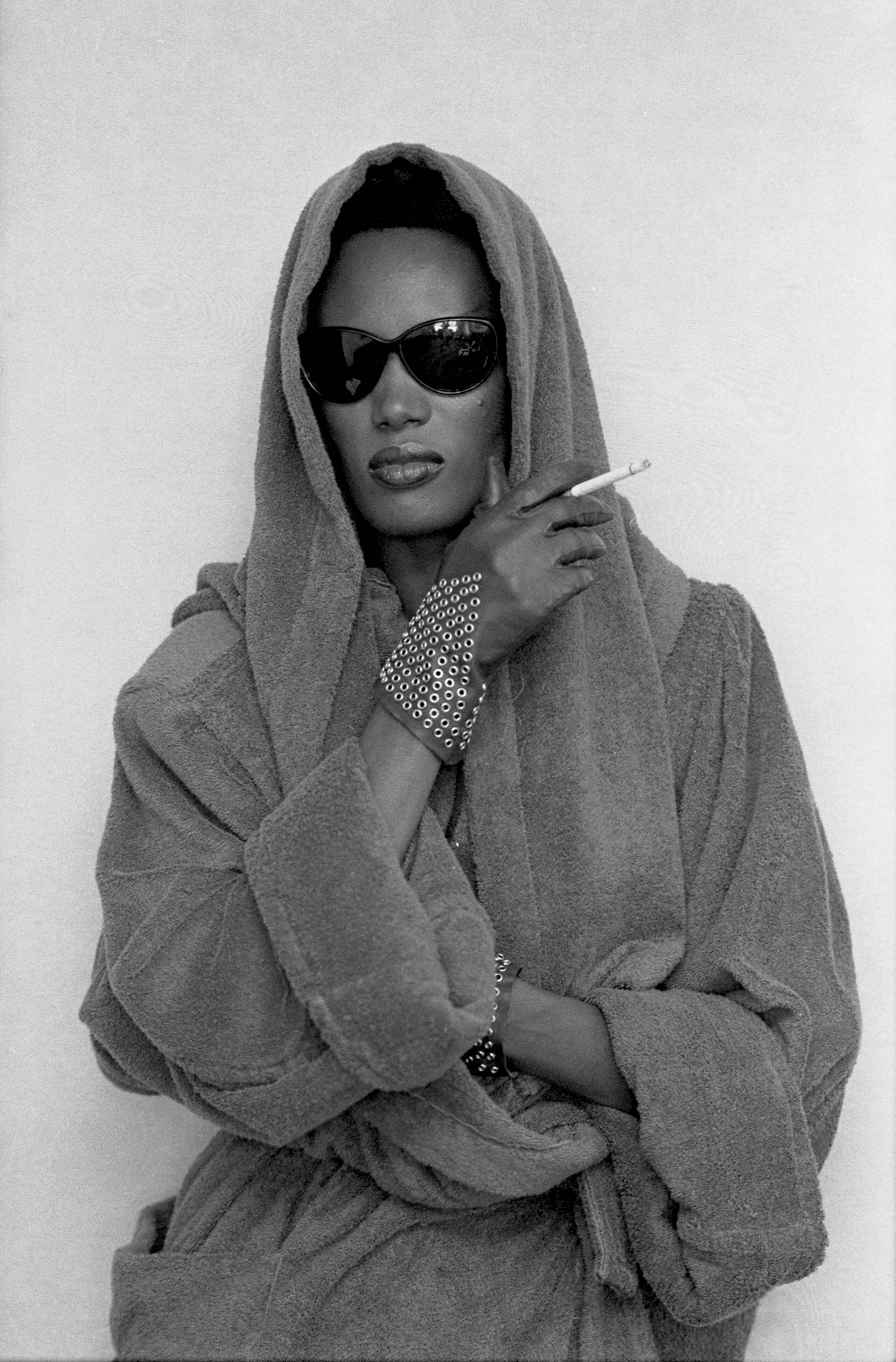
This episode's Rusical was inspired by Joan Crawford (top, pictured in 1936) and the fashion show paid tribute to Grace Jones (bottom, pictured in 1984).

"Joan: The Unauthorized Rusical!" is the sixth episode of the eighth season of the American reality competition television series RuPaul's Drag Race All Stars, which aired on online streaming service Paramount+ on June 9, 2023. The episode's main challenge tasks the contestants with recording vocals and performing choreography in a Rusical (musical theatre production) about actress Joan Crawford.

Film director Adam Shankman is a guest judge. Singer-songwriter Leland assists the contestants with recording vocals and Angeria Paris VanMicheals makes a guest appearance as the Lip-Sync Assassin. Kandy Muse wins the episode's main challenge. Jaymes Mansfield is eliminated from the competition by Kandy Muse, who beats Angeria Paris VanMicheals in a lip-sync contest to "I'm Not Perfect (But I'm Perfect for You)" by Jones.

== Episode ==
The seven remaining contestants return to the Werk Room after no one was eliminated by RuPaul on the previous episode. The contestants review how everyone voted and congratulate Jimbo for winning the main challenge. Jimbo expresses disappointment in her lip-sync track record. On a new day, RuPaul greets the group and reveals the main challenge, which tasks the contestants with recording vocals, then dancing and lip-syncing in a Rusical (musical theatre production) about Joan Crawford at different points in her career, extracted from the film Mommie Dearest, in which Crawford was portrayed by actress Faye Dunaway. RuPaul shares that the contestants will be working with Leland to record vocals, as well as director Adam Shankman on choreography. RuPaul also reveals the category for the fashion show: "Night of 1,000 Grace Jones's", or looks inspired by Grace Jones.

The contestants listen to the Rusical and decide on the cast. Jessica Wild and Kandy Muse audition for the role associated with wire clothes hangers. The contestants record vocals on the main stage with Leland and an audio engineer, then rehearse choreography with Shankman. On elimination day, the contestants make final preparations for the musical and fashion show. Some of the contestants talk about their roles and comfort levels with the challenge, as well as their track record in the competition and Jones's impact on their drag.

On the main stage, RuPaul welcomes fellow judges Michelle Visage and Ts Madison, as well as guest judge Shankman. RuPaul shares the assignment of the main challenge and the runway category. The musical commences, followed by the fashion show. Alexis Michelle and Jimbo are declared safe. The judges deliver their critiques, deliberate, then share the results with the contestants. Kandy Muse is declared the winner of the main challenge. Jaymes Mansfield and Kahanna Montrese place in the bottom. Off stage, the contestants cast their votes for who should be eliminated from the competition.

Back on the main stage, Kandy Muse is called upon to challenge a Lip-Sync Assassin in a "Lip Sync for Your Legacy" to try to win a cash price of $30,000 and earn the power to eliminate a contestant at risk of elimination. The Lip-Sync Assassin is revealed to be Angeria Paris VanMicheals, a contestant from the fourteenth season of RuPaul's Drag Race. Angeria Paris VanMicheals and Kandy Muse face off to Jones's 1986 song "I'm Not Perfect (But I'm Perfect for You)". Kandy Muse wins the lip-sync and reveals that she has chosen to eliminate Jaymes Mansfield from the competition.

== Production and broadcast ==
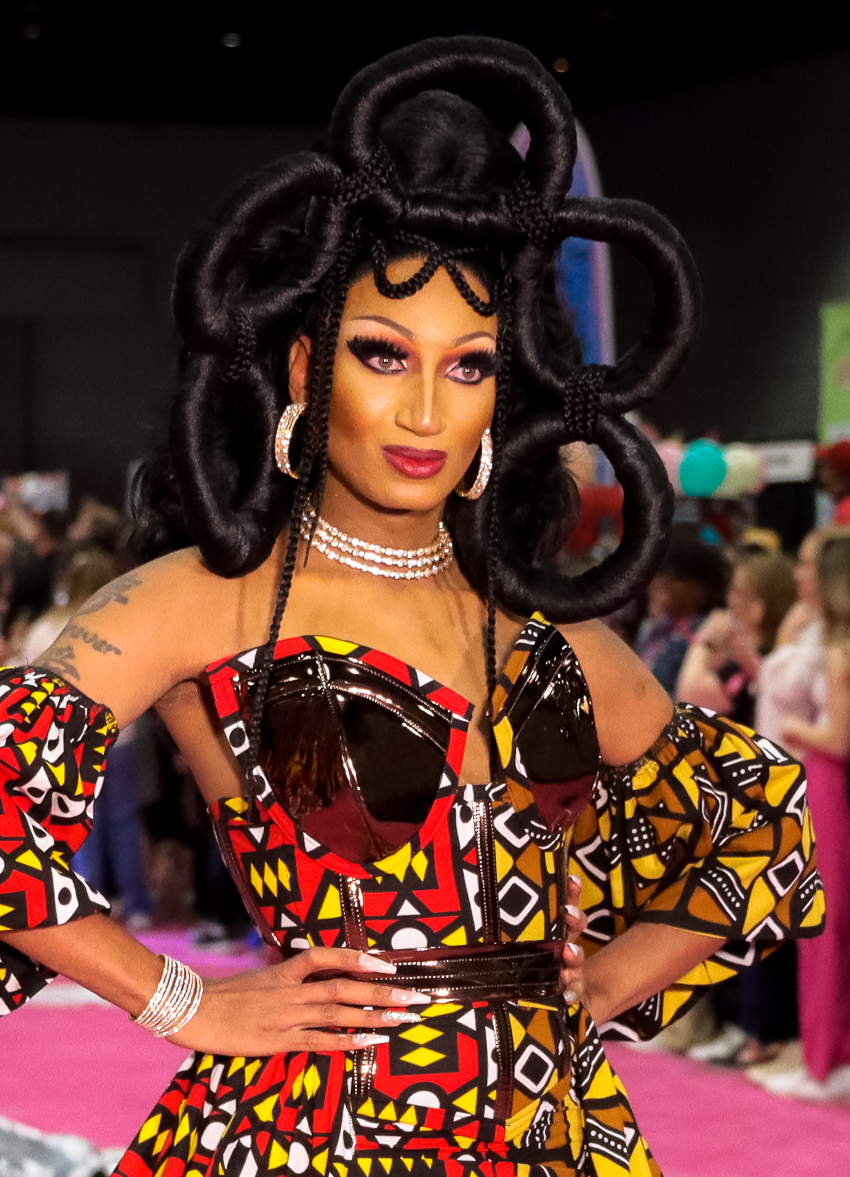
Angeria Paris VanMicheals (pictured at RuPaul's DragCon LA in 2023) makes a guest appearance as the Lip-Sync Assassin.

The episode aired on June 9, 2023.

Kandy Muse's scene references a scene in Mommie Dearest where Joan Crawford (played by Faye Dunaway) says, "No more wire hangers!" LaLa Ri vogues during her performance in the Rusical.

=== Fashion ===
On the main stage, RuPaul wears a blue dress with gold accessories and a long blonde wig. For the fashion show, Kahanna Montrese has a black-and-red showgirl-inspired dress with a red headpiece resembling a rose. Jaymes Mansfield wears an outfit with many fox furs, a dark wig, and a head covering. Kandy Muse has a colorful outfit with many geometric shapes in primary colors. Jessica Wild wears a purple dress and a dark wig. LaLa Ri has a black dress with tall boots and a headpiece. She has large earrings and carries a white mask. Alexis Michelle wears a black dress with a headpiece. Jimbo also has a black dress with matching high-heeled shoes and a dark wig.

== Reception ==
Jason P. Frank of Vulture rated the episode three out of five stars. Xtra Magazine's Kevin O'Keeffe said Kandy Muse "slayed" during the lip-sync contest and "served sex in a way that perfectly fit the Grace Jones song". Stephen Daw ranked the lip-sync seventh in Billboard's 2023 list of the season's contests, writing: "Both performers knew when to ramp up the sultry, sensual energy, and when to slow it right back down. But there was something magnetic about Kandy Muse's sharp, intense performance here that made us want to pull up to her bumper and watch this top-tier performance." Daw also ranked the episode's musical production sixth in the magazine's 2025 list of the show's Rusicals to date.
