= Bulletproof Heart (album) =

Studio album by Grace Jones
- Released: October 31, 1989
- Recorded: Soundtrack Studios; Quad Studios; Vision Sound Studios (New York City); Music Mountain Studios (Jamaica)
- Genre: R&B
- Length: 58:25 (CD); 72:07 (remastered CD)
- Label: Capitol
- Producers: Grace Jones; Chris Stanley; C+C Music Factory; Jonathan Elias

Grace Jones chronology
Inside Story (1986)	Bulletproof Heart (1989)	The Ultimate (1993)

Singles from Bulletproof Heart
- 1. "Love on Top of Love" Released: October 6, 1989; 2. "Amado Mio" Released: April 13, 1990

Bulletproof Heart is the ninth studio album by Jamaican singer and songwriter Grace Jones, released on October 31, 1989, by Capitol Records. The album, co-produced by Chris Stanley, would be Jones' last studio album for 19 years, until the release of Hurricane in 2008.

== Background, production and release ==
The album came after Jones' short break from recording music, during which she would again focus on acting, appearing in the all-star Straight to Hell and Mary Lambert's Siesta. On Bulletproof Heart Jones would work with producer Chris Stanley, who at that time had become her first husband. Stanley co-produced the album with her, co-wrote the majority of songs and delivered guest vocals on "Don't Cry Freedom". Three tracks were produced/co-produced by Robert Clivillés and David Cole of C+C Music Factory, who would achieve a global success with the dance track "Gonna Make You Sweat (Everybody Dance Now)" in 1990, and Jonathan Elias. Musically, Bulletproof Heart continued the commercial pop sound of the previous record, Inside Story, showcasing material heavily influenced by synthesizers, drums and electronic percussion. The CD version of the album included two additional songs, which were absent on the vinyl pressing. Although Jones has always stayed musically active, Bulletproof Heart would be her last studio album for almost two decades. None of her 1990s comeback attempts materialised and her next album, Hurricane, was eventually released in 2008. A remastered, copy protected edition of the album was released in 2004 on EMI Records, and came with two more bonus tracks.

== Singles ==
Only two singles were released from Bulletproof Heart. "Love on Top of Love" was chosen as the lead single and received numerous remixes. It met with limited success and only reached modest positions in Italy and the Netherlands. However, the 12" remix of the song, subtitled "Killer Kiss", was a significant club hit in the US.

Jones' cover of "Amado Mio", a song from the 1946 film Gilda, was released as the final single in 1990. It also made little impact, still reaching the top 40 in Italy, but placing at the bottom of the German and UK charts.

== Reception ==
Professional ratings
Review scores
Source	Rating
AllMusic	2/5 stars
Robert Christgau	C
The Rolling Stone Album Guide	2/5 stars

Bulletproof Heart met with unflattering reception in both critical and commercial performance. In his review music critic Robert Christgau wrote that the songs "proclaim her vulnerability and/or softness of orifice" and according to him the result is "incongruous". AllMusic gave the album two out of five stars. The commercial performance of the album was also poor: it peaked at number 55 in Germany, and number 108 in Australia, but failed to enter charts elsewhere, thus becoming the lowest-charting of all her studio albums and one of her least successful offerings.

== Track listing ==
All tracks are written by Grace Jones and Chris Stanley, except where noted.

LP version - Front Seat (Side A)
No.	Title	Writer(s)	Length
1.	"Driving Satisfaction"		5:50
2.	"Kicked Around"		5:37
3.	"Love on Top of Love"	David Cole; Jones	6:10
4.	"Paper Plan"		3:55
5.	"Crack Attack" (featuring Freedom)		5:20

LP version - Back Seat (Side B)
No.	Title	Writer(s)	Length
6.	"Bulletproof Heart"		4:19
7.	"On My Way"		4:24
8.	"Seduction Surrender"	Jonathan Elias; Alex Lasarenko; Jones; Stanley	4:57
9.	"Someone to Love"		4:47
10.	"Amado Mio"	Doris Fisher; Allen Roberts	5:20

CD version
No.	Title	Writer(s)	Length
8.	"Dream"		3:26
9.	"Seduction Surrender"	Elias; Lasarenko; Jones; Stanley	4:59
10.	"Someone to Love"		4:50
11.	"Don't Cry Freedom" (with Chris Stanley)	Stanley	4:16
12.	"Amado Mio"	Fisher; Roberts	5:20

2004 remastered CD reissue
No.	Title	Writer(s)	Length
13.	"Love on Top of Love – Killer Kiss" (Garage House Mix)	Cole; Jones	7:10
14.	"Amado Mio" (The Brazilian Mix)	Fisher; Roberts	6:25

Notes

- The remastered 2004 CD reissue of Bulletproof Heart has the same track order as the original 1989 LP release of the album, with "Dream" and "Don't Cry Freedom" appearing as tracks 11 and 12 respectively.
- Freedom is not credited as a feature on the album's tracklist.

== Personnel ==
- Josh Abbey – sound mixing
- Alan – horns, keyboards, percussion
- Jerry Bennett – drum programming
- Jay Berliner – flamenco guitar
- Jocelyn Brown – backing vocals
- Danny Browny – guitar
- Francesco Centeno – bass
- Robert Clivillés – production, drum programming, percussion, sound mixing, sound editing
- David Cole – production, arrangements, keyboards, synthesizers, sound mixing, sound editing
- Dominic Cortese – accordion
- Ricky Crespo – sound editing
- Craig Derry – backing vocals
- Tyrone Downie – keyboards
- Jonathan Elias – production, arrangements, drum programming, keyboards, synthesizer programming
- Jeffrey Fey – design
- Chris Floberg – sound mixing
- Ray Foote – FX guitar
- Sherman Foote – drum programming, synthesizer programming, sound engineering, sound mixing
- Chris Fosdick – vocal effects
- Freedom – rap
- David Gennaro – vocals engineering
- Greg Gorman – inside photography
- Gordon Gottlieb – percussion
- Jean-Paul Goude – cover art

- Diva Gray – backing vocals
- Steve "Griff" Griffin – recording engineering
- Lani Groves – backing vocals
- Clive Hunt – bass, horns, keyboards
- Chip Jenkins – synth programming
- Grace Jones – production, arrangements, vocals
- Curtis King Jr. – backing vocals
- Alex Lasarenko – keyboards, piano, synth bass, arrangement
- Jim "Bonzai" Lyon – mix engineering
- Willie Menendez – narration
- Jim Nicholson – synth programming, sound engineering
- Clifford Pemsler – synth programming, sound engineering
- Janice Pendarvis – backing vocals
- Lenny Pickett – saxophone
- Carl Pitterson – drum programming, keyboards, percussion, sound engineering, sound mixing
- Tom Regis – drum programming
- José Rodriguez – mastering
- Paul Seymour – vocals engineering
- Ira Siegel – groove guitar
- Frank Simms – backing vocals
- Chris Stanley – production, keyboards, bass, guest vocal
- Vanessee Thomas – backing vocals
- Dave Tofani – tenor saxophone
- George Victory – guitar, bass guitar, rhythm guitar, keyboards
- Martha Wash – backing vocals
- Kenny Williams – backing vocals

== Charts ==
Weekly chart performance for Bulletproof Heart
Chart (1989)	Peak position
Australian Albums (ARIA)	108
German Albums (Offizielle Top 100)	55

== Release history ==
Release history and formats for Bulletproof Heart
Region	Year	Format(s)	Label
Various	1989	LP, CD, Cassette	Capitol, Jugoton
Europe	2004	CD	EMI
