= Kicked Around =

Kicked Around may refer to:

- "Kicked Around", a 1965 single B-side by The Ad Libs
- "Kicked Around", a 1989 song by Grace Jones from the album Bulletproof Heart
