= Allan Roberts (songwriter) =

American musician and songwriter (1905–1966)

Allan Roberts (March 12, 1905 – January 14, 1966) was an American musician and songwriter, whose songs, co-written with Doris Fisher and other writers, were successfully recorded by the Mills Brothers, Ella Fitzgerald, the Ink Spots, Billie Holiday, the Andrews Sisters, Marilyn Monroe, Perry Como, and many others.

== Biography ==
He was born in Brooklyn, and trained as an accountant before working as a pianist in clubs and shows on and around Broadway, where he met and worked with theater and film producer Mike Todd. He wrote "You Opened My Eyes" for the Bill Barry Orchestra in 1935; and in 1937 co-wrote, with Irving Gordon and Alvin S. Kaufman, the song "Me, Myself, and I", which was recorded by Billie Holiday, Benny Goodman and others.

He met aspiring songwriter Doris Fisher, the daughter of respected Tin Pan Alley songwriter and music publisher Fred Fisher, and in 1944 the two began collaborating on songs. They found immediate success with such popular songs as "You Always Hurt the One You Love", "Into Each Life Some Rain Must Fall", "That Ole Devil Called Love", "Angelina (The Waitress at the Pizzeria)", and "Invitation to the Blues", which he co-wrote with Fisher and Arthur Gershwin, the younger brother of George and Ira Gershwin. In 1945, he and Fisher were signed by Harry Cohn of Columbia Pictures in Hollywood to a seven-year contract to supply songs for films. They had immediate success with the songs "Amado Mio" and "Put the Blame on Mame", written for Gilda starring Rita Hayworth, and in all contributed to about twenty films for the company, including Dead Reckoning and The Lady from Shanghai.

After Doris Fisher married in 1947 and retired from the entertainment industry, Roberts linked up with Lester Lee, with whom he co-wrote "You're Never Too Old", "Every Baby Needs a Da Da Daddy" and other songs in the 1948 movie Ladies of the Chorus starring Marilyn Monroe. He and Lee then wrote the music for the 1949 Broadway show All for Love . With Robert Allen, he also co-wrote Perry Como's 1952 hit, "To Know You (Is to Love You)".

Roberts died at a Florida hospital, at age 60. A notice in Billboard indicated that the location was in Hollywood, while The New York Times obituary, which featured an age discrepancy and gave the location's name as Hallandale, specified that "Allan Roberts, a lyricist, died of a heart attack today at a local hospital. He was 62 years old." The obituary further notes that "[H]is survivors include his widow, Molly, and two sons, Robert and Jeffery, all of Hollywood."
