= Jessica Wild =

Puerto Rican drag queen, professional make-up artist, and reality television personality

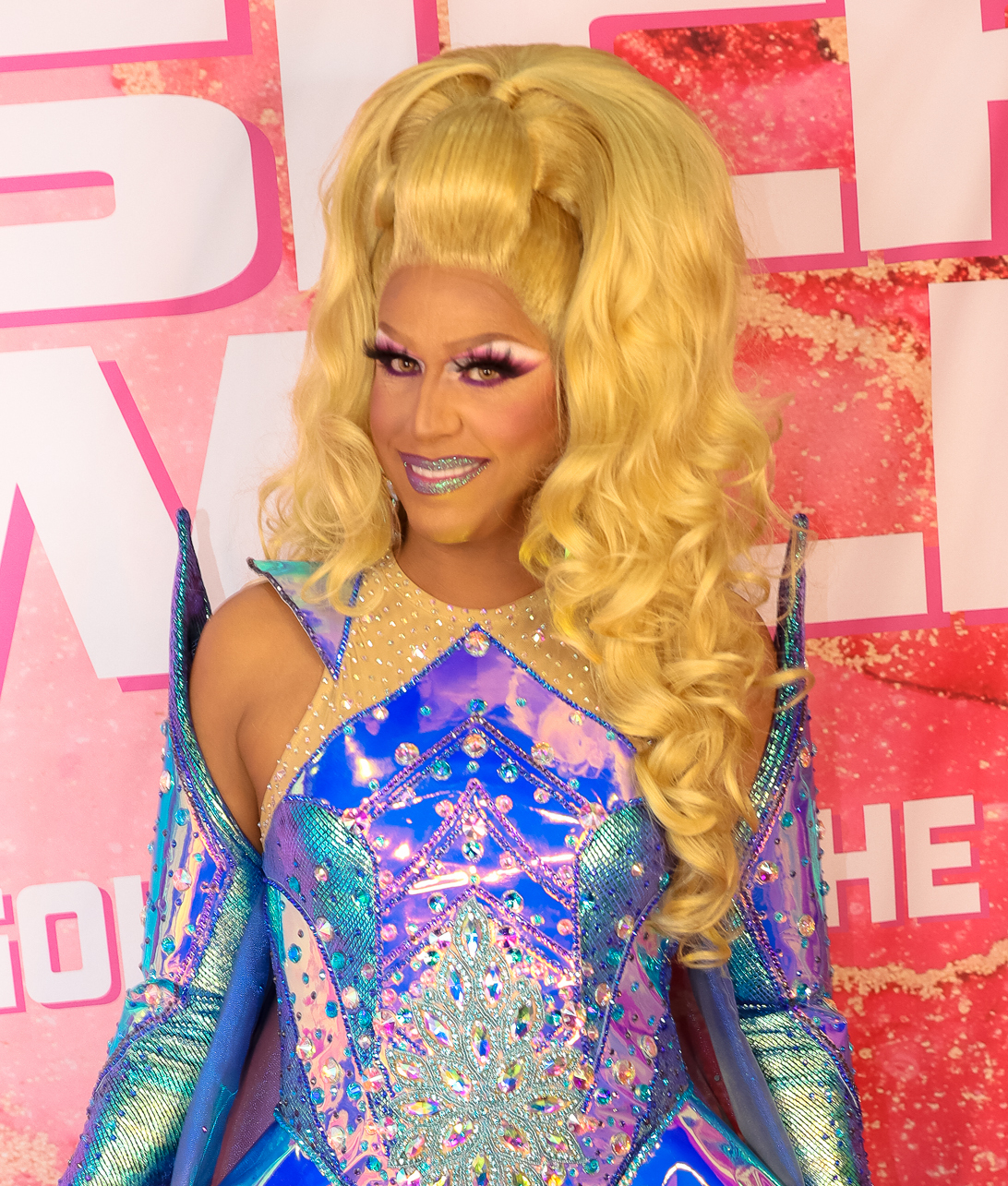
- Jessica Wild at RuPaul's DragCon LA, 2023
- Born: José David Sierra; June 10, 1980 (age 46); San Juan, Puerto Rico
- Occupations: Drag queen Make-up artist Reality television personality
- Website: Official website

José David Sierra, better known as Jessica Wild (born June 10, 1980), is a Puerto Rican drag queen, professional make-up artist, and reality television personality. She was a contestant on the second season of RuPaul's Drag Race and the eighth season of RuPaul's Drag Race All Stars.

== Early life ==
Sierra was born in San Juan but raised in Borinquen, Caguas, Puerto Rico. He is the youngest of three siblings. He started his drag career in 1998 at local San Juan gay venues such as Krash (also known as Eros) and Starz. His drag name comes from a girl whom he dated as a teenager and "Wild" comes from an adjective he used to describe his dance performances. He cites his inspirations as Madonna, Gloria Estefan, Lady Gaga, Jennifer Lopez, Olga Tañón, Gloria Trevi, Mónica Naranjo, Thalía, and Tammie Brown.

== Career ==
=== Television ===
Sierra competed as Jessica Wild on the second season of Logo's reality series, RuPaul's Drag Race, which premiered in February 2010. She was eliminated in the seventh episode of the season, which aired on March 22, 2010.

Besides her participation on RuPaul's Drag Race, Wild (along with season one contestant Nina Flowers) has performed on the popular Puerto Rican television program Objetivo Fama, which airs in the U.S. and throughout Latin America. She also has made appearances on No te Duermas and other local television programs and specials. Jessica Wild was in a commercial for Absolut Vodka among a series with other season two queens in 2011. In August 2015, she and 29 other drag queens performed with Miley Cyrus at the MTV Videos Music Awards.

In July 2021, Jessica Wild returned to season 6 of RuPaul's Drag Race All Stars as a lip sync assassin and won the lip sync against Jan to "Womanizer" by Britney Spears. In 2022, Jessica Wild appeared in Jennifer Lopez's performance at the 2022 iHeartRadio Music Awards. Jessica Wild competed on the eighth season of RuPaul's Drag Race All Stars (2023). She placed 3rd in the season, being eliminated by Kandy Muse.

=== Music ===
Since appearing on RuPaul's Drag Race, Jessica Wild appeared in a music video for the reggaeton band Calle 13, and fielded offers to record a dance/techno music album. She has performed live with Puerto Rican rock band Rebeldía. In January 2011, Jessica Wild and with DJ Ranny released the dance single "You Like It Wild", which debuted at number 42 on the Billboard Hot Dance Club Songs, before peaking at number 30. In addition, she recorded a duet with the Fedro called "Maquillaje" which is part of the singer's new album. She has also performed on stage with Gloria Trevi.

== Personal life ==
Sierra has lived in Boston.

== Filmography ==
=== Television ===
Year	Title	Role	Notes
2010	RuPaul's Drag Race (season 2)	Herself	Contestant (6th Place)
2010	RuPaul's Drag Race: Untucked	Herself	Contestant
2015	Hey Qween!	Herself	Guest
2015	Skin Wars	Herself	Guest
2016	Watch What Happens Live with Andy Cohen	Herself	Guest
2018	RuPaul's Drag Race (season 10)	Herself	Guest - Episode 1
2019	The Q Agenda	Herself	Episode: "Jessica Wild / Luis Suarez"
2021	RuPaul's Drag Race All Stars (season 6)	Herself	"Lip-Sync Assassin", episode 4
2021	RuPaul's Drag Race All Stars: Untucked (season 3)	Herself	"Lip-Sync Assassin", episode 4
2023	RuPaul's Drag Race All Stars (season 8)	Herself	Contestant (3rd Place)
2023	RuPaul's Drag Race All Stars: Untucked	Herself	Contestant (3rd Place)

=== Web series ===
Year	Title	Role	Notes	Ref.
2017	Fashion Photo RuView	Herself	Guest Co-Host	
2018	Bootleg Opinions	Herself	Guest, hosted by Yuhua Hamasaki	
2020	Dragueando	Herself	Guest	
2023	Meet the Queens	Herself	Stand-alone special RuPaul's Drag Race All Stars 8	
2023	EW News Flash	Herself	Guest	
2023	BuzzFeed Celeb	Herself	Guest	
2023	React to TikTok Trends by Allure	Herself	Guest	
2024	Binge Queens	Herself	Guest	
2024	The Pit Stop	Herself	Guest	
2024	Very Delta	Herself		

== Discography ==
=== Singles ===
Year	Title	Notes
2011	"You Like It Wild"	Billboard Hot Dance Club Songs - #30
2013	"Absolutely"	
2023	"Puterra"	
2023	"You Like It Wild (Reloaded)"	

==== As featured artist ====
Year	Title	Album
2023	"Money, Success, Fame, Glamour" (Disco version) (with the cast of RuPaul's Drag Race All Stars, season 8)	Non-album single
2023	"Joan! The Unauthorized Rusical" (with the cast of RuPaul's Drag Race All Stars, season 8)	Joan! The Unauthorized Rusical Album
