= Love on Top of Love =

Single by Grace Jones

from the album Bulletproof Heart
- B-side: "Dream"; "On My Way"
- Released: October 1989
- Label: Capitol
- Composer: David Cole
- Lyricists: David Cole; Grace Jones
- Producers: David Cole; Robert Clivilles

Grace Jones singles chronology
"Victor Should Have Been a Jazz Musician" (1987)	"Love on Top of Love" (1989)	"Amado Mio" (1990)

Music video
- "Love on Top of Love" on YouTube

"Love on Top of Love" is a song by Grace Jones released in 1989 as the first single from Jones' ninth studio album Bulletproof Heart .

== Background ==
"Love on Top of Love", subtitled "Killer Kiss" on single releases, was produced by C+C Music Factory's David Cole and Robert Clivilles. Another album track, "On My Way", made the single B-side in the UK, while "Dream", a track available only on Bulletproof Heart CD releases, elsewhere. The song met with considerable success and reached #1 on the Billboard Hot Club Dance Play chart for two weeks in December 1989.

== Music video ==
The music video features Jones wearing a swimsuit and sunglasses in a pool with a black-and-white screen in the background showing her smoking. A subsequent scene show Jones in bed wearing a swim cap while surrounded by men. Jones originally shot the video with a Danish actor Sven-Ole Thorsen, whom she dated, playing her boyfriend but his scenes were cut out. The video was directed by Greg Gorman.

== Track listing ==
- 7" single

A. "Love on Top of Love (Killer Kiss)" – 4:57
B. "Dream" – 3:26

- UK 7" single

A. "Love on Top of Love (Killer Kiss)" – 4:57
B. "On My Way" – 4:26

- 12" single

A1. "Love on Top of Love (Killer Kiss)" (The Funky Dred Club Mix) – 6:21
A2. "Love on Top of Love (Killer Kiss)" (The Funky Dred Dub Mix) – 6:26
B1. "Love on Top of Love (Killer Kiss)" (Grace's Swing Mix) – 7:32
B2. "Love on Top of Love (Killer Kiss)" (The Cole & Clivilles Garage House Mix) – 7:45

- German 12" single

A. "Love on Top of Love (Killer Kiss)" (The Funky Dred Club Mix) – 6:22
B1. "Love on Top of Love (Killer Kiss)" (The Funky Dred Dub Mix) – 6:27
B2. "Love on Top of Love (Killer Kiss)" (The Cole & Clivilles Garage House Mix) – 7:10

- UK CD maxi-single
1. "Love on Top of Love" (single version) – 5:00
2. "Love on Top of Love" (garage house mix version) – 7:10
3. "Love on Top of Love" (swing mix version) – 7:46
- UK CD promotional single
1. "Love on Top of Love" (single version) – 4:36
2. "Love on Top of Love" (The Funky Dred Club Mix) – 6:21
- German CD maxi-single
1. "Love on Top of Love (Killer Kiss)" (The Funky Dred Club Mix) – 6:22
2. "Love on Top of Love (Killer Kiss)" (The Funky Dred Dub Mix) – 6:27
3. "Love on Top of Love (Killer Kiss)" (The Cole & Clivilles Garage House Mix) – 7:10

== Chart performance ==
Chart (1989)	Peak position
Australia (ARIA)	121
Netherlands (Single Top 100)	47
Spain (AFYVE)	35
US Dance Club Songs (Billboard)	1
