= Amado Mio =

1946 song by Doris Fisher and Allan Roberts

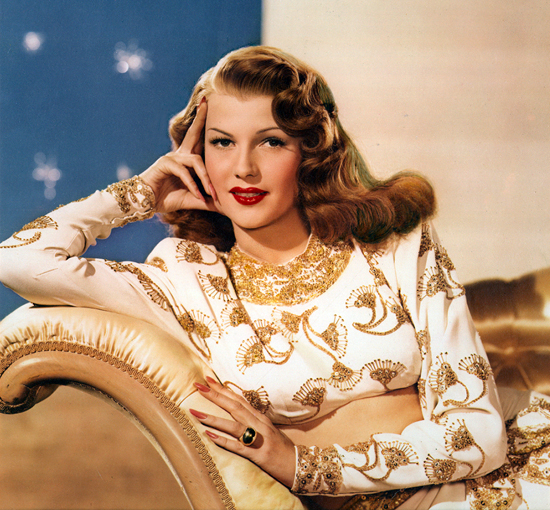
Rita Hayworth in the costume for the "Amado Mio" nightclub sequence in Gilda

"Amado Mio" is a song from the classic 1946 film noir Gilda, written by Doris Fisher and Allan Roberts. The piece was lip-synched by Rita Hayworth and sung by Anita Kert Ellis. Grace Jones's rendition of the song on her 1989 album Bulletproof Heart was released as a single in a special "Brazilian Mix" in 1990. It became a significant dance hit in the US.

== Grace Jones version ==
"Amado Mio"

Single by Grace Jones

from the album Bulletproof Heart
- B-side: "Crack Attack"
- Released: April 1990
- Genre: House
- Length: 5:20 (album version); 4:01 (radio edit)
- Label: Capitol
- Songwriters: Doris Fisher; Allan Roberts
- Producer: Jonathan Elias

Grace Jones singles chronology
"Love on Top of Love" (1989)	"Amado Mio" (1990)	"7 Day Weekend" (1992)

In 1989 Grace Jones recorded a version of the song on her album Bulletproof Heart.

A special "Brazilian Mix" of "Amado Mio" was produced by Clivillés and Cole and served as second single of the album, released in 1990. This mix was later available on the 2004 CD re-issue of Bulletproof Heart. The mix charted low on European charts, despite being promoted live on various occasions. In the US, the single was a double A-side with "Crack Attack", and became a significant dance hit.

=== Track listing ===
- 7" single

A. "Amado Mio" (The Brazilian Mix – radio edit) – 3:45
B. "Amado Mio" (LP version – radio edit) – 4:02

- 12" single

A. "Amado Mio" (The Brazilian Mix) – 6:24
B1. "Amado Mio" (The 28th St. Crew Club Mix) – 6:16
B2. "Amado Mio" (The 28th St. Crew Dub Mix) – 7:08

- US 12" single

A1. "Amado Mio" (The Brazilian Mix) – 6:23
A2. "Amado Mio" (The 28th St. Crew Dub Mix) – 7:08
B1. "Crack Attack" (The Don't Do It Mix) – 6:16
B2. "Crack Attack" (LP version) – 5:20

- CD single
1. "Amado Mio" (The Brazilian Mix) – 6:24
2. "Amado Mio" (The 28th St. Crew Club Mix) – 6:16
3. "Amado Mio" (The 28th St. Crew Dub Mix) – 7:08

=== Charts ===
Chart (1990)	Peak position
Italy Airplay (Music & Media)	4
UK Singles (Official Charts)	96
US Dance Club Songs (Billboard)	11
West Germany (GfK)	83

== Other cover versions ==
- In the 1940s the song was recorded several times such as by Dick Haymes (released in June 1946), Italian singer Natalino Otto (1947 in Italian) and Czech singer Jiřina Salačová (1947).

In 1989, the song was recorded by the famous Spanish actress and singer Sara Montiel.

- Pink Martini covered the song on their 1997 album Sympathique. This version was used in the Mexican movie Y Tu Mama Tambien and the 2021 Netflix movie Red Notice.
- Finnish singer Ilkka "Danny" Lipsanen also covered the song.
- Kurdish singer Homer Dzayi also covered the song in 2019 under the title Layla Paul Malak.
- Hungarian singers Anna Kapitány, Katalin Karády and Márta Záray also covered the song, with a romantic, but very different lyrics.

== In media ==
In episode 4 of season 4 of the Netflix Money Heist television series, the song is played by Pink Martini.
