= Party Girl (Grace Jones song) =

Single by Grace Jones

from the album Inside Story
- B-side: "White Collar Crime"
- Released: December 1986
- Studio: Skyline Studios (New York, NY)
- Genre: Pop; funk
- Length: 3:42
- Label: Manhattan Records
- Songwriters: Grace Jones; Bruce Woolley
- Producers: Grace Jones; Nile Rodgers

Grace Jones singles chronology
"I'm Not Perfect (But I'm Perfect for You)" (1986)	"Party Girl" (1986)	"Crush" (1987)

"Party Girl" is a single by Grace Jones released in 1986.

== Background ==
"Party Girl" blends pop and funk music, with an addition of Caribbean sound to it. It was released as the second single from Inside Story, an album Grace co-wrote and co-produced, in December 1986 in Europe and 1987 in the United States. The song was remixed by Steve Thompson and Michael Barbiero for single release and another Inside Story track, "White Collar Crime", was used as the single B-side. Additional reggae guitar was played by 52nd Street guitarist Tony Henry. "Party Girl" was released in a limited shaped picture disc format, that came in a cardboard stand up.

The song made little impact on music charts, however, it became a top 20 dance hit in the US.

== Track listing ==
- 7" single

A. "Party Girl" – 3:42
B. "White Collar Crime" – 5:04

- 12" single

A. "Party Girl" (Extended Remix) – 7:23
B. "White Collar Crime" – 5:04

- 12" maxi-single

A. "Party Girl" (Extended Remix) – 7:23
B1. "Party Girl" (Dub) – 4:59
B2. "White Collar Crime" – 5:03

- 12" US single

A. "Party Girl" (Extended Remix) – 7:22
B1. "Party Girl" (Dub Version) – 5:00
B2. "Party Girl" (7" Edit) – 3:35

== Chart performance ==
Chart (1986–87)	Peak position
UK Singles (Official Charts)	82
US Dance Club Songs (Billboard)	19
West Germany (GfK)	53

== Release history ==
Release dates and formats for "Party Girl"
Region	Date	Label(s)	Format(s)	Cat. No.	Ref.
United Kingdom	March 9, 1987	Manhattan; EMI	7-inch; 12-inch	MT 20; 12MT 20	
