= That Ole Devil Called Love =

1944 song first performed by Billie Holiday

"That Ole Devil Called Love" is a song written in 1944 by Allan Roberts and Doris Fisher. It was first recorded by Billie Holiday, who released it as the B-side of her hit "Lover Man" in 1945.

In 1985, the song was recorded by Alison Moyet, whose version, produced by Pete Wingfield, topped the chart in New Zealand for three weeks and reached number 2 on the UK Singles Chart.

== Alison Moyet version ==
"That Ole Devil Called Love"

Single by Alison Moyet
- B-side: "Don't Burn Down the Bridge"
- Released: 8 March 1985
- Genre: Pop, jazz
- Length: 3:05
- Label: CBS
- Songwriters: Allan Roberts, Doris Fisher
- Producer: Pete Wingfield

Alison Moyet singles chronology
"Invisible" (1984)	"That Ole Devil Called Love" (1985)	"For You Only" (1985)

Official audio
- "That Ole Devil Called Love" on YouTube

In 1985, Alison Moyet released her own version of the song as a non-album single. It reached No. 2 in the UK and remained in the charts for ten weeks. A music video was filmed to promote the single, which was directed by Vaughan Arnell and Anthea Benton.

Moyet's version was recorded following the success of her debut album Alf. When CBS suggested releasing a fourth single from the album, Moyet spoke against the idea and suggested she record a cover of "That Ole Devil Called Love" in order to give fans something new. Speaking to the BBC in 2004, Moyet commented on the song: "After my versions of "That Ole Devil Called Love" and "Love Letters" did well, there was definite pressure for me to become some sort of jazz diva."

=== Reception ===
Upon release, Marshall O'Leary of Smash Hits did not consider the song to be "one of [her] favourites" but described it as a "smoochy number" and "one to play while you're with your loved one". Peter Trollope of the Liverpool Echo commented: "[Moyet] gets the blues and coaxes it into another smash single that has the look of a number one about it!"

=== Charts ===
==== Weekly charts ====
Weekly chart performance for "That Ole Devil Called Love"
Chart (1985)	Peak position
Australia (Kent Music Report)	46
Belgium (Ultratop 50 Flanders)	10
Europe (European Top 100 Singles)	36
Ireland (IRMA)	2
Netherlands (Dutch Top 40)	6
Netherlands (Single Top 100)	5
New Zealand (Recorded Music NZ)	1
Switzerland (Schweizer Hitparade)	21
UK Singles (Official Charts)	2
West Germany (GfK)	29

==== Year-end charts ====
Year-end chart performance for "That Ole Devil Called Love"
Chart (1985)	Position
Belgium (Ultratop 50 Flanders)	90
Netherlands (Dutch Top 40)	51
Netherlands (Single Top 100)	61
New Zealand (Recorded Music NZ)	8
UK Singles (OCC)	42

== Other versions ==
Other artists who have recorded the song include Tony Bennett, Ella Fitzgerald, Diane Schuur, Jeri Southern and Susannah McCorkle.
