= Honey for the Bees =

1984 song by Alison Moyet

"Honey for the Bees" is a song by British singer-songwriter Alison Moyet, released in 1984 as a track on her debut solo album Alf. It was written by Moyet, Steve Jolley and Tony Swain, and produced by Jolley and Swain.

In 1985, American singer Patti Austin covered the song for her sixth studio album Gettin' Away with Murder.

== Alison Moyet version ==
"Honey for the Bees"

Song by Alison Moyet

from the album Alf
- Released: 1984
- Length: 4:12
- Label: CBS/Columbia
- Songwriter(s): Alison Moyet; Steve Jolley; Tony Swain
- Producer(s): Jolley & Swain

=== Reception ===
In a review of Alf, Bill Henderson of the Orlando Sentinel felt the song was "about uncontrollable mutual attraction and not being able to get enough of it". Ted Drozdowski of The Boston Globe wrote: "A lesser artist than Moyet would have made this a lesser solo debut but her clear, expressive contralto molds even cheap come-ons like "Honey for the Bees" and "Love Resurrection" into strong declarations of real romance."

Cheryl Wenner of The Morning Call described the song as "frankly sensual" and added that it "brings the Temptations to mind". Greg Kennedy of the Red Deer Advocate commented that the song "could set a few aerobics classes on their ears". In a review of Moyet's concert at the Dominion Theatre, Barney Hoskyns of The Guardian stated: "There are moments of power on faster numbers: "Honey for the Bees" suggests the corporate mid-Atlantic soul of Madonna."

=== Personnel ===
- Alison Moyet - lead vocals, backing vocals
- Tony Swain - keyboards
- Tim Goldsmith - drums

Production

- Tony Swain, Steve Jolley - producers
- Richard Lengyel - recording engineer
- Roger Dobson - assistant engineer

== Patti Austin version ==
"Honey for the Bees"

Single by Patti Austin

from the album Gettin' Away with Murder
- B-side: "Hot! In the Flames of Love"
- Released: 1985
- Length: 3:45
- Label: Qwest Records
- Songwriter(s): Alison Moyet; Steve Jolley; Tony Swain
- Producer(s): Tommy LiPuma

Patti Austin singles chronology
"Gimme, Gimme, Gimme" (1985)	"Honey for the Bees" (1985)	"The Heat of Heat" (1986)

In 1985, Patti Austin covered the song for her sixth studio album Gettin' Away with Murder. Produced by Tommy LiPuma, Austin's version was released as the lead single and reached No. 15 on the US Billboard Hot Dance Club Songs chart, No. 6 on the Billboard Hot Dance Singles Sales, and No. 24 on the Billboard Hot Black Singles chart.

=== Reception ===
Upon release, Cash Box listed the single as one of their "feature picks" during December 1985. They described the song as a "prime dance tune" and added: "This searing funk rocker features a stiff percussion and Austin's sparkling vocal." Billboard commented: "A page from the "Alf" songbook, decked out in elaborate layers of sound and handled with joy." Blues & Soul gave the song a 7 out of 10 rating and felt LiPuma's "busy" production was a "wonderful bedrock for Patti's strong vocalising". They added: "She really does seem to excel in the airiness of the melody — not your gut-wrenching stuff by a long chalk but decidedly catchy."

=== Track listing ===
7" single

1. "Honey for the Bees" (Extended Version Edit) - 3:45
2. "Hot! In the Flames of Love" - 3:59

7" single (US promo)

1. "Honey for the Bees" (Extended Version Edit) - 3:45
2. "Honey for the Bees" (Extended Version Edit) - 3:45

12" single

1. "Honey for the Bees" (Extended Version) - 6:40
2. "Honey for the Bees" (Instrumental) - 5:30
3. "Hot! In the Flames of Love" - 3:59

=== Personnel ===
- Tommy LiPuma - producer
- Judy Weinstein, Larry Levan - remix
- Doc Dougherty - remix engineer
- John Brown - remix consultant
- Ted Jensen - mastering

=== Charts ===
Chart (1985)	Peak position
US Billboard Hot Black Singles	24
US Billboard Hot Dance Club Songs	15
US Billboard Hot Dance Singles Sales	6
