= Inside Story (Grace Jones album) =

Studio album by Grace Jones
- Released: November 14, 1986
- Recorded: 1986
- Studios: Skyline Studios (New York, NY)
- Genre: R&B
- Length: 41:57
- Label: Manhattan
- Producers: Nile Rodgers; Grace Jones

Grace Jones chronology
Island Life (1985)	Inside Story (1986)	Bulletproof Heart (1989)

Singles from Inside Story
- 1. "I'm Not Perfect (But I'm Perfect for You)" Released: November 1986; 2. "Party Girl" Released: March 1987 (UK) May 1987 (US); 3. "Crush" Released: March 1987 (US); 4. "Victor Should Have Been a Jazz Musician" Released: May 1987 (Netherlands, West Germany, France)

Professional ratings
Review scores
Source	Rating
AllMusic	3.5/5 stars
Robert Christgau	B+

Inside Story is the eighth studio album by Jamaican singer and songwriter Grace Jones, released on November 14, 1986, her first with the Manhattan Records label. The album spawned the hit single "I'm Not Perfect (But I'm Perfect for You)".

== Production and release ==
Having achieved a major success with the comeback album Slave to the Rhythm and the best-selling hits compilation Island Life, both in 1985, Grace Jones delivered her next album the following year. Released under her new contract with Manhattan Records, Inside Story saw Jones working with producer Nile Rodgers of Chic (Jones had previously tried to work with the band during the disco era). The album was recorded at Skyline Studios in New York City and post-produced at Atlantic Studios and Sterling Sound. Inside Story is notable for being Jones' first foray into production, which resulted in frequent, heated clashes with Rodgers. Musically, the album explores varieties of pop music, with elements of jazz, gospel and Caribbean sounds, marking the point when Jones turned towards a more accessible, commercial sound. All songs were written by Grace Jones and Bruce Woolley. The artwork for the album was designed by Richard Bernstein, who had previously worked with Jones on artwork for the '70s albums Portfolio, Fame and Muse.

The release of Inside Story was surrounded by Manhattan Records' "most extensive marketing and merchandising campaign ever", as described by Billboard. The promotional strategy would include magazine and newspaper advertisements, street posters, radio spots and more, with the record company targeting the US market, where Grace had never been a mainstream pop star. Eventually, Inside Story would become one of Jones' greatest album successes, making the top 40 in a number of European countries. Despite being her lowest-charting album in the UK, it still sold well enough in the British market to be certified silver there. The album also remains her last entry to date on the US Billboard 200 albums chart.

A remastered, copy protected edition of the album was released in 2004 on EMI Records, along with Bulletproof Heart. Unlike the latter, the re-released Inside Story came with no bonus tracks.

In her 2015 memoir I'll Never Write My Memoirs, Jones stated: "When I listen to Inside Story, I can hear the energy of what was going on the moment it was made. [...] It's where I was at the time. Nile's ear was different from mine, and he was responding to his idea of me, and it was an American Nile production, with all that entails, but I think it is beautiful. There were other ways of doing that material, but I like how it ended up. I don't listen to all my records, but I play that one a lot, because it is interesting to hear what Nile was thinking."

== Singles ==
"I'm Not Perfect (But I'm Perfect for You)" became the album's lead single, accompanied by a popular music video. The song would become one of Jones' most successful singles and her highest (as well as last) entry on Billboard Hot 100. "Party Girl" was released at the end of 1986 to very modest success, only making the top 40 in Italy.

The third single was different for the North American and European markets. The R&B-influenced "Crush" was chosen for the US and Canada, while the European market received the jazzy "Victor Should Have Been a Jazz Musician". Neither single, released in spring 1987, achieved chart success.

== Track listing ==
All tracks are written by Grace Jones and Bruce Woolley.

Side one
No.	Title	Length
1.	"I'm Not Perfect (But I'm Perfect for You)"	3:57
2.	"Hollywood Liar"	3:50
3.	"Chan Hitchhikes to Shanghai"	4:33
4.	"Victor Should Have Been a Jazz Musician"	4:42
5.	"Party Girl"	3:44

Side two
No.	Title	Length
6.	"Crush"	3:27
7.	"Barefoot in Beverly Hills"	4:07
8.	"Scary But Fun"	3:55
9.	"White Collar Crime"	4:59
10.	"Inside Story"	4:31

== Personnel ==
- Scott Ansell – sound engineering
- Richard Bernstein – computer image
- Knut Bohn – engineering
- Greg Calbi – mastering
- Barry Diament – digital editing
- Steve Elson – baritone saxophone, flute
- James Farber – recording, mixing
- Mac Gollehon – trumpet
- Stan Harrison – alto saxophone
- Grace Jones – vocals, production
- Kevin Jones – digital interfacing, sequencing, drum programming
- Lenny Pickett – tenor saxophone
- Nile Rodgers – production, arrangements
- Budd Tunick – production managing
- Bruce Woolley – arrangements

== Charts ==
Weekly chart performance for Inside Story
Chart (1986–1987)	Peak position
Australian Albums (Kent Music Report)	51
Austrian Albums (Ö3 Austria)	15
European Albums (Music & Media)	29
Finnish Albums (Suomen virallinen lista)	25
German Albums (Offizielle Top 100)	38
New Zealand Albums (RMNZ)	12
Swedish Albums (Sverigetopplistan)	34
Swiss Albums (Schweizer Hitparade)	30
UK Albums (Official Charts)	61
US Billboard 200	81
US Top R&B/Hip-Hop Albums (Billboard)	26

== Certifications ==
Certifications for Inside Story
Region	Certification	Certified units/sales
United Kingdom (BPI)	Silver	60,000^{^}
^{^} Shipments figures based on certification alone.

== Release history ==
Region	Year	Format(s)	Label
Various	1986	LP; CD; cassette	Manhattan
Yugoslavia	1987	LP	Jugoton, Manhattan
Europe	2004	CD	EMI
