= Crush (Grace Jones song) =

Single by Grace Jones

from the album Inside Story
- B-side: "White Collar Crime"
- Released: March 1987
- Recorded: 1986
- Studio: Skyline Studios (New York, NY)
- Genre: Pop; freestyle
- Length: 3:28
- Label: Manhattan Records
- Songwriter(s): Grace Jones; Bruce Woolley
- Producer(s): Grace Jones; Nile Rodgers

Grace Jones singles chronology
"Party Girl" (1986)	"Crush" (1987)	"Victor Should Have Been a Jazz Musician" (1987)

"Crush" is a 1987 single by Grace Jones.

== Background ==
The song was the third single from Grace Jones' album Inside Story, chosen for the North America whereas Europe opted for "Victor Should Have Been a Jazz Musician". The single was also released in an extended 12" version, yet to be released on CD, with "White Collar Crime" on the B-side.

== Track listing ==
- 7" single

A. "Crush" – 3:22
B. "White Collar Crime" – 4:59

- 12" single

A. "Crush" (extended remix) – 8:09
B1. "Crush" (dub) – 6:21
B2. "White Collar Crime" – 4:59

- 12" promotional single

A. "Crush" (extended remix) – 8:09
B1. "Crush" (dub) – 6:21
B2. "Crush" (7" version) – 4:59

== Chart performance ==
Chart (1986)	Peak position
US Dance Club Songs (Billboard)	32
