= RuPaul's Drag Race All Stars season 8 =

2023 season of RuPaul's Drag Race All Stars

RuPaul's Drag Race All Stars
- Season 8
- Promotional poster for season 8
- Hosted by: RuPaul
- Judges: RuPaul; Michelle Visage; Carson Kressley; Ross Mathews; Ts Madison
- No. of contestants: 12
- Winner: Jimbo
- Runner-up: Kandy Muse
- Queen of the Fame Games: LaLa Ri
- Companion show: RuPaul's Drag Race All Stars: Untucked!
- No. of episodes: 12

Release
- Original network: Paramount+; WOW Presents Plus
- Original release: May 12 – July 21, 2023

Season chronology
- ← Previous; Season 7 Next → Season 9

The eighth season of RuPaul's Drag Race All Stars premiered on Paramount+ on May 12, 2023. The series continues with RuPaul as host and judge, with returning judges Michelle Visage, Carson Kressley, and Ross Mathews joined by Ts Madison on the judging panel. The season's premiere date was announced in a brief teaser trailer aired during the finale of the fifteenth season of RuPaul's Drag Race. The cast was revealed on April 20.

The season features a new twist to the show's format: In addition to competing for a spot in the Drag Race Hall of Fame, a parallel competition for the title of "Queen of the Fame Games" took place. Over the course of the season, runway looks from the eliminated contestants were shown during Untucked, and at the end of the season, fans voted for one eliminated queen to win a $60,000 prize (originally announced as $50,000).

The winner of the eighth season of RuPaul's Drag Race All Stars was Jimbo. Kandy Muse was the runner-up. LaLa Ri won the "Queen of the Fame Games" title.

== Contestants ==
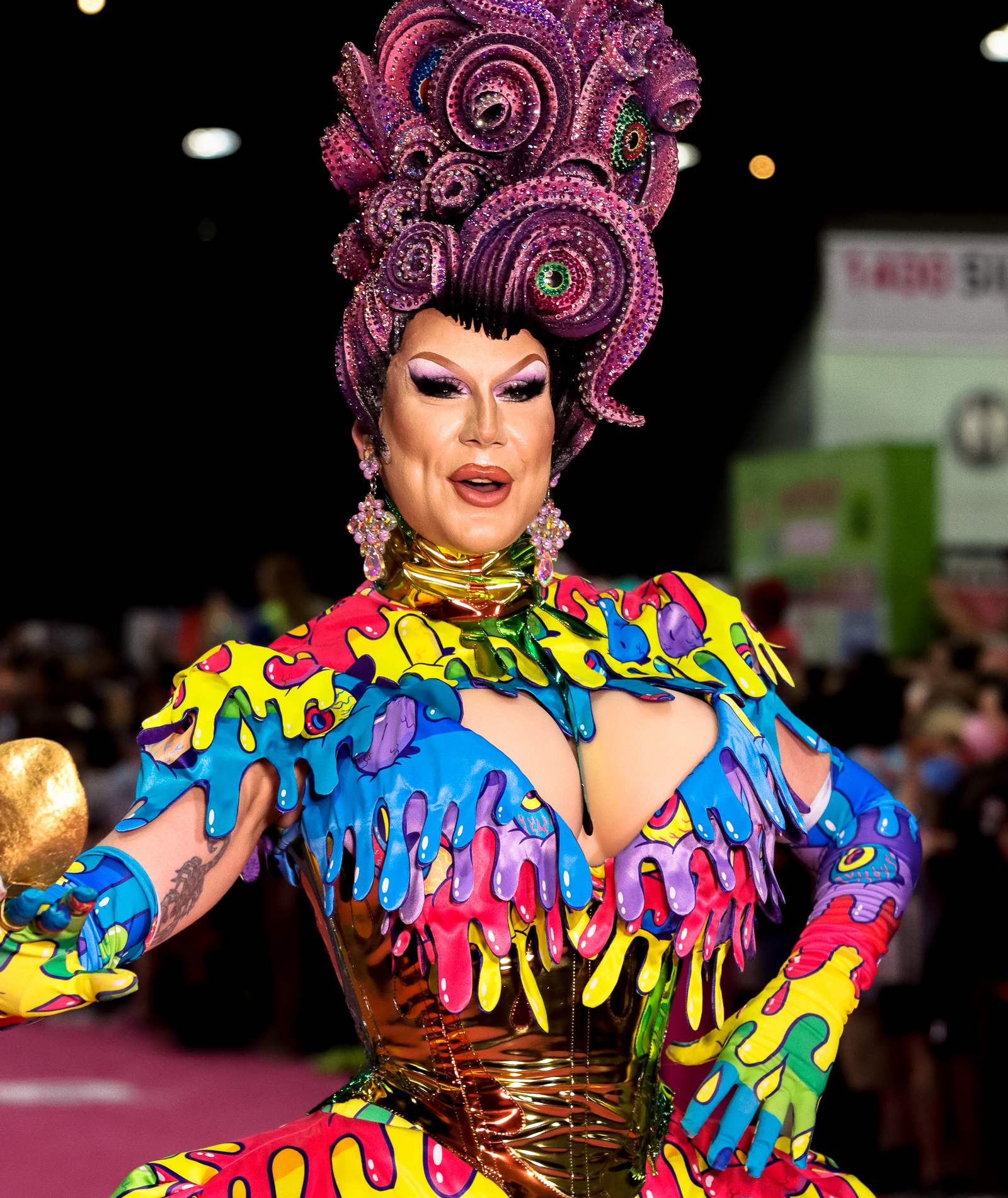
The winner, Jimbo

Ages, names, and cities stated are at time of filming.

Contestants of RuPaul's Drag Race All Stars season 8 and their backgrounds
Contestant	Age	Hometown	Original season(s)	Original placement(s)	Outcome
Jimbo	39	Victoria, Canada	Canada season 1	4th place	Winner
Jimbo	39	Victoria, Canada	UK vs. the World series 1	7th place	Winner
Kandy Muse	27	New York City, New York	Season 13	Runner-up	Runner-up
Jessica Wild	42	Boston, Massachusetts	Season 2	6th place	3rd place
Alexis Michelle	38	New York City, New York	Season 9	5th place	4th place
LaLa Ri	31	Atlanta, Georgia	Season 13	10th place (Note: The contestant was voted Miss Congeniality on her original season.)	5th place (Note: LaLa Ri was crowned the "Queen of the Fame Games".)
Kahanna Montrese	28	Las Vegas, Nevada	Season 11	14th place	6th place
Jaymes Mansfield	32	Las Vegas, Nevada	Season 9	14th place	7th place
Heidi N Closet	27	Los Angeles, California	Season 12	6th place	8th place (Note: Heidi N Closet quit the competition prior to the runway and judges' critiques.)
Darienne Lake (Note: Miss Darienne Lake is referred to as Darienne Lake on the show.)	50	Rochester, New York	Season 6	4th place	9th place
Mrs. Kasha Davis	51	Rochester, New York	Season 7	11th place	10th place
Naysha Lopez	37	Los Angeles, California	Season 8	9th place	11th place
Monica Beverly Hillz	37	Chicago, Illinois	Season 5	12th place	12th place

== Contestant progress ==
Legend:

Jimbo won RuPaul's Drag Race All Stars season 8.
Kandy Muse was the runner-up.
LaLa Ri was awarded the Queen of the Fame Games (QFG) title.
WIN indicates that the contestant won the challenge and the Lip Sync for Your Legacy.
TOP indicates that the contestant won the challenge, but lost the Lip Sync for Your Legacy.
TSW (Talent Show Winner) indicates that the eliminated contestant won the Fame Games Variety Extravaganza and earned the chance of multiplying their Fame Games votes by 2, 3 or 5.
SAFE indicates that the contestant was declared safe by the judges.
BTM (Bottom) indicates that the contestant was up for elimination.
ELIM (Eliminated) indicates that the contestant was eliminated.
QUIT indicates that Heidi N Closet quit the competition.
FAME indicates that the eliminated contestant performed in the Fame Games Variety Extravaganza, but did not win the challenge.
Guest indicates that the contestant appeared as a guest.

Contestants progress with placements in each episode
Contestant	Episode											
Contestant	1	2	3	4	5	6	7	8	9	10	11	12
Jimbo	SAFE	TOP	SAFE	TOP	TOP	SAFE	SAFE	SAFE	WIN	BTM	Guest	Winner
Kandy Muse	SAFE	SAFE	SAFE	SAFE	SAFE	WIN	SAFE	BTM	BTM	TOP	Guest	Runner-up
Jessica Wild	SAFE	SAFE	WIN	SAFE	BTM	SAFE	SAFE	SAFE	BTM	ELIM	FAME	Guest
Alexis Michelle	SAFE	SAFE	SAFE	BTM	SAFE	SAFE	BTM	WIN	ELIM		FAME	Guest
LaLa Ri	SAFE	SAFE	SAFE	SAFE	SAFE	SAFE	WIN	ELIM			TSW	QFG
Kahanna Montrese	TOP	BTM	SAFE	SAFE	BTM	BTM	ELIM				FAME	Guest
Jaymes Mansfield	SAFE	SAFE	SAFE	BTM	SAFE	ELIM					TSW	Guest
Heidi N Closet	SAFE	SAFE	SAFE	SAFE	QUIT							
Darienne Lake	BTM	SAFE	BTM	ELIM							FAME	Guest
Mrs. Kasha Davis	SAFE	SAFE	ELIM								FAME	Guest
Naysha Lopez	SAFE	ELIM									FAME	Guest
Monica Beverly Hillz	ELIM										FAME	Guest

== Lip syncs ==
Legend:

The contestant was eliminated after their first time in the bottom.
The contestant was eliminated after their second time in the bottom.
The contestant was eliminated after their third time in the bottom.
The contestant was eliminated after their fourth time in the bottom.
The contestants won the Lip Sync for Your Legacy and the opportunity to multiply their Fame Games vote total.
The contestant won the Lip Sync for the Crown and was declared the winner of the season.

Episode	Top All Star (Elimination)	vs.	Lip Sync Assassin (Elimination)	Song	Winner	Bottom	Eliminated
1	Kahanna Montrese (Monica)	vs.	Aja (Monica)	"Freakum Dress" (Beyoncé)	Aja	Darienne, Monica	Monica Beverly Hillz
2	Jimbo (Naysha)	vs.	Pangina Heals (Naysha)	"She Bop" (Cyndi Lauper)	Pangina Heals	Kahanna, Naysha	Naysha Lopez
3	Jessica Wild (Kasha)	vs.	Ra'Jah O'Hara (Kasha)	"Coconuts" (Kim Petras)	Jessica Wild	Darienne, Kasha	Mrs. Kasha Davis
4	Jimbo (Darienne)	vs.	Shannel (Darienne)	"Bad Reputation" (Joan Jett)	Shannel	Alexis, Darienne, Jaymes	Darienne Lake
5	Jimbo (Kahanna)	vs.	Jasmine Kennedie (Kahanna)	"Hallucinate" (Dua Lipa)	Jasmine Kennedie	Jessica, Kahanna	None (Note: On episode 5, because of Heidi N Closet quitting the competition, RuPaul announced that neither of the bottom two queens would be eliminated.)
6	Kandy Muse (Jaymes)	vs.	Angeria Paris VanMicheals (Jaymes)	"I'm Not Perfect (But I'm Perfect for You)" (Grace Jones)	Kandy Muse	Jaymes, Kahanna	Jaymes Mansfield
7	LaLa Ri (Kahanna)	vs.	Jorgeous (Kahanna)	"About Damn Time" (Lizzo)	LaLa Ri	Alexis, Kahanna	Kahanna Montrese
8	Alexis Michelle (LaLa)	vs.	Nicky Doll (LaLa)	"These Boots Are Made for Walkin'" (Nancy Sinatra)	Alexis Michelle	Kandy, LaLa	LaLa Ri
9	Jimbo (Alexis)	vs.	Silky Nutmeg Ganache (Alexis)	"Freak-A-Zoid" (Midnight Star)	Jimbo	Alexis, Jessica, Kandy	Alexis Michelle
10	Kandy Muse (Jessica)	vs.	Priyanka (Jessica, Jimbo)	"Jumpin', Jumpin'" (Destiny's Child)	Priyanka	Jessica, Jimbo	Jessica Wild
Episode	Top All Stars			Song	Winners		
11	Jaymes Mansfield	vs.	LaLa Ri	"Rain on Me" (Lady Gaga, Ariana Grande)	Jaymes Mansfield		
11	Jaymes Mansfield	vs.	LaLa Ri	"Rain on Me" (Lady Gaga, Ariana Grande)	LaLa Ri		
Episode	Final All Stars			Song	Winner		
12	Jimbo	vs.	Kandy Muse	"Do Ya Wanna Funk" (Sylvester, Patrick Cowley)	Jimbo		

== Voting history ==
Legend:

The Top All Star won the Lip Sync for Your Legacy.
The Lip Sync Assassin won the Lip Sync for Your Legacy.
The Lip Sync Assassin won the Lip Sync for Your Legacy but, due to a tie in the group's vote, the Top All Star determined the elimination.
The contestant was up for elimination.
The contestant was eliminated.
The elimination was determined by the Top All Star, having won the Lip Sync for Your Legacy.
The elimination was determined by the group's vote, having the Lip Sync Assassin won the Lip Sync for Your Legacy.
The elimination was determined by the Top All Star due to a tie in the group's vote after the Lip Sync Assassin won the Lip Sync for Your Legacy.

Summary of weekly voting and results
Episode	1	2	3	4	5	6	7	8	9	10
Deciding vote	Group	Group	Jessica	Group	Group	Kandy	LaLa Ri	Alexis	Jimbo	Kandy
Jimbo	Monica	~~Naysha~~	~~Darienne~~	~~Darienne~~	~~Kahanna~~	~~Jaymes~~	~~Kahanna~~	~~LaLa Ri~~	Alexis	Jessica
Kandy	Darienne	Naysha	~~Kasha~~	Darienne	Kahanna	Jaymes	~~Kahanna~~	~~LaLa Ri~~	~~Alexis~~	Jessica
Jessica	Monica	Kahanna	Kasha	Darienne	Kahanna	~~Jaymes~~	~~Kahanna~~	~~LaLa Ri~~	~~Alexis~~	Jimbo
Alexis	Monica	Naysha	~~Kasha~~	Darienne	Kahanna	~~Jaymes~~	~~Kahanna~~	LaLa Ri	~~Jessica~~	
LaLa Ri	Darienne	Naysha	~~Kasha~~	Darienne	Kahanna	~~Jaymes~~	Kahanna	~~Kandy~~		
Kahanna	~~Monica~~	Naysha	~~Kasha~~	Darienne	Jessica	~~Jaymes~~	~~Alexis~~			
Jaymes	Darienne	Naysha	~~Darienne~~	Darienne	Kahanna	~~Kahanna~~				
Heidi	Monica	Naysha	~~Darienne~~	Darienne	—N/a					
Darienne	Monica	Naysha	~~Kasha~~	Jaymes						
Kasha	Monica	Kahanna	~~Darienne~~							
Naysha	Monica	Kahanna								
Monica	Darienne									
Eliminated	Monica	Naysha	Kasha	Darienne	None (Note: Because Heidi N Closet quit the competition previously in the episode, RuPaul announced that neither of the bottom two would be eliminated.)	Jaymes	Kahanna	LaLa Ri	Alexis	Jessica

== Guest judges ==
On April 27, the celebrity guest judges for this season were revealed:

- Idina Menzel, singer and actress
- Robin Thede, comedian, writer, and actress
- JoJo Siwa, dancer, actress, and Internet personality
- Maude Apatow, actress
- Bowen Yang, comedian, actor, writer, and podcaster
- Matt Rogers, comedian, actor, writer, and podcaster
- Adam Shankman, director, producer, choreographer, TV personality
- Javicia Leslie, actress
- Brandon Boyd, singer, musician, and visual artist
- Thom Filicia, TV host and interior designer
- Zooey Deschanel, actress and musician
- Ego Nwodim, comedian and actress

=== Special guests ===
Guests who appeared in episodes, but did not judge on the main stage.

Episode 1:

- Raven, runner-up of both RuPaul's Drag Race Season 2 and All Stars 1

Episode 2:

- Bobby Moynihan, actor and comedian

Episode 6:

- Leland, songwriter and producer

Episode 8:

- Raven, runner-up of both RuPaul's Drag Race Season 2 and All Stars 1
- Shannel, contestant of both RuPaul's Drag Race Season 1 and All Stars 1

Episode 9:

- Alec Mapa, actor and comedian
- Katya, contestant on RuPaul's Drag Race Season 7 and runner-up of All Stars 2

Episode 11:

- Sunday Riley, president of Sunday Riley Cosmetics

Episode 12:

- Miguel Zarate, choreographer

== Episodes ==
No. overall	No. in season	Title	Original release date
66	1	"The Fame Games"	May 12, 2023
For the first mini-challenge, the contestants model two looks on the runway: one inspired by fame in the past and one inspired by fame of the present. For the main challenge, the contestants write and perform an original verse to a disco or glam-rock rendition of "Money, Success, Fame, Glamour".: Team Fame Tarts: Alexis Michelle, Darienne Lake, Heidi N Closet, Kahanna Montrese, Kandy Muse and Naysha Lopez; Team Glitter Chicks: Jaymes Mansfield, Jessica Wild, Jimbo, LaLa Ri, Monica Beverly Hillz and Mrs. Kasha Davis; On the runway, category is "Famous Forever: Your Timeless Signature Drag". Alexis Michelle, Jaymes Mansfield, Kahanna Montrese, and LaLa Ri receive positive critiques, with Kahanna Montrese being the top all star. Darienne Lake and Monica Beverly Hillz receive negative critiques, and are the bottom two contestants. RuPaul's Drag Race Season 9 and All Stars 3 contestant Aja is revealed to be the lip-sync assassin. Aja and Kahanna Montrese lip-sync to "Freakum Dress" by Beyoncé. Aja wins the lip-sync and reveals that the group has chosen to eliminate Monica Beverly Hillz. RuPaul then reveals that all the eliminated queens will partake in a new sub-contest, the online Fame Games, where fans will vote on their favorite outfit that an eliminated contestant didn't get to use during the competition. The winning contestant will be crowned Queen of the Fame Games and win $50,000.: Guest Judge: Idina Menzel; Alternating Judge: Ross Mathews; Mini-Challenge: Model two looks on the runway, one inspired by fame in the past and one inspired by fame of the present; Main Challenge: Write and perform an original verse to a disco or glam-rock rendition of "Money, Success, Fame, Glamour"; Runway Theme: Famous Forever: Your Timeless Signature Drag; Challenge Winner: Kahanna Montrese; Challenge Prize: $5,000; Lip-Sync Assassin: Aja; Lip-Sync Song: "Freakum Dress" by Beyoncé; Lip Sync for Your Legacy Winner: Aja; Bottom Two: Darienne Lake and Monica Beverly Hillz; Eliminated: Monica Beverly Hillz; Farewell Message: "Stay true to yourself. Love you All -♡- M.B.H."
67	2	"It's RDR Live!"	May 12, 2023
The queens perform in a sketch comedy performance of RDR Live. On the runway, category is "Net Gala". Heidi N Closet, Jaymes Mansfield, and Jimbo receive positive critiques, and Jimbo is the top all star. Kahanna Montrese and Naysha Lopez receive negative critiques, and are the bottom two queens. Drag Race Thailand co-host and RuPaul's Drag Race: UK Versus the World contestant Pangina Heals is revealed to be the lip-sync assassin. Jimbo and Pangina Heals lip-sync to "She Bop" by Cyndi Lauper. Pangina Heals wins the lip-sync and reveals that the group has chosen to eliminate Naysha Lopez.: Guest Judge: Robin Thede; Alternating Judge: Carson Kressley; Main Challenge: Perform in a sketch comedy of RDR Live; Runway Theme: Net Gala; Challenge Winner: Jimbo; Challenge Prize: $5,000; Lip-Sync Assassin: Pangina Heals; Lip-Sync Song: "She Bop" by Cyndi Lauper; Lip Sync for Your Legacy Winner: Pangina Heals; Bottom Two: Kahanna Montrese and Naysha Lopez; Eliminated: Naysha Lopez; Farewell Message: "God has a different plan for me and that's fine by me. Have fun and love you all. XO Naysha P.S. I'm still prettier than all of you."
68	3	"The Supermarket Ball"	May 19, 2023
The queens present three looks on the runway for the Supermarket Ball: "Legen-dairy Queens", "Fruity Patootie", and "Supermarket Supermodel Eleganza". On the runway, Jessica Wild, Jimbo, Kandy Muse, and LaLa Ri receive positive critiques, and Jessica is the top all star. Darienne Lake and Mrs. Kasha Davis receive negative critiques, and are the bottom two queens. Season 11 and All Stars 6 contestant and Canada's Drag Race vs the World winner Ra'Jah O'Hara is revealed to be the lip-sync assassin. Jessica and Ra'Jah lip-sync to "Coconuts" by Kim Petras. Jessica wins the lip-sync and eliminates Mrs. Kasha Davis from the competition.: Guest Judge: Jojo Siwa; Alternating Judge: Ts Madison; Main Challenge: The Supermarket Ball; Runway Theme: Legen-dairy Queens, Fruity Patootie, and Supermarket Supermodel Eleganza; Challenge Winner: Jessica Wild; Challenge Prize: $5,000; Lip-Sync Assassin: Ra'Jah O'Hara; Lip-Sync Song: "Coconuts" by Kim Petras; Lip Sync for Your Legacy Winner: Jessica Wild; Bottom Two: Darienne Lake and Mrs. Kasha Davis; Eliminated: Mrs. Kasha Davis; Farewell Message: "Look in your eyes and say I love you daily. Love you all, Ms. Kasha."
69	4	"Screen Queens"	May 26, 2023
In three groups, the queens create and star in scripted TV series trailers, directed by Michelle Visage. On the runway, category is "Ass the World Turns". Team "Best Friends 4 Never" (Jessica Wild, Kandy Muse, and Jimbo) receives positive critiques, with Jimbo being the top all star. Team "Get Off Island" (Alexis Michelle, Darienne Lake, and Jaymes Mansfield) receives negative critiques, and are the bottom three queens. Season 1 contestant and All Stars 1 finalist Shannel is revealed as the lip-sync assassin. Jimbo and Shannel lip-sync to "Bad Reputation" by Joan Jett. Shannel wins the lip-sync and reveals that the group has chosen to eliminate Darienne Lake.: Guest Judge: Maude Apatow; Alternating Judge: Ts Madison; Main Challenge: Star in a sickening scripted TV series trailer; Runway Theme: Ass The World Turns; Challenge Winner: Jimbo; Challenge Prize: $5,000; Lip-Sync Assassin: Shannel; Lip-Sync Song: "Bad Reputation" by Joan Jett; Lip Sync for Your Legacy Winner: Shannel; Bottom Three: Alexis Michelle, Darienne Lake, and Jaymes Mansfield; Eliminated: Darienne Lake; Farewell Message: "Darienne was here twice! Love & laughs. See you soon? Miss Lake"
70	5	"Snatch Game of Love"	June 2, 2023
The queens play the Snatch Game of Love. The first group plays with Matt Rogers: Heidi N Closet portrays Blackbeard; Jaymes Mansfield portrays Jennifer Coolidge; Jessica Wild portrays Iris Chacón; Kahanna Montrese portrays Coco Montrese; The second group plays with Bowen Yang: Alexis Michelle portrays Bea Arthur; Jimbo portrays Shirley Temple; Kandy Muse portrays Renee Graziano; LaLa Ri portrays Sukihana; While getting ready for the runway, Heidi N Closet makes the decision to quit the competition. On the runway, category is "RuVeal Yourself". Alexis Michelle, Jaymes Mansfield, and Jimbo receive positive critiques, and Jimbo is the top all star. Jessica Wild and Kahanna Montrese receive negative critiques, and are the bottom two contestants. Season 14 contestant Jasmine Kennedie is revealed as the lip sync assassin. Jasmine and Jimbo lip-sync to "Hallucinate" by Dua Lipa. Jasmine wins the lip sync. Because of Heidi N Closet's departure, neither of the bottom two is eliminated.: Guest Judges: Bowen Yang and Matt Rogers; Alternating Judge: Ross Mathews; Main Challenge: Snatch Game of Love; Quit: Heidi N Closet; Farewell Message: "Sending y'all so much love. ♡ Stay fab, stay beautiful, and stay supple. XOXO Heidi N Closet PS Whats said in the dark comes to the light ♡"; Runway Theme: RuVeal Yourself; Challenge Winner: Jimbo; Challenge Prize: $5,000; Lip-Sync Assassin: Jasmine Kennedie; Lip-Sync Song: "Hallucinate" by Dua Lipa; Lip Sync for Your Legacy Winner: Jasmine Kennedie; Bottom Two: Jessica Wild and Kahanna Montrese; Eliminated: None
71	6	"Joan: The Unauthorized Rusical!"	June 9, 2023
The queens record and perform a rusical inspired by the life and career of Joan Crawford as well as the biographical film Mommie Dearest. During preparations they record their vocals with music producer Leland and learn choreography from guest judge Adam Shankman. On the runway category is "Night of 1,000 Grace Joneses". Jessica Wild, Kandy Muse, and LaLa Ri receive positive critiques, and Kandy is the top all star. Jaymes Mansfield and Kahanna Montrese receive negative critiques, and are the bottom two contestants. Season 14 contestant Angeria Paris VanMicheals is revealed as the lip sync assassin. Angeria and Kandy lip-sync to "I'm Not Perfect (But I'm Perfect for You)" by Grace Jones. Kandy wins the lip sync and eliminates Jaymes Mansfield from the competition.: Guest Judge: Adam Shankman; Alternating Judge: Ts Madison; Main Challenge: JOAN: The Unauthorized Rusical!; Runway Theme: Night of 1,000 Grace Joneses; Challenge Winner: Kandy Muse; Challenge Prize: $5,000; Lip-Sync Assassin: Angeria Paris VanMicheals; Lip-Sync Song: "I'm Not Perfect (But I'm Perfect for You)" by Grace Jones; Lip Sync for Your Legacy Winner: Kandy Muse; Bottom Two: Jaymes Mansfield and Kahanna Montrese; Eliminated: Jaymes Mansfield; Farewell Message: "I shit in one of your spots. Good luck. Love you all, Jaymes Mansfield."
72	7	"Forensic Queens"	June 16, 2023
The queens improvise in the true crime spoof "Forensic Queens: Wha-Ha-Happened to Lil' Poundcake?", which follows the disappearance of season 5 "contestant" Lil' Poundcake on a fictional season of All Stars.: Alexis Michelle plays Effie Lee Bailey, the district attorney; Jessica Wild plays Ura Dragg, one of Lil' Poundcake's All Stars competitors; Jimbo plays Eva Dentz, the forensic examiner; Kahanna Montrese plays Imma Foxx, one of Lil' Poundcake's All Stars competitors; Kandy Muse plays Anita Klew, the investigating detective; LaLa Ri plays Shari Coleman, the production's security guard; On the runway category is "Miss Fill-in-the-Blank".: Alexis Michelle is Miss Manpig; Jessica Wild is Miss Sausage Party; Jimbo is Miss Tits Magee; Kahanna Montrese is Miss Tired Ass Showgirl; Kandy Muse is Miss Arrogant; LaLa Ri is Miss Bootlegger; Jessica Wild, Jimbo, and LaLa Ri receive positive critiques, and LaLa is the top all star. Alexis Michelle, Kahanna Montrese, and Kandy Muse receive negative critiques, and Alexis and Kahanna are declared the bottom two contestants. Season 14 contestant Jorgeous is revealed as the lip sync assassin. Jorgeous and LaLa lip-sync to "About Damn Time" by Lizzo. LaLa wins the lip sync and eliminates Kahanna Montrese from the competition.: Guest Judge: Javicia Leslie; Alternating Judge: Carson Kressley; Main Challenge: Improvise in the true-crime spoof "Forensic Queens: Wha-Ha-Happened to Lil' Poundcake?"; Runway Theme: Miss Fill-in-the-Blank; Challenge Winner: LaLa Ri; Challenge Prize: $5,000; Lip-Sync Assassin: Jorgeous; Lip-Sync Song: "About Damn Time" by Lizzo; Lip Sync for Your Legacy Winner: LaLa Ri; Bottom Two: Alexis Michelle and Kahanna Montrese; Eliminated: Kahanna Montrese; Farewell Message: "I adore ALL of you, this has changed me forever! Love Kahanna XO"
73	8	"You're a Winner, Baby!"	June 23, 2023
RuPaul challenges the queens to create looks worthy of the Drag Race Hall of Fame, inspired by past All Stars champions. Drag Race legends Raven and Shannel bring some style guidance to the workroom. Rock royalty, Incubus frontman Brandon Boyd joins the judges panel. The Pit Crew rolls out several boxes labelled with the names of previous All Stars winners, with materials inspired by each winner inside. As the winner of the last episode, LaLa Ri assigns the boxes to the queens.: Alexis Michelle is given the box labelled Trinity the Tuck; Jessica Wild is given the box labelled Kylie Sonique Love; Jimbo is given the box labelled Trixie Mattel; Kandy Muse is given the box labelled Monet X Change; LaLa Ri chooses the box labelled Shea Coulee; On the runway, category is "I'm A Winner Baby". Alexis Michelle, Jimbo and Jessica Wild receive positive critiques, and Alexis is the top all star. LaLa Ri and Kandy Muse receive negative critiques and are declared the bottom two contestants. Season 12 contestant and Drag Race France host Nicky Doll is revealed as the lip sync assassin. Nicky and Alexis lip-sync to "These Boots Are Made for Walkin'" by Nancy Sinatra. Alexis wins the lip sync and eliminates LaLa Ri from the competition.: Guest Judge: Brandon Boyd; Alternating Judge: Ross Mathews; Main Challenge: Transform materials into your own signature look that screams "I'm a Winner, Baby!"; Runway Theme: I'm A Winner Baby; Challenge Winner: Alexis Michelle; Challenge Prize: $5,000; Lip-Sync Assassin: Nicky Doll; Lip-Sync Song: "These Boots Are Made for Walkin'" by Nancy Sinatra; Lip Sync for Your Legacy Winner: Alexis Michelle; Bottom Two: Kandy Muse and LaLa Ri; Eliminated: LaLa Ri; Farewell Message: "Baby! I had the time of my life. I love y'all! XOXO LaLa Ri. I'm stealing everything!"
74	9	"Carson Kressley, This Is Your Gay Life!"	June 30, 2023
The queens will have a roast of Carson Kressley, the judges, and the fellow queens in front of a live audience. On the runway, category is "Snow Bunny". Jimbo is announced the top all star. RuPaul then announces from here on out, if you are not the top all star of the week, you are the bottom all-star and are at risk of getting eliminated. Season 11, All Stars 6 and Canada's Drag Race vs the World contestant Silky Nutmeg Ganache is revealed to be the lip-sync assassin. Jimbo and Silky lip-sync to "Freak-A-Zoid" by Midnight Star. Jimbo wins the lip sync and eliminates Alexis Michelle from the competition.: Guest Judge: Thom Filicia; Alternating Judge: Carson Kressley; Main Challenge: A roast of Carson Kressley; Runway Theme: Snow Bunny; Challenge Winner: Jimbo; Challenge Prize: $5,000; Lip-Sync Assassin: Silky Nutmeg Ganache; Lip-Sync Song: "Freak-A-Zoid" by Midnight Star; Lip Sync for Your Legacy Winner: Jimbo; Bottom Three: Alexis Michelle, Jessica Wild, and Kandy Muse; Eliminated: Alexis Michelle; Farewell Message: "You're my sisters always. XOXO Miss Manpig '23"
75	10	"The Letter L"	July 7, 2023
For this week's mini-challenge the queens must put together looks inspired by Jean Paul Gaultier perfume bottles and model them in a photoshoot. Jessica Wild is declared the mini-challenge winner. For the main challenge the queens are tasked with putting lesbians in drag as well as choreographing duo lip-sync performances to a medley of RuPaul songs. On the runway, category is "Drag Family Resemblance". Kandy is declared the top all star of the week, leaving Jessica and Jimbo as the bottom two. Canada's Drag Race season 1 winner Priyanka is revealed to be the lip-sync assassin. Kandy and Priyanka lip-sync to "Jumpin', Jumpin'" by Destiny's Child. Priyanka wins the lip-sync and the $10,000 cash tip is added to the season's Fame Games prize, raising that amount to $60,000. Priyanka reveals that the group vote is tied, meaning that Kandy is the deciding vote. Kandy eliminates Jessica Wild from the competition.: Guest Judge: Zooey Deschanel; Alternating Judge: Carson Kressley; Mini-Challenge: Design and model a look based on a Jean Paul Gaultier perfume bottle; Mini-Challenge Winner: Jessica Wild; Mini-Challenge Prize: $2,500; Main Challenge: Give lesbians drag makeovers; Runway Theme: Drag Family Resemblance; Challenge Winner: Kandy Muse; Challenge Prize: $5,000; Lip-Sync Assassin: Priyanka; Lip-Sync Song: "Jumpin', Jumpin'" by Destiny's Child; Lip Sync for Your Legacy Winner: Priyanka; Bottom Two: Jessica Wild and Jimbo; Eliminated: Jessica Wild; Farewell Message: "Love you girls with all my heart. So proud of you Top 2! Kandy Muse Puerto Rico y Rep Dom estamos orgullosos de ti."
76	11	"The Fame Games Variety Extravaganza"	July 14, 2023
The eliminated queens (minus Heidi N Closet) return to participate in a variety show, where they will compete for a chance to multiply their Fame Games fan vote total. Jimbo and Kandy Muse host the show and exhibit their talents but do not compete in the episode. Prior to the variety show the queens participate in a reading mini-challenge which is won by Mrs. Kasha Davis. The variety show acts are: Monica Beverly Hillz – Original song lip-sync; Naysha Lopez – Flamenco dance; Mrs. Kasha Davis – Protest lip-sync; Darienne Lake – Stand-up comedy; Jaymes Mansfield – Comedy lip-sync; Kahanna Montrese – Original song lip-sync / Cheerleading routine; LaLa Ri – Original song lip-sync; Alexis Michelle – Live singing / Burlesque routine; Jessica Wild – Original song lip-sync; Jimbo – Striptease / Making a sundae; Kandy Muse – Original song lip-sync; After the show the eliminated queens each receive largely positive critiques. Jaymes Mansfield and LaLa Ri are ultimately declared the top all stars of the week. Jaymes and LaLa lip-sync to "Rain on Me" by Lady Gaga and Ariana Grande. Both are declared the winner of the lip-sync and a wheel with potential multipliers 2x, 3x, and 5x is spun for each. Jaymes receives a 2x multiplier while LaLa receives a 3x multiplier.: Guest Judge: Ego Nwodim; Alternating Judge: Ross Mathews; Mini-Challenge: Reading is Fundamental; Mini-Challenge Winner: Mrs. Kasha Davis; Mini-Challenge Prize: $2,500; Main Challenge: Fame Games Variety Extravaganza; Top Two: Jaymes Mansfield and LaLa Ri; Lip-Sync Song: "Rain on Me" by Lady Gaga and Ariana Grande; Lip Sync for Your Legacy Winners: Jaymes Mansfield and LaLa Ri; Fame Games Vote Multipliers: 2x for Jaymes Mansfield and 3x for LaLa Ri
77	12	"Grand Finale"	July 21, 2023
For the final maxi-challenge of the season Jimbo and Kandy Muse will each learn choreography and lip-sync to an original song written for them: "I Remember Being Born" for Jimbo and "Pay Me in Money" for Kandy Muse. During preparations Jimbo and Kandy also have Tic-Tac talks with RuPaul and Michelle Visage. The eliminated queens who participated in the Variety Extravaganza last week all appear again and have the opportunity to participate in the week's final runway. On the runway, category is "Finale Fabulosity". After the runway and final critiques for Jimbo and Kandy, LaLa is named "Queen of the Fame Games" and wins the associated $60,000 prize. Jimbo and Kandy then lip-sync to "Do Ya Wanna Funk" by Sylvester and Patrick Cowley. After the lip-sync it is declared that Jimbo is the winner of the season, leaving Kandy Muse as runner-up.: Alternating Judges: Carson Kressley and Ross Mathews; Main Challenge: Lip-sync and perform choreography for an original song; Runway Theme: Finale Fabulosity; Queen of the Fame Games: LaLa Ri; Lip-Sync Song: "Do Ya Wanna Funk" by Sylvester and Patrick Cowley; Runner-up: Kandy Muse; Winner of RuPaul's Drag Race All Stars Season 8: Jimbo
