= Doris Fisher (songwriter) =

American singer and songwriter (1915–2003)

Background information
- Born: May 2, 1915; New York City, New York, U.S.
- Died: January 15, 2003 (aged 87) Los Angeles, California, U.S.
- Genres: Songwriter, singer
- Years active: Late 1930s–1949

Doris Fisher (May 2, 1915 – January 15, 2003) was an American singer and songwriter, collaborating both as lyricist and composer. She co-wrote many popular songs in the 1940s, including "Whispering Grass", "You Always Hurt the One You Love", "Into Each Life Some Rain Must Fall", "That Ole Devil Called Love", and "Put the Blame on Mame." Her songs were recorded by the Ink Spots, Louis Prima, Billie Holiday, Bing Crosby, the Andrews Sisters, Pearl Bailey, the Mills Brothers and Ella Fitzgerald amongst others.

== Early life ==
Fisher was born in New York, the daughter of noted songwriter Fred Fisher. Her brothers Dan Fisher ("Good Morning Heartache") and Marvin Fisher ("When Sunny Gets Blue") also became songwriters.

== Career ==
In the late 1930s, she sang regularly on radio station WOR with Eddy Duchin's band. She also performed with other big bands including Count Basie, and led the vocal group Penny Wise and Her Wise Guys who recorded for the Vocalion label in 1938. Her first hit composition came the same year, co-writing the novelty song "Tutti Frutti" with its performer, Slim Gaillard. Following its success, she began writing songs for Mike Todd's Star and Garter revue on Broadway.

In 1940, she co-wrote with her father the song, "Whispering Grass" for The Ink Spots. Her most successful songwriting period came after she met lyricist Allan Roberts in 1944, in her father's office at the Brill Building. Within a year of starting to work together, they co-wrote "You Always Hurt the One You Love", a no.1 hit that year for the Mills Brothers and in 2017 the Mills Brothers version was inducted into The Grammy Hall of Fame; "Good, Good, Good (That's You, That's You)", recorded by Bing Crosby and the Andrews Sisters; "Into Each Life Some Rain Must Fall", another no. 1 hit for the Ink Spots with Ella Fitzgerald; "That Ole Devil Called Love" recorded by Billie Holiday; "Angelina (The Waitress at the Pizzeria)", a hit for Louis Prima; "Tampico", a hit by Stan Kenton; and "Invitation to the Blues", which she co-wrote with Roberts and Arthur Gershwin, the younger brother of George and Ira Gershwin and which was first recorded by Ella Mae Morse.

In 1945, she and Roberts were signed by Harry Cohn of Columbia Pictures in Hollywood to a seven-year contract to supply songs for films. They had immediate success with the songs "Amado Mio" and "Put the Blame on Mame", written for Gilda starring Rita Hayworth, and in all contributed to about twenty films for the company, including Dead Reckoning and The Lady from Shanghai. Fisher's other hit compositions included "That's Good Enough for Me" and "Tired", recorded by Pearl Bailey; "Let's Stay Young Forever", and "It's So Easy". In a 1947 interview, Fisher said that "Allan is the tear-jerker of the team, and I specialize in light stuff." Fisher's "lighthearted, sentimental" compositions were so popular that at the time she was known as the "Queen of the Juke Box."

== Personal life and death ==
She married real estate developer Charles Gershenson, from Detroit, Michigan in 1947 and left the music business soon afterwards, moving to Detroit, Michigan to raise their two children, Frederika and Ned Gershenson. She became a collector of antique American furniture, and an advisor on interior design. In the early 1960s she advised President John F. Kennedy and his wife Jacqueline on interior design for the White House. Fisher and Gershenson divorced in the 1960s, and she returned to Los Angeles, California, where she set up a retail business, Cookstores, selling kitchen and dining room items.

Fisher died at Century City Hospital in Los Angeles in January 2003, aged 87. Her friend, the pianist and singer Michael Feinstein, praised her tenacity and talent in what at the time was a man's world.
