= I'm Not Perfect (But I'm Perfect for You) =

Single by Grace Jones

from the album Inside Story
- B-side: "Scary But Fun"
- Released: October 1986
- Recorded: 1986
- Studio: Skyline Studios (New York, NY)
- Genre: Pop; dance-pop
- Length: 3:22
- Label: Manhattan
- Songwriters: Grace Jones; Bruce Woolley
- Producers: Grace Jones; Nile Rodgers

Grace Jones singles chronology
"Jones the Rhythm" (1985)	"I'm Not Perfect (But I'm Perfect for You)" (1986)	"Party Girl" (1986)

Music video
- "I'm Not Perfect (But I'm Perfect for You)" on YouTube

"I'm Not Perfect (But I'm Perfect for You)" is a song by Jamaican singer and songwriter Grace Jones, released as the first single from her eighth album, Inside Story (1986). It was co-written by Bruce Woolley and produced by Nile Rodgers of Chic fame. For the 12" single release, "I'm Not Perfect" was remixed by Larry Levan and The Latin Rascals. The track met with commercial success, becoming one of Jones's biggest hits. It made the top 40 in several European countries and top 10 in New Zealand, and was the highest-charting single by Grace Jones on the US Billboard Hot 100, peaking at number 69, and her last song to enter this chart.

== Background and lyrics ==
The song came from an idea that Jones and Mick Jagger had "when you are famous, and having to be as perfect for your partner as you are as a performer"; one of the pair did one line and the other followed. Although they only got as far as the title, Jones told Jagger that she would go away and develop it into a song imagining what her and Jagger would have said.

== Music video ==
The accompanying music video for "I'm Not Perfect (But I'm Perfect for You)" was directed by Jones, and was the only video she directed. The video cost $250,000, and featured Jones wearing a huge black and white skirt hand-painted by artist and the assistant director Keith Haring in Paris. The video follows Jones going through the processes of "self-healing and beautification", including acupuncture, mud and milk baths, waxing, and a "nightmare psychotherapy session", in order to be "perfect". She soon wears the dress made by Haring, which her "admirers and worshipers" enter under and are "devoured" by her. It includes cameo appearances from several of Jones's friends, including Andy Warhol (months before he died), record producer Nile Rodgers and fashion designer Tina Chow.

Haring also appears in the video, captured when painting black patterns on a white 60-foot skirt that Jones wears while standing on a platform.

Jones stated in her 2015 book I'll Never Write My Memoirs that Capitol were "unconvinced" that she was competent enough to direct a music video, and that because the experience was so difficult — "not the directing itself but working with Capitol" — she vowed never to direct another video. She claims that because she was in every shot, she had to have her makeup frequently reapplied in an adjacent room, and upon returning to the studio, "they [Capitol] would be shooting something or having the cast change clothes. I would say 'What's going on? I am the director. I know what I am doing.'" Capitol also cut the production time of the video to two days despite Jones's request for more time.

== Usage in media ==
In June 2023, the song was utilized for the "lip sync for your legacy" segment of the sixth episode of the eighth season of RuPaul's Drag Race All Stars, which also featured a runway dedicated to Jones. The top all star of the week, Kandy Muse, and lip sync assassin Angeria Paris VanMicheals performed the song, with Kandy Muse being declared the victor.

== Track listing ==
- 7" single

A. "I'm Not Perfect (But I'm Perfect for You)" – 3:22
B. "Scary But Fun" – 3:55

- 12" single

A. "I'm Not Perfect (But I'm Perfect for You)" (The Perfectly Extended Remix) – 5:54
B1. "I'm Not Perfect (But I'm Perfect for You)" (instrumental version) – 4:58
B2. "Scary But Fun" – 3:55

- 12" US single

A1. "I'm Not Perfect (But I'm Perfect for You)" (The Perfectly Extended Remix) – 5:54
A2. "I'm Not Perfect (But I'm Perfect for You)" (The Right on Time Edit) – 6:55
B1. "I'm Not Perfect (But I'm Perfect for You)" (The Ultra Perfect Edit) – 7:15
B2. "I'm Not Perfect (But I'm Perfect for You)" (The Ultra Perfect Dub) – 5:23
B3. "Scary But Fun" – 3:55

== Charts ==
Chart performance for "I'm Not Perfect (But I'm Perfect for You)"
Chart (1986)	Peak position
Belgium (Ultratop)	18
European Hot 100 Singles (Music & Media)	24
Finland (Suomen virallinen lista)	11
Ireland (IRMA)	24
Italy (Musica e dischi)	15
Netherlands (Single Top 100)	39
New Zealand (Official New Zealand Music Chart)	9
Spain (Productores de Música de España)	16
Switzerland (Swiss Hitparade)	24
UK Singles (OCC)	56
US Billboard Hot 100	69
US Dance Music/Club Play (Billboard)	4
US Hot Black Singles (Billboard)	9
US Hot Dance Music/Maxi-Singles Sales (Billboard)	12
West Germany (GfK Entertainment Charts)	39
