= Gilda (film) =

1946 American film noir by Charles Vidor

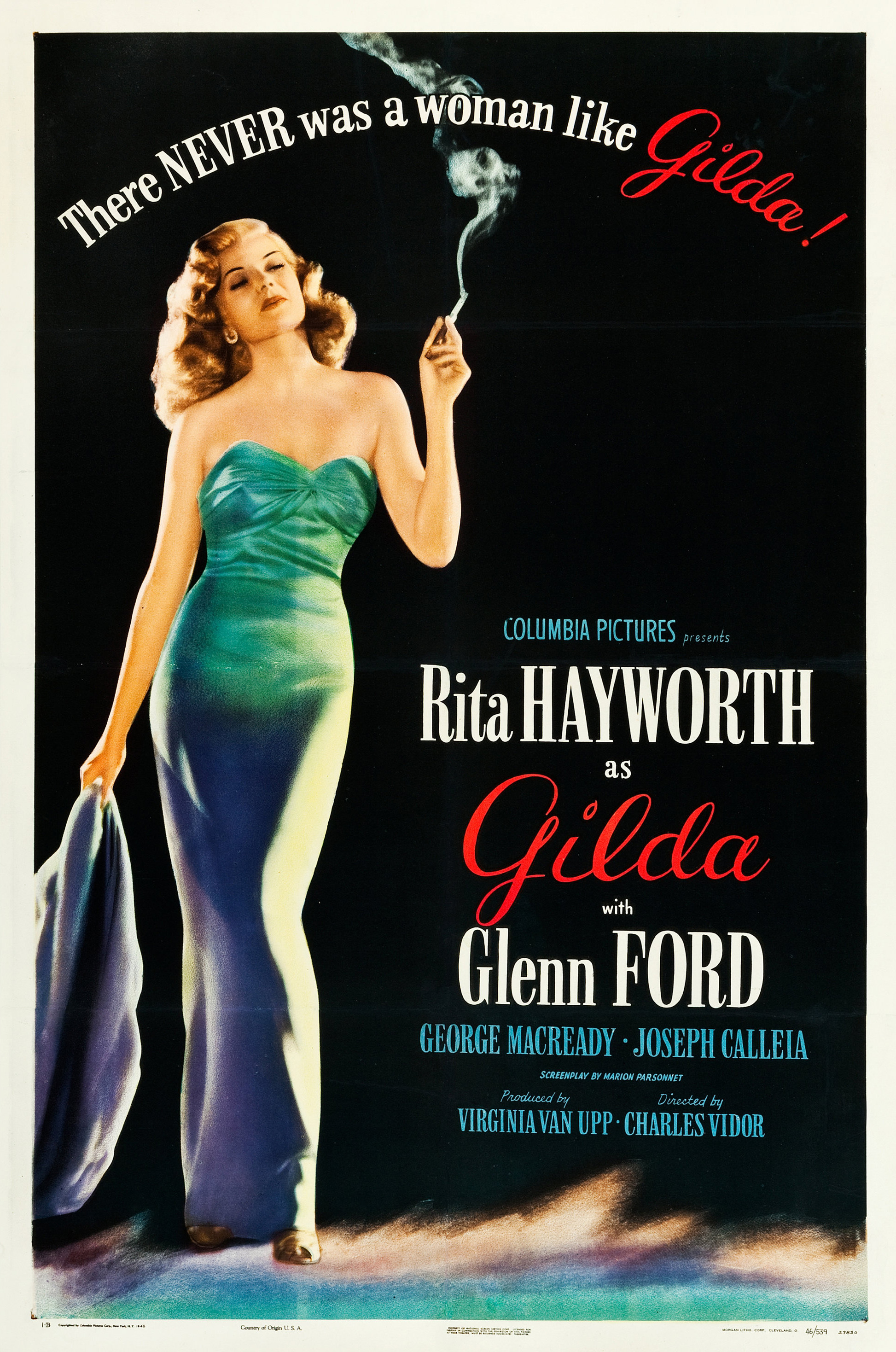
- Theatrical release poster, "Style B"
- Directed by: Charles Vidor
- Screenplay by: Marion Parsonnet; Ben Hecht (uncredited)
- Adaptation by: Jo Eisinger
- Story by: E.A. Ellington
- Produced by: Virginia Van Upp
- Starring: Rita Hayworth; Glenn Ford; George Macready; Joseph Calleia
- Cinematography: Rudolph Maté
- Edited by: Charles Nelson
- Music by: M. W. Stoloff; Marlin Skiles
- Color process: Black and white
- Production company: Columbia Pictures
- Distributed by: Columbia Pictures
- Release dates: March 14, 1946 (New York City); April 25, 1946 (United States)
- Running time: 110 minutes
- Country: United States
- Language: English
- Budget: $2 million
- Box office: $6 million (rentals)

Theatrical trailer

Gilda is a 1946 American musical film noir directed by Charles Vidor and starring Rita Hayworth and Glenn Ford.

The film is known for cinematographer Rudolph Maté's lush photography, glamorous setting, costume designer Jean Louis's wardrobe for Hayworth (particularly for the dance numbers), and choreographer Jack Cole's staging of "Put the Blame on Mame" and "Amado Mio", sung by Anita Ellis. Over the years Gilda has gained cult classic status. In 2013, the film was selected for preservation in the United States National Film Registry by the Library of Congress as being "culturally, historically or aesthetically significant".

== Plot ==
Johnny Farrell, an American newly arrived in Buenos Aires, Argentina, wins money from sailors at the city's docks by playing craps with weighted dice. He is rescued from a robbery attempt by a stranger, Ballin Mundson. Mundson tells Farrell about an illegal high-class casino in the city, but warns him not to cheat there. After winning at blackjack by card counting, he is taken to see the casino's owner, who turns out to be Mundson. Farrell talks Mundson into hiring him and soon becomes his trusted casino manager.

Mundson returns from a trip to the United States and announces he has an extremely beautiful new wife, Gilda, whom he has married after only knowing her for a day. Farrell and Gilda instantly recognise each other from the past, though both deny it when Mundson questions them. Mundson assigns Farrell to watch over Gilda. She cavorts with men at all hours in increasingly more blatant efforts to enrage Farrell, and in return he grows ever more spiteful towards her.

Mundson is visited by two German mobsters. Their organisation had financed a tungsten cartel, with everything in Mundson's name in order to hide their connection to it. They have decided that it is safe to take the cartel back since World War II has ended, but Mundson refuses to transfer ownership. Suspicious of the Germans, the Argentinian police assign agent Obregón to try to obtain information from Farrell, but he knows nothing about this aspect of Mundson's operations.

The Germans return to the casino during a Carnival celebration, and Mundson stabs and kills one of them. Farrell rushes to take Gilda to safety. Alone in Mundson's house, they have another confrontation and, after declaring their undying hatred for each other, passionately kiss. After hearing the front door slam, they realize that Mundson has overheard them, and a guilt-ridden Farrell pursues him to a waiting private airplane. The plane plummets into the ocean and explodes. Mundson parachutes to safety, but Farrell, unaware of this, concludes that he is dead.

Gilda inherits Mundson's estate, and she and Farrell immediately marry. He cannot set aside his resentment and suspicion of her, however. Leaving her to live alone, he also has her followed day and night by his men to keep her from seeing anyone else. Gilda tries to escape the tortured marriage a number of times, but Farrell thwarts every attempt.

Obregón confiscates the casino from Farrell and informs him that Gilda was never truly unfaithful to Mundson or to him, prompting Farrell to try to reconcile with her as she prepares to return to the United States. At that moment, Mundson reappears, revealing his faked suicide. He tries to kill both Gilda and Farrell but casino worker Uncle Pío fatally stabs him in the back. When Obregón arrives, Johnny tries to take the blame for the murder, but Obregón points out that Mundson was already declared legally dead. Farrell gives Obregón incriminating documents from Mundson's safe. He and Gilda finally reconcile, agreeing to go home together.

== Cast ==
Steven Geray, Glenn Ford and Rita Hayworth in Gilda

- Rita Hayworth as Gilda Mundson
- Glenn Ford as Johnny Farrell
- George Macready as Ballin Mundson
- Joseph Calleia as Detective Mauricio Miguel Obregón
- Steven Geray as Uncle Pío
- Joe Sawyer as Casey
- Gerald Mohr as Captain Delgado
- Mark Roberts as Gabe Evans
- Ludwig Donath as German
- Don Douglas as Thomas Langford
- Lionel Royce as German
- George J. Lewis as Huerta

Cast notes

- Anita Ellis dubbed the singing voice of Rita Hayworth. (Note: There were claims made that Hayworth had sung the acoustic guitar version of "Put the Blame on Mame", but this was untrue. Ellis dubbed all of the vocal parts since both their voices could not be used, Ellis's singing voice was too unlike Hayworth's for Hayworth's voice to be used in different parts of the film.)

== Production ==
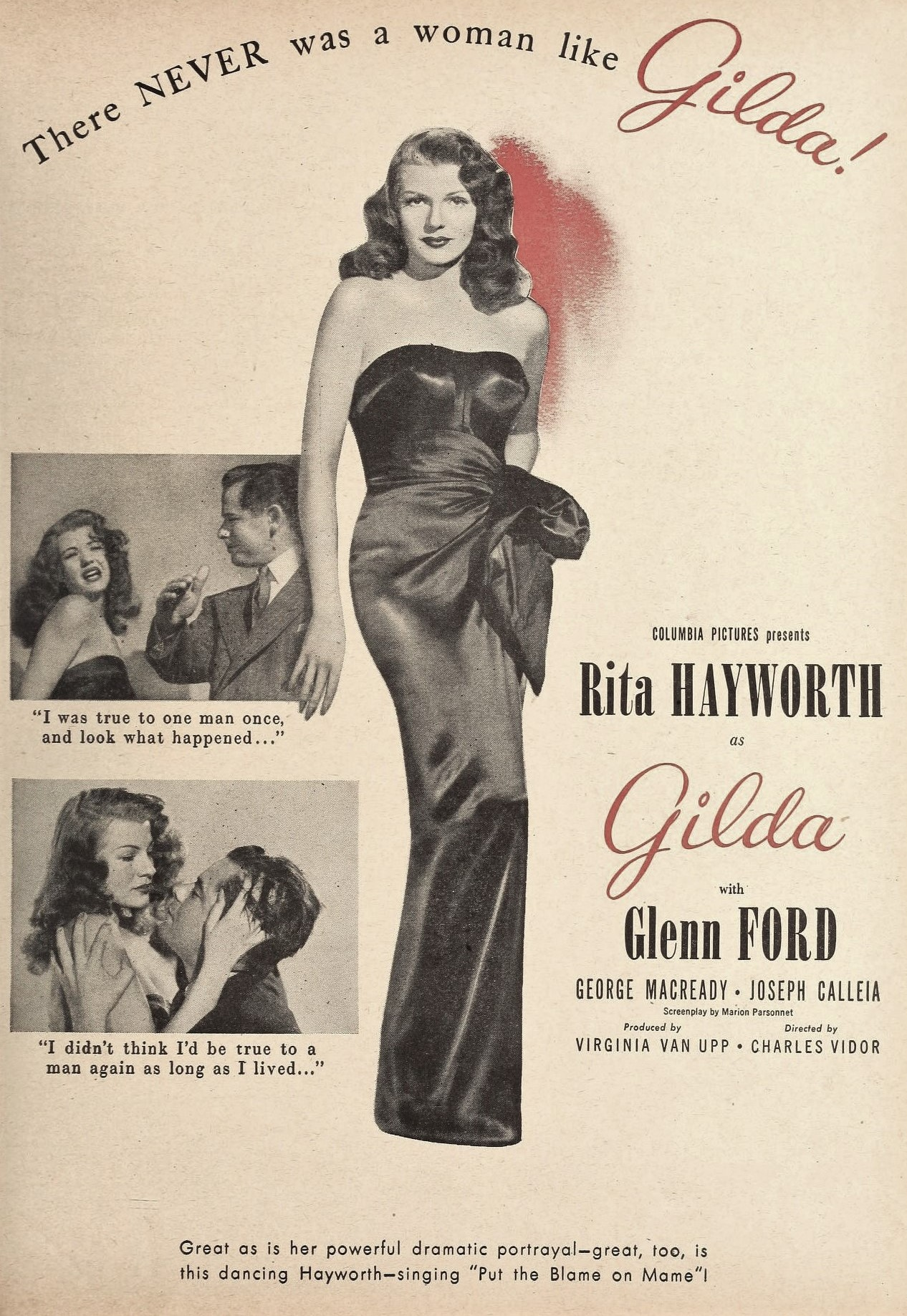
Costume designer Jean Louis called the black strapless gown worn by Rita Hayworth in Gilda "the most famous dress I ever made."

Gilda was developed by producer Virginia Van Upp as a vehicle for Hayworth, who had mostly been known for her roles in musical comedies at that time. The story was originally set to be an American gangster film directed by Edmund Goulding. However, the location of the story was changed to Buenos Aires after objections from censor Joseph Breen and the replacement of Goulding with Charles Vidor. Gilda was filmed from September 4 to December 10, 1945. During filming, Hayworth and Ford began an affair that would last until Hayworth was diagnosed with Alzheimer's disease by the early 1980s.

== Reception ==
When first released, the film earned mixed to positive reviews. Variety liked the film and wrote, "Hayworth is photographed most beguilingly. The producers have created nothing subtle in the projection of her s.a. [sex appeal], and that's probably been wise. Glenn Ford is the vis-a-vis, in his first picture part in several years ... Gilda is obviously an expensive production—and shows it. The direction is static, but that's more the fault of the writers." Reviewing the film for The New York Times, Bosley Crowther gave the film a negative review, admitting he did not like or understand the movie, but praised Ford as having "a certain stamina and poise in the role of a tough young gambler."

Gilda was screened in competition at the 1946 Cannes Film Festival, the first time the festival was held. In its release, the film earned theatrical rentals of $3,750,000 in the United States and Canada, and $6 million worldwide.

In retrospect, the film has become critically acclaimed. Review aggregator Rotten Tomatoes currently reported that 90% of 73 critics gave the film a positive review, with an average rating of 8.1/10. The site's critics consensus reads: "Rita Hayworth carries Gilda on the sheer strength of her screen presence, rendering the film's somewhat middling story almost irrelevant." More recently, film critic Emanuel Levy wrote a positive review: "Featuring Rita Hayworth in her best-known performance, Gilda, released just after the end of WWII, draws much of its peculiar power from its mixture of genres and the way its characters interact with each other ... Gilda was a cross between a hardcore noir adventure of the 1940s and the cycle of 'women's pictures.' Imbued with a modern perspective, the film is quite remarkable in the way it deals with sexual issues." Mike D'Angelo of The A.V. Club said that "part of Gilda's fascination is the way that it complicates the idea of the femme fatale. (...) Hayworth plays Gilda with a layer of bravado that masks deep insecurity"; however, he felt that the film's unusually happy ending for a noir compromised it.

=== Operation Crossroads nuclear test ===
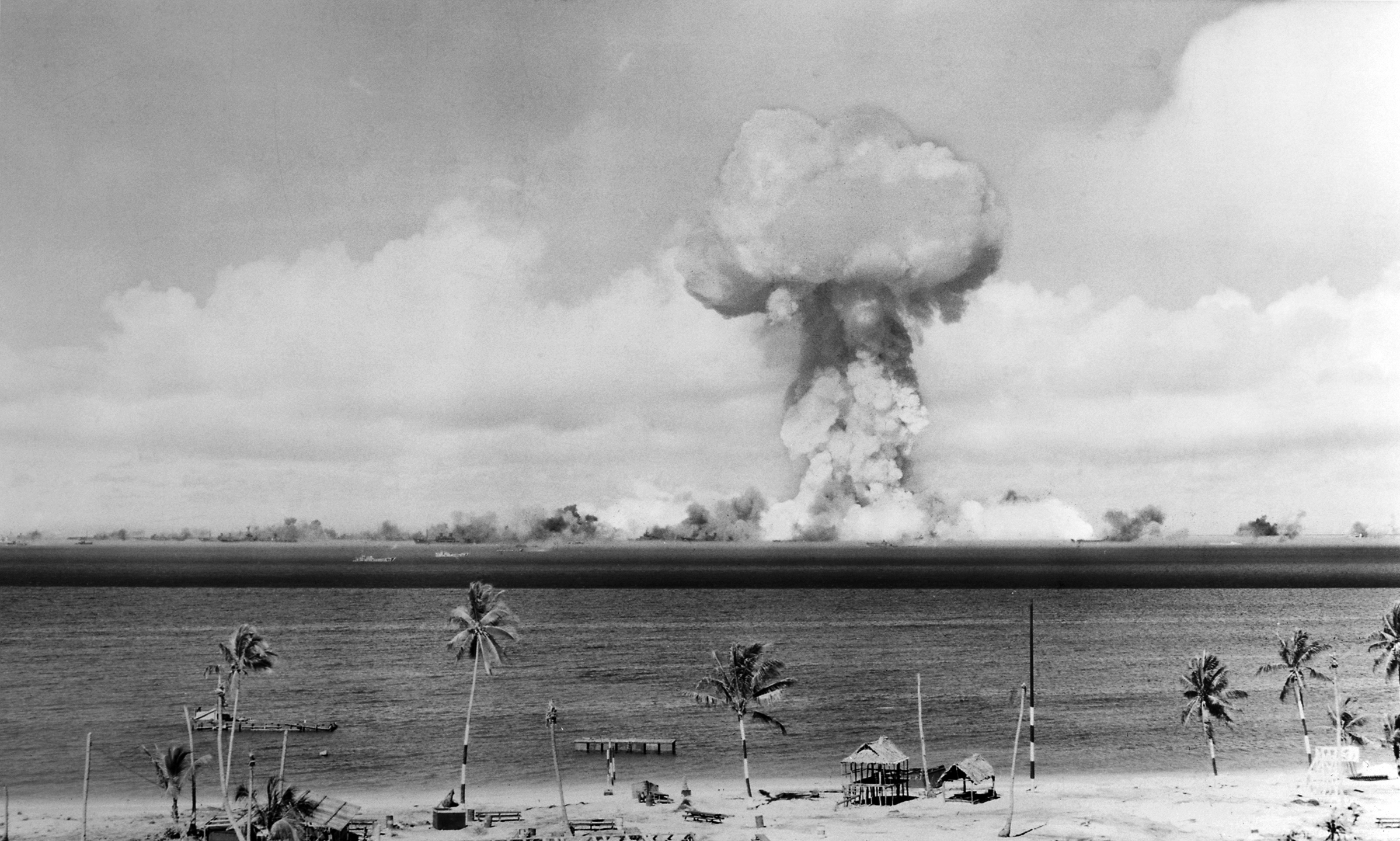
Gilda, the 23-kiloton air-deployed nuclear weapon detonated on July 1, 1946, during Operation Crossroads.

Attesting to its immediate success, it was widely reported that an atomic bomb to be tested at Bikini Atoll in the Marshall Islands would bear the film's title above an image of Hayworth, a reference to her bombshell status. The bomb was decorated with a photograph of Hayworth cut from the June 1946 issue of Esquire magazine; above it was stenciled the device's nickname, "Gilda", in two-inch black letters.

Although the gesture was meant as a compliment, Hayworth was deeply offended. According to Orson Welles, her husband at the time of filming Gilda, Hayworth believed it to be a publicity stunt from Columbia executive Harry Cohn and was furious. Welles told biographer Barbara Leaming: "Rita used to fly into terrible rages all the time, but the angriest was when she found out that they'd put her on the atom bomb. Rita almost went insane, she was so angry. ... She wanted to go to Washington to hold a press conference, but Harry Cohn wouldn't let her because it would be unpatriotic." Welles tried to persuade Hayworth that the whole business was not a publicity stunt on Cohn's part, that it was simply homage to her from the flight crew.

=== Memorabilia ===
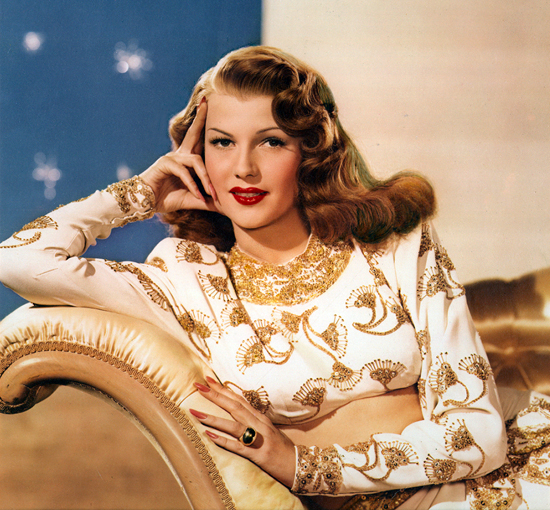
Hayworth in the costume for the "Amado Mio" nightclub sequence

The two-piece costume worn by Hayworth in the "Amado Mio" nightclub sequence was offered as part of the "TCM Presents ... There's No Place Like Hollywood" auction November 24, 2014, at Bonhams in New York. It was estimated that the costume would fetch between $40,000 and $60,000; at the event, it sold for $161,000 (equivalent to $219,000 in 2025).

== Home media ==
On November 7, 2000 (same day as the 2000 United States presidential election that saw George W. Bush elected as the President of the United States), Columbia TriStar Home Video (via the Columbia Classics label) released Gilda on DVD in Region 1 for the first time, with restoration by the UCLA Film and Television Archive.

In January 2016 The Criterion Collection released DVD and Blu-ray Disc versions of Gilda, featuring a new high-definition digital film restoration created on a Spirit 2K DataCine scanner, with uncompressed monaural soundtrack on the Blu-ray version. On April 7, 2026, Criterion released the 4K Ultra HD and a newly remastered Blu-ray combo for the first time to commemorate the film's 80th anniversary; this Dolby Vision/HDR master and the remastered combo release is sourced from a brand new 4K digital transfer rather than the HD digital transfer seen in the 2016 Blu-ray release.

== Legacy ==
Hayworth later came to resent the film and its effect on her image. Hayworth once said with some bitterness, "Men go to bed with Gilda, but wake up with me." This quote was referenced by Anna Scott, the fictional actress played by Julia Roberts in the film Notting Hill.

Hayworth's performance as Gilda lent itself to the Stephen King novella Rita Hayworth and Shawshank Redemption in the form of a poster hanging on the wall of prisoner Andy Dufresne, who used it to cover the hole in the wall he used to escape. In the novella's film adaption, the film is shown to the prisoners for movie night. The film has also been watched by characters in Hero, Girl, Interrupted, and The Thirteenth Floor, as well as episodes of Joan of Arcadia, The Blacklist, and The Penguin.

Rita Hayworth’s performance in Gilda was a primary inspiration for the iconic animated character Jessica Rabbit in Who Framed Roger Rabbit (1988). Specifically, Hayworth's appearance, the song "Put the Blame on Mame," and her hourglass figure influenced Jessica’s design, hair, and stage presence.

In the 2001 film Mulholland Drive, the amnesiac protagonist played by Laura Harring proclaims her name as 'Rita' after seeing a Gilda poster on the wall.

An excerpt of the film where Hayworth sings "Put the Blame on Mame" was planned to be used in Michael Jackson's 2009 This Is It concert residency at the O2 Arena in London as part of the Smooth Criminal visuals, in addition to a chase scene. Jackson was digitally inserted into the film using green screen and computer effects.

The film has been shown on the cable television channel Turner Classic Movies (TCM) at the request of guest hosts several times, including in January 2024 when Columbia Pictures celebrated its 100th anniversary. In 2015, actress Diahann Carroll chose the film and expressed admiration for Hayworth and her performance in the film. Guest hosts Joan Collins and Debra Winger have also chosen and discussed the film.
