= Stand as One – Live at Glastonbury 2016 =

Stand As One – Live at Glastonbury 2016

Compilation album by Various Artists
- Released: 29 July 2016 (digital download), 19 August 2016 (CD)
- Recorded: 22–26 June 2016
- Length: 73:58
- Label: Parlophone; PLG UK Frontline

Stand As One – Live at Glastonbury 2016 is a 2016 compilation album of live music performances at Glastonbury Festival 2016, released on 29 July 2016 as a digital download. A physical release followed on 12 August. Details of the album were announced by the international humanitarian charity Oxfam on 20 June, and following the death of British Labour Party Member of Parliament Jo Cox a few days earlier. Cox had worked for Oxfam for a number of years before entering politics, and Oxfam announced that the album would be released in her memory, with proceeds going to help their work with refugees. Artists and groups scheduled to appear on the compilation include Muse, Coldplay, Jeff Lynne's ELO, Laura Mvula, Jack Garratt, The 1975, Editors, Years & Years, Fatboy Slim, Wolf Alice and Chvrches.

== Track listing ==
Note: Asterisked tracks (*) are only on the digital release of the album

1. Coldplay – "Birds"
2. Foals – "What Went Down"
3. The Last Shadow Puppets – "The Dream Synopsis"
4. Jeff Lynne’s ELO – "Showdown"
5. Chvrches – "Bury It"
6. New Order – "Bizarre Love Triangle"
7. Years & Years – "Eyes Shut"
8. Jess Glynne – "Right Here"
9. Muse – "Starlight"
10. Wolf Alice – "Giant Peach"
11. Editors – "Munich" *
12. Sigur Rós – "Sæglópur"
13. John Grant – "Grey Tickles, Black Pressure"
14. Richard Hawley – "Tonight the Streets Are Ours"
15. Jack Garratt – "Worry" *
16. Laura Mvula – "People"
17. Madness – "My Girl"
18. Baaba Maal – "Fulani Rock"
19. Jamie Lawson – "Someone for Everyone" *
