= Best Of (The Czars album) =

Compilation album by The Czars
- Released: December 9, 2014
- Genre: Rock
- Length: 89:29
- Label: Bella Union

The Czars chronology
Sorry I Made You Cry (2006)	Best Of (2014)

Professional ratings
Aggregate scores
Source	Rating
Metacritic	79/100
Review scores
Source	Rating
MusicOMH	3/5 stars

Best Of is a compilation album by American band The Czars. It was released in December 2014 under Bella Union.

== Track listing ==
Disc one
No.	Title	Original release	Length
1.	"Val"	Before... But Longer (2000)	5:07
2.	"Concentrate"	Before... But Longer (2000)	4:44
3.	"Get Used to It"	Before... But Longer (2000)	3:41
4.	"Dave's Dream"	Before... But Longer (2000)	3:49
5.	"Roger's Song"	The Ugly People vs the Beautiful People (2001)	5:14
6.	"Drug"	The Ugly People vs the Beautiful People (2001)	4:09
7.	"Side Effects"	The Ugly People vs the Beautiful People (2001)	4:57
8.	"Anger"	The Ugly People vs the Beautiful People (2001)	4:07
9.	"Killjoy"	The Ugly People vs the Beautiful People (2001)	5:26
10.	"Lullaby 6000"	The Ugly People vs the Beautiful People (2001)	5:32

Disc two
No.	Title	Original release	Length
1.	"Paint the Moon"	Goodbye (2004)	4:12
2.	"Goodbye"	Goodbye (2004)	4:25
3.	"My Love"	Goodbye (2004)	6:02
4.	"Los"	Goodbye (2004)	5:42
5.	"Little Pink House"	Goodbye (2004)	5:14
6.	"Song to the Siren"	Sing a Song for You: Tribute to Tim Buckley (2000)	7:51
7.	"Angel Eyes"	"Paint the Moon" single B-side (2004)	4:46
8.	"Where the Boys Are"	"Paint the Moon" single B-side (2004)	4:31
