= Pale Green Ghosts =

Studio album by John Grant
- Released: March 11, 2013
- Genre: Synth-pop, soft rock
- Length: 60:40
- Label: Bella Union
- Producer: Birgir Þórarinsson, John Grant

John Grant chronology
Queen of Denmark (2010)	Pale Green Ghosts (2013)	Grey Tickles, Black Pressure (2015)

Professional ratings
Aggregate scores
Source	Rating
AnyDecentMusic?	8.3/10
Metacritic	83/100
Review scores
Source	Rating
AllMusic	3/5 stars
The Daily Telegraph	5/5 stars
The Guardian	5/5 stars
The Independent	5/5 stars
Mojo	3/5 stars
NME	8/10
Pitchfork	7.0/10
Q	4/5 stars
Record Collector	4/5 stars
Uncut	8/10

Pale Green Ghosts is the second solo album by former Czars frontman John Grant, released on March 11, 2013, on the Bella Union label. Recorded in Reykjavík and produced by Icelandic musician Birgir Þórarinsson, the album features a range of local musicians alongside Irish singer Sinéad O'Connor providing backing vocals.

The title refers to the Russian olive trees that stand along the I-25 highway near Grant's childhood home in Parker, Colorado. The track "Pale Green Ghosts" includes a string arrangement inspired by the second movement of Prelude in C-sharp minor by Rachmaninoff. Pale Green Ghosts was chosen as Album of the Year 2013 by Rough Trade.

== Track listing ==
All tracks are written by John Grant.

Pale Green Ghosts track listing
No.	Title	Length
1.	"Pale Green Ghosts"	6:04
2.	"Black Belt"	4:18
3.	"GMF"	5:13
4.	"Vietnam"	5:29
5.	"It Doesn't Matter to Him" (featuring Sinéad O'Connor)	6:27
6.	"Why Don't You Love Me Anymore" (featuring Sinéad O'Connor)	6:10
7.	"You Don't Have To"	5:51
8.	"Sensitive New Age Guy"	4:40
9.	"Ernest Borgnine"	4:53
10.	"I Hate This Town"	4:01
11.	"Glacier" (featuring Sinéad O'Connor)	7:34

Disc 2
No.	Title	Length
1.	"Black Belt" (Hercules and Love Affair Remix)	7:48
2.	"Black Belt" (Gluteus Maximus Vocal Remix)	8:24
3.	"Pale Green Ghosts" (Nivolt Remix)	5:20
4.	"Pale Green Ghosts" (No Ceremony /// Remix)	4:48
5.	"Why Don't You Love Me" (Nivolt Remix)	5:48
6.	"Why Don't You Love Me" (Bon Homme Remix)	7:39

== Personnel ==
- John Grant – lead vocals, synth programming
- Chris Pemberton – piano
- Sinéad O'Connor – backing vocals
- Arnar Geir Ómarsson – drums
- McKenzie Smith – drums
- Jakob Smári Magnússon – bass (tracks 3 and 10)
- Paul Alexander – bass
- Pétur Hallgrímsson – guitar
- Óskar Gudjónsson – saxophone
- Birgir Þórarinsson (a.k.a. Biggi Veira) – synth programming

== Charts ==
=== Weekly charts ===
Weekly chart performance for Pale Green Ghosts
Chart (2013)	Peak
Belgian Albums (Ultratop Flanders)	42
Belgian Albums (Ultratop Wallonia)	122
Dutch Albums (Album Top 100)	68
Irish Albums (IRMA)	16
Scottish Albums (OCC)	20
Swedish Albums (Sverigetopplistan)	42
UK Albums (OCC)	16
UK Independent Albums (OCC)	2
US Heatseekers Albums (Billboard)	28

=== Year-end charts ===
2013 year-end chart performance for Pale Green Ghosts
Chart (2013)	Rank
Icelandic Albums (Tónlist)	1
