= John Grant (musician) =

American singer (born 1968)

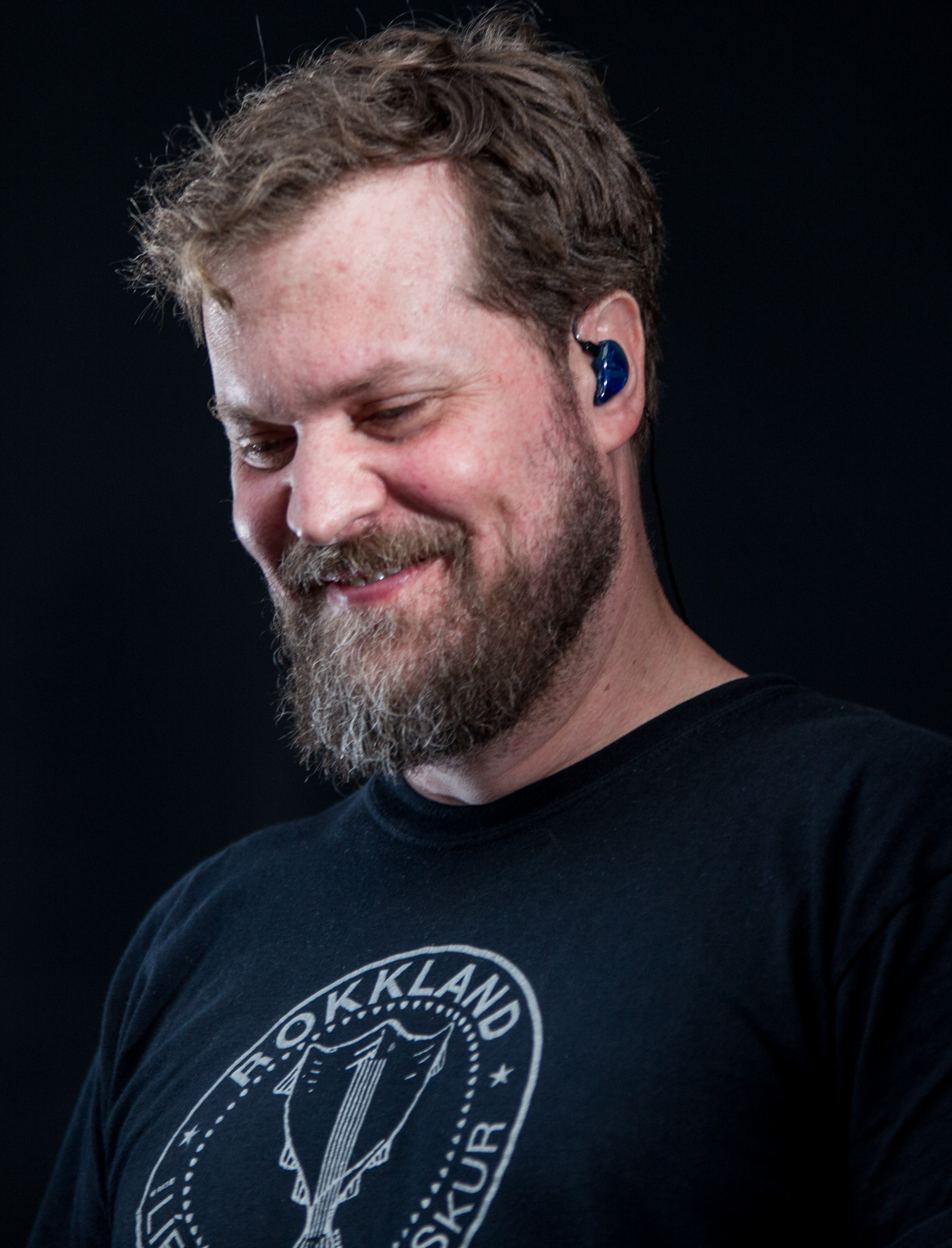
- Grant in July 2014

Background information
- Born: July 25, 1968 (age 58); Buchanan, Michigan, U.S.
- Genres: Alternative rock; indie rock; electronic rock; synth-pop; new wave; soft rock
- Occupations: Singer; musician; songwriter
- Instruments: Vocals; piano; synthesizer
- Years active: 1994–2006; 2010–present
- Labels: Bella Union; Partisan; Sena
- Member of: Creep Show
- Formerly of: The Czars
- Website: johngrantmusic.com

John William Grant (born July 25, 1968) is an American singer, musician, and songwriter who holds both American and Icelandic citizenship. He first became known as the co-founder, lead singer, pianist, and primary songwriter for the alternative rock band the Czars. After releasing six albums from 1994 to 2006, the band split up and Grant retired for four years before starting a solo career.

Grant's debut solo album Queen of Denmark (2010) was named the best album of the year by Mojo. His second album Pale Green Ghosts (2013) was named the best album of the year by Rough Trade. His third album Grey Tickles, Black Pressure (2015) received widespread critical acclaim and peaked at No. 5 on the UK albums chart, while his fourth album Love Is Magic (2018) entered the top 20 in the UK. His fifth and sixth albums Boy from Michigan (2021) and The Art of the Lie (2024) also received acclaim. His other work includes the live album John Grant and the BBC Philharmonic Orchestra: Live in Concert (2014), on which he performed songs from his first two albums while accompanied by the BBC Philharmonic Orchestra.

Grant is also known for his collaborations with varied musicians such as Budgie, CMAT, Elbow, Elton John, Goldfrapp, GusGus, Hercules and Love Affair, Kylie Minogue, Midlake, Robbie Williams, Sinéad O'Connor, Tracey Thorn, Linda Thompson, Big Special and Bi-2. Since 2018, he has been the lead vocalist of Creep Show, a side project he formed with the members of rock band Wrangler.

== Early life ==
John William Grant was born in Buchanan, Michigan, on July 25, 1968, the son of a housewife mother (died 1995) and an engineer father. He has three siblings and grew up in a conservative Methodist household which was at odds with his realization that he was gay. When he was 12 years old, the family moved to Parker, Colorado. He was bullied both physically and emotionally in high school, and would later write snarky deadpan lyrics about these experiences.

Grant did not feel comfortable with his sexuality until his mid-20s, having been raised in an environment where he was taught that "those people were going to Hell". He moved to Germany in 1988 to continue his study of languages, and began listening to artists such as Siouxsie and the Banshees, Ministry, Scritti Politti, Skinny Puppy, and the Cocteau Twins. Although he was pained for a long time by the fact that his mother called him a "disappointment" on her deathbed and then died soon after, he later came to terms with the experience and said it reminded him of something he would see in his favorite British dark comedy shows.

== Career ==
=== The Czars (1994–2006) ===
In 1994, Grant returned to the U.S. and co-founded the Denver-based alternative rock band The Czars. With Grant as its lead singer, pianist, keyboardist, and primary songwriter, the band enjoyed critical success and released six studio albums, but commercial recognition proved elusive. Grant met with English musician Simon Raymonde, a member of one of Grant's favorite bands, the Cocteau Twins; Raymonde had recently started the record label Bella Union and, although he was not particularly looking for new acts at that time, he saw potential in The Czars and agreed to produce two of their albums. After releasing Sorry I Made You Cry in 2004, the band split in 2006. Grant then took a four-year hiatus, which he spent working in New York City as a waiter at the Gramercy Tavern, a medical interpreter for Russian patients in a hospital, a record store clerk, and a flight attendant. The Czars' Best Of album was released in December 2014.

=== Solo career (2010–present) ===
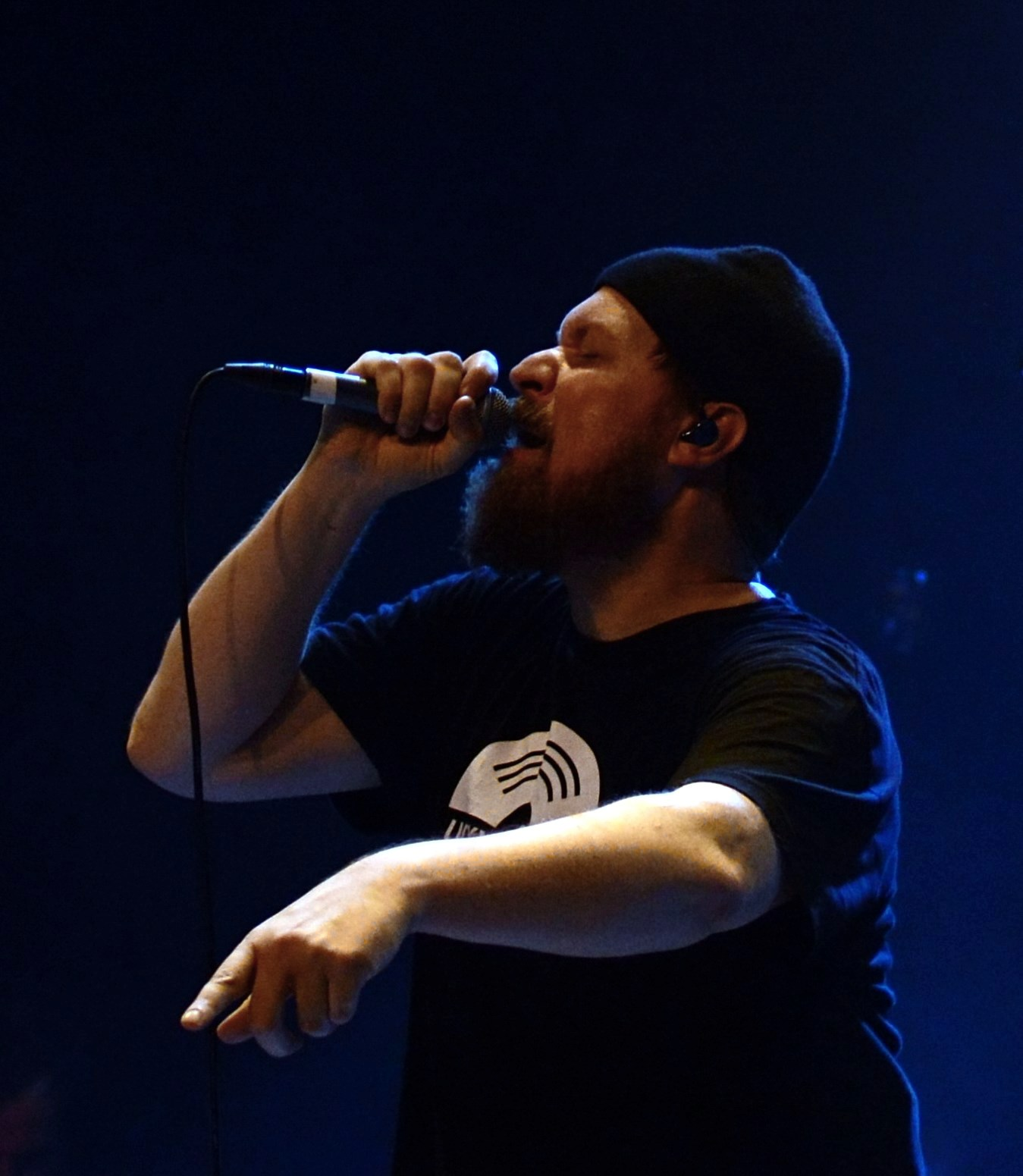
Grant in September 2013

During his hiatus in New York City, Grant had a chance encounter with members of the Texas-based folk rock group Midlake, who eventually persuaded him to return to music. They joined him to record and produce Queen of Denmark, his first solo album, which was released on the Bella Union label in April 2010. Described as a "deeply personal album", it explores Grant's struggles with alcohol and drug addiction as well as his personal struggle to reconcile his homosexuality. He described the members of Midlake as his "brothers" in an interview. Queen of Denmark received critical acclaim and was chosen as the best album of 2010 by British music magazine Mojo, which also awarded Grant its Best Live Act Award and nominated him for its Best Breakthrough Act Award. Filmmaker Andrew Haigh used several songs from Queen of Denmark in his 2011 film Weekend.

During a trip to Iceland to perform at the Airwaves Festival, Grant met Birgir Þórarinsson (aka Biggi Veira) of Icelandic electronic pop group GusGus. The electronic and synthesized dance sounds that he was looking for and experimented with in Veira's studio formed much of the backdrop to his second album, Pale Green Ghosts, which Veira produced. Irish singer Sinéad O'Connor was a guest vocalist on three tracks from the album. Having been quickly and deeply touched by the Icelandic people and landscape, Grant permanently settled in Reykjavík in 2013 and received Icelandic citizenship in 2022.

Pale Green Ghosts was released in March 2013 to critical acclaim. It was Rough Trade Records' Album of the Year, and ranked at No. 2 on The Guardian's list of Best Albums of 2013. A nomination for Best Solo Artist at the Q Awards followed, with David Bowie and Laura Marling among the other nominees. He also received a nomination for Best International Male Solo Artist at the Brit Awards in 2014, Later that year, Grant put his linguistic skills to effect by translating Ásgeir Trausti's album Dýrð í dauðaþögn. The English version, In the Silence, was released in October.

In 2014, Grant co-wrote "No Prejudice", the Icelandic entry for that year's Eurovision Song Contest performed by Pollapönk. He also guested on the 40th anniversary release of Elton John's Goodbye Yellow Brick Road, covering the song "Sweet Painted Lady". He also guested on the album The Feast of The Broken Heart by Hercules & Love Affair, and was also named Man of the Year for 2014 by Attitude magazine. Also in 2014, he joined English band Elbow on the North American leg of their tour.

In October 2014, accompanied by the BBC Philharmonic Orchestra, Grant performed tracks from his first two albums for a concert on BBC Radio 6 Music arranged by Fiona Brice. This was released as an album called John Grant and the BBC Philharmonic Orchestra: Live in Concert. Grant concluded 2014 with rave reviews following his UK concert hall tour with the Royal Northern Sinfonia. Clash magazine wrote that the concert "could honestly be one of the greatest gigs of all time at London's Royal Festival Hall". That night, he duetted with English singer Alison Goldfrapp on the Nancy Sinatra and Lee Hazlewood song "Some Velvet Morning" at the Royal Albert Hall.

In 2015, Grant released his third solo album Grey Tickles, Black Pressure. Recorded in Dallas and produced by John Congleton, it featured guest vocalists Tracey Thorn and Amanda Palmer and drummer Budgie. The album was acclaimed by NME, The Guardian, and Mojo. Before embarking on a worldwide tour, Grant appeared on British talk show Later... with Jools Holland in early October. Accompanied on stage by a band including several backing singers and guest drummer Budgie, he delivered a show at the Hammersmith Apollo in London, receiving a five-star review in the national press. In July, he played at the Glastonbury and Latitude festivals before embarking on a world tour. The following year, he toured across much of the U.S. and Europe. In October of that year, he made a third appearance on the BBC Two show Later... with Jools Holland.

Grant co-wrote and recorded the track "I Don't Want To Hurt You" with Robbie Williams, featured on Williams' 2016 album The Heavy Entertainment Show. In 2016, he performed a solo show at the Royal Albert Hall, which was met with rave reviews. He was joined on stage by Richard Hawley who performed "Disappointing" from Grey Tickles, Black Pressure. Also guesting were Cate Le Bon, who duetted on "Torn Between Two Lovers" (a song made famous by Mary MacGregor) and Kylie Minogue in a performance of "Glacier". Minogue invited Grant back to the Royal Albert Hall to duet with her on "Confide In Me" for A Kylie Christmas in December that year. Two songs from 2013, "Black Belt" and "Pale Green Ghosts", appeared on the HBO series Looking. On December 3, Grant was the subject of BBC Radio 4's Reimagining the City, where he took listeners around his new home city of Reykjavík.

In 2017, Grant appeared at the Hay Literary Festival in conversation with Cosey Fanni Tutti to discuss her autobiography Art Sex Music, which had been named Book of the Year by Sunday Times, Telegraph, and Rough Trade Records. Grant announced in 2017 that he had signed with publishers Little, Brown and Company to write his own autobiography. 2017 also saw him curate North Atlantic Flux: Sounds From Smoky Bay, a four-day event celebrating the best of Nordic culture as part of Hull's year as the UK City of Culture. The festival won three awards at the Drum UK Event Awards, including the prestigious Cultural Event of the Year. Highlights of the festival included performances from Susanne Sundfør, GusGus, Tonik Ensemble, Nils Bech, Adelle Stripe, Wrangler, and Grant, who also gave a two-hour Q&A session.

In July 2017, Grant returned to the Royal Albert Hall to contribute to a fundraising event on behalf of Stonewall, for a conversation with Elizabeth Fraser of the Cocteau Twins; the evening marked the 50th anniversary of the Sexual Offences Act 1967. That month, Grant celebrated the music of Scott Walker as part of an event hosted by the BBC's Late Night Proms. The event was broadcast on BBC Four, BBC Radio 3, and BBC Radio 6 Music. Grant also recorded "Mountaineers", a duet with Susanne Sundfør for her album Music for People in Trouble, which was released in August 2017. Grant teamed up with Elbow frontman Guy Garvey, having previously toured the U.S. with the band in 2014, to record a duet version of Elbow's "Kindling (Fickle Flame)" in September 2017. Grant was a guest vocalist on The Great Distraction, an album by electro-rock band Vessels. The single "Erase the Tapes" featuring Grant was released in September 2017.

In 2018, Grant formed a side project called Creep Show, described as an "experimental pop" and "surreal funk" collaboration with Wrangler members Stephen Mallinder, Phil Winter, and Benge. They have released two albums: Mr. Dynamite (2018) and Yawning Abyss (2023). On July 10, 2018, Grant announced his fourth album Love Is Magic and released the title track. The album was released in October to favorable reviews. In a 5/5 star review, The Independent described the record as "sardonic wit and heart-stopping drops of sheer honesty", and NME hailed it as an album of "arch brilliance that also makes room for quiet introspection". Grant then went on tour in the UK with a full band including Budgie on drums, before embarking on a world tour from November.

In January 2021, Grant released the anti-Trump song "The Only Baby" with an accompanying music video. In March, he released the single "Boy From Michigan" and announced that his upcoming album would share the single's name. In May, the single "Billy" was released, the second from the new album. The album was released on June 25 and received acclaim.

In 2022, Grant recorded a cover of the folk song "God's Gonna Cut You Down" to be used as the opening theme for the BBC One thriller series Inside Man.

In October 2024, Grant released the single "Stay Down, Lazarus" with Big Special, a punk duo from the Black Country, ahead of their UK and European tour together.

Grant collaborated with choreographer-director Jonathan Watkins on a ballet adaptation of Christopher Isherwood's A Single Man, which premiered at Aviva Studios in Manchester in July 2025, with Grant performing on stage as a representation of the protagonist's "mind", opposite former Royal Ballet principal dancer Ed Watson playing the protagonist's "body".

== Personal life ==
Grant moved to Iceland and settled in Reykjavík in 2013, subsequently receiving Icelandic citizenship in 2022. He has explored his homosexuality in his lyrics, and was previously in a relationship with an Icelandic graphic designer whose identity was not disclosed. He is a noted polyglot; in addition to his native English, he is fluent in German, Icelandic, Russian, and Spanish, and can hold basic conversations in French and Swedish.

Grant's years with the Czars were troubling as he battled a drug and alcohol addiction, as well as severe anxiety, having suffered with the latter throughout his adult life. He lived in New York City during his hiatus from music between 2006 and 2010, working as a waiter at the Gramercy Tavern, a medical interpreter for Russian patients in a hospital, a record store clerk, and a flight attendant. He felt compelled to continue writing music during this time, and began the process of confronting the addictions that had been so destructive during his time with the Czars.

While on tour in 2011, Grant lost his passport and was not allowed to board a flight from London to Verona; after remembering that the day's edition of The Times newspaper featured his image and details of an interview on the front page, he used a copy of the newspaper as a form of ID and obtained an emergency passport from London's American embassy, which allowed him to board a later flight.

In 2012, while performing with Hercules and Love Affair at the Meltdown Festival in London, Grant revealed that he had been diagnosed as HIV-positive while living in Sweden the year before. His experience with the disease is reflected in the lyrics to his song "Ernest Borgnine". He has since spoken candidly of his diagnosis and explained, "I was messing around with my life and indulging in destructive behaviours and ended up getting a disease that could have totally been avoided. When I look at the fact that there are millions of children in Africa with HIV, who never got to choose, it makes me need to figure out why I let that happen to myself. That song is saying all those things."

== Discography ==
=== Albums ===
==== Solo ====
Solo albums, with selected details and chart positions
Title	Album details	Peak positions									
Title	Album details	BEL (FL)	BEL (WA)	FRA	GER	IRL	ITA	NL	SCO	SWE	UK
Queen of Denmark	Released: April 19, 2010; Label: Bella Union; Format: LP, CD, digital download	66	—	157	—	70	—	38	62	50	59
Pale Green Ghosts	Released: March 11, 2013; Label: Bella Union; Format: LP, CD, digital download	42	122	—	—	16	—	68	20	42	16
John Grant and the BBC Philharmonic Orchestra: Live in Concert	Released: December 1, 2014; Label: Bella Union; Format: CD	—	—	—	—	90	—	—	74	—	—
Grey Tickles, Black Pressure	Released: October 9, 2015; Label: Bella Union; Partisan; Format: LP, CD, digital download	46	87	122	89	3	99	34	2	—	5
Love Is Magic	Released: October 12, 2018; Label: Bella Union; Partisan; Format: LP, CD, digital download	122	—	—	—	64	—	192	9	—	17
Boy from Michigan	Released: June 25, 2021; Label: Partisan; Format: Box set, LP, digital download	—	—	—	—	34	—	—	2	—	8
The Art of the Lie	Released: June 14, 2024; Label: Bella Union; Format: LP, CD, cassette, digital download	—	—	—	—	82	—	—	5	—	28

==== With The Czars ====
- Moodswing (1996)
- The La Brea Tar Pits of Routine (1997)
- Before...But Longer (2000)
- The Ugly People vs the Beautiful People (2001)
- Goodbye (2004)
- Sorry I Made You Cry (2005)

==== With Creep Show ====
- Mr. Dynamite (2018)
- Yawning Abyss (2023)

==== Featured artist ====
- "John Grant" - on Proxy Music by Linda Thompson (2024)

=== EPs ===
- Gets Schooled (Rough Trade Records, 2013) – duet versions of five tracks from Rough Trade's Album of the Year Pale Green Ghosts

=== Singles ===
==== With The Czars ====
- "Val" (2000)
- "Side Effect" (2002)
- "X Would Rather Listen" (2002)
- "Paint the Moon" (2004)

==== Solo ====
- "Pale Green Ghosts" (2013)
- "GMF" with Sinéad O'Connor (2013)
- "Glacier" (2013)
- "Disappointing" (with Tracey Thorn (2015)
- "Love Is Magic" (2018)
- "He's Got His Mother's Hips" (2018)
- "Touch & Go" (2018)
- "Is He Strange" (2018)
- "The Only Baby" (2021)
- "Boy from Michigan" (2021)
- "Billy" (2021)
- "County Fair (Edit)" (2021)
- "Rhetorical Figure" (2021)
- "Faint Positive Lateral Flow" (2021)
- "God's Gonna Cut You Down" (2022)
- "Day is Done" (2023)
- "It's a Bitch" (2024)
- "It's a Bit Disconcerting" (2024)
- "The Child Catcher" (2024)

==== As featured artist ====
- "Mountaineers" – Susanne Sundfør featuring John Grant (2017)
- "Whiskey" – Bi-2 featuring John Grant (2017)
- "Kindling (Fickle Flame)" – Elbow featuring John Grant (2017)
- "Erase the Tapes" – Vessels featuring John Grant (2017)
- "Mr Dynamite" – John Grant and Wrangler as Creep Show (2018)
- "Cordelia" – Lost Horizons featuring John Grant (2021)
- "Love Is Alone" – GusGus featuring John Grant (2021)
- "Where Are Your Kids Tonight" – CMAT featuring John Grant (2023)
- “Stay Down, Lazarus” - Big Special featuring John Grant (2024)
