= Boy from Michigan =

Studio album by John Grant
- Released: June 25, 2021
- Recorded: 2020–2021
- Studio: Green House Studios (Reykjavík); Hljóðriti Studios (Hafnarfjörður)
- Genre: Synth-pop; indie rock
- Length: 75:18
- Label: Partisan
- Producer: John Grant; Cate Le Bon

John Grant chronology
Love Is Magic (2018)	Boy from Michigan (2021)	The Art of the Lie (2024)

Singles from Boy from Michigan
- 1. "Boy from Michigan" Released: March 25, 2021; 2. "Billy" Released: May 18, 2021

Boy from Michigan is the fifth studio album by American musician John Grant. It was released via Partisan Records on June 25, 2021.

== Release ==
In January 2021, Grant released the anti-Trump song "The Only Baby" with an accompanying music video. In March, he released the single "Boy from Michigan" and announced that his upcoming album would share the single's name. In May, the single "Billy" was released. The album was released on June 25, and received acclaim.

== Track listing ==
Boy from Michigan track listing
No.	Title	Length
1.	"Boy from Michigan"	7:37
2.	"County Fair"	5:09
3.	"The Rusty Bull"	7:58
4.	"The Cruise Room"	4:15
5.	"Mike and Julie"	6:20
6.	"Best in Me"	5:18
7.	"Rhetorical Figure"	3:58
8.	"Just So You Know"	7:57
9.	"Dandy Star"	6:55
10.	"Your Portfolio"	5:48
11.	"The Only Baby"	9:38
12.	"Billy"	4:25

== Personnel ==
=== Musicians ===
- John Grant – vocals, composer, drum programming, piano, synthesizer, synth-bass, synthesizer programming, vocoder, mixing
- Stella Mozgawa – drum programming, drums, percussion
- Paul Alexander – bass
- Stephen Black – clarinet, saxophone
- Euan Hinshelwood – saxophone
- Cate Le Bon – arrangement, bass, clarinet, guitar, percussion, saxophone, synthesizer, synth-bass

=== Production ===
- John Grant – production
- Heba Kadry – mastering
- Matt Pence – engineer
- Cate Le Bon – production
- Rhys Atkinson – design
- Samur Khouja – mixing, engineering
- Gil Corral – portraits
- Scott King – art direction
- Casey Raymond – artwork
- Rob Israel – artwork
