= Operation Bridger =

UK police protection programme for Members of Parliament

Operation Bridger is a nationwide police protection security programme in the United Kingdom designed to offer Members of Parliament (MPs) access to extra security in their homes and constituency offices. It was established in 2016 in the wake of the murder of Labour MP Jo Cox, who was killed at a constituency surgery.

In October 2021, following the murder of Conservative MP Sir David Amess, the National Police Chiefs' Council confirmed that every MP in the UK would be contacted by the chief constable of their local police force to discuss security arrangements as part of a wider review of MPs' security.
