= Love Is Magic =

Studio album by John Grant
- Released: October 12, 2018
- Studios: Echo Lab, Denton, Texas; Meme Tune Studio, London, England
- Genre: Synth-pop
- Length: 57:43
- Label: Bella Union
- Producers: John Grant; Paul Alexander; Craig Silvey

John Grant chronology
Grey Tickles, Black Pressure (2015)	Love Is Magic (2018)	Boy from Michigan (2021)

Singles from Love Is Magic
- 1. "Love Is Magic" Released: July 10, 2018; 2. "He's Got His Mother's Hips" Released: August 28, 2018; 3. "Touch & Go" Released: August 28, 2018; 4. "Is He Strange" Released: October 3, 2018

Love Is Magic is the fourth studio album by American musician John Grant. It was released via Bella Union on October 12, 2018.

== Release ==
On July 10, 2018, Grant announced the release of his fourth album, alongside the title track "Love Is Magic". Grant said of the album: "Each record I make is more of an amalgamation of who I am. The more I do this, the more I trust myself, and the closer I get to making what I imagine in my head."

On August 28, 2018, two new singles – "He’s Got His Mothers Hips" and "Touch & Go" – were released.

The fourth single "Is He Strange" was released on October 3, 2018.

== Tour ==
In support of the album, a tour was announced for the UK in October 2018 through to February 2019.

== Critical reception ==
Professional ratings
Aggregate scores
Source	Rating
Metacritic	78/100
Review scores
Source	Rating
The 405	7/10
AllMusic	4/5 stars
Clash	6/10
DIY	4/5 stars
Drowned in Sound	9/10
The Line of Best Fit	8/10
MusicOMH	4/5 stars
NME	4/5 stars
PopMatters	7/10
Under the Radar	8/10

Love Is Magic was met with "generally favorable" reviews from critics. At Metacritic, which assigns a weighted average rating out of 100 to reviews from mainstream publications, this release received an average score of 78, based on 18 reviews. Aggregator Album of the Year gave the release a 77 out of 100 based on a critical consensus of 22 reviews.

Michael Cyrs from The 405 said the album is Grant's "most consistent and enjoyable work yet." and it "still showcases his trademark unpredictability. Soft love songs still turn sexual. Robotic voices are paired with Grant's prettiest singing." Anna Byrne from The Line of Best Fit said the album is Grant's "fourth solo record released exactly three years after the last, and you experience his customary level of brutal honesty, irresistible vulnerability and wit – but with the electronics dialled way up. The specificity of the lyrics and the boldness of the electronic orchestration should theoretically preclude this – but Grant lets the emotions that drive them show through enough that you can't help but connect." Lee Adcock from Drowned in Sound observed "a writer with his fingers on the pulse of what's really magic", and drew comparisons to artists such as the Police, Peter Gabriel, OMD, and the Human League.

=== Chart performance ===
The album charted at number 17 on the UK Official Albums Chart on October 25, 2018, and number 9 on the Scottish Albums Chart.

=== Accolades ===
Accolades for Love is Magic
Publication	Accolade	Rank
The Independent	The Independent's Top 40 Albums of 2018	16
Under the Radar	Under the Radar's Top 100 Albums of 2018	21

== Track listing ==
Love Is Magic track listing
No.	Title	Length
1.	"Metamorphosis"	5:41
2.	"Love Is Magic"	6:21
3.	"Tempest"	6:31
4.	"Preppy Boy"	4:46
5.	"Smug Cunt"	6:23
6.	"He's Got His Mother's Hips"	3:39
7.	"Diet Gum"	7:25
8.	"Is He Strange"	5:17
9.	"The Common Snipe"	6:37
10.	"Touch and Go"	5:03

== Personnel ==
Musicians

- John Grant – primary artist, vocals, piano, keyboard, producer
- Paul Alexander – guitar, keyboards, producer
- Scott Lee – bass
- Joey McClellan – guitar
- Daniel Creamer – keyboards
- Bobby Sparks – clavinet

Production

- Rhys Atkinson – design
- Matt Pence – engineer
- Craig Silvey – mixing
- Scott King – design
- Greg Calbi – mastering
- Jonathan de Villiers – photography

== Charts ==
Chart performance for Love Is Magic
Chart (2018)	Peak position
Belgian Albums (Ultratop Flanders)	122
Dutch Albums (Album Top 100)	192
Scottish Albums (Official Charts)	9
Spanish Albums (Promusicae)	93
UK Albums (Official Charts)	17
UK Independent Albums (Official Charts)	1
