= Murder of Jo Cox =

2016 murder in England

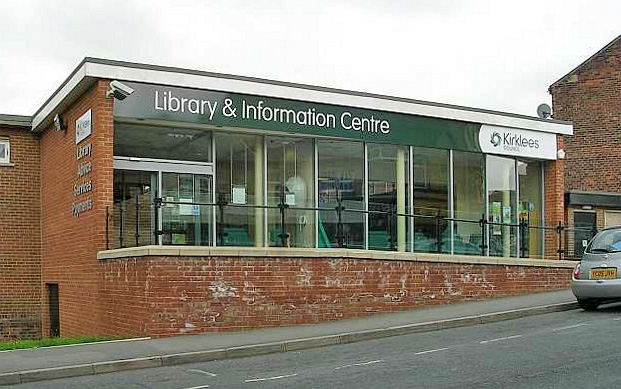
- Cox was killed outside Birstall library
- Location: 53°43′53″N 1°39′40″W; Market Street, Birstall, West Yorkshire, England
- Date: 16 June 2016; 10 years ago c. 12:53 pm (BST)
- Attack type: Shooting; stabbing; assassination; domestic terrorism
- Weapons: Sawed-off Weihrauch .22 caliber bolt-action rifle; Dagger
- Deaths: Jo Cox
- Injuries: Bernard Carter-Kenny
- Motive: Far-right extremism
- Convicted: Thomas Alexander Mair

On 16 June 2016, Jo Cox, a British Labour Party politician and Member of Parliament (MP) for Batley and Spen, died after being shot and stabbed multiple times in Birstall, West Yorkshire. In November 2016, 53-year-old Thomas Alexander Mair was found guilty of her murder and other offences connected to the killing in an act of terrorism. The judge concluded that Mair wanted to advance white supremacy and exclusive nationalism most associated with Nazism and its modern forms. He was sentenced to life imprisonment with a whole life order.

The incident was the first killing of a sitting British MP since the death of Conservative MP Ian Gow, who was assassinated by the Provisional Irish Republican Army in 1990, and the first murder of a politician in the United Kingdom since county councillor Andrew Pennington was killed in 2000.

== Attack ==
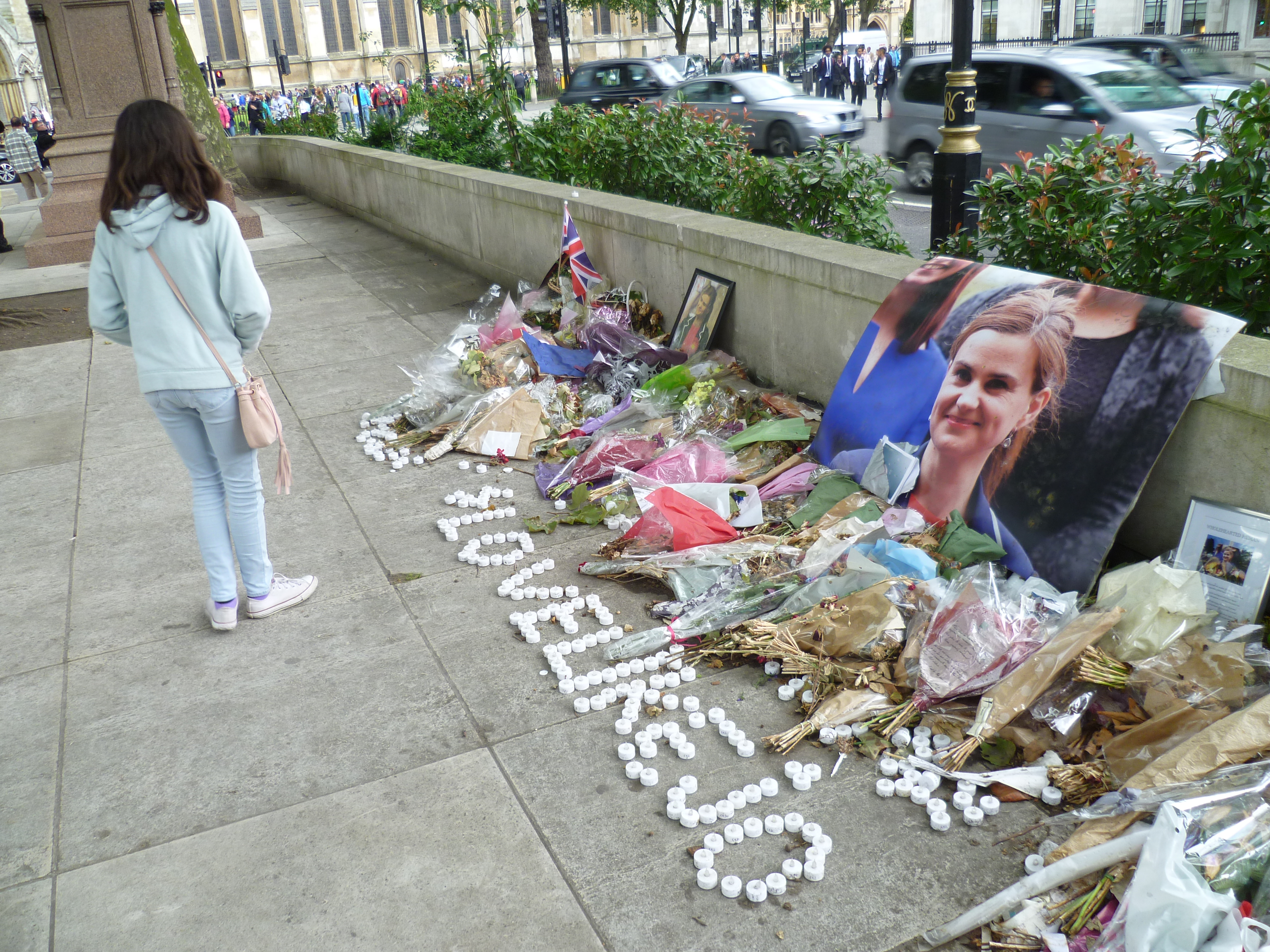
Memorial to Cox in the days after her death, Parliament Square, London

Jo Cox was elected to represent the parliamentary constituency Batley and Spen at the 2015 general election, having spent several years working for the international humanitarian charity Oxfam.

On 16 June 2016, Cox was on her way to meet constituents at a routine surgery in Birstall, West Yorkshire, when Thomas Mair shot her twice in the head and once in the chest with a modified .22 hunting rifle then stabbed her 15 times outside a library on Market Street. Cox died of her injuries shortly after being admitted to Leeds General Infirmary. She was 41 years old.

The retired mines rescuer Bernard Carter-Kenny, 77, was also stabbed when coming to Cox's aid; he was subsequently awarded the George Medal for his bravery. Another witness followed Mair and identified him to police. Mair was arrested about a mile from the murder scene unarmed by police constables Craig Nicholls and Jonathan Wright, who were later awarded the Queen's Gallantry Medal.

== Perpetrator ==
The perpetrator was Thomas Alexander Mair, a 53-year-old unemployed gardener born in Scotland. Mair had mental health problems, though he was declared sane in the moment of the crime. He believed that individuals of liberal and left-wing political viewpoints, and the mainstream media were the cause of the world's problems. Writers at The Guardian suggested that he targeted Cox, a "passionate defender" of the European Union and immigration, because he saw her as "one of 'the collaborators' [and] a traitor" to white people.

Mair had links to British and American far-right political groups including the neo-fascist National Front, the United States-based neo-Nazi organisation National Alliance and the English Defence League; he had attended far-right gatherings and purchased publications from the National Alliance and other outlets, to some of which he had sent letters and expressed support for South African apartheid.

In his home were found Nazi regalia, far-right books, and information on the construction of bombs. He had searched the internet for information about the British National Party, South African apartheid, the Ku Klux Klan, prominent Jewish people, matricide, white supremacy, the Nazi Party, the SS, Israel, mass shootings, serial killers, Frazier Glenn Miller Jr., William Hague, Ian Gow (another assassinated MP), and Norwegian far-right terrorist Anders Behring Breivik (about whose case he collected newspaper clippings). He also owned Nazi iconography and books and films related to the Nazis. A police official described Mair as a "loner in the truest sense of the word ... who never held down a job, never had a girlfriend [and] never [had] any friends". The Guardian said that he "appears to have fantasised about killing a 'collaborator' for more than 17 years, drawing inspiration from David Copeland".

The evening before killing Cox, Mair visited a treatment centre in Birstall seeking help for depression; he was told to return the next day for an appointment. Mair's health was not part of the defence case in the trial. After his arrest, he was examined by a psychiatrist who found no evidence that Mair's mental health was so impaired that he could not be held responsible for his conduct.

In October 2020, a press report stated that West Yorkshire Police's Homicide and Major Enquiries Team continued to investigate how he acquired the weapon used, which remains a mystery. The lack of communication on Mair's phone was described by Detective Chief Inspector Nick Wallen, who led the investigation into Mair, as not indicating someone who was "immersed in criminality". A West Yorkshire Police spokeswoman said: "A lengthy investigation was carried out to try and establish how Thomas Mair acquired this firearm. All lines of enquiry have for the time being been exhausted, but the investigation will be revisited if further information comes to light."

== Trial, conviction and sentence ==
On 18 June 2016, asked to confirm his name in Westminster Magistrates' Court, Mair said, "My name is death to traitors, freedom for Britain." His lawyers said there was no indication of how he would plead. Mair was remanded in custody and the magistrate suggested he be seen by a psychiatrist.

At a bail hearing on 20 June, the judge remanded Mair in custody until a hearing to be held "under terrorism-related protocols". At the next hearing on 23 June, the judge said the case would be handled as part of "the terrorism case management list", on which cases related to terrorism as defined by the Terrorism Act 2000 are placed. At a September 2016 hearing, Mair's counsel said they would not advance a diminished responsibility argument. At another hearing the following month, Mair—again appearing by video link—refused to enter a plea; the judge entered not-guilty pleas on his behalf.

Mair's trial began at the Old Bailey on 14 November 2016. He made no attempt to defend himself. Witnesses testified that during the attack, Mair had cried out "This is for Britain", "keep Britain independent", and "Britain first". On 23 November 2016, the jury took about 90 minutes to convict Mair of Cox's murder, grievous bodily harm against Bernard Carter-Kenny, possession of a firearm with intent, and possession of a dagger. The same day, Mair was sentenced to life imprisonment; the judge said he had no doubt Mair murdered Cox to advance political, racial, and ideological causes of violent white supremacism and exclusive nationalism most associated with Nazism and its modern forms. This made the case exceptionally serious; accordingly the judge imposed a whole life term, meaning Mair will never be eligible for parole. As confirmed by the Crown Prosecution Service, Mair's conviction for a crime amounting to a terrorism offence also means he is officially classed as a terrorist by the United Kingdom.

== Reaction ==
Cox's funeral was held in her constituency on 15 July and thousands of people paid their respects as the cortège passed.

=== United Kingdom ===
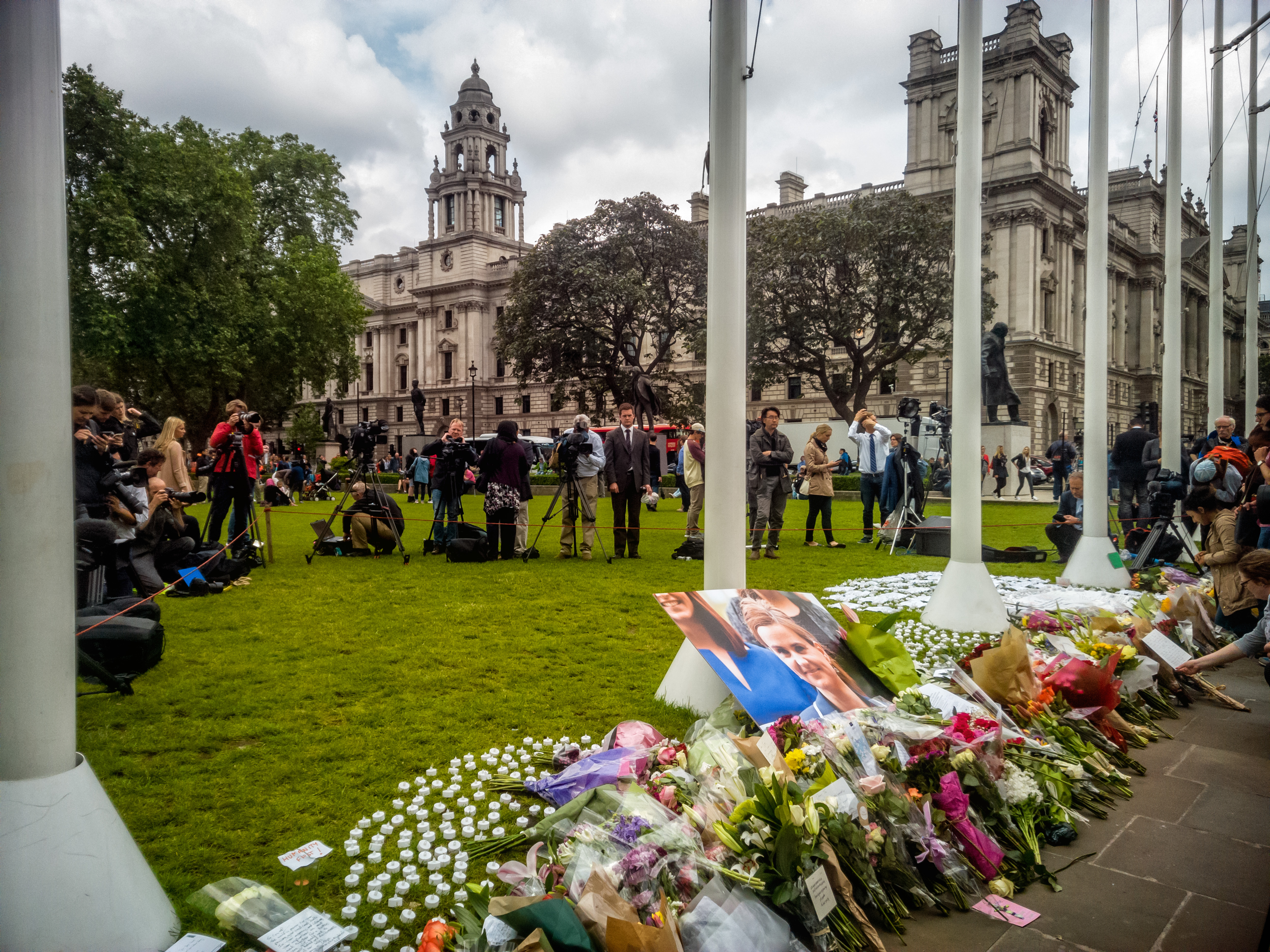
Cox's memorial at Parliament Square in London on 17 June 2016

Cox's husband Brendan issued a statement on 16 June, the day of her death, which said:

Today is the beginning of a new chapter in our lives. More difficult, more painful, less joyful, less full of love. I and Jo's friends and family are going to work every moment of our lives to love and nurture our kids and to fight against the hate that killed Jo. Jo believed in a better world and she fought for it every day of her life with an energy, and a zest for life that would exhaust most people. She would have wanted two things above all else to happen now, one that our precious children are bathed in love and two, that we all unite to fight against the hatred that killed her. Hate doesn't have a creed, race or religion, it is poisonous. Jo would have no regrets about her life, she lived every day of it to the full.

The statement was described by Labour leader Jeremy Corbyn as "one of the most moving statements I've ever heard from somebody so recently bereaved". In a later interview, broadcast by the BBC on 21 June, Brendan Cox said of his wife:

She was a politician and she had very strong political views and I believe she was killed because of those views ... I think she died because of them and she would want to stand up for those in death as much as she did in life.

Following the death, Union Flags on British public buildings, including the Palace of Westminster, Buckingham Palace, and 10 Downing Street, were flown at half mast. It was announced that the Queen would write a private letter of condolence to Cox's widower. The counting of votes in the Tooting by-election held on the day Cox died, was halted for a two-minute silence.

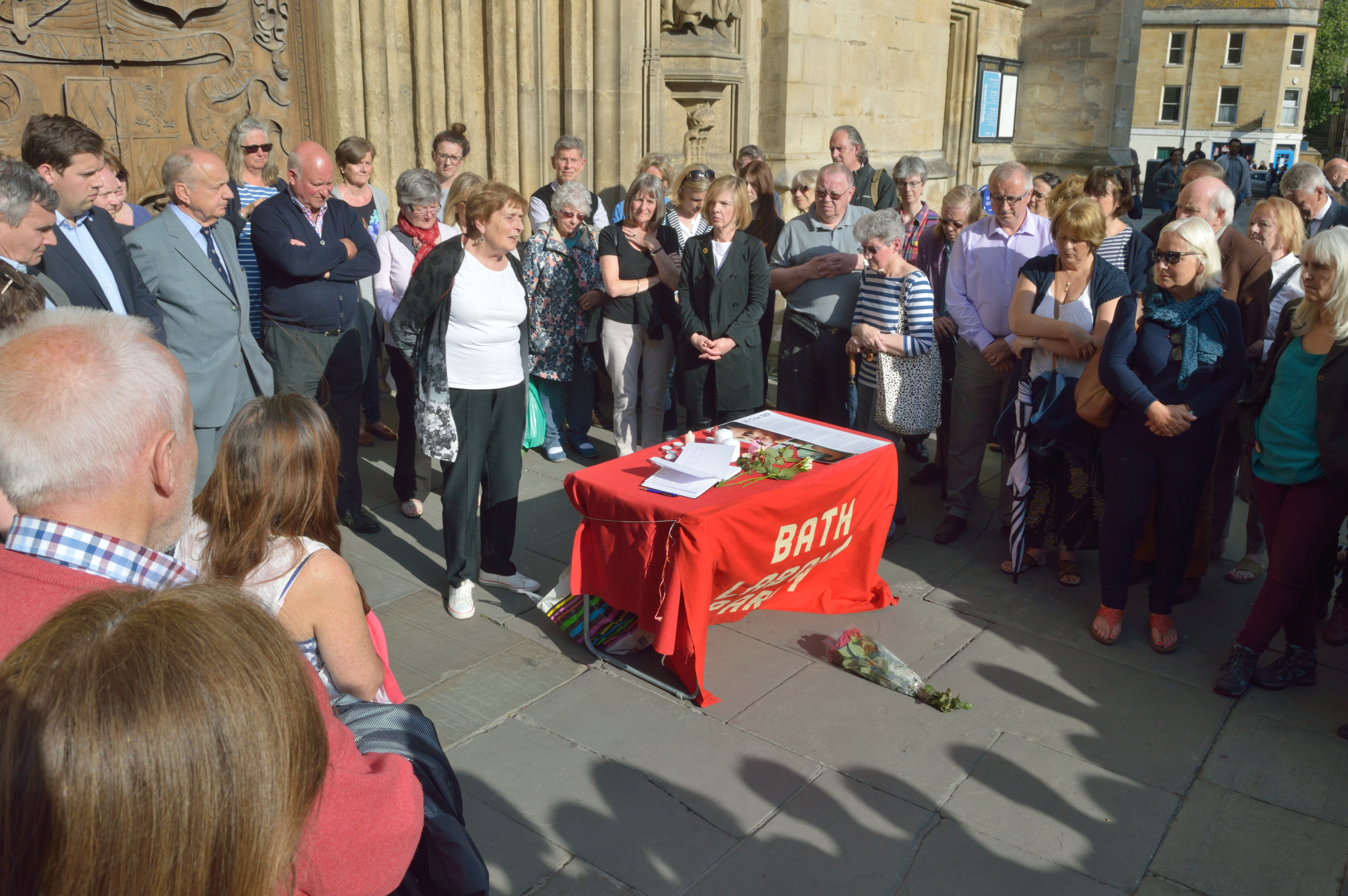
A vigil held in remembrance outside Bath Abbey, one of the many that were held around Britain

Corbyn stated, "The whole of the Labour Party and Labour family – and indeed the whole country – will be in shock at the horrific murder of Jo Cox today" and paid tribute to a "wonderful woman". A vigil attended by senior Labour Party politicians, including Corbyn, was held in Parliament Square. First Minister of Scotland Nicola Sturgeon described the news as "utterly shocking and tragic news, which has left everyone stunned". Chief Minister of Gibraltar Fabian Picardo stated, "This is a truly appalling attack on a serving MP working hard to serve her community. This horrific act is an attack on democracy and the British freedoms that Jo Cox worked so diligently and passionately to defend." Rosena Allin-Khan, who won the Tooting by-election for Labour, used her victory speech to pay tribute to Cox, saying, "Jo's death reminds us that our democracy is precious but fragile. We must never forget to cherish it." One day after the attack, Corbyn and Prime Minister David Cameron visited Birstall, where they joined locals to lay floral tributes to Cox. Cameron said:

The most profound thing that has happened is that two children have lost their mother, a loving husband has lost a loving wife, and parliament has lost one of its most passionate and brilliant campaigners, someone who epitomised the fact that politics is about serving others.

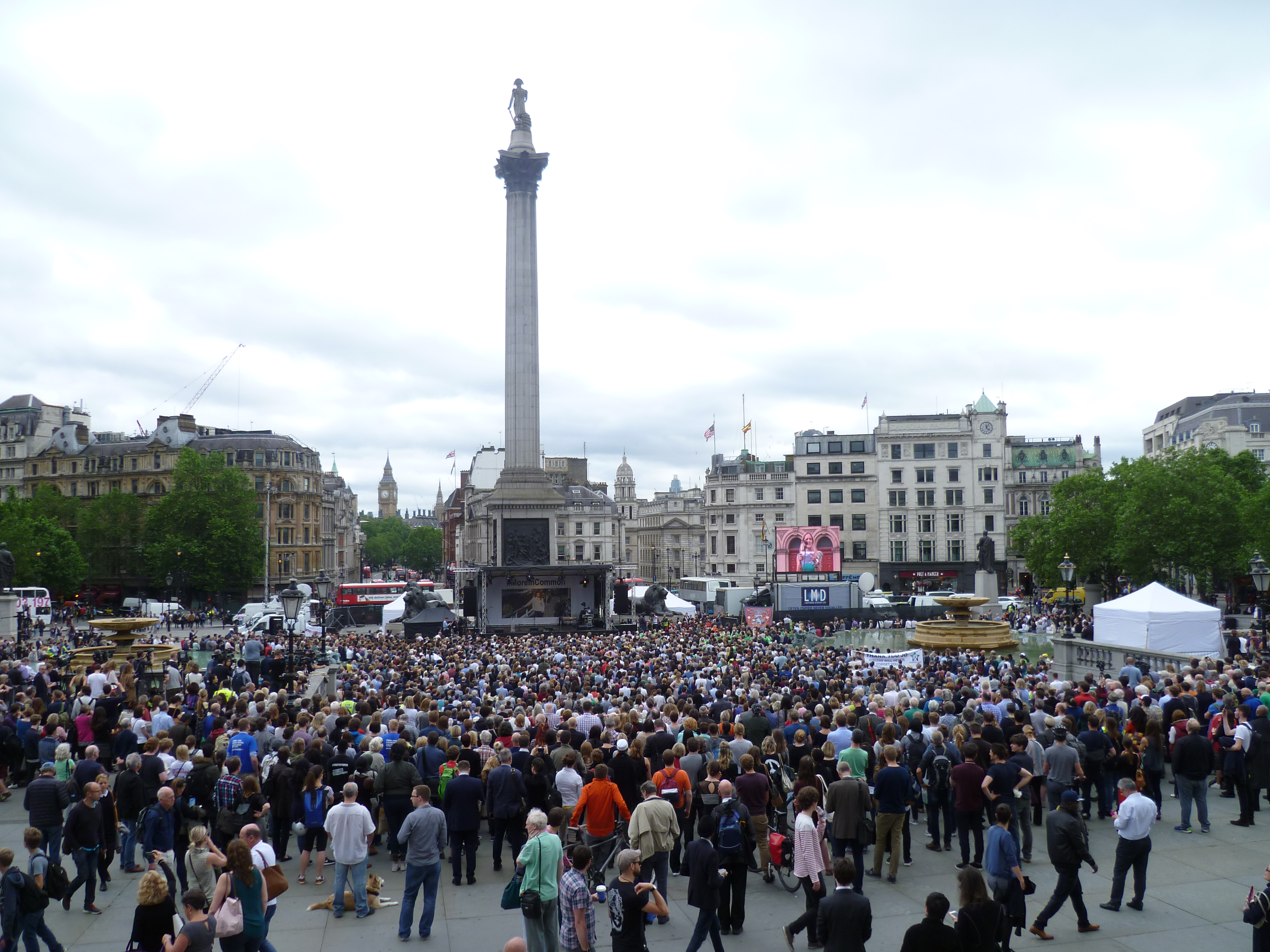
More in Common event on 22 June 2016 in Trafalgar Square, London

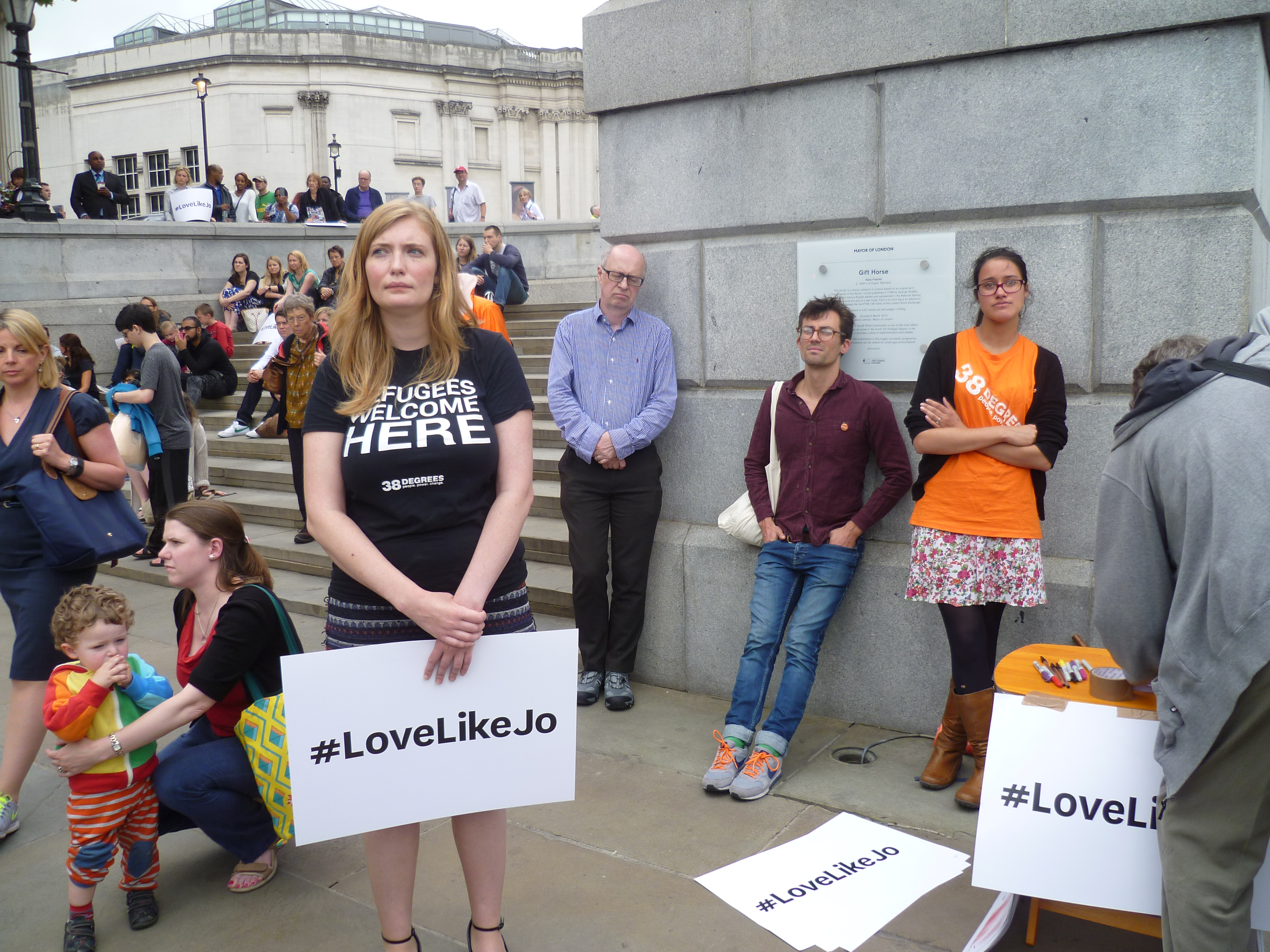
Love Like Jo campaigners listening to tributes in her memory

Veteran Labour politician Neil Kinnock, whose wife Glenys had supported Cox's candidacy and whose son Stephen shared an office with her, described the family's grief in a BBC television interview. Writing for the Financial Times, Sarah Brown, who worked with Cox on a campaign to reduce the number of deaths in pregnancy and childbirth, said, "Jo's life testified to her view that tolerance is not enough. We must tackle the causes of prejudice and discrimination, teach ourselves how to treat others equally and do far more to help those most in need." Cox was remembered at church services held on Sunday 19 June, including one held at St Peter's Church, Birstall, where Rev. Paul Knight described her as a "fervent advocate for the poor and the oppressed".

On 17 June, friends of Cox established a fund in her memory. Proceeds were to be split between three non-profit groups; anti-extremist group Hope not Hate, Royal Voluntary Service that benefits the elderly, and the Syrian volunteer search-and-rescue group White Helmets. The fund raised over £500,000 in one day, and £1 million had been raised by 20 June. Significant donations to the Jo Cox Fund included an award of £375,000 that was raised from fines resulting from the Libor banking scandal. Proceeds from a cover version of the 1979 Bette Midler song "The Rose", recorded and released by Batley Community Choir, also benefited the fund. Friends organised "More in Common – Celebrating the life of Jo Cox", a public event in her remembrance held in Trafalgar Square, London, on 22 June – the date of her 42nd birthday. The event saw Cox's family transported on a memorial boat laden with floral tributes along the River Thames to Westminster, where crowds listened to speakers including Brendan Cox, Malala Yousafzai, Bono, Bill Nighy and Gillian Anderson.

Similar events took place around the world, including Batley and Spen, Auckland, Paris, Washington D.C., and Buenos Aires.

On 20 June, Oxfam announced it would release Stand As One – Live at Glastonbury 2016, an album of live performances from the 2016 Glastonbury Festival, in memory of Cox. Proceeds from the album, released on 11 July, went towards helping the charity's work with refugees. Musicians and festivalgoers at Glastonbury, held later that week, also paid tribute to Cox; at one concert Billy Bragg led the audience in a rendition of "We Shall Overcome" and was joined on stage by women wearing suffragette ribbons.

Parliament was recalled on Monday 20 June to allow MPs to pay tribute to Cox. In a break from convention (under which MPs sit grouped together by party), MPs considered whether to sit together on a non-party basis for the memorial sitting, a suggestion made by Conservative MP Jason McCartney. Only a few MPs chose to do so, however. Following the sitting of Parliament, MPs and others attended a memorial service at nearby St Margaret's Church. On 20 June a petition was created calling for Bernard Carter-Kenny, who had intervened in the attack, to be awarded the George Cross. He was awarded the George Medal in the 2017 Birthday Honours. Carter-Kenny died of cancer on 14 August 2017.

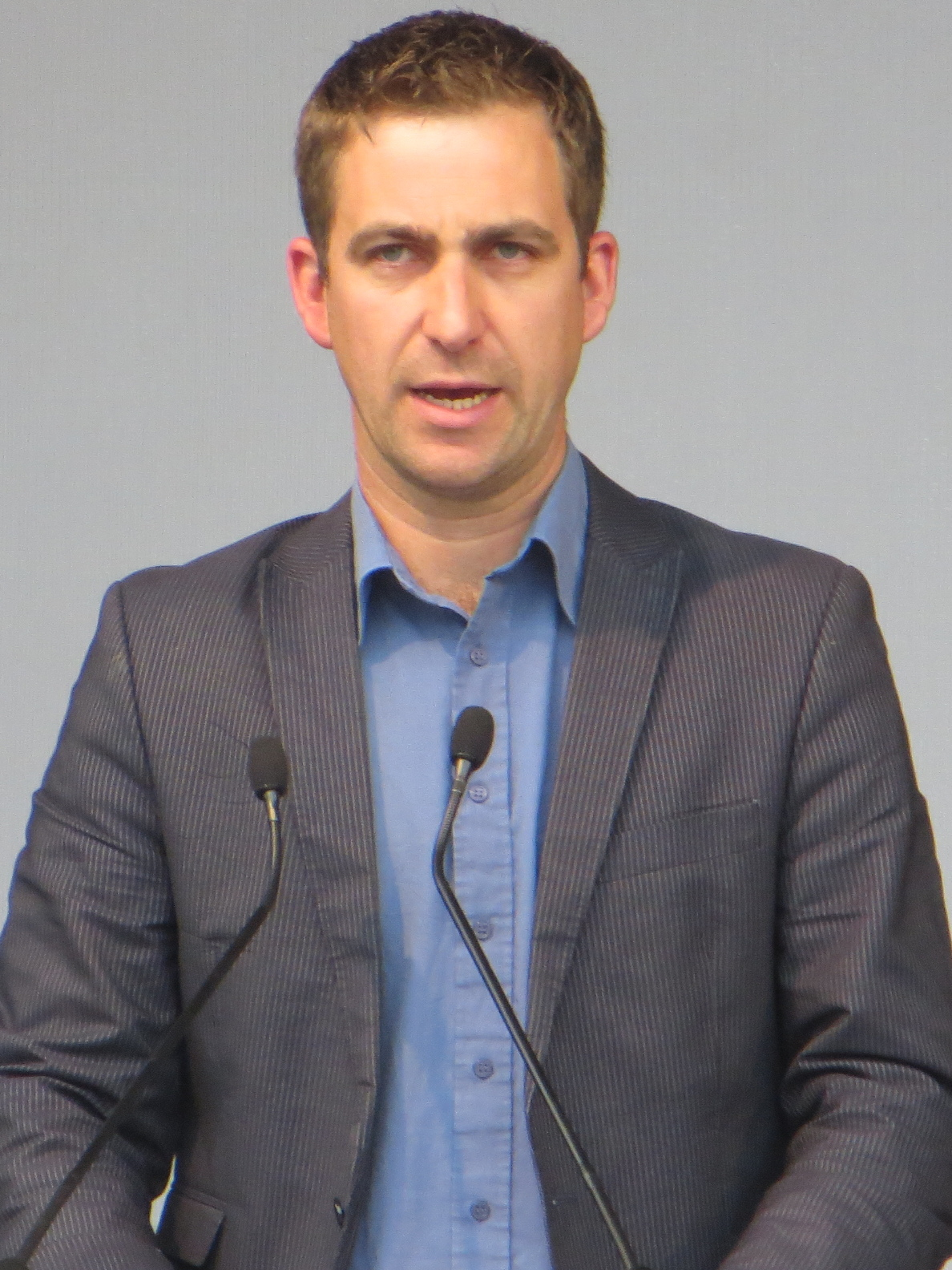
Brendan Cox at the Trafalgar Square tribute to his wife, on 22 June 2016

In July 2016, organisers of the annual Tolpuddle Martyrs' Festival, an event in Dorset celebrating the efforts of a group of agricultural workers to form a trade union, dedicated that year's event to Cox's memory. In August, cyclists took part in the Jo Cox Way, a five-day, 260-mile cycle ride from West Yorkshire to Westminster to raise money for charities Cox supported. The event raised £1,500. At its 2016 party conference held in Liverpool in September, Labour launched the Jo Cox Women in Leadership Programme, a mentoring scheme facilitated by the Labour Women's Network and designed to help women into leadership roles. In November 2016, MPs and musicians collaborated on a version of the Rolling Stones song "You Can't Always Get What You Want" for release as a charity single in Cox's memory and to raise funds for the launch of the Jo Cox Foundation. Artists who took part in the recording include Ricky Wilson of the Kaiser Chiefs, Steve Harley of Cockney Rebel, KT Tunstall, and David Gray. Sir Mick Jagger and Keith Richards subsequently announced they would be waiving their royalties from sales of the single. BBC Two aired the documentary Jo Cox: Death of An MP on 13 June 2017 to coincide with the first anniversary of her murder.

Also in June 2017, to mark the first anniversary of Cox's death, her family and friends promoted a weekend of events titled "The Great Get Together"; events included picnics, street parties and concerts. The Great Get Together was also supported by former British Prime Ministers John Major, Tony Blair, Gordon Brown, and David Cameron, all of whom who recorded a joint video paying tribute to Cox and urging people to celebrate her life. The video was aired as part of Channel 4's late-night talk show The Last Leg on the eve of the first anniversary of her death. On 24 June 2017, a coat of arms designed by Cox's children was unveiled by them at the House of Commons, where MPs killed in office are remembered by heraldic shields. Rock group U2 paid tribute to Cox during the UK leg of their 2017 Joshua Tree Tour; lead vocalist Bono, who had worked with her on the Make Poverty History campaign, dedicated the song "Ultraviolet (Light My Way)" to her memory.

=== International ===
Senior politicians around the world paid tribute to Cox and expressed shock at her death. United States President Barack Obama telephoned Cox's husband to offer condolences on behalf of the American people, and invited the family to meet him at the White House. The meeting took place in September after Brendan Cox attended a refugee summit in New York. Former U.S. Representative Gabby Giffords of Arizona, who was seriously injured in a shooting in 2011, stated she was "absolutely sickened to hear of the assassination of Jo Cox. She was young, courageous, and hardworking. A rising star, mother, and wife." Several European leaders expressed their shock at the news, among them German Chancellor Angela Merkel, who described the attack as "terrible" and called for a moderation of language to counter radicalisation and to foster respect. Overseas politicians who knew Cox personally included New Zealand Labour MP Phil Twyford, who said, "Jo will be sorely missed by her family, her friends, UK politics and the international Labour movement".

In the Canadian House of Commons, NDP MP Nathan Cullen, who had known Cox for several years, described her in an emotional tribute as "a dedicated Labour MP and a long advocate of human rights in Britain and around the world". Numerous other tributes were paid to Cox, including those by public figures in Australia, Canada, Czech Republic, Finland, France, Greece, Ireland, Italy, Netherlands, New Zealand, the PLO, Spain, Sweden and the United States.

In July 2016, the Italian Parliament established the Cox Committee, a cross-party committee on intolerance, xenophobia, racism, and hate crime, naming it in honour of Cox. In August, her nomination of the Syrian Civil Defence for the 2016 Nobel Peace Prize was accepted by the Nobel Committee. Earlier that year, Cox had written to the Committee praising the work of the civilian voluntary emergency rescue organisation known as the White Helmets, and nominating them for the prize. The nomination gained the support of 20 of her fellow MPs and about 12 high-profile personalities including George Clooney, Daniel Craig, Chris Martin and Michael Palin. The nomination was also supported by members of Canada's New Democratic Party, who urged Stéphane Dion, the country's Foreign Affairs Minister, to give his backing on behalf of Canada.

A street, formerly Rue Pierre Étienne Flandin after Pierre Étienne Flandin, in Avallon, a town in the Yonne département of France, was renamed Rue Jo Cox in May 2017.

=== Reactions to Mair's conviction ===
In a statement to the BBC following the conviction of Mair, Cox's widower Brendan said he felt only pity for Mair and expressed hope "that Jo's death will have meaning" in persuading people "that we hold more in common than that which divides us".

In The Times, David Aaronovitch asked why "some people – all of them pro-Brexit as it happens" were "so keen to dismiss the first (and accurate) reports of Mair's words?", claiming such people "resisted because deep down they feared that aspects of the language or direction of the Brexit campaign they legitimately supported had emboldened extremism. While they themselves were in no way permissive of the act, might they in some way have been permissive of the motive? Or even of the mood?". In his article, Aaronovitch cited official Home Office figures showing a rise in race-hate crime.

Only two British newspapers did not feature a picture of Cox on their front pages as her murderer was arrested: the Financial Times, which focused on the first autumn statement from the Chancellor of the Exchequer, Philip Hammond; and the Daily Mail. The Mail was criticised for its focus on Mair's mental health and thoughts of matricide instead of his extremist political motivations. Owen Jones tweeted, "The coverage of Michael Adebowale – one of Lee Rigby's killers – did not focus on his history of mental illness. It focused on his ideology." In its print edition, the Mail placed its coverage of Mair's conviction on page 30, which prompted LBC radio presenter James O'Brien to accuse the paper of double standards, saying the Mail "has chosen to put the murder by a neo-Nazi of a serving British MP ... on page 30. I don't really understand why. Unless a murder by a neo-Nazi is less offensive to the sensibilities of the editor of this newspaper than a murder by a radical Islamist." The focus the Mail gave rise to the conspiracy theory that Mair "may have murdered MP Jo Cox because he feared losing his home of 40 years to an immigrant family" led to the paper being accused by Jane Matrinson in The Guardian of normalising anti-immigrant prejudice, which she saw as a factor in Cox's murder.

It has been noted that the views held by Mair—including anti-immigrant and anti-refugee sentiment—are part of mainstream British political discourse. By describing the murder in the context of Nazism, the judge separated the sentiments from modern political discourse, giving a "free pass" to contemporary extremist groups, public figures and press whose rhetoric were likely to have influenced Mair.

== Aftermath ==
Cox's death was the first killing of a sitting British MP since Eastbourne MP Ian Gow was killed by the Provisional Irish Republican Army in 1990, and the first serious assault since Stephen Timms was stabbed by Roshonara Choudhry in an attempted assassination in 2010. Another example of an attack on an MP while carrying out constituency duties was the attack on Nigel Jones in 2000, resulting in the death of his assistant, local councillor Andrew Pennington.

Many MPs went ahead with planned constituency surgeries scheduled on the day after Cox's death with increased security. A spokeswoman for the National Police Chiefs' Council said police forces had been asked to remind MPs to be vigilant about their personal safety; it said, "Officers will offer further guidance and advice where an MP requests it on a case-by-case basis depending on any specific threat or risk". The party whips' offices urged MPs to discuss security measures with their local police forces.

In July 2016, Kevin McKeever, a Labour politician and partner in Portland Communications – a public relations firm accused of playing an instrumental role in an attempt to force the resignation of Jeremy Corbyn – received an alleged death threat telling him he should "prepare to be coxed". Commenting on the incident, and other threats MPs had received, Ruth Price, Cox's parliamentary assistant, urged people to "move away from the baseless, nasty and intimidating abuse MPs currently face".

Cox's murder was also explicitly referenced in the social media posts of a man who was jailed for four months in April 2017 for making death threats towards the then-MP for Eastbourne Caroline Ansell of the Conservative party. Two months after the death of Cox, at least 25 MPs received identical death threats, including the Labour MP Chris Bryant. Bryant said the threats were "particularly disturbing ... [in] that a lot of these threats are to women. I think women MPs, gay MPs, ethnic minority MPs get the brunt of it."

At the time of Cox's death, MPs wishing to make additional security arrangements were required to apply to the Independent Parliamentary Standards Authority (IPSA), the watchdog overseeing their expenses. On 20 July, the House of Commons Estimates Committee voted to strip IPSA of this responsibility amid concerns over the time-frame of the process. MPs were offered training sessions in Krav Maga, a form of unarmed combat that combines judo, jujitsu, boxing, and street fighting. The Yorkshire Post reported that the first session, held in early August, was attended by two MPs and 18 assistants.

Cox's murder took place a week before the 2016 European Union membership referendum. The rival official campaigns suspended their activities as a mark of respect. David Cameron cancelled a planned rally in Gibraltar supporting British EU membership. Campaigning resumed on Sunday 19 June. Polling officials in the Yorkshire and Humber region halted the counting of referendum ballots on the evening of 23 June to observe a minute's silence. The referendum resulted in a vote in favour of the United Kingdom leaving the European Union.

The 2017 general election campaign was suspended for an hour on 21 May 2017, as politicians held a truce in memory of Cox ahead of the vote.

Following Cox's murder, the Conservative Party, Liberal Democrats, UK Independence Party (UKIP), and the Green Party announced they would not contest the ensuing by-election in her constituency as a mark of respect; Brendan Cox also ruled out standing for the seat. Tracy Brabin was chosen as Labour's candidate on 23 September, and elected to the seat on 20 October. Nine other candidates contested the seat. They included three candidates who stated their intention to stand before the election was confirmed. On 20 June, Jack Buckby, a former member of the British National Party announced he would be a candidate in the by-election for Liberty GB. On 18 July, the English Democrats announced that their deputy chair, Thérèse Hirst, would also stand. Although UKIP did not contest the seat, UKIP member Waqas Ali Khan announced on 6 August he would stand as an independent.

In the days after Cox's death, Arron Banks, founder of the Leave.EU campaign for Britain's withdrawal from the European Union, conducted private polling to determine whether the incident would affect the referendum's outcome. After disclosing the matter to LBC radio presenter Iain Dale, he was challenged as to whether such a poll was tasteless. Banks rejected the suggestion, saying, "We were hoping to see what the effect of the event was. That is an interesting point of view, whether it would shift public opinion ... I don't see it as very controversial." Likewise, Gary Jones of the Mirror pressurised political editor Nigel Nelson to write a front-page Mirror story on "the Jo effect", saying her death had swung support to Remain in a new opinion poll under the headline: "Tragic Jo's Death Sparks Poll Surge" despite only 192 of the 2,046 answers ComRes received being after the murder and that ComRes stating, "the figures should be treated with a degree of caution given the sample size".

At a speech to the London School of Economics in September 2016, Martin Schulz, the President of the European Parliament, said the "nasty" referendum debate was a contributing factor in Cox's death. The comments were swiftly criticised by some of Cox's colleagues, including leading Eurosceptic Conservative politician Jacob Rees-Mogg, who described them as "trivialising" her death.

Cox's killing has been likened to that of Swedish politician Anna Lindh in 2003. Lindh was stabbed to death shortly before Sweden's referendum on joining the euro, which she supported. Campaigning was also suspended after her killing. Swedish newspaper Dagens Nyheter said, "Like Jo Cox, Anna Lindh was a young, successful politician, and both were the mothers of two children. Both were also participating in campaigns for the EU when they were murdered".

== See also ==
- Murder of David Amess
- Murder of Walter Lübcke
- Operation Bridger, established to offer MPs access to extra security in the wake of the murder
- Murder of Iryna Farion
