= The Art of the Lie =

Studio album by John Grant
- Released: June 14, 2024
- Studio: Moon Zero Two (Reykjavík); Microcosm MKII (London); Hoxa HQ (London); Memetune (Cornwall)
- Length: 61:45
- Label: Bella Union
- Producer: Ivor Guest

John Grant chronology
Boy from Michigan (2021)	The Art of the Lie (2024)

The Art of the Lie is the sixth studio album by American musician John Grant, released on June 14, 2024, through Bella Union. It received positive reviews from critics.

== Critical reception ==
Professional ratings
Aggregate scores
Source	Rating
Metacritic	85/100
Review scores
Source	Rating
Clash	8/10
DIY	4/5 stars
The Line of Best Fit	8/10
Mojo	4/5 stars
Uncut	8/10
The Guardian	4/5 stars

According to the review aggregator Metacritic, The Art of the Lie received "universal acclaim" based on a weighted average score of 85 out of 100 from 10 critic scores. Uncut commented that Grant is "best on matters of the heart: 'Father' is a spectral journey to a lost 1970s of family intimacy and may be the most affecting song yet in a catalogue stuffed with heartbreakers". Mojo felt that "with aid of latter-day Grace Jones producer Ivor Guest, his upbeat tendencies manifest in talk box-voiced electronic funk (think Roger Troutman/Zapp) that is more flattering, particularly when matched to the singer's biting wit on 'All That School' and the MAGA-bashing 'Meek AF'".

Chris Todd of The Line of Best Fit called it "one of Grant's richest & most satisfying sounding albums thus far" on which he "embraces his love of eighties IBM/EBM music and kitchen sink gothery from the likes of Soft Cell, alongside the end-of-the-world electronica of Throbbing Gristle". DIY's Lisa Wright described The Art of the Lie as "a record musically cleaved in two" with "twitchy 'hits' – the '80s, vocoder-doused funk strut of opener 'All That School for Nothing', or the sassy wobbles of lead single 'It's a Bitch' – but they're directly juxtaposed with moments of total devastation". Reviewing the album for Clash, Luke Winstanley concluded that it is "a perfect distillation of everything one yearns for in John Grant's music; his golden baritone voice, icy electronic soundscapes, emotive balladry, sumptuous funk and phenomenal diction".

=== Year-end lists ===
Select year-end rankings for The Art of the Lie
Publication/critic	Accolade	Rank	Ref.
MOJO	The Best Albums Of 2024	11	
Rough Trade UK	Albums of the Year 2024	58	

== Track listing ==
All tracks are written by John Grant.

The Art of the Lie track listing
No.	Title	Length
1.	"All That School for Nothing"	5:20
2.	"Marbles"	7:14
3.	"Father"	7:02
4.	"Mother and Son"	7:26
5.	"Twisted Scriptures"	0:20
6.	"Meek AF"	6:29
7.	"It's a Bitch"	4:32
8.	"Daddy"	6:46
9.	"The Child Catcher"	7:14
10.	"Laura Lou"	3:52
11.	"Zeitgeist"	5:30
Total length:		61:45

== Personnel ==
Musicians

- John Grant – vocals, synthesizers, keyboards, programming (all tracks); spinet (tracks 9, 10)
- Kurt Uenala – additional programming
- Dave Okumu – guitar (tracks 1–4, 9–11), Vowel solo (10)
- Robin Mullarkay – bass guitar (tracks 1–3, 6, 7), fretless bass guitar (4, 8–11)
- Ed Baden Powell – guitar (tracks 1, 2, 6, 7)
- Robert Logan – synthesizers (tracks 1, 2, 6, 11), programming (6), "cut ups" (7)
- Sebastian Rochford – drum kit (tracks 1, 2, 8, 9), live drum machine (6)
- Robin Simon – reverse guitar (track 1), guitar (3)
- Charles Stuart – synthesizers (track 1)
- Ivor Guest – programming (tracks 1, 2, 6, 7), synthesizers (1, 6)
- Benge – modular synthesis (tracks 1, 2, 8, 11)
- Don-e Mclean – talk box (tracks 1, 6), stabs (7)
- Sarah Douglas – chatting (track 1)
- Leo Abrahams – acoustic guitar (track 3), guitars (8, 9), synthesizers (8), spinet (9, 10)
- Adam Blake – acoustic guitar (tracks 4, 10)
- Rachel Sermanni – chorus vocals (track 4)

Technical

- Ivor Guest – production, mixing, additional ProTools, additional engineering
- Matt Colton – mastering
- Cameron Craig – mixing (all tracks), engineering (tracks 1–3, 6–10)
- Benge – engineering (track 11); additional ProTools, additional engineering (all tracks)
- Dave Watson – additional ProTools, additional engineering
- James Watson – additional ProTools, additional engineering
- Leo Abrahams – additional ProTools, additional engineering
- Luke Glazewski – engineering assistance
- Kurt Uenala – computer engineering (tracks 1–3, 6–10)
- Samur Khouja – main vocal engineering, vocal sample engineering (track 7)

Visuals

- Drinkwater Studio – artwork
- Al Jackson – render

== Charts ==
Chart performance for The Art of the Lie
Chart (2024)	Peak position
Irish Albums (IRMA)	82
Scottish Albums (OCC)	5
UK Albums (OCC)	28
UK Independent Albums (OCC)	2
