= Murder of David Amess =

2021 murder in England

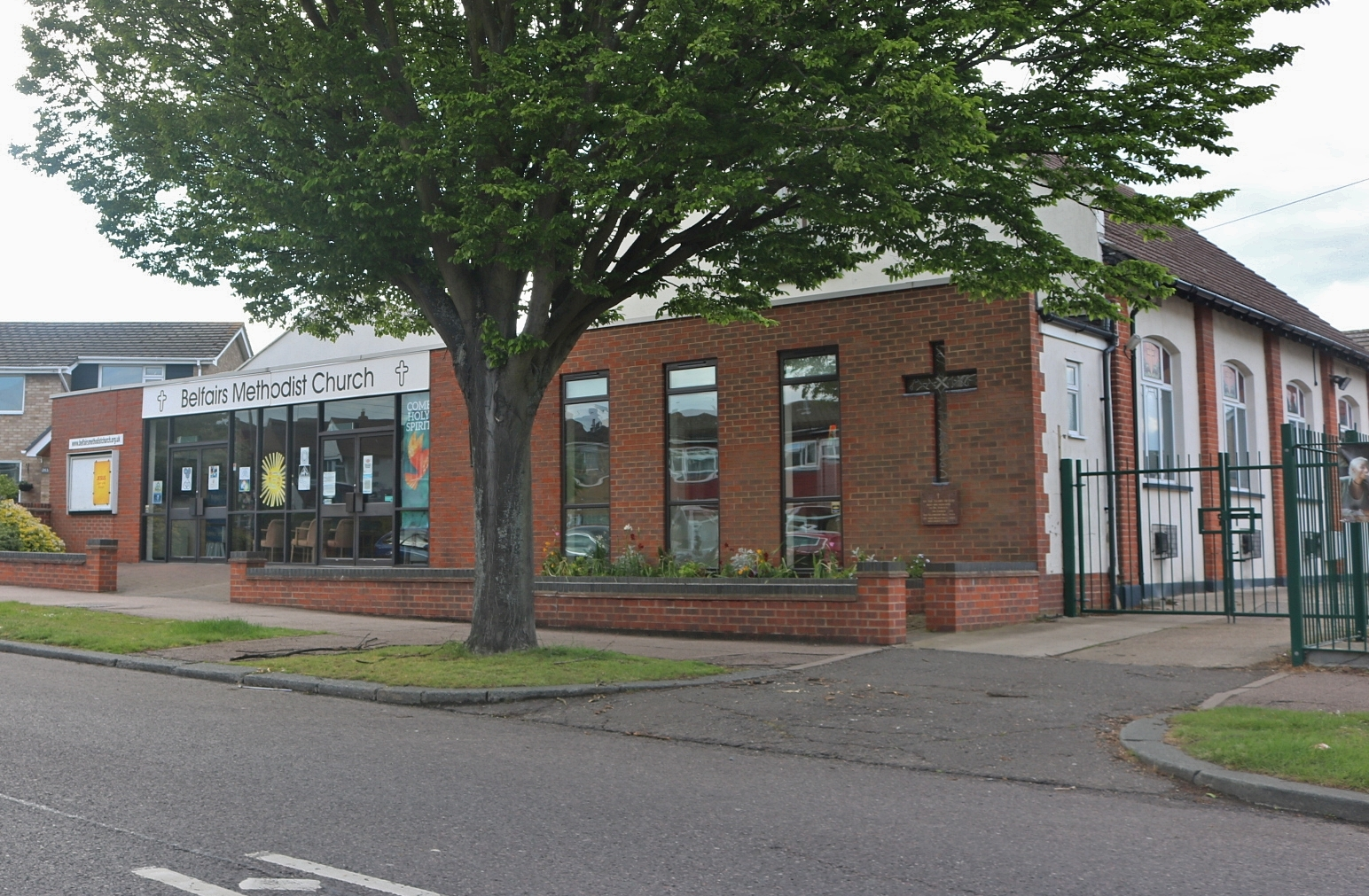
- Belfairs Methodist Church, May 2021
- Location: 51.5598°N 0.6507°E; Belfairs Methodist Church Hall; Leigh-on-Sea, Essex, England
- Date: 15 October 2021; 5 years ago c. 12:05 pm (BST)
- Attack type: Stabbing
- Deaths: David Amess
- Motive: Islamic extremism
- Charges: Murder; Preparation of terrorist acts
- Verdict: Guilty
- Sentence: Life imprisonment (whole life order)
- Convicted: Ali Harbi Ali

On 15 October 2021, David Amess, a British Conservative Party politician and Member of Parliament for Southend West, was fatally stabbed at a constituency surgery at Belfairs Methodist Church Hall in Leigh-on-Sea, Essex. His killer, Ali Harbi Ali, a British citizen and Islamic State sympathiser, was arrested at the scene. In April 2022, Ali was convicted of murder and the preparation of terrorist acts, and sentenced to life imprisonment with a whole life order.

== Background ==
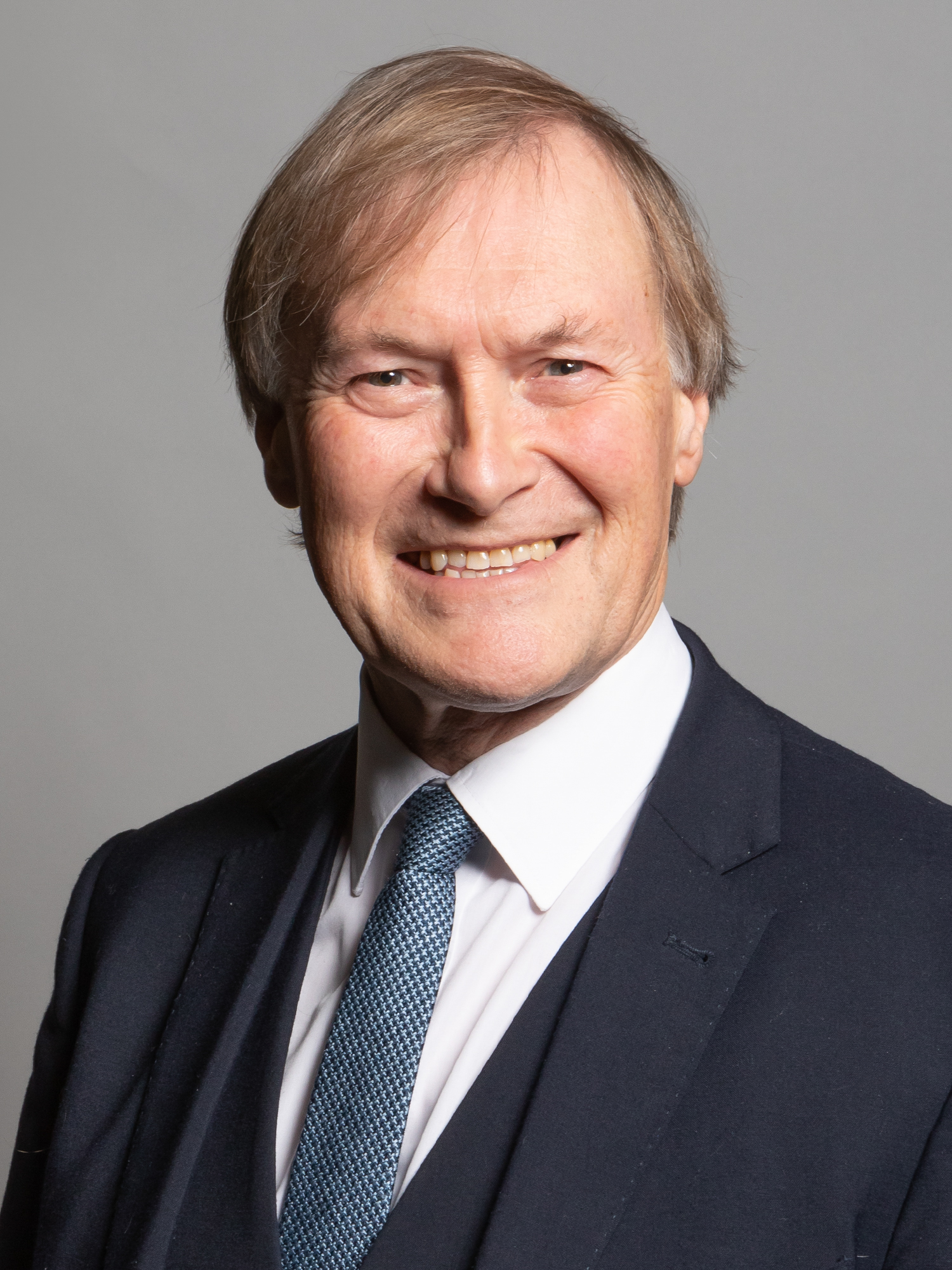
Amess in 2020

David Amess was a long-serving politician who entered Parliament in 1983 as MP for Basildon; at the time of his death, he was MP for Southend West. He held no senior positions during his career but was described by journalist Nick Paton Walsh as an "instantly recognisable" member of the Conservative Party, and was knighted for his political and public service in 2015. He was a devout Catholic and a socially conservative politician who opposed abortion, supported capital punishment, and campaigned in favour of Brexit. He was a supporter of animal welfare and supported a ban on fox hunting. He also supported a campaign to award city status to Southend-on-Sea, the main town of his constituency.

Amess's votes in favour of UK airstrikes in Syria as well as his membership with the Conservative Friends of Israel (CFI) were later cited by Ali as motives for his murder. Ali said during police interviews that he had been influenced by the propaganda of militant leader Abu Mohammad al-Adnani, who had called on Muslims to attack people in their home countries who were deemed to be enemies of the Islamic State (IS).

This was the second killing of an MP in the 21st century, following the murder in June 2016 of the Labour MP Jo Cox, while en route to a constituency surgery. Amess wrote in his 2020 autobiography that fears of similar attacks "rather spoilt the great British tradition of the people openly meeting their elected politicians", and that he had faced "nuisance from the odd member of the general public" and insecurity at his own home. MPs are protected by armed police within Parliament, with security tightened following the 2017 Westminster attack. They are generally not given police protection during surgeries, and are normally accompanied by only one member of staff. Following Cox's death, parliamentary spending on MPs' personal security rose from under £200,000 to £4.5 million in two years. Amess's murder was the second killing of a British MP in five years and prompted renewed calls for better security.

== Attack ==
On 15 October 2021, Amess held a constituency surgery at the church hall of Belfairs Methodist Church on Eastwood Road North in Leigh-on-Sea, Essex. He was scheduled to meet constituents from 10 am to 1 pm. He held a virtual meeting on Zoom with a colleague and talked to local residents on the steps of the hall before entering the building around 12:05 pm, accompanied by two female members of staff, to speak with people who had arrived earlier. While inside the church hall, a man armed with a knife emerged from a group of constituents and stabbed Amess multiple times.

Police and paramedics arrived at the scene within minutes. The suspect waited inside the church hall, where he was arrested and a police cordon was set up. An air ambulance landed at Belfairs Sports Ground to take Amess to hospital, but the medical team decided that his condition was not stable enough to transport him and so continued to work on him at the scene. His death was confirmed at 1:13 pm.

== Reactions ==
Following the attack, Prime Minister Boris Johnson returned to London, where flags were lowered to half-mast. Various parliamentary groups, and current and former politicians from across the political spectrum, expressed shock and offered condolences, as did members of the British royal family, international politicians, and relatives of Jo Cox. A vigil for Amess was held in his Southend West constituency at 6 pm on the day of his death, and another the next day.

Lindsay Hoyle, Speaker of the House of Commons, announced that the security of MPs would be reviewed. The safety of MPs during open, public constituency surgeries was debated by politicians. Calls to enact a law to crack down on online targeting of MPs and end anonymity were made. The Conservatives suspended political campaigning.

Ed Davey, the leader of the Liberal Democrats, paid tribute to Amess in a speech in the House of Commons.

A Catholic priest reported he was not allowed to enter the crime scene to administer the last rites. Labour MP Mike Kane sought to add an "Amess amendment" to the Police, Crime, Sentencing and Courts Act 2022 that would ensure Catholic priests are able to gain access to crime scenes in order to administer the last rites.

British Catholic policymakers issued statements affirming Amess's commitment to his faith and lauding his achievements. Sir Bill Cash, a colleague of many decades, referred to Amess as a "martyr for democracy" in the Catholic Herald.

On 16 October, Johnson and Leader of the Opposition Keir Starmer, accompanied by Hoyle and Home Secretary Priti Patel, laid wreaths at the church hall where Amess was killed. On 18 October, a minute's silence was held in the House of Commons before MPs paid tribute to Amess. That evening, a service of remembrance for Amess, attended by MPs, was held at St Margaret's, Westminster. The service included an address by the Archbishop of Canterbury, Justin Welby. MPs paid tribute in a book of condolence that was placed in the House of Commons Library, as well as in Westminster Hall and Portcullis House. Tributes were also laid at Belfairs Methodist Church, where Amess was killed.

In the days following Amess's death, a number of MPs, including the Conservative Chris Skidmore and Labour's Charlotte Nichols, voiced their support for a campaign to grant city status to Southend-on-Sea as a way of honouring Amess's memory; he had frequently spoken on the topic in Parliament. During tributes to Amess in the House of Commons on 18 October, Johnson announced that Queen Elizabeth II had consented to Southend being given city status. Southend officially became a city at a ceremony on 1 March 2022, with Charles, Prince of Wales, presenting letters patent from the Queen.

As a result of Amess's death, a by-election was triggered to fill his former seat. Major and minor parties announced they would not stand a candidate to oppose the Conservatives as a sign of respect, following the precedent set in the 2016 Batley and Spen by-election following the murder of Jo Cox. The Conservative candidate Anna Firth won the by-election on 3 February 2022.

Following the arrest of Ali, who is a British Somali, British Somalis reported being subject to abuse, harassment, and death threats. A statement was released by Zara Mohammed, the secretary general of the Muslim Council of Britain (MCB), who condemned the attacks and expressed shock on behalf of the Muslim community of Southend. "This is a heinous crime and we utterly condemn it," Mohammed said. "Nobody in the local Muslim community could believe how anybody could brutally murder anyone, never mind Sir David, who was so engaged with them." On 15 October, the MCB issued a formal statement re-affirming the importance of elected officials to be able to serve their communities without threats to their safety.

== Funeral ==
A procession and memorial service took place at St Mary's Church, the Anglican parish church in Prittlewell, on 22 November. A family statement was read by the former Conservative MP Ann Widdecombe. Afterwards, the casket was processed through the streets in a horse-drawn hearse. A Catholic funeral service was held at Westminster Cathedral on the following day. Johnson was joined by Hoyle, Starmer, and former prime ministers at the service. A message from Pope Francis was delivered by Archbishop Claudio Gugerotti, Apostolic Nuncio to Great Britain.

== Investigation ==
Mugshot of Ali Harbi Ali

Counter-terrorist police officers were involved in the early stages of the investigation. Essex Police said that a "25-year-old man was quickly arrested after officers arrived at the scene on suspicion of murder and a knife was recovered". Ali Harbi Ali, from Kentish Town, North London, was arrested at the scene.

When taken to Southend police station, Ali told the booking officer that he had committed "terror". When asked for his motive, he said "religious". In a police interview, he said "I mean, I guess yeah, I killed an MP. I done it, so yeah", then said he regretted that statement because it sounded like a Little Britain sketch. He said that Amess was suspicious of him and thought he was an undercover reporter. He said that he surrendered to the police "cos my sister was on the phone crying her eyes out".

At approximately 6:32 pm on 15 October, Essex Police announced that the investigation had been handed over to the Counter Terrorism Command of London's Metropolitan Police. On the evening of 16 October, the Metropolitan Police Service confirmed the suspect had been detained under Section 41 of the Terrorism Act 2000, and that magistrates had extended the period the suspect could be held in custody for questioning until 22 October. On 17 October, police identified the stabbing as a terrorist incident potentially motivated by Islamic extremism. Police searched three addresses in London over the weekend following the stabbing.

== Background of attacker ==
Ali Harbi Ali was born in Southwark, central London on 1 February 1996 to Somali parents. His father was a former communications adviser to the Prime Minister of Somalia and had worked on several anti-terrorist campaigns against a jihadist group. At the time of the attack, Ali was living with his aunt in a council house in Kentish Town.

In 2014, as a teenager, he was referred to Prevent, the United Kingdom's voluntary programme for those thought to be at risk of radicalisation, from which he was referred on to the Channel programme. He is believed not to have spent long in the programme, and he was not a "subject of interest" to MI5.

== Legal proceedings ==
On 21 October 2021, Ali was charged with the murder of Amess and the prior preparation of terrorist acts. On 22 October, he appeared at London's Old Bailey via video link from HM Prison Belmarsh, during which he was remanded in custody.

On 21 October 2021, a prosecutor told Westminster Magistrates' Court that Ali considered himself an affiliate of the Islamic State and that he had planned the attack two years in advance. The court also heard that his actions were "connected to the conflict in Syria".

On 27 October, an inquest was opened into Amess's death, but was immediately suspended "pending the outcome of the criminal proceedings". The coroner's office told the inquest that a post-mortem examination had confirmed that Amess had died from multiple stab wounds to the chest.

At a plea hearing on 21 December, Ali entered not guilty pleas for the charges of murder and preparing acts of terrorism. He was again remanded in custody.

The trial of Ali began on 21 March 2022, at the Old Bailey in London. Prosecutor Tom Little QC described the defendant as a "radicalised Islamist terrorist" and described the killing as a "murder carried out because of a warped and twisted and violent ideology". Little said the defendant had researched a list of "523 MPs who carried out a vote to carry out airstrikes in Syria", using the website TheyWorkForYou and had then carried out reconnaissance trips, including six visits to the address of Michael Gove in west London in 2021. Ali had researched other MPs, including Mike Freer and Sir Keir Starmer. Ali had visited Freer's constituency office on 17 September 2021, but he was not there as he was attending other meetings. In total, Ali researched over 250 MPs; Jess Phillips said that she was shocked that she was not informed that she was one of them until after Ali's conviction. On 11 April, Ali was found guilty of murder and the preparation of terrorist acts. He refused to stand up to receive the verdict, citing religious beliefs and saying he had "no regrets" in what he did. On 13 April, Mr Justice Sweeney sentenced Ali to life imprisonment with a whole life order, saying that the murder "struck at the heart of our democracy", and described Ali as a "cold, calculated and dangerous individual". Sweeney called Ali "cowardly" for his refusal to accept his guilt and put Amess's family through the ordeal of a trial. Ali reportedly smirked and winked at reporters as he was led away by custody officers. Amess' family said in a statement they felt "no elation" at the verdict, adding: "We shall never get over this tragedy."

== Legacy ==
The Conservative Member of Parliament Mark Francois proposed an amendment to the Online Safety Bill to prohibit online anonymity, which he called "David's Law". This was criticised as irrelevant by privacy campaigners, including Ruth Smeeth, who said "there is no evidence to suggest that there was any link between Sir David's death and online anonymity."

In March 2026, it was reported that the former Conservative Justice Secretary Robert Buckland will lead an independent review into state failings prior to the murder.

== See also ==
- Murder of Jo Cox
- List of prisoners with whole life orders
- Operation Bridger
- Ian Gow (1937–1990), MP for Eastbourne, assassinated by an IRA car bomb
