= Queen of Denmark (album) =

Studio album by John Grant
- Released: April 19, 2010
- Recorded: Denton, Texas; July–October 2008; May–July 2009
- Genres: Indie folk; soft rock
- Length: 51:16
- Label: Bella Union
- Producers: Paul Alexander; Eric Pulido; John Grant

John Grant chronology
| Queen of Denmark (2010) | Pale Green Ghosts (2013) |

Queen of Denmark is the debut solo album by American musician and former The Czars frontman John Grant, released via Bella Union on April 19, 2010. It is a collaboration between Grant and members of the American folk rock band Midlake, who had persuaded him to end his four-year hiatus from music following the break-up of The Czars.

== Production ==
The album was produced by Grant in collaboration with Midlake members Paul Alexander and Eric Pulido. It was recorded in Midlake's recording studio in Denton, Texas, over two four-month periods: first from July to October 2008 and then from May to July 2009.

During his performance at the 2016 edition of the T in the Park festival in Scotland, Grant revealed that he had written the album's title track while driving from Glasgow to Aberdeen.

== Reception ==
Professional ratings
Aggregate scores
| Source | Rating |
|---|---|
| AnyDecentMusic? | 8.0/10 |
| Metacritic | 75/100 |
Review scores
| Source | Rating |
| AllMusic | 2.5/5 stars |
| Financial Times | 4/5 stars |
| The Guardian | 4/5 stars |
| The Independent | 4/5 stars |
| The Irish Times | 3/5 stars |
| Mojo | 5/5 stars |
| NME | 8/10 |
| Q | 4/5 stars |
| The Sunday Times | 4/5 stars |
| Uncut | 4/5 stars |

In the May 2010 issue of Mojo, the album received the seldom-awarded "Instant Classic" label. Following Joanna Newsom's album Have One On Me, it is the second album to receive this honor since Fleet Foxes' self-titled debut in 2008. The reviewer wrote, "If Queen of Denmark were only comprised of self-lacerating ballads it would still be a work of transcendent beauty, but the second half of the album finds Grant confronting romantic loss with astonishing depth of feeling." In December, the magazine selected Queen of Denmark as its choice for the Best Album of 2010.

The BBC Music review website described the album as "one of the most deeply satisfying debut albums of recent times" and concluded, "Queen of Denmark transcends the sum of its influences by concentrating on the irresistible appeal of sad yet optimistic love songs, classy arrangements and a dark and handsome croon. Midlake's only mistake is making John Grant's startling debut better than their own records."

Mark Edwards wrote in The Sunday Times, "One listen to 'Where Dreams Go to Die', for example, and you'll realise that while Grant can't attain perfection in his actual life, he gets pretty close in his art."

The Guardian reviewer wrote, "After descending into a personal hell of booze, drugs and giving up music for waiting tables, the Coloradan [John Grant] has emerged with a colossus [...] Backed by superfans Midlake, these are songs of impossible love, near-suicide and redemption, with an air of vastness and contemplation recalling Dennis Wilson's masterpiece, Pacific Ocean Blue."

In The Independent, Andy Gill wrote of the album, "A near-perfect marriage of his warm baritone with their lush woodwind and keyboard textures, bring to tender life Grant's tales of growing up gay in the midwest."

The album was included in the book 1001 Albums You Must Hear Before You Die.

== Covers ==
Irish musician Sinéad O'Connor, who has featured on other Grant songs, covered the track "Queen of Denmark" on her 2012 album How About I Be Me (And You Be You)?

== Track listing ==
All tracks are written by John Grant.

| No. | Title | Length |
|---|---|---|
| 1. | "TC and Honeybear" | 5:04 |
| 2. | "Marz" | 3:56 |
| 3. | "Where Dreams Go to Die" | 6:02 |
| 4. | "Sigourney Weaver" | 3:29 |
| 5. | "Chicken Bones" | 3:36 |
| 6. | "Silver Platter Club" | 4:09 |
| 7. | "It's Easier" | 4:36 |
| 8. | "Outer Space" | 3:13 |
| 9. | "Jesus Hates Faggots" | 3:46 |
| 10. | "Caramel" | 3:33 |
| 11. | "Leopard & Lamb" | 4:39 |
| 12. | "Queen of Denmark" | 4:47 |
| Total length: | | 51:16 |

Limited Edition bonus disc
| No. | Title | Length |
|---|---|---|
| 1. | "That’s the Good News" | 4:12 |
| 2. | "Supernatural Defibrillator" | 2:51 |
| 3. | "Fireflies" | 3:41 |
| 4. | "What Time?" | 7:52 |
| Total length: | | 18:48 |

== Personnel ==
- John Grant – lead vocals, piano, keyboards, synthesizers

=== Midlake ===
- Eric Pulido – guitar, acoustic guitar
- Eric Nichelson – guitar, acoustic guitar
- Paul Alexander – bass, bassoon
- McKenzie Smith – drums
- Tim Smith – flute

=== Additional ===
- Jesse Chandler – piano
- Britt Herrington – keyboards, synthesizer
- Robert Gomez – guitar
- Bryan Van Divier – baritone guitar
- Fiona Brice – strings
- Buffi Jacobs – cello
- David Pierce – trombone
- Sara Lov – backing vocals (track 6)

== Certifications ==
| Region | Certification | Certified units/sales |
|---|---|---|
| United Kingdom (BPI) | Silver | 60,000^{‡} |
^{‡} Sales+streaming figures based on certification alone.
