= Goodbye (The Czars album) =

Album from The Czars

Studio album by The Czars
- Released: November 2, 2004
- Recorded: 2004
- Genre: pop rock
- Length: 54:08
- Label: Bella Union
- Producer: Colin Bricker, The Czars

The Czars chronology
The Ugly People Vs The Beautiful People (2001)	Goodbye (2004)	Sorry I Made You Cry (2005)

Goodbye is the fifth album by the American band The Czars, released in November 2004 on the Bella Union label. It was The Czars' last studio album of original material and was favourably reviewed by The Guardian, Mojo, Q, Uncut, AllMusic, and Pitchfork.

== Track listing ==
All tracks are written by The Czars.

No.	Title	Length
1.	"Goodbye (Intro)"	2.01
2.	"Goodbye"	4.24
3.	"Paint The Moon"	4.12
4.	"The Hymn"	4.45
5.	"My Love"	6.00
6.	"Little Pink House"	5.12
7.	"I Am The Man"	4.54
8.	"Trash"	3.37
9.	"I Saw A Ship"	3.27
10.	"Los"	5.42
11.	"Bright Black Eyes"	6.33
12.	"Pain"	3.21

== Personnel ==
- John Grant – lead vocals, piano, synthesisers
- Andy Monley – guitars
- Roger Green – guitar, synthesisers
- Chris Pearson – bass
- Jeff Linsenmaier – drums
