= The Czars =

American alternative rock band

- Origin: Denver, Colorado, US
- Genres: Slowcore, dream pop, alternative rock
- Years active: 1994–2006
- Labels: Bella Union (UK)
- Past members: John Grant; Chris Pearson; Jeff Linsenmaier; Andy Monley; Roger Green; Elin Palmer

The Czars were an American alternative rock band, formed in 1994 in Denver by John Grant and Chris Pearson. They released six studio albums, one EP, and three singles in the duration of their career. After the release of Goodbye in 2004, five of the six members of The Czars left the band over the span of nine months, leaving John Grant as the sole member of the band. After the exit of the other members, John Grant continued to tour under the name before deciding to pursue a solo career. Members Andy Monley and Roger Green, along with musician David Devine, appear on Sorry I Made You Cry as guitarists.

Following the band's breakup, Grant took some time off from the music business, and returned to recording and performing in 2010 with his debut solo album Queen of Denmark.

== History ==
Originally going by the name Titanic, The Czars was formed by Grant, Pearson, and Linsenmaier after Grant came back from a long stay in Germany in 1994. Prior to forming the band, John Grant aspired to be a translator in Germany before realizing that his English skills were poor and he would be unable to have the job he desired. The band went through a few personnel changes in its early stages, although Grant and Pearson were the stable members through this period. It took a few years before the official Czars' line-up was formed: John Grant on vocals and piano, Jeff Linsenmaier on drums, Andy Monley and Roger Green on guitar, and Chris Pearson on bass.

In 1996, the band's demos were released on the album Mood Swing through Pearson's record label, Velveteen Records. The following year, the album The La Brea Tar Pits of Routine was also released by Pearson's Velveteen Records. It has been noted by John Grant that he was dissatisfied with this album. Grant personally felt that the songs on the album weren't strong on a lyrical level and some of his vocals were out of tune. Both releases were produced by Bob Ferbrache and released by Chris Pearson on his label Velveteen Records. During this period of time, John Grant's lyrics were mostly improvised and he often added new words to his lyrics during live performances, making it difficult for Grant to ever do the same song twice.

The same year The Czars released The La Brea Tar Pits of Routine, Simon Raymonde, former bassist of the Cocteau Twins, formed the record label Bella Union. Chris Pearson, looking for label interest, used this as an opportunity to send the La Brea CD to the label. Raymonde was initially pleased with these efforts and saw potential in the band, but the tracks he received didn't impress him enough to immediately work with the band. This did not end the relationship between Raymonde and The Czars. Instead, it opened up a line of communication between the two and The Czars continued to create demos to send to Raymonde. In early 1997, the band recorded 4 new songs with local engineer Bob Ferbrache in Denver as demos for the label. The demos that were sent after the initial disc impressed Raymonde and the band was invited to start an album on the Bella Union label.

With the help of Simon Raymonde as the producer, the Czars began to work on their new album, Before...But Longer in London. Simon did not request a certain sound for the band and allowed them to create and work on their own sound at their own pace. Grant's long writing process as a songwriter caused a lot of the music to be recorded before any lyrics were attached to the song. Most of Grant's songwriting for this album took place near paths by the Thames in Twickenham and Richmond on park benches. He decided to abandon his previous form of songwriting, which mostly relied on improvisation, and started to write lyrics that were more set in stone. Grant said the following about his writing process for the album: "I used to think it was cool to improvise like that but not anymore. For example, Val, the single from the album, I had different lyrics for that one every time. And when I finally got lyrics that were set in stone it was the first time I was really able to enjoy the song and really sing it with feeling. That's another thing, you can't really sing anything with conviction if it's improvised every time because it's always different."

The recording of Before...But Longer took place in 1998 and the album was finished in September. With no team in place, no agent, no European licensee, no live show, Raymonde then spent a year trying to drum up interest for the band in the musical community to enable him to launch the band. Upon the actual release of the album in 2000, the band had already considered the material to be old, and didn't seem that keen to promote it, but despite this, the album was received decently. Drowned in Sound gave the album 8/10.

In 2000 the band began to work on 'The Ugly People vs The Beautiful People' with Simon Raymonde providing his production services gratis once again, leaving his young family back in London while he and The Czars battled their way through the new songs in snowy Denver. Engineering on the album was provided by Colin Bricker at Mighty Fine Audio in Denver. The Czars also appeared on the compilation album, Sing a Song for You: A Tribute to Tim Buckley after being asked to cover "Song to the Siren" and were also asked to compose the soundtrack for the independent film I'd Rather Be... Gone.

The EP, X Would Rather Listen to Y Than Suffer Through a C of Z's was self-produced by the band with Colin Bricker and released during the 2002 tour. The name of the EP is a joke and came from a dictionary. John Grant has said the following about the meaning of the title: "It's just a joke about how people use calculated formulas with people when they go out into the world to deal with people and how that simply doesn't work."

Violinist Elin Palmer joined the band in 2003 and contributed to the album, Goodbye, which was also produced and engineered by Colin Bricker at Mighty Fine Audio in Denver. Having sunk several thousand dollars into the band over the course of the two previous albums, and with the band facing a large unrecouped balance, the label decided to hold off on picking up the next option. The band received help from friends and within a year or so had made the album Goodbye, which Grant has stated is his favorite Czars album.

Despite Goodbye's critical acclaim, it was the final album made by the band. Roger Green quit the band on November 22, 2004. The next day, Grant unceremoniously fired Pearson via e-mail, even though they had co-founded the band 10 years before. Overall, five out of the six members decided to part ways over a span of nine months in 2004, resulting in John Grant being the only member. Grant continued to perform live with the moniker until finally deciding to part with the name. In 2005, Bella Union released a compilation of b-sides and rarities by the band, titled Sorry I Made You Cry.

Best Of compilation album came out on December 1, 2014, on Bella Union.

== Discography ==
=== Studio albums ===
- Moodswing – 1995
- The La Brea Tar Pits of Routine – 1997
- Before... But Longer – 2000
- The Ugly People vs the Beautiful People – 2001
- X Would Rather Listen to Y Than Suffer Through a C of Z's (Tour EP) – 2002
- Goodbye – 2004
- Sorry I Made You Cry – 2006
- Best Of – 2014

=== Singles ===
- "Val" – 2000
- "Side Effect" – 2002
- "X Would Rather Listen" – 2002
- "Paint the Moon" – 2004
