= The Ugly People vs the Beautiful People =

The Ugly People Vs The Beautiful People

Studio album by The Czars
- Released: October 16, 2001
- Recorded: February 2001
- Studio: NFA Studios, Denver, Colorado
- Genre: pop rock
- Length: 60:29
- Label: Bella Union
- Producer: Giles Hall, Simon Raymonde

The Czars chronology
Before...But Longer (2000)	The Ugly People Vs The Beautiful People (2001)	Goodbye (2004)

The Ugly People Vs The Beautiful People is the fourth album by the American band The Czars, released on October 16, 2001, on the Bella Union label. It was recorded in Denver, Colorado in the winter of 2001.

== Track listing ==
All lyrics are written by John Grant; all music is composed by The Czars.

The Ugly People vs the Beautiful People track listing
No.	Title	Length
1.	"Drug"	4:10
2.	"Side Effect"	4:55
3.	"Killjoy"	5:40
4.	"Caterpillar"	6:42
5.	"Lullaby 6000"	5:35
6.	"This"	3:28
7.	"Autumn"	7:05
8.	"Black and Blue"	4:26
9.	"Anger"	4:06
10.	"Roger's Song"	5:15
11.	"What Used to Be Human"	4:52
12.	"Catherine"	4:15

== Personnel ==
- John Grant – lead vocals, piano
- Roger Green – guitar
- Jeff Linsenmaier – drums, backing vocals
- Andy Monley – guitar, backing vocals
- Chris Pearson – bass
