= Grey Tickles, Black Pressure =

Studio album by John Grant
- Released: October 9, 2015
- Recorded: 2014–2015
- Genre: Soft rock; electronic rock; synth-pop; new wave
- Length: 57:23
- Label: Bella Union
- Producer: John Congleton; John Grant

John Grant chronology
Pale Green Ghosts (2013)	Grey Tickles, Black Pressure (2015)	Love Is Magic (2018)

Grey Tickles, Black Pressure is the third solo album by American musician John Grant. It was released via Bella Union on October 9, 2015.

== Production ==
The album's title stems from the literal translation of two foreign phrases: "grey tickles" is an Icelandic phrase for approaching middle age, while "black pressure" is the Turkish term for a nightmare. Grant stated that he wanted to get "angrier and moodier" on the album, although he enjoyed the process of making it more than his previous two.

The album's trailer features Grant in the midst of a psychotic break, covered in blood and wielding a croquet mallet as a weapon. He described it as a fantasy of "what [he] would like to do every time somebody calls [him] a faggot". The album features three guests: English singer Tracey Thorn features on the track "Disappointing", American singer Amanda Palmer provides backing vocals on "You & Him", and English drummer Budgie plays the drums on every track. The latter would also go on tour as Grant's drummer.

== Reception ==
Professional ratings
Aggregate scores
Source	Rating
AnyDecentMusic?	8.1/10
Metacritic	82/100
Review scores
Source	Rating
AllMusic	4/5 stars
The Guardian	4/5 stars
The Independent	5/5 stars
The Irish Times	4/5 stars
Mojo	4/5 stars
The Observer	4/5 stars
Q	4/5 stars
Record Collector	3/5 stars
Rolling Stone	3.5/5 stars
Uncut	8/10

The album received acclaim. NME named it "one of the albums of the year" and praised both its personal lyrics and pop melodies. On their own lists of the best albums of the year, The Guardian and Rough Trade respectively placed it at No. 38 and No. 11. Time named the 11th track on the album, "Disappointing", as the fifth best song of 2015.

== Accolades ==
Accolades for Grey Tickles, Black Pressure
Publication	Accolade	Rank
The Guardian	The Best Albums of 2015	38
Rough Trade	Albums of the Year 2015	11

== Track listing ==
All tracks are written by John Grant.

Grey Tickles, Black Pressure track listing
No.	Title	Length
1.	"Intro"	1:36
2.	"Grey Tickles, Black Pressure"	5:30
3.	"Snug Slacks"	4:11
4.	"Guess How I Know"	3:34
5.	"You & Him"	3:26
6.	"Down Here"	4:09
7.	"Voodoo Doll"	3:07
8.	"Global Warming"	4:04
9.	"Magma Arrives"	5:02
10.	"Black Blizzard"	4:48
11.	"Disappointing"	4:56
12.	"No More Tangles"	6:09
13.	"Geraldine"	6:22
14.	"Outro"	0:30

== Personnel ==
Primary musicians

- John Grant – lead vocals, keyboards, synth programming and sequencing
- Pétur Hallgrímsson – guitar
- Jakob Smári Magnússon – bass
- Budgie – drums

Additional musicians

- Amanda Palmer – additional vocals (track 5)
- Tracey Thorn – additional vocals (track 11)
- Fiona Brice – additional vocals, string, brass and vocal arrangements (written and conducted by), violin
- Tierannye Sparks – additional vocals
- Alisa Alexander – additional vocals
- Bobby Sparks – keyboards
- John Congleton – synth programming and sequencing, drum programming and sequencing
- David Monsch – bass clarinet
- Matt Milewski – violin
- Natalie Floyd – violin
- Sarah Carmichael – violin
- Buffi Jacobs – cello
- Debbie Brooks – cello
- Keith Jourdan – trumpet
- Peter Clagett – trumpet
- David Pierce – trombone
- Carl Murr – trombone
- Simon Willats – tuba
- Heather Test – French horn
- Wes Baggaley – spoken word (track 1)
- Olafur Darri Olafsson – spoken word (track 1)
- Petra Hallberg – spoken word (track 1)
- Jeppe Kjellberg – spoken word (track 1)
- Billy Novik – spoken word (track 1)
- Karl Neukauf – spoken word (track 1)
- Carys Connolly – spoken word (track 14)

== Charts ==
Chart performance for Grey Tickles, Black Pressure
Chart (2015)	Peak position
Belgian Albums (Ultratop Flanders)	46
Belgian Albums (Ultratop Wallonia)	87
Dutch Albums (Album Top 100)	34
French Albums (SNEP)	122
Irish Albums (IRMA)	3
Italian Albums (FIMI)	99
New Zealand Albums (Recorded Music NZ)	27
Norwegian Albums (VG-lista)	21
UK Albums (OCC)	5
US Top Heatseekers Albums (Billboard)	20
Scottish Albums (OCC)	2
