= Meco Plays The Wizard of Oz =

Studio album by Meco
- Released: 1978
- Genres: Disco, tribute album, novelty, instrumental pop
- Length: 17:53
- Labels: Millennium; RCA
- Producers: Meco, Tony Bongiovi, Harold Wheeler

Meco chronology
Encounters of Every Kind (1978)	Meco Plays The Wizard of Oz (1978)	Superman & Other Galactic Heroes (1978)

Professional ratings
Review scores
Source	Rating
AllMusic	4/5 stars

Meco Plays The Wizard of Oz is an album by the American musician Meco, released in 1978. The album sold around 400,000 copies.

== Track listing ==
1. "Over the Rainbow" (Harold Arlen, E.Y. "Yip" Harburg) - (1:58)
2. "Cyclone" (George Bassman, Herbert Stohart, George Stoll) - (3:43)
3. "Munchkinland" - (1:19)
4. "Ding-Dong! The Witch Is Dead" (Harold Arlen, E.Y. "Yip" Harburg) - (2:00)
5. "We're Off to See the Wizard" (Harold Arlen, E.Y. "Yip" Harburg) - (3:32)
6. "Poppies"
7. "The Spell"
8. "Optimistic Voices"
9. "The Merry Old Land of Oz"
10. "The Haunted Forest" (Harold Arlen, E.Y. "Yip" Harburg) - (1:22)
11. "March of the Winkies" (Herbert Stohart) - (1:20)
12. "Dorothy's Rescue" (Herbert Stohart) - (1:11)
13. "If I Were King of the Forest" (Harold Arlen, E.Y. "Yip" Harburg) - (0:57)
14. "Over the Rainbow"
15. "The Reprise: Delirious Escape/Over the Rainbow/Ding-Dong! The Witch Is Dead/Munchkinland" (Harold Arlen, E.Y. "Yip" Harburg) - (3:17)

== Charts ==
=== Album ===
Title	Release date	Chart positions		
Title	Release date	US Pop	US R&B	AUS
"The Wizard Of Oz"	1978	#68	#49	#72

=== Singles ===
Year	Single	Chart Positions			
Year	Single	US R&B	US Dance	US Pop	AUS
1978	"The Wizard Of Oz"	-	#35	#35	#72

== See also ==
- The Wizard of Oz, 1939 film
