= Theme from Close Encounters =

"Theme from Close Encounters" may refer to:

- "Theme from Close Encounters of the Third Kind", a 1977 instrumental hit by John Williams, #13 on the U.S. Billboard Hot 100
- "Theme from Close Encounters", a 1978 instrumental hit by Meco, #25 on the U.S. Billboard Hot 100
