= Suzanne Ciani =

American musician (born 1946)

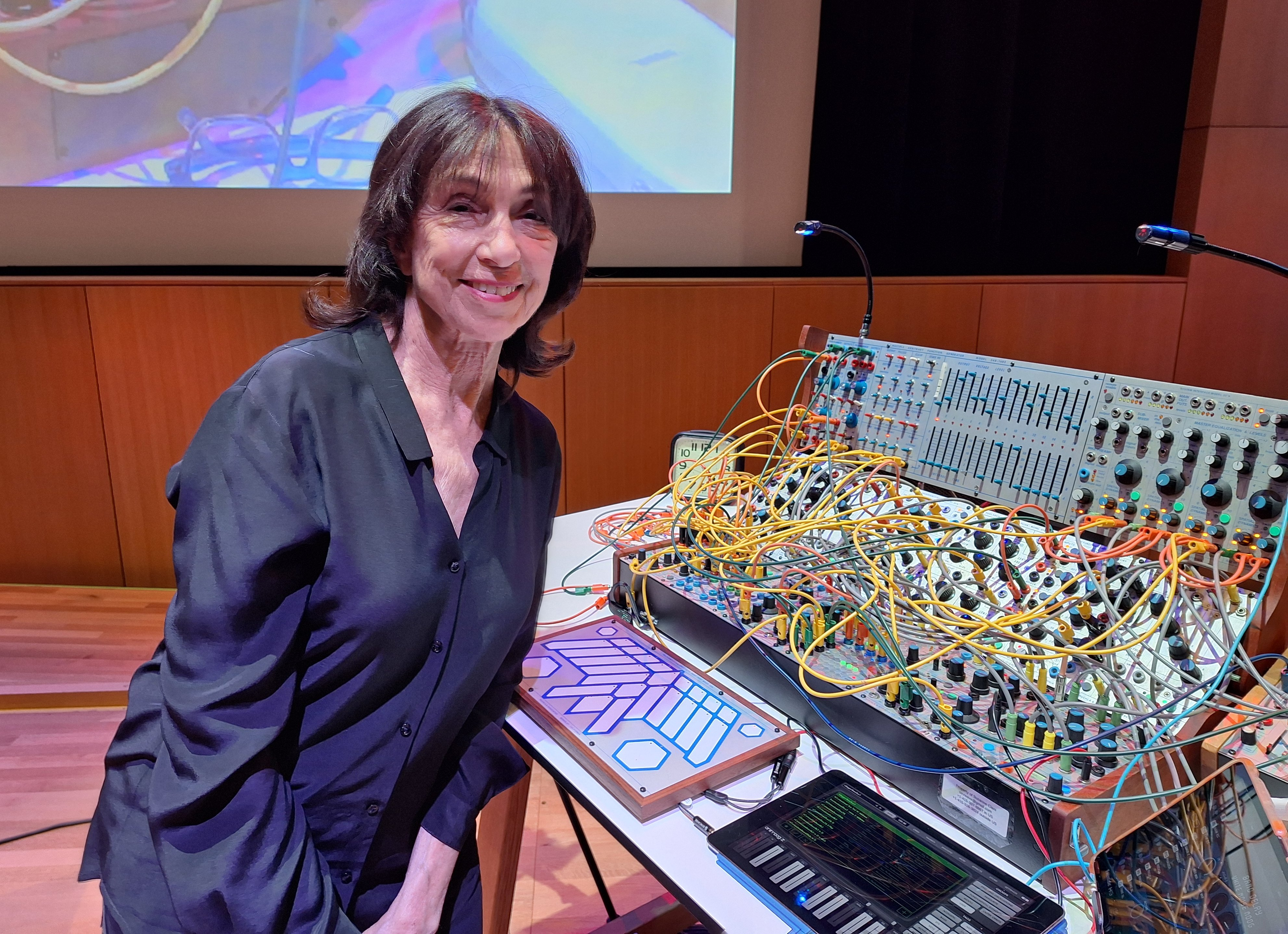
- Ciani in 2024

Background information
- Born: June 4, 1946 (age 80); Indiana, U.S.
- Genres: Electronic; New age; avant-garde; ambient music
- Occupations: Musician; composer; sound designer; record label executive
- Instruments: Synthesizer; keyboards; piano
- Years active: 1969–present
- Labels: Finnadar; RCA; Private Music; Seventh Wave
- Website: www.sevwave.com

Suzanne Ciani (/tʃiːˈɑːniː/; born June 4, 1946) is an American musician, sound designer, composer, and record label executive who found early success in the 1970s, with her electronic music and sound effects for films and television commercials. Her career has included works with quadraphonic sound. She has been nominated for a Grammy Award for Best New Age Album five times. Her success with electronic music has her dubbed "Diva of the Diode" and "America's first female synth hero".

== Early life ==
Ciani was born in an army hospital in Indiana. She was raised in Quincy, Massachusetts, a southern suburb of Boston. She has four sisters and Italian roots. Her father was a physician, and she started to play the piano at age six.

From 1964 to 1968, Ciani studied traditional liberal arts at Wellesley College in nearby Wellesley where she received classical music training. She also took evening classes, one of which was at the Massachusetts Institute of Technology which is where she first learned about music technology. One artist she cites as a big influence is German photographer Ilse Bing, who provided lyrics and drawings to her track "Lumière", along with classical music composers and pianist Glenn Gould.

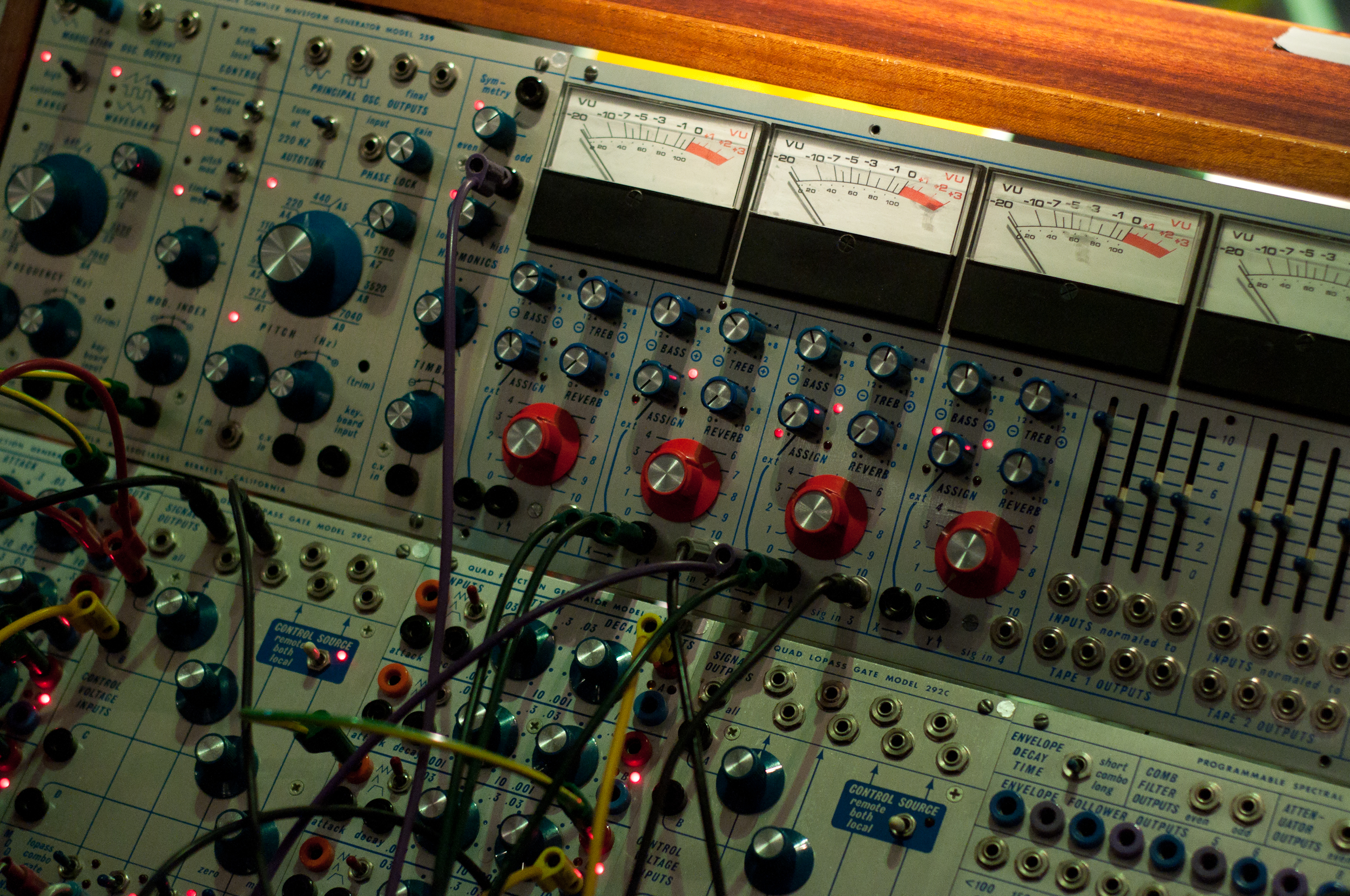
A Buchla 200 modular synthesizer

Ciani studied for a master's degree in composition at University of California, Berkeley, from 1968 to 1970. In her first year, she met synthesizer inventor and pioneer Don Buchla through her boyfriend at the time, and became highly influenced by his analog modular synthesizer, the Buchla, then a competitor of the Moog synthesizer by Bob Moog. Ciani became a devotee, working for Buchla. "I call Don the Leonardo DaVinci of instrument design." She spent time with a Buchla synthesizer in a rented studio at the tape music center at Mills College in Oakland, paying $5 for each visit. She took a summer course in computer music at Stanford University where she was taught by Max Mathews, John Chowning, and Leland Smith at the Artificial Intelligence Lab.

After graduating from Berkeley, Ciani took up work at Buchla and Associates to earn enough money for a Buchla synthesizer of her own, the Buchla 200. There she "Sat and soldered joints and drilled holes for three dollars an hour. When the synthesizers were finished, tested and shipped off, I felt as though I were losing children". In a 2019 interview with Michelle Macklem for a feature about her in the KCRW podcast series Lost Notes, Ciani recounted that she and several other employees were keen to learn more about using the synthesizer, so she approached Don Buchla and asked if he would conduct tutorial sessions for them. Buchla initially agreed, but at the end of the first class he took Ciani aside and declared "We've decided that we don't want women in the class," to which the horrified Ciani retorted, "But I'm the only woman in the class!"

Her first paid job in composing was in 1969, producing for 10 Macy's Christmas advertisements. Around this time she worked on sound installations at galleries, exhibitions, and dance performances, composed at San Francisco Tape Music Center, which was housed at Mills College, composed for films, and recorded experimental pieces in her garage studio. Ciani also started a furniture company but ceased after six months as the result of two "unsaleable" designs, theft, fire, and vandalism. She realized that she was not doing what she liked and decided to make her living at music. She first recorded an album marrying classical and electronic experimentation in 1969, "Flower of Evil," but it was shelved until 2019. Her first release, in 1970, was the album Voices of Packaged Souls (1970), a collaboration with sculptor Harold Paris, put together using musique concrète techniques at radio station KPFA in Berkeley during the night shift. Fifty copies were pressed, initially.

== Career ==
=== 1970s ===
In April 1974, Ciani began a nineteen-year stay in New York City, travelling only with clothes and her Buchla synthesizer. Among her first activities was a solo performance at the Bonino Gallery in conjunction with the opening of a Ronald Mallory exhibition. Ciani became a session musician, but soon struggled to maintain a steady income. She once accepted a concert performance at the Lincoln Center in Manhattan, but when she was denied a four-speaker quadraphonic sound setup, she refused to perform. She also spent three years on the venue's renovation, but "that didn't work". At a solo show in April 1975, Ciani learned that Vladimir Ussachevsky had attended and recommended her to a grant. She later wrote that she was "homeless and happy" at this time and moved from the loft of art critic Robert Hughes to the floor of Philip Glass's basement recording studio. By 1976, Ciani had secured a National Endowment for the Arts grant.

In 1978 Ciani founded Ciani/Musica. Inc. to produce jingles for advertisements for companies such as Coca-Cola, Merrill Lynch, AT&T and General Electric. She enjoyed the opportunity to work for such companies and enjoyed the creative freedom because few people understood what the Buchla could do as it lacked a keyboard. The sound of a bottle of Coca-Cola being opened and poured was one of Ciani's most widely recognized works and was used in radio and television commercials in the late 1970s. She is also responsible for "logo" sounds pertaining to Energizer and ABC. Such was the demand for her services, that at one point she was doing up to 10 sessions a week.

Ciani performed as a guest artist on various albums from 1976. The first was the same-titled album by the Starland Vocal Band, including the "swoosh" sound to "Afternoon Delight". At the time, Ciani thought the work was just a "song about spaceships". In the following year, Ciani provided sound effects for Star Wars and Other Galactic Funk, a disco version of the Star Wars Episode IV: A New Hope soundtrack by Meco. Ciani scored Lloyd Williams's 1975 experimental film Rainbow's Children, and for a 1986 documentary about Mother Teresa. She also composed the 1976 Columbia Pictures and Columbia Pictures Television logo themes.

In 1979, Ciani was commissioned to provide sounds to the pinball machine game Xenon, which featured her own voice fed through a vocoder. This marked the first female voice heard in a pinball game and Ciani had never played pinball before the project arose. In 2013, she was inducted into The Pinball Expo Hall of Fame for her work on the game. Ciani then sampled her voice onto a sound chip with the aim of selling it for use in other applications, including elevator announcements. The US federal government approached her to design sounds for flight simulators.

=== 1980s ===
In 1980, Ciani demonstrated several of her sound effects on national television with an appearance on The David Letterman Show. The producers agreed for her to perform her own music with the show's house band, but they cut to a commercial break when they started to play. That same year, she also appeared on the PBS children's TV show 3-2-1 Contact demonstrating her synthesizer. Ciani's television work in the 1980s included an Atari commercial and work on a proposed "negative vocoder" with Harald Bode, but development ceased following Bode's death in 1987.

Ciani scored the soundtrack to Lily Tomlin's film The Incredible Shrinking Woman, which marked the first solo female composer of a Hollywood film.

In 1982, Ciani released her first studio album characterized by electronic and new-age music. She later said that making albums was something that she had always wanted to do, calling it "my destiny". She started on her first, Seven Waves, in 1979 which saw an initial Japanese only release. Ciani reasoned this to the difficulty American record labels had in selling an electronic album by a female artist that lacked vocals. In 1984, it was released in the US by Atlantic Records, thanks to Ilhan Mimaroglu who was an executive at the Finnadar label. The album was produced using an MC-8 and MC-4 sequencer, a Prophet 5 synthesizer, a Roland TR-808 drum machine, the Buchla 200, Bode Vocoder, Lyricon, Synclavier, Polymoog, and Arp and Eventide Processing.

In 1985, Ciani received a Bronze Lion award at the Cannes Lions International Festival of Creativity.

Ciani's 1986 album The Velocity of Love, released by RCA Records, features the title track which became her best known song. It marks her first piano recordings for many years since focusing her work on the Buchla.

In July and August 1987, Ciani performed her first live solo concerts in 15 years.

=== 1990s ===
Although emphasizing electronic music in her recordings, her solo piano album Pianissimo, from 1990, became her best-selling album. Ciani ended her contract with Private Music with the compilation The Private Music of Suzanne Ciani, in 1992.

In 1991, Ciani released Hotel Luna, the music for which was inspired by her travels to Italy to learn more about her Italian ancestry.

In 1992, the soap opera One Life to Live introduced a new theme song written and performed by Ciani, who also did scoring for several episodes of the show.

In 1994, Ciani founded her own independent record label, Seventh Wave. Her husband became the label's president. All of her subsequent albums have been released on the label.

Her 1994 album Dream Suite was recorded in Moscow with the Young Russia Orchestra, and was Grammy-nominated. 1999's Turning featured her first composition with lyrics, in the title track, sung by Taiwanese artist Chyi Yu.

=== 2000s–present ===
In early 2006, Ciani's Silver Ship won in the 5th Annual Independent Music Awards for Best New Age Album. Ciani was also an inaugural member of the Independent Music Awards' judging panel to support independent artists.

Ciani performed in a new-age jazz group, the Wave.

In February 2015, Ciani received an Achievement Award from the Wellesley Alumnae Association, one of three women honored that night.

In 2016, Ciani released Buchla Concerts 1975, formed of two live performances in New York City in April 1975. She was asked to release some archived material and remarked, "All of a sudden I was in the public eye with the electronics again! I wasn't aware at all about what was going on; it felt strange. [...] There was this whole renaissance going on when I came out". Buchla then convinced Ciani to purchase a synthesizer from him following his decision to sell his company, but she left it for a year before she started to use it.

In 2016, Ciani released Sunergy, a collaboration using Buchla synthesizers with the musician Kaitlyn Aurelia Smith, as part of the RVNG Intl. FRKWYS Series.

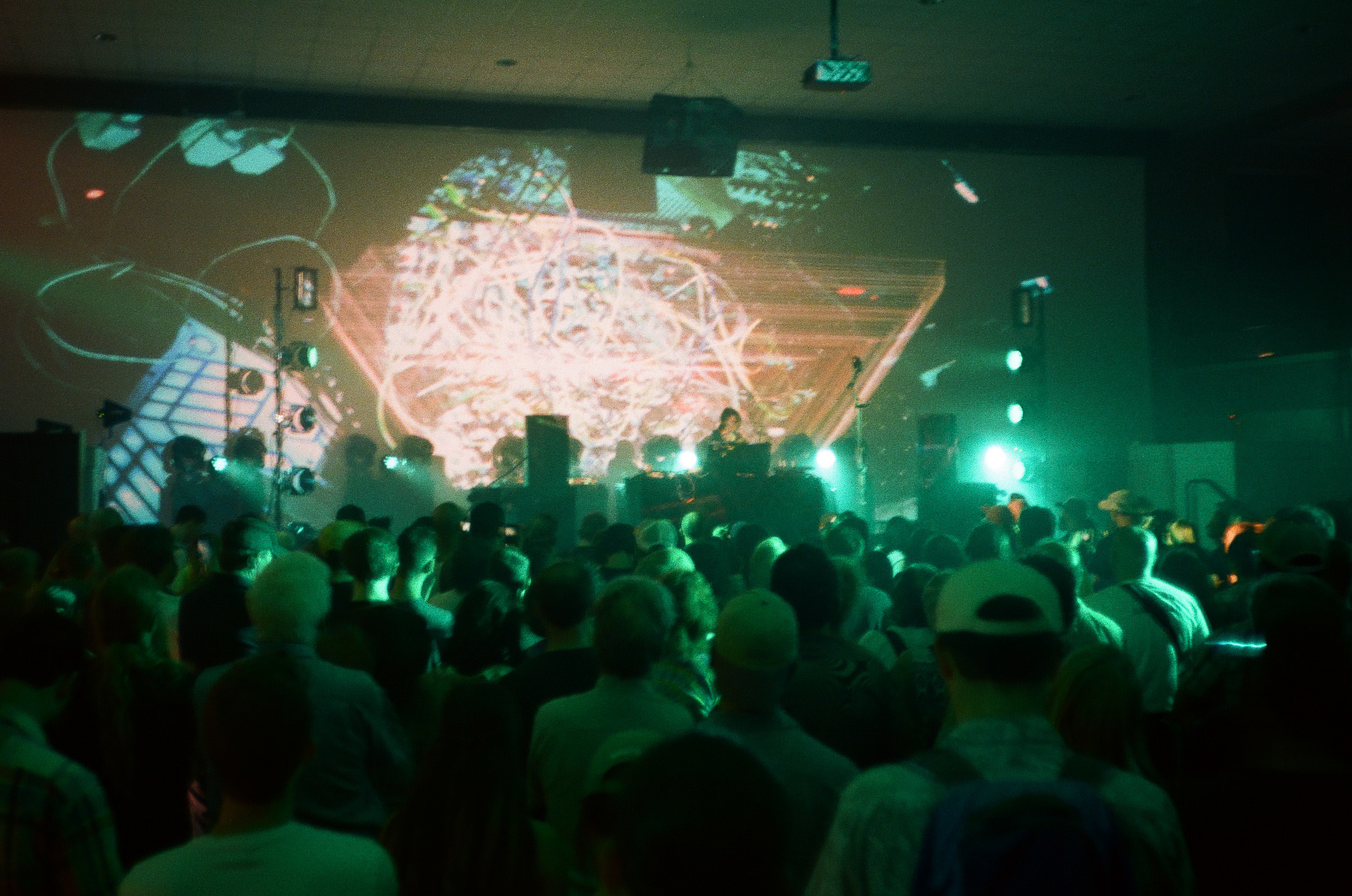
Ciani performing in 2017

In May 2017, Ciani became the first woman to receive a Moog Music Innovation Award at the annual electronic festival Moogfest.

In June 2018, Ciani released Live Quadraphonic, a live album documenting her first solo performance on a Buchla synthesizer in 40 years. The show took place at Gray Area in San Francisco on March 5, 2016, presented in four channel quadraphonic sound. A recording of this performance was one of the first quadraphonic LP vinyl releases in over 30 years and used an encoding process based on the QS Regular Matrix system. Inspired by the Buchla 227 quad output module, the $227 release was a very limited edition of only 227 numbered, 45 rpm, 180g quadraphonic vinyl discs sold. The box also included an enamel pin based on the album cover, plus a custom quadraphonic hardware decoder made in collaboration with Involve Audio to decode two channels of audio from the vinyl disc back to the four-channel recording.

In June 2019, Finders Keepers Records released an unrealized album project by Ciani that she recorded in 1969 titled Flowers of Evil. It features a recital of Élévation by French poet Charles Baudelaire, with Ciani performing on a Buchla synthesizer.

In 2023, Ciani released Improvisation on Four Sequences, a live recording of her Buchla performance at the 2022 Rewire Festival in The Hague. The album features spontaneous modular synthesis across four channels and was praised for its "radiant clarity and interdimensional drift," reaffirming Ciani’s central role in the evolution of spatial electronic music.

In 2024, Ciani collaborated with immersive event series Age of Reflections to present her Particles & Waves Tour. For the first time since its 1984 release, Ciani performed her Seven Waves album, paired with Reflections’ projection-mapped visuals in a tour of cathedrals.

== Personal life ==
In 1992, Ciani was diagnosed with early-stage breast cancer from which she recovered after radiation treatments and surgery. The news prompted her relocation from New York City to California and she has resided in the coastal community of Bolinas since.

From 1994 to 2000, Ciani was married to producer and entertainment attorney Joseph Anderson. The marriage ended in divorce.

== Awards and honors ==
- EMEAPP Lifetime Achievement Award, 2024
- Milley Award for Musical Arts, 2023
- SEAMUS Award, 2023
- Herb Alpert Visiting Professorship, 2022-2023
- Golden Ear Award, 2022
- A2IM Independent Icon Award, 2020
- Moog Innovation Award, 2017
- Pinball Expo Hall of Fame, 2013
- Keyboard Magazine's Hall of Fame, 2012
- Nominee, Grammy Award for Best New Age Album: Neverland (1988), Hotel Luna (1991), Dream Suite (1996), Pianissimo II (1997), Turning (2000)
- Best New Age Keyboardist, Keyboard magazine, 1992
- Lifetime Achievement Award (Granny), Women in Audio Section of the Audio and Engineering Society, 1997
- Winner, American Federation of Independent Music (Indie), Silver Ship, 2006
- Most Valuable Synthesizer Player Award, National Academy of Recording Arts and Sciences, 1987
- Clio Awards, Excellence in Advertising, 1977–1989
- Bronze Lion Award for Excellence in Advertising, International Advertising Film Festival, 1985

== Discography ==
=== Solo ===
Studio albums

- Voices of Packaged Souls (1970)
- Seven Waves (1982)
- The Velocity of Love (1986)
- Neverland (1988)
- History of My Heart (1989)
- Pianissimo (1990)
- Hotel Luna (1991)
- Dream Suite (1994)
- Pianissimo II (1996)
- Turning (1999)
- Pianissimo III (2001)
- Silver Ship (2005)
- Logo Presentation Reels 1985 (2012)
- "Help, Help, The Globolinks!" (2017)
- Flowers of Evil (2019)
- Music for Denali (2020)
- Golden Apples of the Sun (with Jonathan Fitoussi) (2023)

Live albums

- Suzanne Ciani and The Wave Live! (1997)
- Logo Presentation Reels 1985 (2012)
- Buchla Concerts 1975 (2016)
- LIVE Quadraphonic (2018)
- Live Buchla at Machines in Music (2018)
- A Sonic Womb: Live Buchla performance at Lapsus (2020)
- Improvisation on Four Sequences at Festival Antigel (2021)
- Improvisation on Four Sequences Live at Week-End Fest (2023)
- Buchla Concert At Galeria Bonino New York April 1974 (2024)
- Live At Villa Lontana (2025)
- Concrète Waves (with Actress) (2026)
- CIANI/ORKEST (with Metropole Orkest & Simon Dobson) (2026)

Compilations

- The Private Music of Suzanne Ciani (1992)
- Meditations for Dreams, Relaxation, and Sleep (2002)
- Pure Romance (2003)
- Lixiviation (Ciani/Musica Inc. 1969–1985) (2012)
- A Life in Waves (2020)

=== Appearances ===
- Starland Vocal Band – Starland Vocal Band (1976)
- Philippé Wynne – Starting All Over (1977)
- Elliott Randall – Elliott Randall's New York (1977)
- Meco – Star Wars and Other Galactic Funk (1977)
- Art Farmer and Joe Henderson – Yama (1979)
- Cindy & Roy – Feel It (1979)
- Spyro Gyra – Morning Dance (1979)
- Alien – Sons of the Universe (1979)
- Yusef Lateef – In a Temple Garden (1979)
- Steve Hackett – Spectral Mornings (1979)
- Fuse One – Fuse One (1980)
- Mike Rutherford – Smallcreep's Day (1980)
- Goldstar – The Future Is Now (1980)
- Various – Fame: The Original Soundtrack from the Motion Picture (1980)
- Ray Barretto – La Cuna (1981)
- Steven Kindler – Across a Rainbow Sea (1990)
- Various – A Very Green Christmas (1997)
- Patti Austin – Body Language (2003)
- Jane Weaver – The Silver Globe (2013)
- Suzanne Ciani & Kaitlyn Aurelia Smith – FRKWYS Vol. 13: Sunergy (2016)
- Suzanne Ciani, Alister Fawnwoda, Greg Leisz – Milan (2021)
- The Avalanches – No Bad Memories (2026)

== DVD ==
- 1997 Suzanne Ciani and The Wave Live!
- 2008 Natura Poetica
- 2008 Galapagos: A Musical Odyssey
- 2020 "A Life in Waves" Blu-Ray

== Publications ==
- 1991 Suzanne Ciani: New Age Piano (Hal Leonard)
- 1995 Suzanne Ciani: Dream Songs (Hal Leonard)
- 1999 Suzanne Ciani: Turning (Hal Leonard)
- 2007 The Best of Suzanne Ciani (Hal Leonard)

== Film scores ==
- 1981 The Incredible Shrinking Woman (Universal Pictures)
- 1986 Mother Teresa, (Petrie Productions)
- 1986 Cradle of wolves (Mexican novel - Televisa Productions)
- 2001 Mother Teresa: The Legacy (Petrie Productions)
- 2026 The History of Concrete: (Central Pictures)

== See also ==
- List of ambient music artists
