= Encounters of Every Kind =

Encounters Of Every Kind

Studio album by Meco
- Released: 1978
- Genres: Disco, funk
- Length: 31:45
- Labels: Millennium Records; RCA
- Producers: Meco Monardo, Tony Bongiovi, Harold Wheeler

Meco chronology
Star Wars and Other Galactic Funk (1977)	Encounters Of Every Kind (1978)	Meco Plays The Wizard of Oz (1979)

Professional ratings
Review scores
Source	Rating
AllMusic	3/5 stars

Encounters Of Every Kind is an album by Meco, released in 1978. It was recorded after the success of Meco's platinum-selling album Star Wars and Other Galactic Funk and contains two sides of linked songs. In contrast to the previous album (which dedicated a full side to the music from Star Wars) and contrary to an album title that suggests a similar focus on the music from Close Encounters of the Third Kind, this album is presented as a musical trip through time with stops in the age of the Dinosaurs, ancient Rome, medieval England, the Old West, 1920s Chicago and others, with no special focus on any particular film until the final track which is a version of the theme from Close Encounters of the Third Kind.

Encounters of Every Kind was the last Meco album to gain significant prominence on the Billboard charts, though he continued to record film tie-ins with disco-inspired albums for The Wizard of Oz, Superman & Other Galactic Heroes (a tie-in with Superman, which was another John Williams score) and ''Music From Star Trek & Music From The Black Hole (tie-ins with the 1979 films Star Trek: The Motion Picture and The Black Hole). None of these releases other than the Star Wars album have been released on CD, though some tracks from Close Encounters were available on the Best of Meco compact disc.

== Track listing ==
=== Side one ===
1. "Time Machine" - (0:43)
2. "In the Beginning" (Harold Wheeler) - (3:27)
3. "Roman Nights" (Harold Wheeler) - (1:26)
4. "Lady Marion" (Harold Wheeler) - (2:52)
5. "Icebound" (Harold Wheeler) - (1:20)
6. "Hot in the Saddle" (Harold Wheeler) - (4:27)

=== Side two ===
1. "Time Machine" - (0:15)
2. "Crazy Rhythm" (Irving Caesar, Joseph Meyer, Roger Wolfe Kahn) - (3:49)
3. "Topsy" (Edgar Battle, Eddie Durham) - (3:33)
4. "Meco's Theme/3w.57" (Harold Wheeler) - (5:32)
5. "Theme from 'Close Encounters'" (John Williams) - (4:21)

== Charts ==
=== Album ===
Title	Release date	Chart positions						
Title	Release date	US Billboard	US Cashbox	US Record World	US Billboard R&B	US Cashbox R&B	CAN	AUS
"Encounters Of Every Kind"	1978	#62	#53	#63	#35	#38	#58	#75

=== Singles ===
Year	Single	Chart Positions			
Year	Single	US R&B	US Dance	US Pop	AUS
1978	"Theme from Close Encounters"	#76	#33	#25	#76

== Credits ==
- Produced by Meco Monardo, Tony Bongiovi and Harold Wheeler
- Mastered by George Marino
- Recorded at:
  - Celebration Studios, N.Y.C.
  - Power Station, New York City.
- Mastered at: Sterling Sound, N.Y.C.
