= Star Wars (Main Title) =

1977 composition by John Williams

- Side A of original 1977 US single pressing

Single by John Williams

from the album Star Wars
- B-side: "Cantina Band"
- Released: July 29, 1977
- Recorded: 1977
- Genre: Film score
- Length: 5:52
- Label: 20th Century
- Songwriter: John Williams
- Producer: George Lucas

John Williams singles chronology
"Main Title (Theme from Jaws)" (1975)	"Star Wars (Main Title)" (1977)	"Theme from Close Encounters of the Third Kind" (1977)

Audio
- "Main Title" on YouTube

"Star Wars (Main Title)" is a musical theme composed and conducted by John Williams. The 1977 London Symphony Orchestra recording peaked at number ten on Billboard Hot 100 and number thirteen in Canada RPM Top Singles. Meco's disco version of "Star Wars Theme/Cantina Band" from his album Star Wars and Other Galactic Funk was a global hit in the same year.

== History ==
It is the main musical theme of Star Wars and is also considered the primary leitmotif for Luke Skywalker (Mark Hamill), the protagonist of the original Star Wars trilogy. The original 1977 recording was performed by the London Symphony Orchestra. The track became a hit in the United States (#10 on the Billboard Hot 100) and Canada (#13) during the fall of that year. The composition draws influence from Erich Wolfgang Korngold's score for the 1942 film Kings Row and Gustav Holst's "Jupiter" from his orchestral suite, The Planets.

The B side featured the original movie score of "Cantina Band".

Meco's disco re-recording of the track was featured on his album Star Wars and Other Galactic Funk. A single edit from this album, "Star Wars Theme/Cantina Band," reached number one concurrently with the chart run of Williams's original movie score version.

== Charts ==
=== Weekly charts ===
Chart (1977)	Peak position
Australia (Kent Music Report)	67
Canadian RPM Top Singles	13
Canadian RPM Adult Contemporary	7
US Billboard Hot 100	10
US Billboard Adult Contemporary	4
US Cash Box Top 100	18

=== Year-end charts ===
Chart (1977)	Rank
Canada RPM Top Singles	189
US Billboard Hot 100	99
US Adult Contemporary (Billboard)	44

== Cover versions ==
The Star Wars main title was covered by many musical artists, musicians and composers around the world. Many disco and pop music versions of the theme were recorded and rearranged by the Birchwood Pops Orchestra, the Paul Dark Orchestra, the Marty Gold Orchestra, Sideral Band, Graffiti Orchestra, Galaxy 42, the Sonic All-Stars, the Rebel Force Band, the Peter Hamilton Orchestra, the Now Sound Orchestra, the Magic Fantasy Orchestra, Neil Norman, Wonderland Space Shuttle, the Lovelets, Digital Masters, the Kid Stuff Repertory Company, the John Blackinsell Orchestra, the Planet Robots, the Force, Bang Bang Robot and M.B.4..

- Patrick Gleeson recorded his synth-pop version of the theme, which is featured in his album Patrick Gleeson's Star Wars, a month after the release of the London Symphony Orchestra performance. His version was released in France and the United States.
- The Electric Moon Orchestra performed a synthesized arrangement of the main title for their album Music from Star Wars.
- Don Ellis recorded his jazz version of the main title for his album Music from Other Galaxies and Planets.
- Maynard Ferguson recorded a fusion version of the theme with his big band, first released on his album New Vintage and later as a single in August 1977.
- René Joly recorded a song set to the main title, "La Guerre des étoiles" (lit. '"The War of the Stars"'), with lyrics written by Étienne Roda-Gil.
- Raymond Lefèvre conducted a pop version of the theme which was featured on his 1977 album Love in Stereo Nº 1.
- David Matthews recorded a jazz-funk version of the theme on his 1977 album Dune.
- Geoff Love had twice covered the theme from Star Wars in 1978, first in a disco version on the album Close Encounters of the Third Kind and Other Disco Galactic Themes and in a orchestral version on the album Star Wars and Other Space Themes.
- Ferrante & Teicher performed a cover version of the theme on their same-titled 1978 album Star Wars.
- Phill Pratt performed a reggae version of the theme for his 1978 album Star Wars Dub.
- The New Zealand Army Band performed a brass version of the theme for their 1978 album Star Brass.
- Richard "Groove" Holmes recorded a composite cover version of the main title for his 1978 album Star Wars/Close Encounters, which combined the Star Wars theme with the theme from Close Encounters of the Third Kind.
