= Close Encounters of the Third Kind (soundtrack) =

Close Encounters of the Third Kind (Original Motion Picture Soundtrack)
- Original 1977 soundtrack album

Film score by John Williams
- Released: 1977
- Recorded: June 1976 – October 1977
- Studios: Warner Bros. Studios, Burbank; 20th Century Fox Studios
- Genres: Soundtrack, Classical
- Length: 41 minutes (Original album and cassette); 44 minutes (re-issued cassette); 77 minutes (Collector's Edition CD)
- Label: Arista
- Producer: John Williams

John Williams chronology
| Star Wars Episode IV: A New Hope (1977) | Close Encounters of the Third Kind (Original Motion Picture Soundtrack) (1977) | Jaws 2 (1978) |

Alternative cover
- 1998 Collector's Edition soundtrack

Professional ratings
Review scores
| Source | Rating |
|---|---|
| AllMusic | 5/5 stars |
| Filmtracks | 4/5 stars |

Close Encounters of the Third Kind (Original Motion Picture Soundtrack) is the film score to the 1977 film of the same name, composed and conducted by John Williams, and performed by the Hollywood Studio Symphony. The soundtrack album was released on vinyl album (with a gatefold sleeve), 8-track tape and audio cassette by Arista Records in 1977, with a total running time of 41 minutes (it was later released on compact disc in 1990). The soundtrack album was a commercial success, peaking at #17 on the US Billboard album chart in February 1978 and was certified Gold by the RIAA for 500,000 copies shipped. It also peaked at #40 in the UK album charts.

Five-note tonal phrase featured in the story

Although not included on the original soundtrack album, a 7" single of a disco treatment of the five-note motif, titled, "Theme from Close Encounters of the Third Kind", was included with the album as a free bonus item. Despite being a giveaway, Billboard chart rules at that time allowed the single itself to chart, and it peaked at #13 on the US Billboard Hot 100 in March 1978. The single was later added as a bonus track to the cassette.

Following the twentieth anniversary re-release of the film in 1998, a new expanded soundtrack was released on compact disc by Arista. The "Collector's Edition Soundtrack" was made using 20-bit digital remastering from the original tapes, and contained 26 tracks totalling 77 minutes of music. The CD also came with extensive liner notes, including an interview with Williams. Cues were given new titles, and it also contained previously unreleased material, as well as material that was recorded but never used in the film. La-La Land Records reissued the soundtrack on November 28, 2017, in recognition of the film's fortieth anniversary.

The score features some of Williams' most complex and modernistic writing, making use of extended orchestral techniques and atonality.

== Track listing ==
=== 1977 original album ===
Side A
| No. | Title | Length |
|---|---|---|
| 1. | "Main Title and Mountain Visions" |
| 2. | "Nocturnal Pursuit" |
| 3. | "The Abduction of Barry" |
| 4. | "I Can't Believe It's Real" |
| 5. | "Climbing Devil's Tower" |
| 6. | "The Arrival of Sky Harbor" |

Side B
| No. | Title | Length |
|---|---|---|
| 1. | "Night Siege" |
| 2. | "The Conversation" |
| 3. | "The Appearance of the Visitors" |
| 4. | "Resolution and End Titles" |
| 5. | "Theme from "Close Encounters of the Third Kind"†" |

† 1978 reissue – bonus track (cassette), free bonus 7" single (vinyl album).

=== 1998 Collector's Edition ===
| No. | Title | Length |
|---|---|---|
| 1. | "Opening: Let There Be Light" | 0:49 |
| 2. | "Navy Planes" | 2:06 |
| 3. | "Lost Squadron" | 2:23 |
| 4. | "Roy's First Encounter" | 2:41 |
| 5. | "Encounter at Crescendo Summit" | 1:21 |
| 6. | "Chasing UFOs" | 1:18 |
| 7. | "False Alarm" | 1:42 |
| 8. | "Barry's Kidnapping" | 6:19 |
| 9. | "The Cover-Up" | 2:25 |
| 10. | "Stars and Trucks" | 0:44 |
| 11. | "Forming The Mountain" | 1:49 |
| 12. | "TV Reveals" | 1:49 |
| 13. | "Roy and Gillian on the Road" | 1:10 |
| 14. | "The Mountain" | 3:31 |
| 15. | "Who Are You People?" | 1:35 |
| 16. | "The Escape" | 2:18 |
| 17. | "The Escape (Alternate Cue)" | 2:40 |
| 18. | "Trucking" | 2:01 |
| 19. | "Climbing The Mountain" | 2:32 |
| 20. | "Outstretch Hands" | 2:47 |
| 21. | "Lightshow" | 3:43 |
| 22. | "Barnstorming" | 4:25 |
| 23. | "The Mothership" | 4:33 |
| 24. | "Wild Signals" | 4:12 |
| 25. | "The Returnees" | 3:45 |
| 26. | "The Visitors / "Bye" / End Titles: The Special Edition (Contains a sample of "When You Wish Upon a Star")" | 12:32 |

=== 2017 La-La Land Records' 40th Anniversary release ===
All tracks are written by John Williams.

Disc 1: Expanded Soundtrack Presentation
| No. | Title | Length |
|---|---|---|
| 1. | "Main Title and The Vision ‡" | 1:29 |
| 2. | "Navy Planes" | 2:15 |
| 3. | "Lost Squadron" | 2:34 |
| 4. | "Trucking" | 2:09 |
| 5. | "Into the Tunnel and Chasing UFOs" | 3:56 |
| 6. | "Crescendo Summit" | 1:25 |
| 7. | "False Alarm and The Helicopter" | 4:20 |
| 8. | "Barry's Kidnapping" | 6:22 |
| 9. | "Forming the Mountain" | 1:58 |
| 10. | "TV Reveals / Across Country" | 2:53 |
| 11. | "The Mountain" | 3:36 |
| 12. | "The Cover-up and Base Camp" | 3:56 |
| 13. | "The Escape" | 2:20 |
| 14. | "Climbing the Mountain" | 2:36 |
| 15. | "Outstretched Hands" | 2:50 |
| 16. | "The Light Show" | 3:47 |
| 17. | "Barnstorming" | 4:31 |
| 18. | "The Mothership" | 4:35 |
| 19. | "The Dialogue" | 4:28 |
| 20. | "The Returnees" | 3:58 |
| 21. | "The Appearance of the Visitors +" | 4:56 |
| 22. | "Contact" | 3:22 |
| 23. | "End Titles +" | 4:27 |
| Total length: | | 78:43 |

+ Contains "When You Wish Upon a Star" (interpolated), written by Ned Washington and Leigh Harline.

All tracks are written by John Williams.

Disc 2: Alternates and Additional Music
| No. | Title | Length |
|---|---|---|
| 1. | "Main Title ‡" | 1:18 |
| 2. | "Roy's First Encounter" | 2:44 |
| 3. | "Encounter at Crescendo Summit" | 1:25 |
| 4. | "Chasing UFOs" | 1:22 |
| 5. | "Watching the Skies †" | 1:20 |
| 6. | "Vision Takes Shape †" | 0:42 |
| 7. | "Another Vision †" | 0:42 |
| 8. | "False Alarm" | 1:45 |
| 9. | "The Abduction of Barry" | 4:36 |
| 10. | "The Cover-up" | 2:31 |
| 11. | "TV Reveals" | 1:52 |
| 12. | "Roy and Jillian on the Road" | 1:20 |
| 13. | "I Can't Believe It's Real" | 3:25 |
| 14. | "Across the Fields" | 1:20 |
| 15. | "Stars and Trucks" | 0:49 |
| 16. | "Who Are You People?" | 1:38 |
| 17. | "The Escape (Alternate)" | 2:41 |
| 18. | "Climbing Devils Tower" | 2:11 |
| 19. | "Dark Side of the Moon †" | 1:34 |
| 20. | "The Approach †" | 4:32 |
| 21. | "Night Siege" | 6:27 |
| 22. | "The Conversation" | 2:23 |
| 23. | "Inside +†" | 2:34 |
| 24. | "Contact † (Alternate)" | 2:51 |
| 25. | "Eleventh Commandment †" | 2:00 |
| 26. | "TV Western †" | 1:06 |
| 27. | "Lava Flow †" | 1:47 |
| 28. | "The Five Tones †" | 2:25 |
| 29. | "Advance Scout Greeting †" | 2:58 |
| 30. | "The Dialogue (Early Version) †" | 3:12 |
| 31. | "Resolution and End Title" | 6:55 |
| Total length: | | 74:25 |

+ Contains "When You Wish Upon a Star" (interpolated), written by Ned Washington and Leigh Harline.
† Previously unreleased.
‡ Contains previously unreleased material.

== Charts ==
| Chart (1978) | Peak position |
|---|---|
| Australia (Kent Music Report) | 37 |
| Canada Top Albums/CDs (RPM) | 13 |
| New Zealand Albums (RMNZ) | 34 |
| UK Albums (Official Charts) | 40 |
| US Billboard 200 | 17 |
