= Tuff Darts =

American punk rock band

- Origin: New York City, United States
- Genres: Punk rock; glam punk
- Years active: Mid-late 1970s; 2002; 2007; 2009; 2011
- Label: Sire Records
- Past members: Robert Gordon (vocals); Jeff Salen (guitar); Bobby Butani (guitar); John DeSalvo (bass); Jim Morrison (drums); Tommy Frenzy (vocals and guitar); John Morelli(drums); Harley Fine (guitar)

Tuff Darts was an American punk rock band. They were one of the first bands to establish an audience at CBGB. They reached their greatest fame in the mid-late 1970s with such songs as "Slash", "(Your Love Is Like) Nuclear Waste" and their biggest single, "All for the Love of Rock and Roll", which was written by Jeff Salen and Bobby Butani and recorded by Ram Jam in 1977 after Tuff Darts recorded the song for the Live at CBGB's compilation. The band appeared at popular New York City clubs like Max's Kansas City and CBGB and featured Robert Gordon (vocals), Jeff Salen (guitar), Bobby Butani (guitar), John DeSalvo (bass), and Jim Morrison (drums). This was the original band that was on the Live at CBGB's compilation record in 1976. After parting ways with Gordon, John Morelli (an Ian Hunter protégé), replaced Jim Morrison on drums and the band eventually found new lead singer Tommy Frenzy (Frenesi). In 1978, the group released their debut album Tuff Darts!, on Sire Records, produced by Bob Clearmountain and Tony Bongiovi, shortly before disbanding.

Tuff Darts reunited in 2002 to play a gig upon the release of Tuff Darts! on compact disc. They subsequently played several additional shows and recorded one more album, 2007's You Can't Keep A Good Band Down. It was only released in Japan.

In 2009, Spectra Records released two albums worldwide, Here Comes Trouble and You Can't Keep a Good Band Down. Tuff Darts!, You Can't Keep a Good Band Down and Here Comes Trouble are now available as downloads.

Jeff Salen, founder and lead guitarist of the band, died of a heart attack on January 26, 2008, at age 55.

Tuff Darts have been performing since 2011 with a reformed lineup in and around New York City.

== Discography ==
- Tuff Darts! (1978)
