= Star Wars and Other Galactic Funk =

Studio album by Meco
- Released: Mid-1977
- Recorded: June 1977
- Studio: MZH, New York City
- Genre: Disco; jazz fusion
- Length: 28:20
- Label: Millennium
- Producer: Meco; Harold Wheeler; Tony Bongiovi

Meco chronology
| Star Wars and Other Galactic Funk (1977) | Encounters of Every Kind (1978) |

Singles from Star Wars and Other Galactic Funk
- 1. "Star Wars Theme/Cantina Band" Released: c. June or July 1977

Star Wars and Other Galactic Funk is the debut studio album by the American musician Meco, released through Millennium Records in 1977. Meco, who had a steady career as a session musician and producer, was an avid fan of science fiction. Upon watching Star Wars (1977), he conceived the idea of reworking its score; he later had a meeting with Neil Bogart of Casablanca Records who approved the project. By June 1977, Meco was working with Tony Bongiovi and Harold Wheeler, recording at MZH Studio, New York City, for three weeks. Star Wars and Other Galactic Funk is a disco and jazz fusion album that consists of two medleys. "Star Wars" comprises nine sections, recreating sounds from the movie, and "Other Galactic Funk" consists of three sections.

Critics gave Star Wars and Other Galactic Funk positive reviews, with many complimenting the songwriting. The album peaked at number 13 on the Billboard Top LPs & Tape chart in the United States, at number 19 in Australia, and number 34 in New Zealand. "Star Wars Theme/Cantina Band" was released as the lead single in June or July 1977; it peaked at number one on the Billboard Hot 100 for two weeks. RCA Records issued the album in the UK after acquiring the worldwide rights for Millennium Records, promoting it with a 12-week-long campaign that coincided with the UK release of Star Wars at the end of 1977. The album's success helped fund construction of Bongiovi's Power Station Studios and Meco signed to Robert Stigwood Organization (RSO); he would later work on several Star Wars-related releases. Guinness World Records listed "Star Wars Theme/Cantina Band" as the best-selling instrumental single and the only instrumental single to achieve platinum certification by the RIAA.

== Background ==
American musician Meco Monardo worked as a session musician between 1965 and 1974. He would split his work as an arranger, collaborating with Tommy James and contributing music to television advertisements. When disco music started to emerge in 1974, Meco founded Disco Corporation of America with Tony Bongiovi. At this stage, Meco started producing records for artists; he co-produced "Never Can Say Goodbye" (1974) by Gloria Gaynor, which became a hit single, with Bongiovi and Harold Wheeler. It earned Meco his breakthrough, and he later worked on "Doctor's Orders" (1974) by Carol Douglas. By 1977, disco music had a noticeable presence on music charts. Meco was a fan of science fiction; he read novels during his high-school years and had seen various film in that genre.

Meco went to watch Star Wars on May 25, 1977—its opening day—and watched it four more times during the weekend. During the second of these viewings, he paid more attention to John Williams' film's score, having been drawn to the plot and characters on the first viewing. Meco said he "wanted to take that music and dance to it". He then proposed recording a disco iteration of Williams' score to several record labels, eventually meeting with Casablanca Records founder Neil Bogart and Millennium Records president Jimmy Ienner. (Note: Music executive Larry Harris said Casablanca did not appear as a figurehead until they had subsidiaries under their operation. As such, they bought Oasis Records, ran by Giorgio Moroder, in 1975, and started working with Douglas Records in July 1976. Casablanca then sought to work with Millennium Records, which was operated by Irv Biegel and Jimmy Ienner. Jeff Franklin of booking agency ATI brokered a deal between Bogart and Millennium Records, setting up an office space with them in New York City in March 1977.) Bogart, who had helped popularize eurodisco and Kiss, viewed the film before agreeing to the project. Days after the meeting, work began on an album. Because the Star Wars soundtrack had not yet been released, Meco contacted the music publishing department of 20th Century Fox Records and persuaded the receptionist to give him a copy of the score.

== Recording ==
By mid-June 1977, Meco hired co-producers Bongiovi and Wheeler to assist him before sessions took place at MZH Studio in New York City with Harvey Hoffman as recording engineer. Bongiovi and Meco created a club rendition of Star Wars they hoped would sell around 50,000 copies. The former had experience with making disco albums, and had recently worked with Ramones and Talking Heads. Bongiovi recorded special studio-tape effects and acted as remix engineer. Suzanne Ciani contributed special sounds and electronic musical effects, the latter using a Buchla-branded synthesizer.

A 70-piece orchestra, with Meco on trombone, was employed for the recordings, to capture the sound of Williams and his orchestra. While sessions were underway, Williams' score was achieving success and the film's main theme had charted on the Billboard Hot 100. Sessions lasted three weeks with everyone in high spirits. One of the producers was concerned with the lack of melody while the other said; "I don't hear a single". As a result of these comments, Meco and an engineer edited the two-track master; they shortened the intro section that includes the main theme and assembled the Cantina section, looping it back into the main theme.

== Composition ==
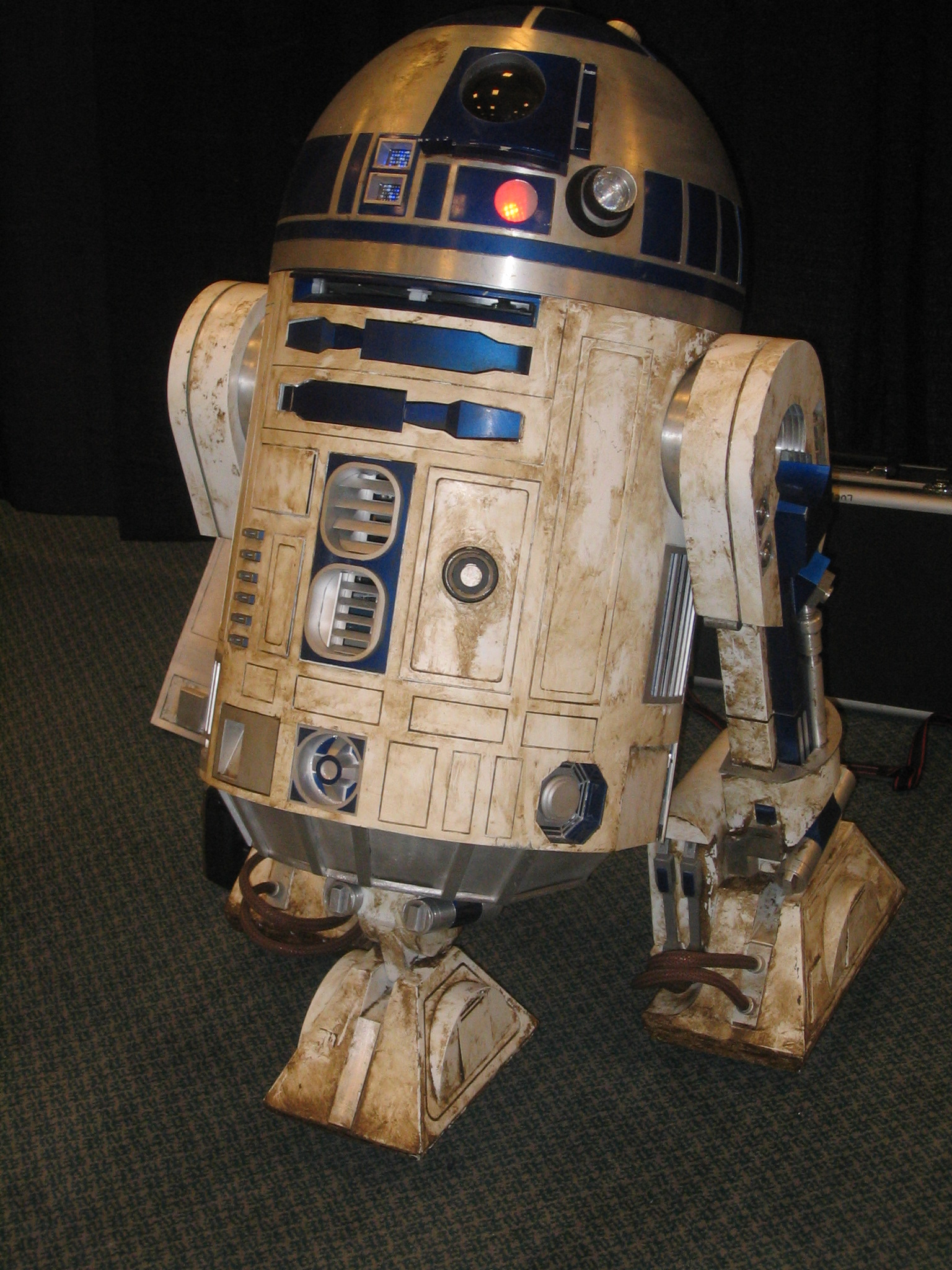
Meco spent eight hours trying to replicate the sounds of R2-D2 (pictured) on early synthesizers.

Star Wars and Other Galactic Funk is a disco and jazz fusion album; Cooper Peltz of Film School Rejects wrote Meco used the album medium to give an "alternate story of the characters" from Star Wars. According to Peltz; "Luke [Skywalker], [Princess] Leia, and the gang existed in our universe where Disco (not late-Romantic classical) music was the idiom of the time". Star Wars and Other Galactic Funk is split into two sides of music. Despite having experience as an arranger, Meco engaged Wheeler to arrange the album; Meco and Wheeler had several meetings discussing their plans for the project; Meco told Wheeler what he wanted to hear and allowed him to write notes. The musicians involved became more enthusiastic about the project as publicity around Star Wars was building. Meco reworked Williams' Star Wars theme and the "Cantina Theme" into a medley, adding disco drum beats and an orchestra, and extending it to 15 minutes. Meco got the idea of making a continuous medley from Tom Moulton, who used the idea on the Gloria Gaynor album Never Can Say Goodbye in 1975. When the trumpet section performed the melody line, Meco added an electric guitar to accompany it.

Journalist Vince Aletti of Record World wrote "Star Wars", the album's first side, is a blend of "moods—at times dramatically 'futuristic,' both symphonic and electronic ... [and] at other times, whimsical, big band jazzy, then grandiose, almost pompous toward the end". The medley consists of nine connected pieces of music. It is a space disco song that includes sound effects that resemble those in the film, such as the noises of R2-D2, the "pew-pew" gun sound, and the hum of a lightsaber, giving the song an electronic atmosphere. Because the album was not a licensed project, the sounds had to be remade using synthesizers; due to the basic nature of the equipment, achieving an effect resembling R2-D2 took Meco eight hours. For the "Cantina Band" section, four saxophonists recorded their parts while the tape was recording at half-speed. When it was replayed at normal speed, the saxophone parts had what Meco referred to as a "really high, funny" sound.

"Other Galactic Funk" is a 13-minute instrumental track on the album's second side; it consists of pieces that were influenced by Williams' score. All three pieces are credited to Wheeler and Solomon Smith. Meco was inspired for this side when he was walking through Central Park, New York City, where he heard music drifting over a hill. He found six children from a drum corps group performing beats; when they took a break, he invited the children to help finish the album. An hour of drum beats was recorded the following day; Wheeler turned these into three separate pieces.

== Release and promotion ==
"Star Wars Theme/Cantina Band" was released as the lead single from Star Wars and Other Galactic Funk in June or July 1977. Unsure of the viability of Meco's album, Bogart had to persuade Ienner to issue it through Millennium, who did not like the idea. Harris said Casablanca would not have minded having Meco on their roster; he deemed it crucial that Millennium "establish itself as a bona fide presence" in the music industry, "and nothing spoke louder than a Platinum[-certified] album." Bogart was confident in the possible success of Meco's album, with Ienner ultimately relenting to its release. Star Wars and Other Galactic Funk was issued in summer 1977 through Millennium Records, six weeks after the film's soundtrack. (Note: Since the album was scheduled around the same timeframe as the Star Wars soundtrack, Harris said 20th Century Fox Records "clearly had the upper hand." Casablanca's promotions department had conference calls on a weekly basis to bolster hype around a particular release. According to Harris, when discussing Meco's album, vice president of promotions Bruce Bird pitched it as a battle between them and 20th Century Fox Records, and referred to Casablanca as underdogs in that situation. The day after this call, promotions staff discovered a delivery credited to 20th Century Fox's head of promotions Harvey Cooper, declaring that they planned to eclipse Casablanca with their soundtrack. The promotions team at Casablanca did not take this lightly and pushed back, eventually securing them the label's first number one single with "Star Wars Theme/Cantina Band". Harris revealed that Cooper had not sent the delivery; instead, it was Casablanca's publicist Soozin Kazick acting on the orders of Bird to heighten the staff's morale.) The artwork, which is based on Meco's idea, depicts "two space travelers bumping bottoms", which AllMusic reviewer JT Griffith called "hilarious cheese". Stephen Lumel and Gribbitt! handled the art direction and design, while Robert Rodriquez illustrated the album. Rodriquez, who was known for his artwork for the Quaker Oats Company, disliked disco music and preferred folk rock over it. He had initially tried to avoid making the cover because he was given a shortened deadline of three days, until Lumel persuaded him to do it. The album received promotion from Casablanca's R&B department; according to senior vice-president Cecil Holmes, "We're effective because all our promotion people are also capable sales and marketing people, too".

Star Wars and Other Galactic Funk appeared as part of Casablanca Records' intentionally disco-centric schedule alongside releases from Beckett (Disco Calypso), Eddie Drennon (Would You Dance to My Music), and Village People (Village People). Meco did not make personal appearances to promote the album; combined with a lack of images of him, one radio presenter thought Meco was a Japanese group. In August 1977, RCA Records acquired the worldwide rights to Millennium's output, and issued "Star Wars Theme/Cantina Band" and Star Wars and Other Galactic Funk in the United Kingdom as the first releases from the deal. A promotional, DJ-exclusive version of "Star Wars Theme/Cantina Band" was released in September 1977. An RCA-branded version of the album was released in the UK in November 1977. Coinciding with the UK release of the film in December 1977, RCA Records planned a 12-week promotional campaign for Star Wars and Other Galactic Funk that included a £10,000, 30-second advertisement that was expected to be shown in the cinemas that screened Star Wars. Product manager Greg Lynn said 90,000 individuals per week would see the advertisement, which was to be supported by placements in local newspapers. Competitions in which people would win copies of the album and tickets for Star Wars were also planned; Lynn said this initiative would help to drive disco music, which up to this point had been seen as a single-centric format, as an album format.

In May 1999, Hip-O Records reissued Star Wars and Other Galactic Funk on CD; it includes "Star Wars Theme/Cantina Band" and the promotional DJ version as bonus tracks. The album was re-pressed on vinyl in 2015 through Casablanca Records. The entirety of the album, in addition to "Star Wars Theme/Cantina Band", was included on the compilation The Best of Meco (1997). Meco re-recorded the "Star Wars" medley, alongside pieces from the other Star Wars films, for Dance Your Asteroids Off: The Complete Star Wars Collection (2000).

== Reception ==
Professional ratings
Review scores
| Source | Rating |
|---|---|
| AllMusic | 4/5 stars |
| Record Mirror | 3/5 |

Music critics gave Star Wars and Other Galactic Funk favorable reviews; many reviewers praised the album's songwriting. Griffith described it as an "important genre-busting album [that] is most enjoyable in its original form". Jason Heller, author of Strange Stars: David Bowie, Pop Music, and the Decade Sci-Fi Exploded (2018), wrote that public perception of the album is as a "novelty record, a piece of opportunistic, dollar-chasing dreck. Actually, the opposite is true. It's a work of superb musicianship, intricate arrangement, symphonic scope, and interpretive imagination." According to Aletti, the album is "fun, occasionally compelling dance music but the soft, slow spots might keep it from being played straight through". Billboard staff said the album's first half's "beauty and variety ... combined with the film's fanatic appeal, brings it powerful impact", while its second "still works as a single piece, though [is it] not nearly as effectively as the Star Wars side". Music Week expressed a similar statement, saying the second side is a "complete throwaway – disco dross with a pseudo military beat that is dead dull". The staff of Cashbox said the album is "reasonably true to the original score, even while infusing it with a throbbing dance beat", adding listener do not need to watch the movie to enjoy it. Jim Evans of Record Mirror wrote:

So, when you've bathed in your Star Wars bubble bath, put on your Star Wars T-shirt, cleaned your teeth with Star Wars wonder paste, shot the cat with your Star Wars pocket ray gun and rushed out to buy a couple rolls of Star Wars loo paper, you can sit back and listen to music inspired by Star Wars".

=== Commercial performance ===
Star Wars and Other Galactic Funk sold a million copies, surpassing sales of the Star Wars soundtrack. In the US, it peaked at number 13 on the Billboard 200 and number eight on the Top R&B chart. It reached number 19 in Australia and number 34 in New Zealand. The album was certified platinum in the US by the RIAA and gold in Canada. It is one of 20 Casablanca Records albums to achieve platinum status in a time span of three years. (Note: Journalist Peter Shapiro, in his book Turn the Beat Around: The Secret History of Disco (2005), wrote that one of Bogart's main business practices was "shipping records platinum, even those by unknown artists, and counting the shipped records as sales".)

"Star Wars Theme/Cantina Band" reached number one on the Billboard Hot 100, following Millennium Records' hit song "Platinum Heroes" (1977) by Bruce Foster weeks prior. "Star Wars Theme/Cantina Band" remained at number one for two weeks and was replaced by "You Light Up My Life" (1977) by Debby Boone. "Star Wars Theme/Cantina Band" appeared on other Billboard charts, peaking at number six on Dance Club Songs number eight on Hot R&B Songs and number 18 on Adult Contemporary. It peaked at number three in Australia, number five in New Zealand, number seven in the Wallonia region of Belgium and on the UK Singles Chart, number ten in the Netherlands, number 12 in the Flanders region of Belgium, and number 13 in Sweden. The song was certified platinum in Canada and the US, and sold two million copies in the US and four million worldwide. It was nominated for a Best Pop Instrumental Performance award at the 20th Annual Grammy Awards in 1977, losing to Williams' original version of the Star Wars main theme. Williams sent Meco a plaque bearing the artwork of Star Wars and Other Galactic Funk and note saying; "Dear Meco: You're my Grammy winner", thanking him for his iteration of the theme.

== Aftermath and legacy ==
By October 1977, Herb Eiseman of the music publishing company 20th Century Music, which published the Star Wars soundtrack, noted there were at least six albums and seven singles that use music from the movie, including Meco's, and there were "two others in the works, including a jazz version". According to Griffith, Williams listed Meco's album as a reason for "helping bring symphonic music further into the mainstream". In a November 1977 edition of Music Week, Adam White noted a trend of science-fiction-themed releases in the charts from the preceding months, including "Star Wars Theme/Cantina Band" by Meco, "Magic Fly" by Space, and "Calling Occupants of Interplanetary Craft" by the Carpenters. Jason Heller, in Strange Stars, retrospectively wrote the science-fiction and disco genres "independently of each other, became mainstream lifestyle choices in 1977 thanks to Stars Wars and Saturday Night Fever, so it was inevitable that the two would somehow dovetail" into the creation of Meco's iteration of the Star Wars theme. Peltz wrote the album is "one of the first forays into fanfic in the Blockbuster era". He noted while Saturday Night Fever was released after the release of Star Wars and Other Galactic Funk, "the nightclub-going public was at the height of their Disco obsession, which added to the album's popularity". Bongiovi said the album's success helped pay for the construction of his Power Station Studios facility in New York City, the construction of which he self-funded. Rodriquez lamented the lack of time he had to make the artwork; he later saw it featured in an art show about the worst album covers.

Joe Lynch of Billboard said "Star Wars Theme/Cantina Band" is "one of the most frequently ignored parts of Star Wars lore", adding the album's "pornographic Jetsons cover art is partly to blame" for this. Guinness World Records lists it as the best-selling instrumental single and the only instrumental single to achieve platinum certification by the RIAA. With the album's success, Meco signed to the Robert Stigwood Organization (RSO). The track prompted numerous imitators, including Bang Bang Robot, Galaxy 42, and David Matthews; Heller said these artists "also delivered credible interpretations. But Meco's loving homage became the benchmark for Star Wars-inspired music to come." The track also informed Meco's career in making disco iterations of science-fiction theme songs, such as his next release Encounters of Every Kind (1977); he also recorded Moondancer (1979), an album of original works, which is a concept album about a club on the moon's surface. Meco released further Star Wars-related material in the following years, including an album of music based on The Empire Strikes Back, Meco Plays Music from the Empire Strikes Back (1980), the holiday record Christmas in the Stars (1980), and Star Wars Dance Party (2005), which was inspired by Star Wars: Episode I – The Phantom Menace (1999). Star Wars creator George Lucas officially sanctioned Christmas in the Stars, and allowed the use of sound effects from the films and Anthony Daniels as C-3PO performing vocals on one track. The Companion writer Issy Flower said "Star Wars Theme/Cantina Band" laid the foundation for "successful disco renderings of [movie] themes that retained their musicality and incorporated a danceable beat".

== Track listing ==
Side one written by John Williams; side two written by Harold Wheeler and Solomon Smith. All tracks produced by Meco, Wheeler and Tony Bongiovi.

Side one

1. Star Wars – 15:49
  - "Title Theme"
  - "Imperial Attack"
  - "The Desert & the Robot Auction"
  - "The Princess Appears"
  - "The Land of the Sand People"
  - "Princess Leia's Theme"
  - "Cantina Band"
  - "The Last Battle"
  - "The Throne Room & End Title"

Side two

1. Other Galactic Funk – 12:31
  - "Other"
  - "Galactic"
  - "Funk"

== Personnel ==
Personnel per booklet.

Musicians from the Milky Way Galaxy

- Allan Schwartzberg – drums
- Jimmy Young – drums
- Dor McBrene – drums
- Richard Crooks – drums
- Steve Gadd – drums
- Barry Lazarowitz – drums
- Will Lee – bass
- Neil Jason – bass
- Obb Sretlaw – bass, violins
- Marcus Miller – bass
- Anthony Jackson – bass
- Lamer Murnhab – guitars, violins
- Lance Quinn – guitars
- Cliff Morris – guitars
- Nyto Bongi – guitars
- David Spinozza – guitars
- Simm Tenaj – guitars
- John Tropea – guitars
- Bob Cadway – guitars
- Atten Lessik – guitars, auto-harps
- Bobby Mann – guitars
- Danny Gatton – guitars
- Steve Love – guitars
- Eric Rosenfeld – guitars
- Jeff Mironov – guitars
- Harold Wheeler – keyboards
- Drasan Thims – keyboards
- Pat Rebillot – keyboards
- Robbie Kondor – keyboards, synthesizers
- Peter Phillips – keyboards
- Meco – keyboards, makkies
- Richard Trifan – synthesizers
- Lloyd Landesman – synthesizers
- Ed Walsh – synthesizers
- Dave Carey – percussion
- Rubens Bassini – percussion
- Retsim Ocem – percussion
- Anthony Eversley – percussion
- Thomas Simons – percussion
- Nor Thornaring – percussion
- Vincent Lilly – percussion
- Kirk Parson – percussion
- Kendall Turner – percussion
- Timothy Thompson – percussion
- Solomon Smith – percussion
- John Purcell-Butchie – percussion
- Gene Bianca – auto-harps
- Ynned Lessick – auto-harps, violins
- Gloria Agostini – auto-harps
- Nad Dnalloh – auto-harps
- Gene Orloff – violins
- Paul Gershman – violins
- Charles LiBove – violins
- Sanford Allen – violins
- Derf Odranom – violins
- Gerald Tarack – violins

Musicians from the Milky Way Galaxy (continued)

- Harold Kohon – violins
- Brab Ferag – violins
- Arianne Bronne – violins
- Nomeg Oirepim – violins
- Paul Winter – violins
- Nam Elohass – violins
- Naje Spua – violins
- Aniad Chacen – violins
- Guy Lumia – violins
- Lou Eley – violins
- Onty Anmodro – violins
- Dave Davis – violins
- LaMar Alsop – violins, violas
- Leanie Kranf – violins
- Kermie Ceedu – violins
- Simm Tenaj – violins
- John Pintaville – violins
- Thatie Notswin – violins
- Simm Amorni – violins
- Tomen Risom – violins
- Harry Lookofsky – violins
- Nala Lebos – violins
- David Nadien – violins
- Elliot Rosoff – violins
- Tomen Risorm – violins
- Mij EuQnic – violins
- Irving Spice – violins
- Harry C. – violins
- Lady Marion – violins
- Yrrah Htoob – violins
- Voh Kehc – violins
- Semaj Kirk – violins
- Nacluv – violins
- Kcops – violins
- Senob Yocum – violins
- Regis Iandioria – violins
- Marin Morgenstern – violins
- Tony Posk – violins
- Jack Zimmerman – violins
- Emong-Divad-Nhoj – violins
- Aaron Rosand – violins
- Retsim Adoy – violins
- Marilyn Wright – violins
- Odnal – violins
- Abob Ttef – violins
- Oted Otra – violins
- La Yruoc – violins
- Ibonek Nawibo – violins
- Richard Maximoff – violas
- Sec Nurf – violas
- Yug Aimul – violas
- Royam Dowe – violas
- Ted Israel – violas
- Dickie Max – violas
- Max Richards – violas
- Jesse Levy – cellos

Musicians from the Milky Way Galaxy (continued)

- Yhtac Truax – cellos
- Richard Loaker – cellos
- Paul Brand – cellos
- Rairy Leicher – cellos
- Het Mogen – cellos
- Mijmy Nernie – cellos
- Aruhu Ulus – cellos
- Neddor Yrreb – cellos
- Ymmij Rennei – cellos
- Egroeg Sacuf – cellos
- Redav Htrad – cellos
- Alan Rubin – trumpets
- Lew Soloff – trumpets
- Aynot Tinto – trumpets
- Randy Brecker – trumpets
- Jon Faddis – trumpets
- Bob Millikan – trumpets
- Dan Cahn – trumpets
- Mike Lawrence – trumpets
- John Gatchel – trumpets
- Wayne Andre – trombones
- Raryl Scomb – trombones
- Dom Monardo – trombones
- Sonny Russo – trombones
- Dave Taylor – trombones
- Eddie Bert – trombones
- Paul Faulise – trombones
- Dick Hixson – trombones
- Alan Raplh – trombones
- Tony Stud – trombones
- Keith O'Quinn – trombones
- Lou DelGatto – reeds
- Thatie Notswin – reeds
- George Marge – reeds
- Dave Tofani – reeds
- Eddie Daniels – reeds
- Morris Mamorsky – reeds
- George Young – reeds
- Phil Bodner – reeds
- Jerry Dodgien – reeds
- Jim Buffington – French horns
- Nitac Palkan – French horns
- Fred Griffin – French horns
- John Clark – French horns
- Bill Brown – French horns

Production and design

- Meco – producer
- Harold Wheeler – producer, arranger
- Tony Bongiovi – producer, special studio tape effects, remix engineer
- Betty Rowland – music preparation
- Harvey Hoffman – recording engineer
- Stephen Lumel – art direction, design
- Gribbitt! – art direction, design
- Robert Rodriquez – illustration
- Suzanne Ciani – special sound effects, electronic musical effects

== Charts and certifications ==
=== Weekly charts ===
Weekly chart performance for Star Wars and Other Galactic Funk
| Chart (1977) | Peak position |
|---|---|
| Australian Albums (ARIA) | 19 |
| New Zealand Albums (RMNZ) | 34 |
| US Billboard 200 | 13 |
| US Top R&B/Hip-Hop Albums (Billboard) | 8 |

=== Certifications ===
Certifications for Star Wars and Other Galactic Funk
| Region | Certification | Certified units/sales |
|---|---|---|
| Canada (Music Canada) | Gold | 50,000^{^} |
| United States (RIAA) | Platinum | 1,000,000^{^} |
^{^} Shipments figures based on certification alone.
