= Tuff Darts! =

Studio album by Tuff Darts
- Released: 1978
- Recorded: Power Station, New York City
- Genre: Rock
- Label: Sire
- Producers: Tony Bongiovi, Lance Quinn, Bob Clearmountain

Tuff Darts chronology
Tuff Darts! (1978)	You Can't Keep A Good Band Down (2007)

Professional ratings
Review scores
Source	Rating
Christgau's Record Guide	C

Tuff Darts! is a 1978 album by American punk rock band Tuff Darts. It was released on the Sire Records label. Mick Rock was responsible for the sleeve design and photography.

== Track listing ==
1. "Rats" (Butani, Salen) - 2:59
2. "Who's Been Sleeping Here?" (Mikael Kirke, Salen) - 3:00
3. "Here Comes Trouble" (Frenzy) - 2:12
4. "She's Dead" (Frenzy, Salen) - 2:39
5. "Phone Booth Man" (DeSalvo, Salen) - 3:37
6. "(Your Love Is Like) Nuclear Waste" (DeSalvo, Salen) - 2:57
7. "My Guitar Lies Bleeding in My Arms" (DeSalvo, Morelli) - 3:17
8. "Love and Trouble" (Salen) - 3:46
9. "Head Over Heels" (Jeff Salen) - 2:44
10. "Slash" (DeSalvo) - 3:31
11. "Fun City" (DeSalvo) - 2:57
12. "All for the Love of Rock N'Roll" (Butani, Salen) - 3:18

== Personnel ==
- Tommy Frenzy - Vocals
- Jeff Salen - Lead Guitar
- Bobby Butani - Guitars
- John DeSalvo - Bass
- John Morelli - Drums

Source: Tuff Darts "Tuff Darts!" album cover

== Reception ==
- Robert Christgau gave the record a C grade, stating: "Maybe Robert Gordon left this band to escape resident sickie John DeSalvo, one of those guys who sounds like he deserves to get fixed by the knife-wielding lesbians he has nightmares about. The only way to make their record more depressing would be to add a hologram of Gordon's replacement, Tommy Frenzy, whose slick blond hair and metal teeth now set the band's android-delinquent "image." Then again, you could take away Jeff Salen's guitar."
