= Christmas in the Stars =

Studio album by Meco Monardo
- Released: November 1980
- Recorded: 1980
- Genres: Christmas; pop
- Length: 33:52
- Label: RSO
- Producer: Meco Monardo

Meco Monardo chronology
Meco Plays Music from the Empire Strikes Back (1980)	Christmas in the Stars (1980)	Music from Star Trek and Music from the Black Hole (1980)

Professional ratings
Review scores
Source	Rating
Allmusic	2.5/5 stars

Christmas in the Stars: Star Wars Christmas Album is a record album produced in 1980 by RSO Records. It features recordings of Star Wars-themed Christmas songs and stories about a droid factory where the robots make toys year-round for "S. Claus".

Much of the album is sung and narrated by British actor Anthony Daniels, reprising his role as C-3PO from the Star Wars films, and written by composer-lyricist Maury Yeston. Sound designer Ben Burtt also provided sound effects for R2-D2 and Chewbacca.

== Production ==
The album was produced by Meco Monardo (who had previously recorded Star Wars and Other Galactic Funk), with the hope that this would be the first in a series of annual Star Wars Christmas albums. The title, the story, and the majority of the album's original songs, both music and lyrics, were written by Yeston, then a Yale University music professor who went on to become the twice Tony Award-winning Broadway musical composer of Nine, Titanic, and Grand Hotel. One of his songs, "What Can You Get a Wookiee for Christmas (When He Already Owns a Comb)", with vocals by Yeston, went on to become a recurring top-40 X-mas hit. The album was written in 1979, before the darker The Empire Strikes Back (1980) appeared, and the fun and light tone of it was targeted for the young audience (Yeston's own son was then 7) that had fallen in love with Artoo, Threepio, the Droids and the Wookiee.

The album is notable for featuring the first professional recording of Jon Bon Jovi (credited as "John Bongiovi", his birth name), who sang lead vocals on the song "R2-D2 We Wish You a Merry Christmas." His cousin Tony Bongiovi co-produced the album and ran the recording studio where it was recorded, where Jon was working sweeping floors at the time.

After the first printing of 150,000 copies, Meco was asked to include George Lucas' name, credited beside his under "Concept by". Due to the success of the album, the studios were ready to do a second printing, which would give Lucas credit. But before the second record pressing was done, RSO Records shut down due to an unrelated lawsuit.

== Track listing ==
All tracks written by Maury Yeston, except where noted.

Side one
No.	Title	Lead vocal	Length
1.	"Christmas in the Stars"	Anthony Daniels	3:17
2.	"Bells, Bells, Bells"	Anthony Daniels	3:15
3.	"The Odds Against Christmas"	Anthony Daniels	3:04
4.	"What Can You Get a Wookiee for Christmas (When He Already Owns a Comb?)"	Maury Yeston	3:24
5.	"R2-D2 We Wish You a Merry Christmas"	Jon Bon Jovi	3:16

Side two
No.	Title	Writer(s)	Lead vocal	Length
6.	"Sleigh Ride"	Leroy Anderson; Maury Yeston	Anthony Daniels	3:36
7.	"Merry, Merry Christmas"			2:09
8.	"A Christmas Sighting ('Twas the Night Before Christmas)"		Anthony Daniels	3:43
9.	"The Meaning of Christmas"		Anthony Daniels	8:08
Total length:				33:52

== Release ==
=== LP and cassette ===
The complete album was released by RSO records on LP and Cassette in November 1980, to cash in on the increasingly popular Star Wars saga. This original printing featured cover art by Star Wars production artist, Ralph McQuarrie. The cassette version is now quite rare and hard to come by.

Also in 1980, RSO released a 45 of "What Can You Get a Wookiee for Christmas (When He Already Owns a Comb)" (credited to The Star Wars Intergalactic Droid Choir and Chorale- actually Yeston's voice, modulated to sound 'robotic', and multi-tracked. Yeston is also the voice of Santa on "The Meaning of Christmas") backed with "R2-D2 We Wish You a Merry Christmas" with a picture sleeve. In late 1983, a second 45 from the album was released by Polygram on the RSO label, "R2D2's Sleigh Ride" backed with "Christmas in the Stars", also with a picture sleeve.

This album was one of the music industry's first non-classical-or-jazz projects to be recorded and mixed digitally, and when "What Can You Get a Wookiee for Christmas (When He Already Owns a Comb)" reached No. 69 on the Billboard Hot 100 chart in 1980 it was only the third digitally recorded single in Billboard's chart history.

=== CD editions ===
In November 1990, Polydor Records Japan released a 3-inch CD single featuring the songs "R2-D2 We Wish You a Merry Christmas" and "Christmas in the Stars". While the full album made its CD debut in 1994 as an unheralded budget-label release by JFC/Polygram Special Markets with all artwork and references to Star Wars (except those in the song titles) removed from the packaging. The only credit on the package was "Meco" and its cover featured a generic photo of Christmas boxes and decorations. However, in October 1996, during the popularity of the Star Wars: Shadows of the Empire project, the album was re-released on CD by Rhino Records with Ralph McQuarrie's original cover art restored.
