= Star Wars Theme/Cantina Band =

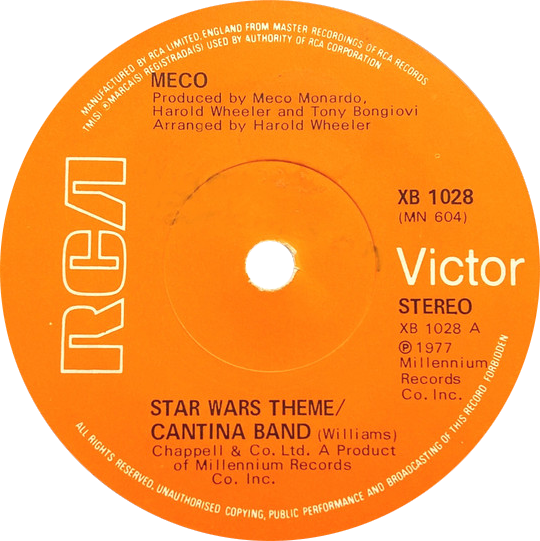
- Side A of UK 7-inch single

Single by Meco

from the album Star Wars and Other Galactic Funk
- B-side: "Funk"
- Released: 1977
- Genre: Disco; swing; instrumental
- Length: 3:32; 7:34 (DJ promo)
- Label: Millennium; RCA
- Songwriter: John Williams
- Producers: Tony Bongiovi; Domenico Monardo; Harold Wheeler

Meco singles chronology
"Star Wars Theme/Cantina Band" (1977)	"Theme from Close Encounters" (1978)

Licensed audio
- "Star Wars Theme/Cantina Band" on YouTube

"Star Wars Theme/Cantina Band" is a song recorded by Meco, taken from the album Star Wars and Other Galactic Funk. It hit number one on the Billboard Hot 100 on October 1, 1977, holding on to the spot for two weeks and peaked at no. 7 on the UK Singles Chart, remaining in the charts for nine weeks. The single was certified Platinum by the Recording Industry Association of America, having sold two million units.

"Star Wars Theme/Cantina Band" is one of two songs that became hits featuring music from the Star Wars movie. The other is "Star Wars (Main Title)," which is original music from the movie soundtrack by John Williams. The song reached the Top 10 concurrently with Meco's more popular version. Meco again jousted with Williams a few months later, with both artists issuing competing versions of music from Close Encounters of the Third Kind, both reaching the US and Canadian Top 40, but with Williams's version being more successful than Meco's.

As Meco was unavailable at the time to appear on TopPop during the peak commercial performance of the song, Penney de Jager's choreographed ballet ensemble was instead asked to perform an interpretive dance on the show, which aired on 5 November 1977 in the Netherlands.

== Charts ==
=== Weekly charts ===
Chart (1977–1978)	Peak position
Australia (Kent Music Report)	3
Belgium (Ultratop 50 Flanders)	7
Canada Adult Contemporary (RPM)	1
Canada Top Singles (RPM)	1
Ireland (IRMA)	3
Netherlands (Dutch Top 40)	8
Netherlands (Single Top 100)	10
New Zealand (Recorded Music NZ)	5
South Africa (Springbok Radio)	5
Sweden (Sverigetopplistan)	13
UK Singles (Official Charts)	7
US Billboard Hot 100	1
US Billboard Hot Disco Singles	6
US Billboard Hot Soul Singles	8
US Billboard Adult Contemporary	18
US Cash Box Top 100	1
US Record World	1

=== Year-end charts ===
Chart (1977)	Rank
Australia (Kent Music Report)	57
Belgium (Ultratop 50 Flanders)	76
Canada Top Singles (RPM)	15
Netherlands (Dutch Top 40)	43
Netherlands (Single Top 100)	56
US Billboard Hot 100	71
US Cash Box Top 100	10

Chart (1978)	Rank
Australia (Kent Music Report)	46

== Certifications ==
Region	Certification	Certified units/sales
Canada (Music Canada)	Platinum	150,000^{^}
United States (RIAA)	Platinum	2,000,000^{^}
^{^} Shipments figures based on certification alone.
