= Theme from Close Encounters of the Third Kind =

Single by John Williams

from the album Close Encounters of the Third Kind
- B-side: "Nocturnal Pursuit"
- Released: December 1977
- Recorded: 1977
- Genre: Pop
- Length: 3:13
- Label: Arista
- Songwriter: John Williams
- Producers: John Williams, Rick Chertoff

John Williams singles chronology
"Star Wars (Main Title)" (1977)	"Theme from Close Encounters of the Third Kind" (1977)	"Theme from Superman (Main Title)" (1979)

"Theme from Close Encounters of the Third Kind" is a 1978 instrumental hit single by composer John Williams. It is the main theme of the soundtrack of the movie of the same name. The song became a hit in the United States (#13) and Canada (#12) during the winter of that year.

A few months before the release of the song, Williams had released a competing version of Star Wars theme music, "Star Wars (Main Title)," which reached number 10 on the US Billboard chart, while "Star Wars Theme/Cantina Band" was a number one hit for Meco. Both artists simultaneously again issued competing versions of scores from the Close Encounters movie. This time Williams' original score came out on top, peaking at number 13, while Meco's version reached number 25.

In 1979, "Theme from Close Encounters of the Third Kind" won a Grammy Award for best instrumental composition.

Five-note phrase featured in the story

== Charts ==
=== Weekly charts ===
Chart (1977–78)	Peak position
Australia (Kent Music Report)	47
Canadian RPM Top Singles	12
Canadian RPM Adult Contemporary	19
Italy (FIMI)	21
US Billboard Hot 100	13
US Billboard Adult Contemporary	13
US Cash Box Top 100	13

=== Year-end charts ===
Chart (1978)	Rank
Canada RPM Top Singles	97
US (Joel Whitburn's Pop Annual)	97

== Gene Page cover ==
In 1977, Gene Page recorded a disco version of "Close Encounters of the Third Kind". His version peaked on the R&B chart at #30 in 1978.
