= Star Wars (soundtrack) =

1977 soundtrack album by John Williams

Star Wars (Original Motion Picture Soundtrack)
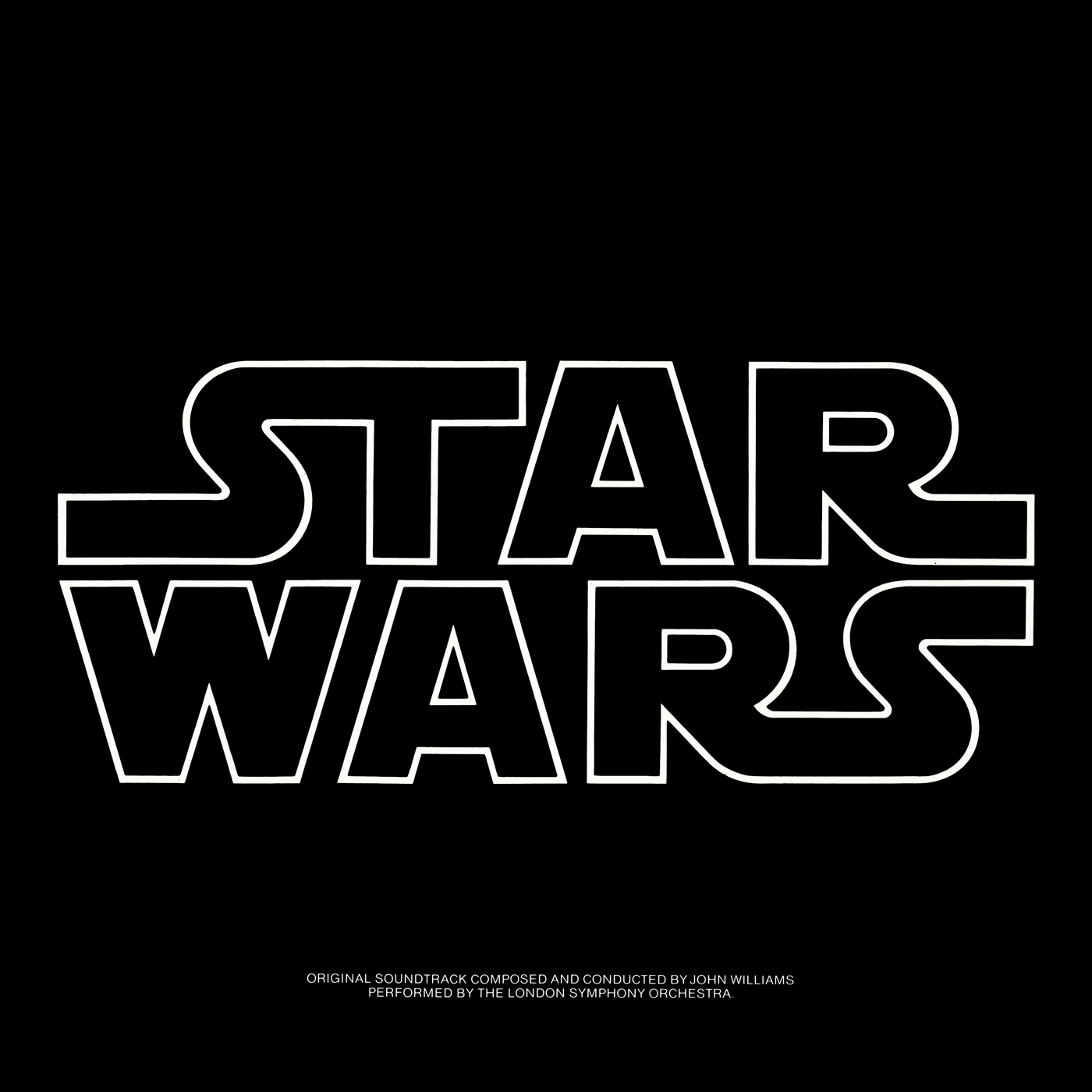
- Cover of the original 1977 release

Soundtrack album by John Williams
- Released: June 1977
- Recorded: March 5–16, 1977
- Studios: Anvil Studios, Denham
- Genres: Classical; contemporary classical music; film score
- Length: 74:58
- Label: 20th Century
- Producers: John Williams; George Lucas

John Williams chronology
Black Sunday (1977)	Star Wars (Original Motion Picture Soundtrack) (1977)	Close Encounters of the Third Kind (1977)

Professional ratings
Review scores
Source	Rating
AllMusic	4.5/5 stars
Filmtracks	5/5 stars
Movie Wave	5/5 stars
SoundtrackNet	5/5 stars

Star Wars (Original Motion Picture Soundtrack) is the soundtrack album to the 1977 film Star Wars, composed and conducted by John Williams and performed by the London Symphony Orchestra. Williams' score for Star Wars was recorded over eight sessions at Anvil Studios in Denham, England on March 5, 8–12, 15 and 16, 1977. The score was orchestrated by Williams, Herbert W. Spencer, Alexander Courage, Angela Morley, Arthur Morton and Albert Woodbury. Spencer orchestrated the scores for The Empire Strikes Back and Return of the Jedi. The score was recorded by engineer Eric Tomlinson and edited by Kenneth Wannberg, and the scoring sessions were produced by Star Wars director George Lucas and supervised by Lionel Newman, head of 20th Century Fox's music department.

The soundtrack album was released by 20th Century Records as a double-LP record in the United States in June 1977. The album's main title peaked at No. 10 on the Billboard Hot 100, with a disco version of the film's theme by Meco becoming a number one hit single in the United States in October 1977. The soundtrack album itself peaked at No. 2 on the Billboard 200 in September 1977, and became the best-selling symphonic album of all time; it was certified Gold and Platinum by the Recording Industry Association of America, and won numerous accolades including an Academy Award, a Golden Globe Award, a BAFTA Award, and Grammy Awards in the categories of Best Original Score Written for a Motion Picture or a Television Special and Best Instrumental Composition (for the "Main Title"). It was also nominated for the Grammy Award for Album of the Year. In 2004, it was preserved by the Library of Congress into the National Recording Registry, calling it "culturally, historically, or aesthetically significant". In 2005, the American Film Institute named the original Star Wars soundtrack as the most memorable score of all time for an American film.

The Star Wars soundtrack saw subsequent reissues since its initial release. In 2016, the album was re-released by Sony Classical Records on vinyl, CD, and digital formats alongside Williams' other Star Wars soundtracks. The vinyl release is pressed on 180g vinyl and features the original 20th Century Records logo. Unlike all of Sony Classical's previous releases, however, the vinyl version is a remastered version of the original 1977 release, not the Special Edition. Walt Disney Records remastered and reissued the soundtrack on vinyl LP on December 1, 2017, and on CD and digital formats on May 4, 2018.

== Original 1977 release ==
The original 1977 release of the soundtrack, entitled Star Wars - Original Soundtrack, included a poster of a painting by science fiction artist John Berkey, depicting the final battle over the Death Star from the film's end. The album was released as a double LP which was formatted for an autochanger record player; one disc had sides one and four with the other having sides two and three. This allowed a person to stack sides one and two on the player, then flip the stack over for sides three and four, allowing the listener to have over half an hour of uninterrupted music before they needed to flip the discs over.

=== Track listing ===
First release on LP by 20th Century Records. For the original soundtrack, Williams selected 75 minutes of music out of the 88 minute score. To provide musical variety, it did not follow the film's chronological order.

This track listing is also shared by Sony Classical's LP release in 2016, and Walt Disney Records' LP and CD releases in 2017 and 2018, respectively.

Side one
No.	Title	Length
1.	"Main Title"	5:20
2.	"Imperial Attack"	6:10
3.	"Princess Leia's Theme"	4:18
4.	"The Desert and the Robot Auction"	2:51

Side two
No.	Title	Length
5.	"Ben's Death and TIE Fighter Attack"	3:46
6.	"The Little People Work"	4:02
7.	"Rescue of the Princess"	4:46
8.	"Inner City"	4:12
9.	"Cantina Band"	2:44

Side three
No.	Title	Length
10.	"The Land of the Sandpeople"	2:50
11.	"Mouse Robot and Blasting Off"	4:01
12.	"The Return Home"	2:46
13.	"The Walls Converge"	4:31
14.	"The Princess Appears"	4:04

Side four
No.	Title	Length
15.	"The Last Battle"	12:05
16.	"The Throne Room and End Title"	5:28
Total length:		74:58

=== Personnel ===
- 1st Violins: Neville Taweel (Leader), Richard Studt (Principal), Irvine Arditti (Principal), Brian Thomas (Sub-Principal), Stanley Castle, Sydney Colter, Dennis Gaines, Charles Beldom, Robert Retallick, C. Reuben, Norman Freeman, Max Weber, Robin Brightman, Brian Gaulton
- 2nd Violins: Warwick Hill (Principal), Neil Watson (Co-Principal), Samuel Artis, William Brown, Thomas Cook, Terry Morton, Jack Steadman, Donald Stewart, Thomas Swift, David Williams, R. Clark, Geoffrey Creese, D. Llewellyn, Harry Nathan
- Violas: Alexander Taylor (Principal), Brian Clarke (Co-Principal), Peter Norriss (Sub-Principal), Patrick Hooley, Michael Mitchell, David Hume, William Sumpton, Patrick Vermont, William Krasnik, Eric Cuthbertson
- Cellos: Douglas Cummings (Principal), Maurice Meulien (Co-Principal), Ray Adams (Sub-Principal), Jack Long, Ken Law, Douglas Powrie, Francis Saunders, Clive Gillinson, Tom Storer, K. Glossop
- Double Basses: Bruce Mollinson (Principal), Arthur Griffiths (Sub-Principal), John Cooper, Gerald Newson, Pashanko Dimitroff, Goelson Neal
- Flutes: Richard Taylor (Principal), Lowry Sanders, Francis Nolan
- Oboes: Roger Lord (Principal), Anthony Camden (Principal)
- Clarinets: Jack Brymer (Principal), Ronald Moore, Roy Jowitt
- Bassoons: Robert Bourton (Principal), Peter Francis
- Horns: David Cripps (Principal), John Rooke (Asst. Principal), Anthony Chidell, Graham Warren, James Quaife, James Brown, S. Reading, J. Butterworth, Terry Johns
- Trumpets: Maurice Murphy (Principal), William Lang, Norman Archibald, R. Izen
- Trombones: Denis Wick (Principal), Eric Crees (Principal), Frank Mathison
- Tuba: J. Fletcher (Principal), Steven Wick
- Timpani: Kurt-Hans Goedicke (Principal)
- Percussion: Michael Frye (Principal), Ray Northcott
- Harp: Renata Sheffel-Stein (Principal), J. Marson
- Piano/Celesta: Robert Noble (Principal), M. Round

== Subsequent releases ==
=== Release history ===
Title	U.S. release date	Label	Format
Star Wars–Original Soundtrack	June 1977	20th Century	Double-LP
Star Wars–Original Soundtrack	1986	Polydor	CD
Star Wars Trilogy: The Original Soundtrack Anthology	1993	Arista	CD
Star Wars: Episode IV A New Hope Special Edition: Original Motion Picture Soundtrack	1997	RCA Victor	Double CD
Star Wars Episode IV: A New Hope (Original Motion Picture Soundtrack)	2004	Sony Classical	Double CD
The Music of Star Wars: 30th Anniversary Collector's Edition	November 6, 2007	Sony Classical	CD
Star Wars: The Ultimate Soundtrack Collection	January 8, 2016	Sony Classical	CD, LP, digital
Star Wars: A New Hope–40th Anniversary Box Set	December 1, 2017	Walt Disney	Remastered 3-LP
Star Wars: A New Hope (Original Motion Picture Soundtrack)	May 4, 2018	Walt Disney	Remastered CD, digital

=== 1986 release ===
First release on CD by Polydor Records in 1986. It is identical in content and packaging to the LP release.

Disc one

1. "Main Title" – 5:21
2. "Imperial Attack" – 6:16
3. "Princess Leia's Theme" – 4:22
4. "The Desert and the Robot Auction" – 2:52
5. "Ben's Death and TIE Fighter Attack" – 3:46
6. "The Little People Work" – 4:01
7. "Rescue of the Princess" – 4:46
8. "Inner City" – 4:13
9. "Cantina Band" – 2:45

Disc two

1. "The Land of the Sandpeople" – 2:49
2. "Mouse Robot and Blasting Off" – 4:01
3. "The Return Home" – 2:45
4. "The Walls Converge" – 4:32
5. "The Princess Appears" – 4:03
6. "The Last Battle" – 12:06
7. "The Throne Room and End Title" – 5:27

=== Star Wars Trilogy: The Original Soundtrack Anthology ===
Star Wars Trilogy – The Original Soundtrack Anthology: "Star Wars"

Film score by John Williams and the London Symphony Orchestra
- Released: 1993
- Genre: Classical
- Label: Arista
- Producer: Nick Redman

In 1993, 20th Century Fox Film Scores released a four-CD box set containing music from the original Star Wars trilogy. This release marked the first time that the complete contents of the original double-LP releases of the scores from the first two films became available on CD. Disc one in the set was devoted to Star Wars, with further tracks on disc four.

Since every cue is recorded several times, usually with varying orchestral differences, the final decisions on what takes of cues are used and/or how they are edited to create the tracks was decided by the music editor Kenneth Wannberg. In the time between the original LP release and the Anthology's release, this breakdown was lost. Because of this, many takes of cues used on the Anthology are not the same. This is most obvious on the cue "The Throne Room". Also, the tracks were re-arranged to better follow their chronological order in the film.

Disc One
No.	Title	Length
1.	"20th Century Fox Fanfare with CinemaScope Extension"	0:22
2.	"Main Title"	5:23
3.	"Imperial Attack"	6:41
4.	"The Desert/The Robot Auction"	2:51
5.	"The Little People Work"	4:08
6.	"The Princess Appears"	4:06
7.	"The Land of the Sand People"	2:55
8.	"The Return Home"	2:48
9.	"Inner City"	4:44
10.	"Mouse Robot/Blasting Off"	4:03
11.	"Rescue of the Princess"	4:48
12.	"The Walls Converge"	4:33
13.	"Ben's Death/TIE Fighter Attack"	3:51
14.	"Princess Leia's Theme"	4:23
15.	"The Last Battle"	12:13
16.	"The Throne Room/End Title"	5:32
Total length:		1:13:21

Disc Four
No.	Title	Length
1.	"20th Century Fox Fanfare with CinemaScope Extension"	0:22
2.	"Star Wars Main Title" (Alternate)	2:16
4.	"A Hive of Villainy"	2:12
5.	"Destruction of Alderaan"	1:31
10.	"Cantina Band"	2:46
12.	"Cantina Band #2"	3:44
15.	"Standing By"	1:14
Total length:		14:05

The alternate version of the Star Wars Main Title can be heard in the end credits for Star Wars Episode IX: The Rise of Skywalker, and is included in the film's soundtrack.

=== 1997 and 2004 Special Edition reissues ===
The 1997 and 2004 releases include the complete film score, including expanded and unreleased tracks.

Star Wars: Episode IV: A New Hope (Original Motion Picture Soundtrack)

Film score by John Williams
- Released: September 21, 2004
- Recorded: 1977
- Length: 1:45:09
- Label: Sony Classical
- Producers: John Williams; Nick Redman; Michael Matessino

Disc One
No.	Title	Length
1.	"20th Century Fox Fanfare" (Alfred Newman, 1954)	0:22
2.	"Main Title/Rebel Blockade Runner - Medley"	2:14
3.	"Imperial Attack"	6:42
4.	"The Dune Sea of Tatooine/Jawa Sandcrawler - Medley"	5:01
5.	"The Moisture Farm"	2:25
6.	"The Hologram/Binary Sunset - Medley"	4:08
7.	"Landspeeder Search/Attack of the Sand People - Medley"	3:20
8.	"Tales of a Jedi Knight/Learn About the Force - Medley"	4:28
9.	"Burning Homestead"	2:50
10.	"Mos Eisley Spaceport"	2:16
11.	"Cantina Band"	2:46
12.	"Cantina Band #2"	3:54
13.	"Binary Sunset (Alternate) - Medley" (contains hidden track "Star Wars Main Title" [take 19] (complete recording session version; takes 16-20))	16:59
Total length:		57:33

Disc Two
No.	Title	Length
1.	"Princess Leia's Theme"	4:27
2.	"The Millennium Falcon/Imperial Cruiser Pursuit - Medley"	3:51
3.	"Destruction of Alderaan"	1:32
4.	"The Death Star/The Stormtroopers - Medley"	3:35
5.	"Wookiee Prisoner/Detention Block Ambush - Medley"	4:01
6.	"Shootout in the Cell Bay/Dianoga - Medley"	3:48
7.	"The Trash Compactor"	3:06
8.	"The Tractor Beam/Chasm Crossfire - Medley"	5:18
9.	"Ben Kenobi's Death/TIE Fighter Attack"	3:51
10.	"The Battle of Yavin (Launch from the Fourth Moon/X-Wings Draw Fire/Use the Force)"	9:06
11.	"The Throne Room/End Title"	5:37
Total length:		48:16

=== 2017 and 2018 Disney reissues ===
Walt Disney Records reissued the original 1977 soundtrack album in digital formats and streaming services on January 1, 2017, and on LP record on December 1, 2017, to coincide with the film's fortieth anniversary that same year. The LP reissue featured a remastered soundtrack, hand-etched hologram art, and a 48-page book containing production photographs, liner notes, and essays on John Williams and the music of Star Wars.

Disney released a newly remastered edition of the original 1977 album program on CD, digital download, and streaming services on May 4, 2018. This remaster was newly assembled by Shawn Murphy and Skywalker Sound from the highest-quality master tapes available, rather than sourced from the existing 1977 album masters. On these reissues, the final track ("The Throne Room and End Title") is presented at the correct speed and pitch, having been sped up slightly on the original LP, CD, and 2016 Sony releases.

== Compilations and re-recordings (Selection) ==
Music from the score has been recorded again by John Williams and by other conductors, and appears on compilations of his film music.

- 1970s: re-recordings by Charles Gerhardt and the National Philharmonic Orchestra (RCA Red Seal) and by Zubin Mehta and the Los Angeles Philharmonic (London Records, 1978), each with music from Close Encounters of the Third Kind
- 1980: Pops in Space, a compilation by Williams and the Boston Pops (Philips), released to mark his taking over the orchestra
- 1983: The Star Wars Trilogy (Return of the Jedi / The Empire Strikes Back / Star Wars), performed by the Utah Symphony conducted by Varujan Kojian (Varèse Sarabande)
- 1990/2001: John Williams Conducts The Star Wars Trilogy, with Williams conducting the Skywalker Symphony Orchestra (Sony Classical)
- 2020: John Williams in Vienna, recorded live at the Musikverein with Williams conducting the Vienna Philharmonic (Deutsche Grammophon), including a selection from Star Wars

== Accolades ==
- Academy Award for Best Original Score (1977)
- Golden Globe Award for Best Original Score (1977)
- BAFTA Award for Best Film Music (1978)
- Grammy Award for Best Score Soundtrack for Visual Media (1978)
- Grammy Award for Best Instrumental Composition (1978) – for Main Title
- Grammy Award for Best Pop Instrumental Performance (1978)
- Saturn Award for Best Music (1977) – tied with Close Encounters of the Third Kind
- AFI's Greatest American movie score of all time (2005)

== Charts & certifications ==
=== Weekly charts ===
Chart (1977–78)	Peak position
Australia (Kent Music Report)	12
Canada Top Albums/CDs (RPM)	2
New Zealand Albums (RMNZ)	19
Swedish Albums (Sverigetopplistan)	27
UK Albums (Official Charts)	21
US Billboard 200	2

=== Year-end charts ===
Chart (1977)	Position
Canada Top Albums/CDs (RPM)	26
US Billboard 200	64

=== Certifications ===
Region	Certification	Certified units/sales
Australia (ARIA)	Gold	20,000^{^}
United Kingdom (BPI)	Gold	100,000^{^}
United States (RIAA)	Platinum	1,000,000^{^}
^{^} Shipments figures based on certification alone.

== Recording Information ==
=== Cue list ===
- R1P2 Star Wars (March 5, 1977)
- R1P3 Imperial Attack Pt. II (The War*) (March 8, 1977)
- R1P4-R2P1 Imperial Attack (The Escape Hatch*) (March 12, 1977)
- R2P2 The Desert (R1P5-R2P1 Desert Song*) (March 12, 1977)
- R2P2 The Little People (Not Recorded)
- R2P3N The Little People (March 15, 1977)
- R2P3 More Little People (Not Recorded)
- R2P5R More Little People (March 15, 1977)
- R2P4 R-2 (Not Recorded)
- R2P4R R-2 (March 11, 1977)
- R3P1 The Princess Appears (Not Recorded)
- R3P1R The Princess Appears (March 5, 1977)
- R3P2 Lost R2 (Not Recorded)
- R3P2R Lost R2 (March 8, 1977)
- R3P2N (March 15, 1977)
- R3P3 The Sand Speeder (Not Recorded)
- R3P3R The Land of the Sand People (March 11, 1977)
- R3P4-R4P1 The Sandman Attacks (Not Recorded)
- R3P4-R4P1R Land of Sand People Pt. II (March 16, 1977)
- R4P2 Obi-Wan Kenobi (March 9, 1977)
- R4P2A The Force (March 9, 1977)
- R4P3 The Princess Reappears (March 11, 1977)
- R4P4 A Home Destroyed (March 11, 1977)
- R4P4R The Return Home (March 9, 1977)
- R5P1 A Hive of Villainy (Not Recorded)
- R5P1R A Hive of Villainy (March 15, 1977)
- R5P4-R6P1 Monkey Band (R5P3-3A Jolly Jazzers*) (March 10, 1977)
- R5P6 The Inner City (Not Recorded)
- R5P6R The Inner City (March 12, 1977)
- R6P1 Blasting Away (March 16, 1977)
- R6P5N The Destruction of Alderon (March 12, 1977)
- R7P1N Is It a Bird? (R6P3*) (March 5, 1977)
- R7P1 The Hatch Opens (Not Recorded)
- R7P2N The Hatch Opens (March 11, 1977)
- R7P2 The Mouse Robot (March 9, 1977)
- R8P2N More Rescue (March 12, 1977)
- R8P2 The Rescue (Not Recorded)
- R8P2R The Rescue (New Intro) (March 8, 1977)
- R8P3 The Water Snake (Not Recorded)
- R8P3R The Water Snake (March 11, 1977)
- R8P4 The Walls Converge (March 11, 1977)
- R9P1 Ben Creeps Around (March 8, 1977)
- R9P2 The Swashbucklers (March 5, 1977)
- R9P3-R10P1 Ben's Death (March 5, 1977)
- R10P2 The Fighters Attack (Here They Come*) (March 11, 1977)
- R10P3-R11P1 Standing By (Stand By*) (March 12, 1977)
- R11P2 Approaching the Target (Not Recorded)
- R11P2R The Last Battle Pt. II (March 11, 1977)
- R12P1 (March 15, 1977)
- R12P2 The Throne Room and End Title (End Titles*) (March 12, 1977)
- R12P2X (March 16, 1977)
- The Princess Theme (March 8, 1977)

*Original cue number/title before revisions

=== Original recording log ===
The score for Star Wars was recorded over the span of eight days in the month of March 1977. The 1997 Special Edition soundtrack release by RCA Victor included a detailed look at the recording log for all the cues in the film.

Recording Date: March 5, 1977 – Day 1
Recorded Take	Cue Title	Selected Take	Film Order
1-7	Chasm Crossfire	5, 7	31
8-10	The Death Star	10	23
11-15	Ben Kenobi's Death	13, 15	32
16-20	Main Title	18, 19, 20	1
21-23	The Hologram	22	8

Recording Date: March 8, 1977 – Day 2
Recording Take	Cue Title	Selected Take	Film Order
24-27	Shootout In The Cell Bay	26, 27	27
28-40	Princess Leia's Theme	33, 40	N/A
41-50	Imperial Attack (Part 1)	44, 50	2
51-53	The Tractor Beam	53	30
54-55	Binary Sunset (Alternate)	N/A	N/A

Recording Date: March 9, 1977 – Day 3
Recorded Takes	Cue Title	Selected Takes	Film Order
56-58	Learn About The Force (Part 2)	58	15
59-63	Burning Homestead	62, 63	16
64-67	Wookiee Prisoner	67	25
68-72	Learn About The Force (Part 1)	72	14

Recording Date: March 10, 1977 – Day 4
Recorded Takes	Cue Title	Selected Takes	Film Order
73-80	Cantina Band	76	18
81-82	Cantina Band #2	81	19

Recording Date: March 11, 1977 – Day 5
Recorded Takes	Cue Title	Selected Takes	Film Order
83-86	X-Wings Draw Fire	85, 86	35
87-92	Landspeeder Search	92	10
93-94	Tales Of A Jedi Knight (Part 2)	N/A	N/A
95-97	Tie Fighter Attack	95, 97	33
98-105	The Trash Compactor	101, 102	29
106-109	Tales Of A Jedi Knight (Part 2)	109	13
110-114	The Stormtroopers	114	24
115-116	Dianoga	116	28
117-122	Tales Of A Jedi Knight (Part 1)	122	12
123-126	The Moisture Farm (Part 2)	126	7

Recording Date: March 12, 1977 – Day 6
Recorded Takes	Cue Title	Selected Takes	Film Order
127-133	The Throne Room	132, 133	37
134-143	End Title	136, 137, 142, 143	38
144-149	Dune Sea Of Tatooine	149	4
150-154	Detention Block Ambush	153, 154	26
155-162	Launch From The Fourth Moon	162	34
163-167	Imperial Attack (Part 2)	165, 167	3
168-172	Destruction Of Alderaan	172	22
173-175	The Millennium Falcon	175	20

Recording Date: March 15, 1977 – Day 7
Recorded Takes	Cue Title	Selected Takes	Film Order
176-180	Use The Force	178, 180	36
181-185	Mos Eisley Spaceport	184, 185	17
186-188	Jawa Sandcrawler	186, 187, 188	5
189-197	The Moisture Farm (Part 1)	194, 197	6
198-202	Binary Sunset (Revised)	202	9

Recording Date: March 16, 1977 – Day 8
Recorded Takes	Cue Title	Selected Takes	Film Order
203-209	Imperial Cruiser Pursuit	205, 206, 209	21
210-214	Attack Of The Sand People	213, 214	11
215-219	End Title (Crossover)	219	38

== See also ==
- The Story of Star Wars
- Music of Star Wars
