= Tony Bongiovi =

American record producer (born 1947)

- Born: Anthony Carmine Bongiovi Jr. September 7, 1947 (age 79); Raritan, New Jersey, U.S.
- Genres: R&B; disco; hard rock; punk rock; heavy metal; urban
- Occupations: Record producer; recording engineer
- Years active: 1965–present
- Label: Jive
- Website: bongioviacoustics.com

Anthony Carmine Bongiovi Jr. (born September 7, 1947) is an American record producer and recording engineer. He is the cousin of musician Jon Bon Jovi.

== Early life ==
Anthony Carmine Bongiovi Jr. was born on September 7, 1947, in Raritan, New Jersey to Anthony Carmine Bongiovi Sr., an embalmer, and Frances Miriam Pellicane. He is of Italian descent.

== Career ==
=== Early career ===
In 1964, at the age of 17, while a student attending Bridgewater-Raritan High School West, Bongiovi became interested in recording studios, and visited Bell Sound and Regent Sound in New York City, where he overheard engineers speculating about how Motown achieved the sound of their recordings. Determined to figure out what made the Motown recordings sound different, Bongiovi ended up determining that the reverb decay on Motown recordings was much shorter than recordings produced in other studios, and he was able to primitively apply this re-created effect to songs produced in New York to make them sound more Motown-like. Bongiovi attempted to present his findings to an engineer at Columbia's studio, but the engineer wasn't interested. With encouragement from Jim Czak at Bell Sound, Bongiovi called Motown's chief engineer, Mike McLean, who arranged for Bongiovi to meet Motown producer Lawrence Horn in New York City. Horn, upon hearing Bongiovi's findings, asked 17-year-old Bongiovi whether he wanted to come to Detroit and visit Motown. His initial 4-day visit to the label's Hitsville U.S.A. studios in Detroit was the first of many that gave Bongiovi the opportunity to work with such artists as Stevie Wonder, Marvin Gaye, and The Supremes.

Bongiovi returned home with a temporary Hitsville, U.S.A. ID card, which he used to secure job offers from numerous New York recording studios, accepting a job at the newly-opened Apostolic Recording Studio, New York City's first 12-track recording facility. At Apostolic, Bongiovi worked with Frank Zappa and The Mothers of Invention and producer Shadow Morton.

In 1968, Bongiovi left Apostolic Studios and was hired by Gary Kellegren to work at the just-opened Record Plant, where he worked nights with Jimi Hendrix during the recording of Electric Ladyland. He also worked with Alan Douglas on some of Hendrix's posthumous releases. Later, he worked with the songwriting and production team Holland–Dozier–Holland for Chairmen of the Board's "Give Me Just a Little More Time" and Freda Payne's "Band of Gold", and received engineering credit on Vanilla Fudge's 1969 album, Near the Beginning, but the studio's co-founder Chris Stone fired him.

Bongiovi went to work at Mediasound Studios, where he mixed Woodstock: Music from the Original Soundtrack and More. He also formed the Disco Corporation of America production company with Meco Menardo and was part of the production team responsible for Gloria Gaynor's 1974 hit "Never Can Say Goodbye" and 1977's platinum-selling Star Wars and Other Galactic Funk. He was approached by former Record Plant co-worker Tommy Ramone to produce the Ramones, and Bongiovi co-produced the band's second and third albums at Sundragon Studios. He also co-produced the Talking Heads album 77 at Sundragon.

=== Power Station ===
Now earning significant production royalties, Bongiovi decided to build his own recording studios. Partnering with former Mediasound co-worker Bob Walters and hiring a team that included engineer Ed Stasium, Ed Evans, and Bob Clearmountain, they found an abandoned building at 441 West 53rd Street in New York City's Hell's Kitchen neighborhood, which Bongiovi purchased from New York City in 1977 for $360,000 as part of a building rehabilitation program. Bongiovi, Walters, and their team worked with Stephen B. Jacobs Associates to design a studio that would apply Bongiovi's ideas regarding acoustics. The new studio was named Power Station in acknowledgment of the building's origins as a former Consolidated Edison power station.

In 1992, the studio was put in Chapter 11 bankruptcy, and sold to Chieko and Kirk Imamura, who re-named it Avatar Studios to ensure that Bongiovi could continue to receive Power Station production royalties.

Bongiovi moved to Florida, where he did sound design consulting for Universal Studios Florida before returning to New York, where he continued studio work.

In 2012, Bongiovi helped open Power Station Studios in Pompano Beach, Florida. He is also Managing Director and co-founder of Bongiovi Acoustic Labs, headquartered in Port St. Lucie, Florida. Here he has developed a suite of algorithms called Bongiovi Acoustic Labs DPS (Digital Power Station), enabling engineers to produce recordings with studio-like sound.

== Personal life ==
He is a second cousin of Jon Bon Jovi, who is the lead singer of the band Bon Jovi.

== Production and engineering credits ==
- 1972: Hypnotized - Martha Veléz
- 1975: Never Can Say Goodbye - Gloria Gaynor
- 1975: Crash Landing - Jimi Hendrix
- 1975: Midnight Lightning - Jimi Hendrix
- 1975: Are You Ready For Freddy? - Freddy Fender
- 1975: Experience Gloria Gaynor - Gloria Gaynor
- 1976: I've Got You - Gloria Gaynor
- 1977: Leave Home - The Ramones
- 1977: Rocket to Russia - The Ramones
- 1977: Talking Heads '77 - Talking Heads
- 1977: Tailgunner - Jimmy McGriff (recording and remix engineer)
- 1977: Star Wars and Other Galactic Funk - Meco
- 1978: Encounters of Every Kind - Meco
- 1978: Tuff Darts! - Tuff Darts
- 1978: Can't Stand the Rezillos - The Rezillos
- 1978: Ace Frehley - Ace Frehley
- 1979: This Is My Life (La Vita) with Meco - Shirley Bassey
- 1980: Christmas in the Stars: Star Wars Christmas Album - Meco
- 1980: 1978-80: 1978-1980 Six Singles - Al Downing
- 1980: The Empire Strikes Back - Meco
- 1981: Balance - Balance
- 1982: I'll Be Loving You - Al Downing
- 1982: Darlene - Al Downing
- 1982: Big Al Downing - Al Downing
- 1982: Rock in a Hard Place - Aerosmith
- 1982. Aldo Nova - Aldo Nova
- 1982: In for the Count - Balance
- 1983: Bark at the Moon - Ozzy Osbourne
- 1983: No Rest for the Wicked - Helix
- 1983: Superstar - Lydia Murdock
- 1984: Bon Jovi - Bon Jovi
- 1984: Love on the Line - Lydia Murdock
- 1990: Back for Another Taste - Helix - co-producer
- 2005: Boo! B***h - Mystery - co producer with Steven Gagnon
- 2002: Sympathy - Goo Goo Dolls
- 2005: As Above So Below - NoEnd

== Others produced ==
- Jodi Bongiovi
- Cidny Bullens
- Carlene Carter
- Rick Derringer
- Mike DeVille
- Buck Dharma
- Carol Douglas
- The Electriks
- Barry Goudreau
- Gus & The New Breed
- Millie Jackson
- The Rezillos
- Sylvain Sylvain
- Tuff Darts
- Samantha Sang
- Marlena Shaw
