= Harold Wheeler (musician) =

American orchestrator, arranger and music director (1943–2026)

- Born: William Harold Wheeler Jr. July 14, 1943; St. Louis, Missouri, U.S.
- Died: June 24, 2026 (aged 82)
- Occupations: Orchestrator; Conductor; Pianist; Composer; Record producer; Music director
- Instrument: Piano
- Label: RCA Victor
- Formerly of: The Harold Wheeler Consort

William Harold Wheeler Jr. (July 14, 1943 – June 24, 2026) was an American orchestrator, composer, conductor, arranger, record producer and music director. He received numerous Tony Award and Drama Desk Award nominations for orchestration, and won the Drama Desk Award for Outstanding Orchestrations for Hairspray in 2003.

== Career ==
Wheeler first worked in the 1960s as the musical director for Burt Bacharach, making him the first African-American MD of a major pop artist. He also did arranging for Tony Orlando and Nina Simone during that time. In 2004, he served as music conductor for the 76th Academy Awards, becoming only the second African-American conductor in the award show's history. He also was a music arranger on the 79th Academy Awards in 2007. Wheeler was one of two conductors (the others being fellow composers John Williams and Paul Shaffer) during the opening and closing ceremonies of the 1996 Summer Olympics.

He was the musical director on ABC's Dancing with the Stars for the show's first 17 seasons. He was replaced by former American Idol bandleader Ray Chew as musical director starting with the show's 18th season in 2014.

== Personal life and death ==
Wheeler was born in St Louis, Missouri on July 14, 1943. He attended Howard University, where he met actress Hattie Winston, they were married and had a daughter. He died on June 24, 2026, at the age of 82.

== Awards ==
In 2008, he received a Lifetime Achievement Award from the NAACP Theatre Awards. In 2019, he received a Special Tony Award for Lifetime Achievement in the Theater.

== Stage ==
- Promises, Promises (1968) – Musical director, dance arrangements
- Coco (1969) – Dance arrangements
- Ain't Supposed to Die a Natural Death (1971) – Musical direction and supervision
- Two Gentlemen of Verona (1971) – Musical supervisor
- Don't Play Us Cheap! (1972) – Musical supervisor
- Love For Love (1974) – Featured songs
- The Wiz (1975) – Music orchestrations
- Lena Horne: The Lady and Her Music (1981) – Musical director
- Dreamgirls (1981) – Musical supervisor, music orchestrator
- Little Me (1982) – Music orchestrations
- The Tap Dance Kid (1983) – Musical supervisor, music arranger, vocal arrangements
- The Wiz (1984) – Music orchestrations
- The Three Musketeers (1984) – Additional orchestrations
- Leader of the Pack (1985) – Opening dance sequence composer and orchestrations
- Grind (1985) – Additional orchestrations
- Dreamgirls (1987) – Musical supervisor, music orchestrations
- Carrie (1988) – Musical supervisor, music orchestrations
- Tommy Tune Tonite! (1992) – Arrangements and orchestrations
- The Life (1997) – Music orchestrations
- Side Show (1997) – Music orchestrations
- Little Me (1998) – Music orchestrations
- Swing! (1999) – Music orchestrations
- The Full Monty (2000) – Music orchestrations
- Hairspray (2002) – Music orchestrations
- Never Gonna Dance (2003) – Music orchestrations
- Dirty Rotten Scoundrels (2005) – Music orchestrations
- Lennon (2005) – Music orchestrations
- Hugh Jackman: Back on Broadway (2011) – Arrangements and orchestrations
- Side Show (2014) – Music orchestrations
- Ain't Too Proud (2019) – Music orchestrations

== Partial discography ==
- Nina Simone – Here Comes the Sun (1971) – Arranger, conductor and producer
- Bruce Springsteen – Greetings from Asbury Park, N.J. (1973) – Piano on "Blinded by the Light" and "Spirit in the Night"
- Grind (1985) – Additional orchestrations
- The Harold Wheeler Consort – Black Cream (1975) RCA BGL1-0849 – Producer, arranger, piano/keyboards/organ/Moog, composer credit for tracks "Black Cream" and "Color Me Soul"
- Meco – Star Wars and Other Galactic Funk (1977) – Arranger and producer
- The Wiz (1978) – Soundtrack
- Straight Out of Brooklyn (1991) – Original music
- The Jacksons: An American Dream (1992) – Original score
- Mississippi Rising (2005) – Arranger and conductor

=== As sideman ===
With Bernard Purdie

- Purdie Good! (Prestige, 1971)
- Stand by Me (Whatcha See Is Whatcha Get) (Mega, 1971)
