= Meco =

American record producer and musician (1939–2023)

- Born: Domenico Monardo; November 29, 1939; Johnsonburg, Pennsylvania, U.S.
- Died: May 26, 2023 (aged 83) Tamarac, Florida, U.S.
- Genres: Space disco, disco, funk, easy listening
- Occupations: Musician, music arranger, record producer
- Instrument: Trombone
- Years active: 1965–1985
- Labels: Millennium Records, Casablanca Records, RCA Records, Hip-O/MCA Records

Domenico Monardo (November 29, 1939 – May 26, 2023), known as Meco, was an American record producer and musician, as well as the name of his band or production team. Meco is best known for his 1977 space disco version of the Star Wars theme from his album Star Wars and Other Galactic Funk; both the single and album were certified platinum in the US.

== Early life and education ==
Meco Monardo was born in Johnsonburg, Pennsylvania, United States, on November 29, 1939 to parents of Italian descent. Building model ships, science fiction and movies were some of his boyhood preoccupations. His father played the valve trombone in a small Italian band, and through him Meco got his first musical education. Meco wanted to play the drums, but his father convinced him that the trombone was the right instrument, and at nine that was the instrument with which he was to stay. However, for Meco, the slide trombone was his choice, troublesome as it was for the small-statured boy to extend the slide fully at first. He joined the high school band while still attending elementary school. At 17, he won a scholarship to the Eastman School of Music in Rochester, New York, which provided him with a solid classical and jazz music education.

== Career ==
While at Eastman School of Music, together with his two friends Chuck Mangione and Ron Carter, he started the Eastman School of Music jazz band. When he enrolled at West Point, he also played in the Cadet Band.

After serving in the US Army, Meco moved to New York City and joined Kai Winding's four-trombone band, and then from 1965 to 1974 he went on as a studio musician. Originally not inclined toward pop music, Meco's heart changed when he heard Petula Clark's "Downtown." He began arranging for musicians, for example the horn section on Tommy James' "Crystal Blue Persuasion" and the Neil Diamond series of Coca-Cola commercials.

In 1978, he recorded his fourth album, Superman and Other Galactic Heroes, in a series of film-inspired disco records. It was the first Meco record to be released on parent Casablanca Records, and again features orchestral arrangements by Harold Wheeler. As with his previous records, Meco sticks pretty closely to the formula he established with the popular Star Wars and Other Galactic Funk. Side One consists of a 16-minute disco arrangement of the themes from the film Superman: The Movie (1978), while Side Two contains four original compositions by Harold Wheeler. A single edit from the first side was released ("Can You Read My Mind"), but wasn't a hit.

As a session musician he played the trombone with acts like Tommy James, Diana Ross, and David Barretto. Although Meco focused on producing in the late 1970s, he contracted the horns and performed on Diana Ross' 1980 album Diana as a favor to producer (and neighbor) Nile Rodgers. His solo on the single "I'm Coming Out" is notable because of the rarity of trombone features on post-big-band era pop records.

Around 1973, Meco and Tony Bongiovi were part of a trio that formed the production company Disco Corporation of America. From 1974 to 1976, Meco worked as a record producer. The team of Meco, Bongiovi, Jay Ellis, and Harold Wheeler produced the 1974 Gloria Gaynor hit "Never Can Say Goodbye." Carol Douglas' "Doctor's Orders" was among the other productions of that period.

=== Star Wars theme ===
On the picture's opening day, Wednesday, May 25, 1977, Meco attended the 20th Century-Fox soon-to-be blockbuster hit Star Wars. By the following night, he had seen the film four more times, and attended several more screenings over the weekend.

Meco then got the idea to make a disco version of the score by John Williams and contacted Neil Bogart at Casablanca Records to pitch the project. However, rather than greenlighting the project right away, Bogart chose to wait. Only after both the picture itself as well as the original score had become huge hits did Bogart agree to help Meco realize his idea. Contact was established with Millennium Records, then a Casablanca subsidiary, and this became Meco's first record company. Here Meco rejoined with Tony Bongiovi as well as Harold Wheeler who had also been part of the team behind "Never Can Say Goodbye" in 1974. Lance Quinn was also part of the Meco team, and the different roles played by the four musicians is described by Meco himself in a 1999 interview with his fan Web site:

Tony and Lance are the two guys who would not let me be "too musical". Tony would say: "It's not dumb enough—It's too good." Tony is a frustrated drummer and Lance is a guitar genius, so they would make sure the rhythm section was always "smoking" under the very sophisticated arrangements and concepts that Harold and I started with.

In a matter of just three weeks they arranged and recorded Star Wars and Other Galactic Funk. Although the album was nominated for "Best Pop Instrumental Performance" at the 20th Annual Grammy Awards in 1978, the award ultimately went to John Williams for the original soundtrack album.

=== The band Meco ===
For a period of four months there was even a show band assembled to perform to Meco's disco music in public venues. However, the band was not involved in the making of the music. This initiative was organized by Norby Walters, a booking agent for discos. The band members toured the U.S. and Canada as a high energy show band called Lemon Tree. Norby Walters booked and also managed the band before the Star Wars project. Band personnel was Carmine Giovinazzo, Stan Glogicheski, Tommy Rocco, Tony Abruzzo, and Tony "Butch" Gerace.

=== Other soundtracks become "Meco-ized" ===
In the fall of 1977, Meco's second album was released. It was another rearranged science-fiction movie soundtrack, Encounters of Every Kind, based on John Williams music of the movie Close Encounters of the Third Kind, from which three singles were released: "Topsy," "Meco's Theme," and "Theme from 'Close Encounters.'"

Meco's third album came in early 1978, and this time it was the music from The Wizard of Oz, which got transformed into a disco album by the same name, as Meco described: "It is my best work, bar none." From this album came the hit single "Themes from The Wizard of Oz: 'Over the Rainbow'/'We're Off to See the Wizard.'"

In the fall of 1978, Millennium merged with RCA. Since he had developed a deep-bonded working relationship with Neil Bogart and other staff at Casablanca Records (Millennium and Casablanca having cooperated closely), Meco decided to move to Casablanca. Casablanca released the fourth Meco album, Superman and Other Galactic Heroes, featuring two hit singles, "Superman Theme" and "Love Theme From Superman." This was yet another Meco makeover of an original John Williams score.

In 1979, the fifth album, Moondancer, was released, and with it the hit singles "Moondancer," "Grazing in the Grass," and "Devil's Delight." In 1980, Meco's sixth album, Music from Star Trek and Music from the Black Hole, was released, featuring the song "Theme from 'Star Trek.'" The movie Star Trek: The Motion Picture (1979) featured an original soundtrack composed by Jerry Goldsmith. Meco also created Meco Plays Music from The Empire Strikes Back, which was a 10" EP containing a mash-up of various themes from the John Williams score to The Empire Strikes Back for RSO Records.

The last album that Meco made for Casablanca, his seventh, which came out in 1981, was Impressions of An American Werewolf in London, based on the soundtrack from the 1981 feature film An American Werewolf in London. After this LP, Meco's tenure with Casablanca was over.

Meco also recorded for RSO Records (Empire Strikes Back and Christmas in the Stars) as well as Arista Records (Ewok Celebration, Pop Goes the Movies, Swingtime's Greatest Hits) and on Columbia with the single The Raiders March. His Hooked on Instrumentals was released on CD and Cassette on the K-Tel label in the US, and PolyGram Special Markets released a CD compilation of his greatest hits, The Best of Meco, in 1997.

=== Retirement from music ===
According to Meco, "When disco was new, it was fresh and exciting because it was different. But pretty soon it became too cookie-cutter and wore itself out." He left the music industry in 1985.

Meco died at his home in Tamarac, Florida on May 26, 2023, at the age of 83.

== Discography ==
=== Albums ===
- Star Wars and Other Galactic Funk (Millennium, 1977)
- Encounters of Every Kind (Millennium, 1977)
- Meco Plays The Wizard of Oz (Millennium, 1978)
- Superman And Other Galactic Heroes (Casablanca, 1978)
- Moondancer (Casablanca, 1979)
- Meco Plays Music from the Empire Strikes Back (1980)
- Christmas in the Stars: Star Wars Christmas Album (RSO, 1980)
- Music from Star Trek and Music from the Black Hole (Casablanca, 1980)
- Across The Galaxy (RCA, 1980)
- Impressions of An American Werewolf in London (Casablanca, 1981)
- Pop Goes the Movies (Arista, 1982)
- Swingtime's Greatest Hits (Arista, 1982)
- Ewok Celebration (Arista 1983)
- Hooked on Instrumentals (with Harold Wheeler) (1983)
- The Best of Meco (Casablanca, 1997)
- Dance Your Asteroids Off: The Complete Star Wars Collection (Mecoman Music, 2000)
- Star Wars Party (2005) (This release is only sold on the Internet, a retail release with identical musical content was released as Music Inspired by "Star Wars")
- Meco Presents Camouflage / Showdown (2010) (Two LPs reissued together on one CD, both originally released in 1977 on Honey Bee Records.)

=== Singles ===
==== Charted singles ====
Year	Song title	Artist credit	Peak chart positions						
Year	Song title	Artist credit	US	US AC	US Disco Action	AUS	CAN	CAN AC	UK
1977	"Star Wars Theme/Cantina Band"	Meco	1	18	6	3	1	1	7
1978	"Theme from Close Encounters"	Meco	25	30	33	76	24	24	―
1978	"Themes from The Wizard of Oz: Over the Rainbow/We're Off to See the Wizard"	Meco	35	35	35	―	29	11	―
1980	"Empire Strikes Back (Medley)"	Meco	18	―	―	68	23	―	―
1980	"Love Theme from Shogun (Mariko's Theme)"	Meco	70	―	―	―	―	―	―
1980	"What Can You Get a Wookiee for Christmas (When He Already Owns a Comb?)"	The Star Wars Intergalactic Droid Choir & Chorale	69	―	―	―	―	―	―
1981	"Summer of 81"	The Cantina Band	81	―	―	―	―	―	―
1981	"Blue Moon"	Meco	106	―	―	―	―	―	―
1982	"Pop Goes the Movies Part I"	Meco	35	17	―	100	―	―	―
1982	"Big Band Melody"	Meco	101	18	―	―	―	―	―
1983	"Ewok Celebration"	Meco	60	―	―	―	―	―	―
"—" denotes releases that did not chart or were not released in that territory.

==== Additional singles ====
- "Topsy" / "Lady Marion" (1977)
- "Crazy Rhythm" / "Hot in the Saddle" (Mexico promo release)
- "Main Title Theme from Superman" / "Love Theme from Superman (Can You Read My Mind?)" (1979)
- "Moondancer" (US 12-inch promo) (1979)
- "Devil Delight" / "Grazing in te Grass" (1979)
- "Theme from Star Trek" / "Clearmotion" (1980)
- "Christmas in the Stars" / "Sleigh Ride" (1980)
- "Moondance" / "Blue Moon" (1981)
- "The Raiders March" (from the Motion Picture "Raiders of the Lost Ark") / "Cairo Nights" (1981)
- "Anything Goes" / "Music Makers" (1984)

== Bibliography ==
- Whitburn, Joel. Joel Whitburn presents Billboard Hot 100 Charts: The Seventies and The Eighties. Menomonee Falls, Wisconsin: Record Research Inc., 1991.
