= Disco (Grace Jones album) =

Box set by Grace Jones
- Released: May 4, 2015
- Recorded: 1977–1979
- Genre: Disco
- Length: 227:13
- Labels: Island, Universal Music Group
- Producer: Tom Moulton

Grace Jones chronology
Hurricane (2008)	Disco (2015)

Professional ratings
Review scores
Source	Rating
AllMusic	3.5/5 stars
The List	4/5 discs
Louder Than War	4/10
The Quietus	Favorable

Disco is a boxed set of Grace Jones's first three albums, released in 2015. The set contains Portfolio (1977), Fame (1978), and Muse (1979), all of which were recorded at Philadelphia's Sigma Sound Studios with disco pioneer Tom Moulton as producer, in their entirety. The albums were remastered and each of the three CDs included seven bonus tracks while the vinyl box maintains the original track listings and offers a fourth record, that collects mainly long versions of the 45s from this era. The LP version includes the original 3 LP releases and a 4th LP which includes 8 tracks with selected remixes, b-sides and edited versions.

== Track listing ==
Portfolio (1977)
No.	Title	Writer(s)	Length
1.	"Send in the Clowns"	Stephen Sondheim	7:37
2.	"What I Did for Love"	Marvin Hamlisch; Edward Kleban	5:15
3.	"Tomorrow"	Martin Charnin; Charles Strouse	5:48
4.	"La Vie en rose"	Édith Piaf; Louis Guglielmi	7:28
5.	"Sorry"	Grace Jones; Pierre Papadiamandis	3:58
6.	"That's the Trouble"	Jones; Papadiamandis	3:36
7.	"I Need a Man"	Papadiamandis; Paul Slade	3:23
8.	"Sorry" (long version)	Jones; Papadiamandis	6:45
9.	"That's the Trouble" (long version)	Jones; Papadiamandis	7:01
10.	"I Need a Man" (long version)	Papadiamandis; Slade	7:37
11.	"I Need a Man" (instrumental version)	Papadiamandis; Slade	4:57
12.	"Sorry" (instrumental version)	Jones; Papadiamandis	4:47
13.	"That's the Trouble" (instrumental version)	Jones; Papadiamandis	3:53
14.	"La Vie en Rose" (instrumental version)	Piaf; Guglielmi	7:26
Total length:			79:33

Fame (1978)
No.	Title	Writer(s)	Length
1.	"Do or Die"	Jack Robinson; James Bolden	6:43
2.	"Pride"	Robinson; Bolden	6:27
3.	"Fame"	Robinson; Gil Slavin	5:35
4.	"Autumn Leaves"	Jacques Prévert; Johnny Mercer; Joseph Kosma	7:03
5.	"All on a Summers Night"	Robinson; Bolden	4:18
6.	"Am I Ever Gonna Fall in Love in New York City"	Robinson; Vivienne Savoie Robinson; Bolden	5:26
7.	"Below the Belt"	Jones; Papadiamandis	4:55
8.	"Do or Die" (12" disco version)	Robinson; Bolden	6:16
9.	"Comme un oiseau qui s'envole" (long version)	Jean-Claude Cosson; Slavin	4:31
10.	"Anema e core" (long version)	Tito Manlio; Salve D'Esposito	5:04
11.	"Do or Die" (instrumental version)	Robinson; Bolden	6:24
12.	"Comme un oiseau qui s'envole" (instrumental version)	Cosson; Slavin	4:32
13.	"Am I Ever Gonna Fall in Love in New York City" (instrumental version)	Robinson; V. Robinson; Bolden	5:30
14.	"Anema e core" (instrumental version)	Manlio; D'Esposito	4:31
Total length:			77:05

Muse (1979)
No.	Title	Writer(s)	Length
1.	"Sinning"	Jones; Papadiamandis	5:07
2.	"Suffer"	Tom Moulton; Thor Baldursson	4:15
3.	"Repentance (Forgive Me)"	Jones; Papadiamandis	3:51
4.	"Saved"	Robinson; Bolden; V. Robinson	7:09
5.	"Atlantic City Gambler"	Moulton; Duke Williams	5:48
6.	"I'll Find My Way to You"	Stelvio Cipriani; Hal Shaper	5:16
7.	"Don't Mess with the Messer"	Jones; Papadiamandis	4:51
8.	"On Your Knees"	D.C. LaRue; Jerry Corbetta	6:30
9.	"Don't Mess with the Messer" (long version)	Jones; Papadiamandis	6:33
10.	"La Vie en Rose" (short version)	Piaf; Guglielmi	3:36
11.	"Do or Die" (short version)	Robinson; Bolden	3:24
12.	"Comme Un Oiseau Qui S’Envole" (short version)	Cosson; Slavin	3:10
13.	"Am I Ever Gonna Fall in Love in New York City" (short version)	Robinson; V. Robinson; Bolden	3:33
14.	"On Your Knees" (edit)	LaRue; Corbetta	3:43
15.	"Don’t Mess With The Messer" (edit)	Jones; Papadiamandis	4:10
Total length:			70:58

== Charts ==
Chart (2015)	Peak position
Belgian Albums (Ultratop Wallonia)	132
UK Albums (Official Charts)	99
UK Albums Sales Chart (OCC)	72
UK Physical Albums Chart (OCC)	48
