= Muse (Grace Jones album) =

Studio album by Grace Jones
- Released: September 4, 1979
- Recorded: 1976–1979
- Studios: Sigma Sound, Philadelphia, Pennsylvania
- Genre: Disco
- Length: 42:36
- Label: Island
- Producer: Tom Moulton

Grace Jones chronology
| Fame (1978) | Muse (1979) | Warm Leatherette (1980) |

Singles from Muse
- 1. "On Your Knees" Released: August 1979

Muse is the third studio album by Jamaican singer and songwriter Grace Jones, released on September 4, 1979, by Island Records.

== Production and release ==
Muse was the last album of Jones's disco trilogy recorded with producer Tom Moulton, which began in 1977 with debut Portfolio. As in the case of two previous records, the first side of the album is a continuous medley of four songs, joined by a narrative about someone who has sinned. The second side, however, consists of disco songs with no lyrical relation to one another. All album art, including the cover image, is by Richard Bernstein.

The album features a re-recorded version "I'll Find My Way to You", which Jones released three years prior to Muse. It was originally featured in a 1976 Italian movie Quelli della calibro 38 (international title: Colt 38 Special Squad) in which she played a club singer. The original version along with a song called "Again and Again" were included on a single produced by composer Stelvio Cipriani.

Icelandic keyboardist Thor Baldursson who arranged most of the album and also sang duet with Grace on the track "Suffer" had previously worked in Munich, Germany with disco stars such as Silver Convention, Boney M., Donna Summer, Amanda Lear, and Giorgio Moroder.

Muse was released in the year of the "anti-disco backlash" and both the album and its sole single, "On Your Knees", were largely overlooked by the record buying public at the time. It is generally believed to be Grace Jones' "lost album". Muse remains her lowest-charting studio album in the United States and the only studio album not to produce any charting single. For many years, Muse was the only Grace Jones studio album that had not been re-released on CD. Gold Legion, a record company that specializes in re-issuing classic disco albums on CD, finally released it on the format in November 2011, remastered, but with no bonus tracks. It was first released on CD in the UK in 2015, along with Portfolio and Fame, as part of the Disco boxed set of Jones' first three "disco" era albums.

== Singles ==
The original version of "I'll Find My Way to You" was released on a single with "Again and Again" as the B-side in 1976 and promoted an Italian movie Quelli della calibro 38 (Colt 38 Special Squad). The song did not chart.

The first, and internationally the only single promoting Muse, was "On Your Knees", released shortly before album's premiere. The single was not a commercial success and did not chart. Its B-side was "Don't Mess with the Messer". Some German 7" feature the alternate title "Sugar and Spice" for "Don't Mess with the Messer".

== Critical reception ==
Professional ratings
Review scores
| Source | Rating |
|---|---|
| AllMusic | 3/5 stars |
| The Rolling Stone Album Guide | 1/5 stars |

Billboard magazine gave a positive review of the album, noting that the "music, vocals and production are all top notch" and that the "lyrics are better than the usual disco effort". Cash Box described Grace Jones as an "outrageous looking songstress" and praised the album's "sophisto-disco sound", the studio band led by Thor Baldursson, and Tom Moulton's "sterling production". The magazine recommended Muse to disco DJs seeking "pleasure/pain dancin' music".

Reviewing the Disco compilation, The Quietus argued that Muse was overlooked amid the 1979 backlash against disco, calling it "the best of the lot" and advocating a reassessment of Jones's early music career. He highlighted Thor Baldursson's contributions to the arrangements, particularly on "Sinning" and "Suffer", and noted that "Atlantic City Gambler" anticipated aspects of Warm Leatherette, while "On Your Knees" recalled "Pull Up to the Bumper" from Nightclubbing.

== Track listing ==
Note: Tracks from side A are a non-stop medley, with the total playing time 20:26.

Side one
| No. | Title | Writer(s) | Length |
|---|---|---|---|
| 1. | "Sinning" | Grace Jones, Pierre Papadiamandis | 5:06 |
| 2. | "Suffer" | Tom Moulton, Thor Baldursson | 4:17 |
| 3. | "Repentance (Forgive Me)" | Jones, Papadiamandis | 3:50 |
| 4. | "Saved" | Jack Robinson, David Christie, Vivienne Savoie Robinson | 7:13 |

Side two
| No. | Title | Writer(s) | Length |
|---|---|---|---|
| 5. | "Atlantic City Gambler" | Duke Williams, Moulton | 5:46 |
| 6. | "I'll Find My Way to You" | Stelvio Cipriani, Hal Sharp | 5:14 |
| 7. | "Don't Mess with the Messer" | Jones, Papadiamandis | 4:50 |
| 8. | "On Your Knees" | D.C. LaRue, Jerry Corbetta | 6:30 |

== Personnel ==
- Thor Baldursson – guest vocals, keyboards, arrangements
- Carla Benson – background vocals
- Keith Benson – drums
- Evette Benton – background vocals
- Richard Bernstein – artwork design
- Eve Boman – photography
- Carl Davis – arrangements
- Carl Helm – background vocals
- Phil Hurt – background vocals
- Barbara Ingram – background vocals
- Grace Jones – lead vocals
- Francis Jug – artwork design
- Tom Moulton – production
- Don Renaldo – strings, horns
- José Rodriguez – mastering
- Craig Snyder – guitar
- Arthur Stoppe – mixing
- Sweethearts of Sigma – background vocals
- Neil Terk – art direction
- Ron Tyson – background vocals
- Jim Walker – percussion
- Larry Washington – percussion
- Jimmy Williams – bass guitar

== Charts ==
Weekly chart performance for Muse
| Chart (1979) | Peak position |
|---|---|
| Swedish Albums (Sverigetopplistan) | 38 |
| US Billboard 200 | 156 |

== Release history ==
| Region | Year | Format(s) | Label |
|---|---|---|---|
| Worldwide | 1979 | LP/Cassette | Island |
| USA | 2011 | CD | Gold Legion |
| USA | 2014 | CD | Island |
| USA | 2018 | CD | Island/UMG |
