= Fame (Grace Jones album) =

Studio album by Grace Jones
- Released: 7 June 1978
- Recorded: 1977–1978
- Studios: Sigma Sound, Philadelphia, Pennsylvania
- Genre: Disco
- Length: 40:29
- Label: Island
- Producer: Tom Moulton

Grace Jones chronology
Portfolio (1977)	Fame (1978)	Muse (1979)

Singles from Fame
- 1. "Do or Die" Released: 1978; 2. "Autumn Leaves" Released: July 1978; 3. "Fame" Released: October 1978; 4. "Am I Ever Gonna Fall in Love in New York City" Released: December 1978

Fame is the second studio album by Grace Jones, released on 7 June 1978 by Island Records.

== Background, production and release ==
After relative success with her debut release, Grace Jones and Tom Moulton delivered a rapid follow-up album to Portfolio (1977). Fame, recorded in Sigma Sound Studios in Philadelphia, consisted of a set of mainstream-oriented disco tracks and repeated the scheme of the previous album. Like on Portfolio, side A was a continuous medley, and side B again opened with a re-interpretation of a French classic, this time it was Jacques Prévert's "Les Feuilles mortes", sung in English as "Autumn Leaves". The album was "dedicated with love to a true Artist, Jean-Paul Goude", as Jones put it in the liner notes.

The Canadian edition of the original vinyl album included another French language track, "Comme un oiseau qui s'envole", which replaced "All on a Summers Night" and, in most other territories, was issued as the B-side of the single "Do or Die". On the Japanese version of the album "Comme un oiseau qui s'envole" replaced "Below the Belt", which in turn in Italy was omitted in favour of an Italian song, "Anema e core". A number of songs from the album, including "Anema e core", have been performed in Italian TV show Stryx, which ran in late 1978.

The album was issued in CD format in the early 1990s, but soon went out of print. It was not available in any digital format until November 2011, when it received an official remastered CD release by Gold Legion, a record company that specializes in reissuing classic disco albums on CD. The re-release came with no bonus tracks. It was first released on CD in the UK in 2015, along with Portfolio and Muse, as part of the Disco boxed set of Jones' first three "disco" era albums. Each album in the set came with seven bonus tracks.

== Singles ==
"Do or Die" was the album's lead single and became a big club hit on the U.S. and Canadian dance charts. "Autumn Leaves" was released on a single with the song "Anema e core" from the Italian pressing of Fame. Although being the B-side track, "Anema e core" is strangely identified as the single's title on the cover.

"Fame" and "Am I Ever Gonna Fall in Love in New York City" also got single releases, but failed to chart.

== Commercial performance ==
The album was a hit on the North American club scene, and the "Do or Die"/"Pride"/"Fame" side reached top 10 on both the U.S. Hot Dance Club Play and Canadian Dance/Urban charts. Fame also charted respectably in Italy and Sweden which were Jones' most successful markets during the disco era.

Jones was ranked number 27 on Billboard's list of top 'Pop Female Artists' of 1978 due to the performance of Portfolio and Fame. Jones also ranked number 22 on the list of the top 'Pop Female Album Artists' and number 7 on 'New Female Albums Artists' for the same year. The performance of album cuts from Portfolio and Fame saw her appear at number 10 among the top Disco artists for 1978.

== Critical reception ==
Professional ratings
Review scores
Source	Rating
AllMusic	3/5 stars
Music Week	2/5 stars

Cash Box stated that the album was likely to "win over both disco strutters and mainstream pop fans", praising John Davis' "sizzling, pulsing arrangements", Tom Moulton's "crisp production", and noting that Jones' voice "has continued to improve", resulting in "a solid package of disco and pop excitement". Record World described it as "a stylish collection of songs", praising Jones as "one of the true personalities to emerge from the disco circuit" and highlighting the album's "percolating dance rhythms", particularly on its "interesting version" of "Autumn Leaves". Billboard described the album as "another winner for the dance floor" and Jones' vocals as "rather limited but breathy and brazen", though they were aided by "a top notch disco mix".

UK publication Music Week was less positive, rating the album two stars out of five and noted that even though Jones could be "the sort of artist who could take off with a cross over single", they could not "see her being the next Donna Summer" and felt "the album title is likely to prove ironic".

== Track listing ==
All lyrics are written by Jack Robinson, except where noted; all music is composed by James Bolden, except where noted.

Side A
No.	Title	Music	Length
1.	"Do or Die"		6:47
2.	"Pride"		6:23
3.	"Fame"	Gil Slavin	5:37
Total length:			18:46

Side B
No.	Title	Lyrics	Music	Length
4.	"Autumn Leaves"	Jacques Prévert; Johnny Mercer	Joseph Kosma	7:02
5.	"All on a Summers Night"			4:17
6.	"Am I Ever Gonna Fall in Love in New York City"	Vivienne Savoie Robinson; J. Robinson		5:28
7.	"Below the Belt"	Grace Jones	Pierre Papadiamandis	4:43
Total length:				21:30

Side B – Canadian release
No.	Title	Lyrics	Music	Length
4.	"Les feuilles mortes/Autumn Leaves"	Prévert; Mercer	Kosma	7:02
5.	"Comme un oiseau qui s'envole"	Jean-Claude Cosson	Slavin	4:30
6.	"Am I Ever Gonna Fall in Love in New York City"	V. S. Robinson; J. Robinson		5:28
7.	"Below the Belt (La vieille fille)"	Jones	Papadiamandis	4:43
Total length:				21:43

Side B – Italian release
No.	Title	Lyrics	Music	Length
4.	"Autumn Leaves"	Prévert; Mercer	Kosma	7:02
5.	"All on a Summers Night"			4:17
6.	"Am I Ever Gonna Fall in Love in New York City"	V. S. Robinson; J. Robinson		5:28
7.	"Anema e core"	Tito Manlio	Salve D'Esposito	3:58
Total length:				20:45

Notes

- Tracks on the album's A side form a continuous medley.

== Charts ==
Weekly chart performance for Fame
Chart (1978)	Peak position
Australian Albums (Kent Music Report)	59
Canadian Dance Albums (RPM)	5
Italian Albums (Musica e dischi)	15
Swedish Albums (Sverigetopplistan)	22
US Billboard 200	97
US Top R&B/Hip-Hop Albums (Billboard)	57
US Dance Club Songs (Billboard) LP cuts	3

== Personnel ==
- Keith Benson – drums
- Richard Bernstein – artwork design
- John Davis – arrangements, keyboards
- Grace Jones – lead vocals
- Francis Jug – photography
- Sonia Moskewitz – photography
- Moto – tambourines
- Piggy Pigerino – violin
- Don Renaldo – strings, horns
- José Rodriguez – mastering
- Darrell Rogers – recording and mixing assistance
- Arthur Stoppe – recording and mixing engineering
- Sweethearts of Sigma (Carla Benson, Yvette Benton, Barbara Ingram) – background vocals
- Neil Terk – art direction
- Larry Washington – congas, percussion
- Jimmy Williams – bass guitar

== Release history ==
Region	Year	Format(s)	Label
Various	1978	LP, Cassette	Island
Europe, Australia	1993	CD	Island, Spectrum Music, Karussell
United States	2011	CD	Gold Legion
