= Sugarloaf (album) =

Studio album by Sugarloaf
- Released: 1970
- Studio: Original Sound Studios, Hollywood, California
- Genre: Psychedelic rock
- Length: 37:37
- Label: Liberty
- Producer: J.C. Phillips, Frank Slay

Sugarloaf chronology
Sugarloaf (1970)	Spaceship Earth (1971)

Singles from Sugarloaf
- 1. "Green-Eyed Lady" Released: 1970

Sugarloaf is the debut album by American rock band Sugarloaf. It was released in 1970 and reached No. 24 on the Billboard Top LPs chart. It is best known for the No. 3 hit single "Green-Eyed Lady".

== Reception ==
Professional ratings
Review scores
Source	Rating
Allmusic	3/5 stars

In his retrospective review for Allmusic, critic Jim Newsom wrote that, aside from the hit "Green Eyed Lady", the album was "mostly generic rock of its era" and side two was "instantly forgettable."

== Track listing ==
Side one
No.	Title	Writer(s)	Length
1.	"Green-Eyed Lady"	Jerry Corbetta, J.C. Phillips, David Riordan	6:50
2.	"The Train Kept A-Rollin' (Stroll On)"	Tiny Bradshaw, Lois Mann, Chris Dreja, Jeff Beck, Jimmy Page, Keith Relf	2:23
3.	"Medley: Bach Doors Man / Chest Fever"	Corbetta, Bob Webber, Bob Raymond, Myron Pollock / J.R. Robertson	9:06

Side two
No.	Title	Writer(s)	Length
4.	"West of Tomorrow"	Corbetta, Phillips, Raymond	5:25
5.	"Gold and the Blues"	Corbetta, Raymond, Webber, Pollock	7:15
6.	"Things Are Gonna Change Some"	Corbetta, Raymond, Webber, Veeder van Dorn	6:38
Total length:			37:37

== Personnel ==
- Jerry Corbetta - organ, piano, clavichord, vocals
- Bob Webber - guitar, vocals
- Bob Raymond - bass
- Myron Pollock - drums
- Bob MacVittie - drums (on Green-Eyed Lady)
- Veeder van Dorn - vocals on West of Tomorrow and Things Are Gonna Change Some

Technical

- Paul Buff - engineer
- Ron Wolin - art direction, design
- Howard Risk - photography
- Langdon Winner - liner notes
