= On Your Knees =

On Your Knees may refer to:

- On Your Knees (EP), an EP by Great White
- "On Your Knees" (song), a 1979 song by Grace Jones
- "On Your Knees", a song by W.A.S.P. from the album W.A.S.P., 1984
