= A Rolling Stone =

Single by Grace Jones

from the album Warm Leatherette
- B-side: "Sinning"
- Released: April 18, 1980
- Length: 3:31
- Label: Island
- Songwriters: Deniece Williams; Fritz Baskett; Grace Jones
- Producers: Chris Blackwell; Alex Sadkin

Grace Jones singles chronology
"On Your Knees" (1979)	"A Rolling Stone" (1980)	"Love Is the Drug" (1980)

"A Rolling Stone" is a 1980 single by Jamaican singer Grace Jones.

== Background ==
The song was recorded for Jones' 1980 album Warm Leatherette, her first post-disco album, and was released as the first single from the album in the UK. It did not garner much attention and was quickly followed by "Love Is the Drug" and "Private Life". Unlike the majority of the material on Warm Leatherette, the song was not a cover version but a new composition co-written by Jones herself, Deniece Williams and Fritz Baskett. In the lyrics Jones complains to her lover about something missing in their relationship, which is affection. The 7" single featured an edited version of "Sinning", the opening track from the previous disco album Muse as the B-side. The 12" single included an extended remix of "A Rolling Stone", which was only released in the UK and remained unreleased on CD until it was included on the 2016 Remastered edition of Warm Leatherette.

== Track listing ==
7" single – WIP 6591

A. "A Rolling Stone" (LP version) – 3:31
B. "Sinning" (Edit) – 4:08

12" single – 12WIP 6591

A. "A Rolling Stone" (Long version) – 5:39
B. "Sinning" (Album version) – 5:05

== Release history ==
Release dates and formats for "A Rolling Stone"
Region	Date	Label(s)	Format(s)	Cat. No.	Ref.
United Kingdom	April 1980	Island Records	7-inch; 12-inch	WIP 6591; 12WIP 6591	
