= Don't Call Us, We'll Call You =

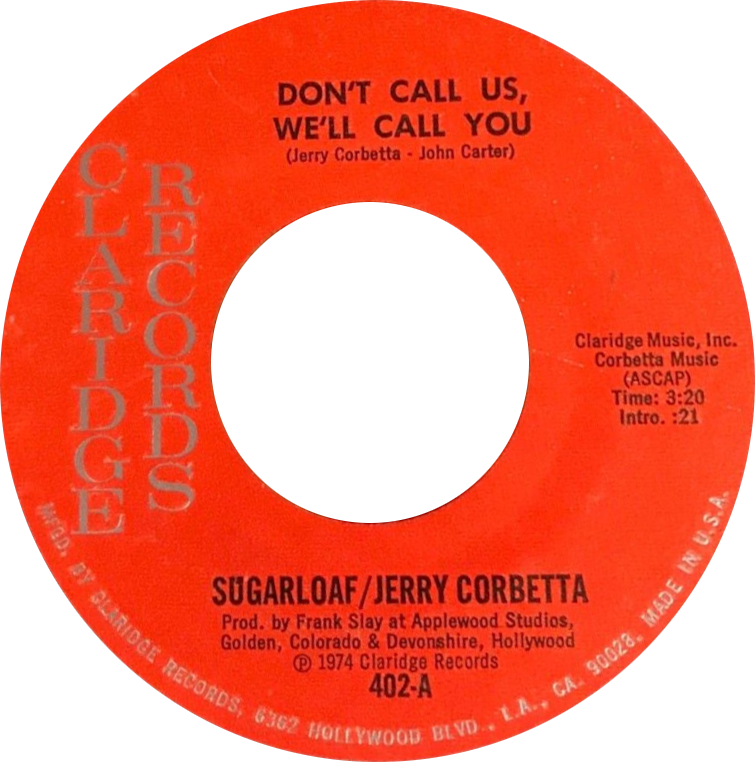
- Side A of the US single

Single by Sugarloaf

from the album Don't Call Us — We'll Call You
- B-side: "Texas Two-Lane"
- Released: November 1974
- Genre: Rock
- Length: 3:25
- Label: Claridge Records
- Songwriters: Jerry Corbetta, John Carter
- Producer: Frank Slay

Sugarloaf singles chronology
"Mother Nature's Wine" (1971)	"Don't Call Us, We'll Call You" (1974)	"I Got a Song" (1975)

"Don't Call Us, We'll Call You" is a hit song by the American rock band Sugarloaf. Co-written by lead vocalist Jerry Corbetta, the song was featured as the title track of the band's fourth and final album. It was their fourth single and was recorded at Applewood Studios in Golden, Colorado. Performing on the track, along with Jerry Corbetta, were session players Paul Humphries (drums), Max Bennett (bass), Ray Payne (guitar), and a group called the "Flying Saucers" (Jason Hickman, Mikkel Saks, and David Queen) on harmony vocals.

The song peaked at number nine on the U.S. Billboard Hot 100 in the winter of 1974-1975 and number 12 on the Cash Box Top 100. The song is their second greatest hit. It spent 21 weeks on the chart.

In Canada, "Don't Call Us, We'll Call You" was a bigger hit, where it reached number five for two weeks.

The song uses a guitar melody from the Beatles hit, "I Feel Fine" (which is also alluded to in the lyric, "sounds like John, Paul, and George") as well as a riff of Stevie Wonder's hit, "Superstition". An imitation of Wolfman Jack by disc jockey Ken Griffin also is featured briefly; the call sign of a radio station is stated ("Stereo 92" in the nationwide release). Numerous tracks of this line were cut to match local markets.

"Don't Call Us, We'll Call You" was performed on the TV series, The Midnight Special, with Wolfman Jack himself (the host and announcer of the program) making a cameo appearance on the "Stereo 92" line.

== Lyrical content ==
The song is a rather cynical view of the music industry, based on the band's real-life experience with what was then known as CBS Records but today is called Columbia Records. It describes the difficulty of breaking into the business and securing a contract from the record company, who claims that the band is good, but too derivative of other popular bands at the time. When the band finally breaks through with a hit ("Green-Eyed Lady") and completes a successful tour, the record company changes course and wants to offer the band their services, only to receive the same line they gave the band before their hit—"don't call us, we'll call you". The references are a joke at the expense of CBS Records, which had just turned them down for a recording contract. The song includes the sound of a touch-tone telephone number being dialed near the beginning and ending of the song. Those numbers were an unlisted phone number at CBS Records in Manhattan ("area code 212" stated in the song), and the number of the White House switchboard (in the similar-sounding area code 202).

== Chart performance ==
=== Weekly charts ===
Chart (1974–1975)	Peak position
Australia (Kent Music Report)	97
Canada RPM Top Singles	5
New Zealand	27
U.S. Billboard Hot 100	9
U.S. Cash Box Top 100	12

=== Year-end charts ===
Chart (1975)	Rank
Canada	57
U.S. Billboard Hot 100	56
