= Do or Die (Grace Jones song) =

Single by Grace Jones

from the album Fame
- B-side: "Comme un oiseau qui s'envole"
- Released: 1978
- Studio: Sigma Sound, Philadelphia, Pennsylvania
- Genre: Disco
- Length: 6:47
- Label: Island
- Composer: James Bolden
- Lyricist: Jack Robinson
- Producer: Tom Moulton

Grace Jones singles chronology
"La Vie en rose" (1977)	"Do or Die" (1978)	"On Your Knees" (1979)

European single sleeve

"Do or Die" is a single by Grace Jones, released in 1978, promoting her album Fame.

== Background ==
"Do or Die" was the first and in most parts of the world the only single release from Jones' Fame, her second disco album. On Fame it made up the first part of the A-side non-stop medley "Do or Die"/"Pride"/"Fame". The 7" single featured a heavily edited version (3:22) with the French-language non-album track "Comme un oiseau qui s'envole" as the B-side, included as a bonus track on the Canadian edition of the Fame album. The 12" single featured a slightly shorter mix of the album version with a cold end, and the B-side an extended mix of "Comme un oiseau qui s'envole". "Do or Die" reached number 3 on the US Billboard dance chart.

In 1985 the 7" edit of "Do or Die" was included as one of three disco tracks on the career retrospective Island Life, the other being the album versions of "I Need a Man" and "La Vie en rose" (1977).

== Music video ==
A music video was shot as a part of an Italian TV show Stryx, for which Jones made several more clips. It uses the Stryx studio set and sees Jones dancing with a surreal scenography in the background.

== Reception ==
Billboard magazine commented "this is mainstream disco featuring the distinctive vocals of the reigning queen of disco. The punchy horn and string arrangements are complemented by captivating breaks that spotlight the driving percussion."

== Track listing ==
- 7" single

A. "Do or Die" – 3:22
B. "Comme un oiseau qui s'envole" – 3:10

- 12" single

A. "Do or Die" – 6:15
B. "Comme un oiseau qui s'envole" – 4:30

== Charts ==
=== Weekly charts ===
Weekly chart performance for "Do or Die"
Chart (1978)	Peak position
Canada Dance/Urban (RPM)	6
Spain (AFYVE)	13
US Dance Club Songs (Billboard) "Do or Die"/"Pride"/"Fame"	3

=== Year-end charts ===
Year-end chart performance for "Do or Die"
Chart (1978)	Position
US Disco Audience Response (Billboard)	19

== Cover versions ==
Eartha Kitt recorded a cover of the song for her 1989 album I'm Still Here.

== Release history ==
Release dates and formats for "Do or Die"
Region	Date	Label(s)	Format(s)	Cat. No.	Ref.
United States	June 1978	Island Records	7-inch; 12-inch	IS 102; IS 1008	
United Kingdom	August 1978	Island Records	7-inch; 12-inch	WIP 6450; 12WIP 6450	
