= Sugarloaf (band) =

American rock band

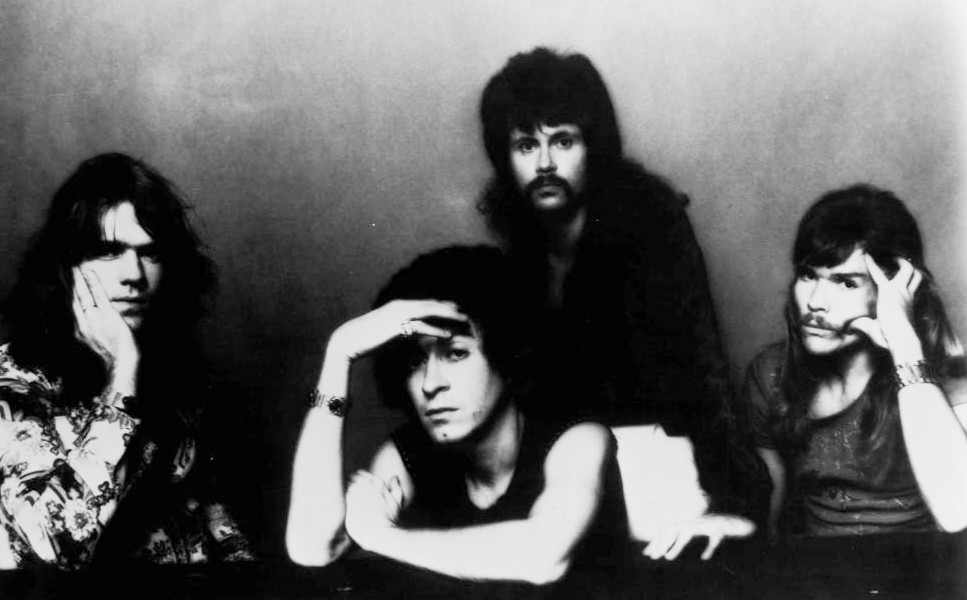
- Sugarloaf in July, 1974.

Background information
- Origin: Denver, Colorado, U.S.
- Genres: Rock, psychedelic rock
- Years active: 1970–1978, 1985, 1989–1991, 2012
- Labels: Liberty, Brut Records, Polydor, Claridge Records
- Past members: Jerry Corbetta; Bob Webber; Bob Raymond; Bob MacVittie; Bob Yeazel; Bobby Pickett; Myron Pollock; Larry Ferris; Ray Payne; Rusty Buchanan; Larry Wilkins; Bryan Grassmeyer

Sugarloaf was an American rock band that originated under the name Chocolate Hair in 1968. The band, which formed in Denver, Colorado, scored two Top 10 hits, with the singles "Green-Eyed Lady" and "Don't Call Us, We'll Call You".

As of 2025, a feature film about the band is being shot in Colorado. The film was written by Kyle Lamar of Digital Myle and Stacy Raymond, bassist Bob Raymond’s daughter-in-law.

== History ==
=== Moonrakers and Chocolate Hair ===
Lead vocalist and keyboardist Jerry Corbetta, along with guitarist Bob Webber, played together in the Denver-based band the Moonrakers. The Moonrakers had previously released four singles on Tower; The Moonrakers had evolved from the early 1960s band the Classics (previously the Surfin' Classics until they dropped their surf music focus). Members of all three incarnations later appeared on Sugarloaf songs.

In late 1968, Corbetta and Webber formed the band Chocolate Hair, including drummer Myron Pollock, who'd played previously with Corbetta, plus Webber's friend, bassist Bob Raymond. Corbetta played drums while with the Moonrakers, but cited a wish to play keyboards again as a primary reason for leaving to form the new band.

=== Name change and the Liberty years ===
Corbetta and Webber were signed to Frank Slay at this time and began recording demos during 1969. Slay got Chocolate Hair signed to Liberty Records, who liked the band’s demos, which were of such quality that Slay ended up having them put on the album.

In September 1969 Myron Pollock decided to leave the group and the former drummer for the Moonrakers and the Surfin' Classics, Bob MacVittie, was recruited. Moonrakers singer Veeder Van Dorn was also brought in to sing on the album, making his most notable appearances on the tracks "Things Gonna Change Some" and "West of Tomorrow", though he didn't end up becoming a permanent member. “Green-Eyed Lady", recorded at Original Sound studios in Hollywood, California, which featured MacVittie on drums, was a last-minute addition to the album, which was released in May 1970.

Just before the album's release, however, Liberty’s legal department suggested the name Chocolate Hair might be taken as having racist overtones. The band members agreed to change their name to Sugarloaf, the name of a mountain outside of Boulder, Colorado, where Bob Webber resided in an A-frame house.

"Green-Eyed Lady" was written by Corbetta along with his friend Ray Payne's Sweet Pain collaborators J.C. Phillips and David Riordan. The single peaked at No. 3 on the Billboard chart in October 1970, while their self-titled debut album hit No. 24.

Just after the first album's release, the group added singer/guitarist/composer Bob Yeazel, who’d previously played in Denver psychedelic music band Beast with Kenny Passarelli. The group recorded two albums with famed Buddy Holly producer Norman Petty. Yeazel was also a member of Superband with Jimmy Greenspoon, who later joined Three Dog Night. Yeazel featured heavily on Sugarloaf's second album, Spaceship Earth (January 1971), which managed to reach only No. 111. The album’s two singles, "Tongue-In-Cheek" and "Mother Nature's Wine", peaked at No. 55 and No. 88, respectively. The former was the final single ever issued by Liberty itself before it was folded into United Artists.

During 1970 and 1971, Sugarloaf had a heavy touring schedule that included appearances with The Who, Deep Purple, Eric Burdon & War, and other popular acts of the time. On March 16, 1971 they performed at an afterparty for the 13th Annual Grammy Awards with Aretha Franklin, Three Dog Night and others.

The band became a sextet when they welcomed former Maul & the Kutups bassist Bobby Pickett (not to be confused with the "Monster Mash" performer) on May 16, 1971 and six days later, they appeared on American Bandstand to play "Green Eyed Lady" and "Mother Nature's Wine".

In 1972 Sugarloaf played on the single "I.O.I.O.", a cover of a Bee Gees song recorded by TV actor Butch Patrick that was produced by Frank Slay.

Bob Yeazel and Bobby Pickett left Sugarloaf sometime in mid-1972. Pickett later went on to perform with Etta James, Gregg Allman, Detective and Cafe R&B. After playing in various bands for a while, Yeazel took an eight-year break from performing before he once again began touring, writing songs and recording demos.

After a falling out with Corbetta, Bob Webber, Bob Raymond and Bob MacVittie departed the group as well by late 1972, leaving Corbetta with the rights to the Sugarloaf name.

=== Resumption and another hit ===
Eventually Liberty decided to drop all their artists and Sugarloaf was in limbo in 1973 as Corbetta signed to Neil Bogart's Brut Records label, which Bogart had created and distributed, via his Buddah Records imprint, for the Brut Fabergé company.

The next album, I Got a Song, released in late 1973, was started as a Corbetta solo record but ended up becoming Sugarloaf's third album when Webber and Raymond rejoined Corbetta, with drummer Larry Ferris (also a former member of Beast), to play on the album and once again began making live appearances. This iteration of Sugarloaf played a spot on The Midnight Special that aired on April 19, 1974.

But after Brut folded, the group's future was once again in question as Corbetta and Frank Slay bought the album back from Bogart and went to a friend's recording studio in Denver in 1974 to record a new song, "Don't Call Us, We'll Call You", with session players Paul Humphries (drums), Max Bennett (bass), Ray Payne (guitar) and a group called the Flying Saucers (Jason Hickman, Mikkel Saks and David Queen) on harmony vocals. This song was notable because it contained a practical joke at the expense of CBS Records, which had just turned them down for a recording contract. The song includes the sound of a touch-tone telephone number being dialed near the beginning and ending of the song. Those numbers were an unlisted phone number at CBS Records in Manhattan ("area code 212" stated in the song) – coincidentally a public number at the White House as well (different area code). In addition, the recording includes snippets of the guitar riff of the Beatles' "I Feel Fine", Stevie Wonder's "Superstition" and a line of dialogue from disc jockey Ken Griffin imitating Wolfman Jack (who later performed the song live with the group on their next Midnight Special appearance) stating the call sign of a radio station ("Stereo 92" in the nationwide release); numerous tracks of this line were cut to match local markets. "Don't Call Us...", written by Corbetta along with John Carter, was released in November 1974 on Slay's Claridge Records label and after it took off and peaked at No. 9 in April 1975, the I Got a Song album was quickly re-released under the new title of Don't Call Us, We'll Call You with the hit single added in place of another track, "Easy Evil". But the album stalled out at US No. 152 on the Billboard Top 200.

Also in 1974, Corbetta played with the group Disco-Tex and the Sex-O-Lettes on their hit "Get Dancin'", that was produced by Bob Crewe, Corbetta's new partner, and contributed to other projects, including the band Chinook.

Another single not on the LP, "Stars in My Eyes", peaked at No. 87 in June 1975 and Sugarloaf realigned with Corbetta, Webber, Raymond and original Chocolate Hair/first album drummer Myron Pollock and toured once again in 1975 behind the success of "Don't Call Us...". A live recording of the band was made at Ebbets Field (a small club, not the former Brooklyn ball park) in Denver on January 15, 1975 that was eventually released in 2006 as the CD Alive in America.

"I Got a Song", the title track of their 1973 album, was released as a single in October 1975 but only "bubbled under" on Billboard at No. 110. A Corbetta solo single, "You Set My Dreams to Music", recorded around this time, ended up in a 1977 film The Legend of Frank Woods and Sugarloaf's final single, "Satisfaction Guaranteed", was released in 1976 but failed to chart. All singles from "Don't Call Us..." on appeared on the Claridge label.

=== Break-up and later years ===
By the end of 1975, Webber and Raymond were gone from the group and Corbetta continued to tour as Jerry Corbetta and Sugarloaf with drummer Myron Pollock, adding Ray Payne on guitar and Rusty Buchanan (later with Player) on bass until 1978 when he decided to retire the Sugarloaf name and pursue a solo career. His first and only solo album, Jerry Corbetta, was put out on Warner Bros. that same year. He was also a member of Frankie Valli and the Four Seasons from 1980 to 1984.

On June 12, 1985 there was a one/off Sugarloaf reunion at the Colorado Cream Festival that included Corbetta, Myron Pollock, Bob Yeazel, and new players Larry Wilkins (guitar) and Bryan Grassmeyer (bass).

During 1989 to 1991, Corbetta and Wilkins attempted to get Sugarloaf up and running again with the help of Bob Crewe but without success.

In 1991 Corbetta was part of a touring rock & roll nostalgia show, 30 Years of Rock and Roll. This led to him teaming with two other rock vets on that bill, guitarist/singer Mike Pinera (ex-Blues Image and Iron Butterfly) and bassist Dennis Noda (ex-Cannibal & the Headhunters), later that year to form another all stars touring act, the Sugarloaf/Iron Butterfly/Cannibal & the Headhunters Revue, which changed its moniker to the Classic Rock All-Stars in 1992 and added former Rare Earth singer/drummer Peter Rivera and various others, like Micky Dolenz and Spencer Davis, who drifted in and out over the years.

According to Corbetta, a few times during the 1990s and in 2005, the Classic Rock All-Stars did a few shows as Sugarloaf with a different drummer in place of Rivera.

On January 19, 2008 The Brewery Arts Center in Carson City, Nevada, presented the Brewery's Legends of Rock show, which featured Corbetta and Noda, plus Omar Martinez (ex-Paul Revere and the Raiders) and local guitarist Michael Furlong.

Corbetta was forced to retire from performing in 2010 after developing Pick's disease.

On September 8, 2012 Jerry, Bob Webber, Bob Raymond, Bob MacVittie, Bob Yeazel, Bobby Pickett, and Myron Pollock reunited to play as Sugarloaf at the Boulder Theater for their induction into the Colorado Music Hall of Fame.

On September 9, 2012 Bob Webber had a Hall of Fame after-party at a golf club in Denver in which he, Corbetta, Raymond, and Pollock gathered to play one last time as Sugarloaf.

Bassist Bob Raymond (born Robert William Raymond on March 4, 1946) died of lung cancer in Centennial, Colorado on February 11, 2016, at the age of 69.

Guitarist Bob Yeazel (born Robert Devon Lee Yeazel on November 1, 1946 in Denver, Colorado) died in Stuart, Florida on June 9, 2016 at the age of 69.

Corbetta died in Denver on September 16, 2016 at the age of 68 after struggling for seven years with Pick's disease.

In late 2020, a tape was found by Bob Webber in a case of cables being trashed. The tape turned out to be a live recording of Sugarloaf at another 1975 show. Webber restored the tape and remastered it for vinyl. Sugarloaf Live 1975 was then officially released on September 8, 2022.

Some of the surviving members of Sugarloaf along with longtime friends and co-musicians reunited for an album release party for Sugarloaf Live 1975 on September 11, 2022 at the Wild Goose saloon in Parker Colorado. The members on this night were Bob Webber, Myron Pollock, Bobby Pickett, keyboardist Denny Flannigan, vocalist/guitarist Kick Stevens (aka Bailey Raymond, grandson of Bob Raymond) and Freddi Gowdy of the Freddi-Henchi band joining them on stage to sing "Them Changes".

Former Sugarloaf guitarist Bob Webber went on to become an aerospace engineer and drummer Bob MacVittie moved to Arkansas and pursued restaurant management.

== Discography ==
=== Albums ===
- Sugarloaf (Liberty Records, 1970) US No. 24
- Spaceship Earth (Liberty Records, 1971) US No. 111
- I Got a Song (Brut Records, 1973)
- Don't Call Us - We'll Call You (Claridge Records, 1975) US No. 152
- Alive in America (Renaissance, 2006)
- Sugarloaf Live 1975 (Ray Banger Records, 2022)

=== Singles ===
- "Green-Eyed Lady" (1970) US No. 3, Can. No.1, AUS No. 53
- "Tongue in Cheek" (1971) US No. 55, Can. No. 40
- "Mother Nature's Wine" (1971) US No. 88
- "Don't Call Us, We'll Call You" (1974) US No. 9, Can. No. 5, AUS No. 97
- "Stars in My Eyes" (1975) US No. 87
- "I Got a Song" (1975) US No. 110
