= Portfolio (Grace Jones album) =

Studio album by Grace Jones
- Released: September 6, 1977
- Recorded: 1975–1977
- Studios: Sigma Sound, Philadelphia, Pennsylvania
- Genre: Disco
- Length: 36:59
- Label: Island
- Producer: Tom Moulton

Grace Jones chronology
Portfolio (1977)	Fame (1978)

Singles from Portfolio
- 1. "I Need a Man" Released: 1975; 2. "Sorry" Released: September 1976; 3. "That's the Trouble" Released: 1976; 4. "La Vie en rose" Released: October 1977; 5. "What I Did for Love" Released: 1977

Portfolio is the debut studio album by Jamaican singer and songwriter Grace Jones, released in 1977 by Island Records. It spawned her first big hit, "La Vie en rose".

== Background and production ==
Having enjoyed a successful modelling career in Paris and New York in the early 1970s, Jones released a series of singles throughout 1975–1976. None of them, however, managed to succeed on the mainstream charts. Jones secured a record deal with Island Records in 1977 and found wider recognition only with her debut Island album, Portfolio.

The album was recorded at mixed in Sigma Sound Studios in Philadelphia, and released in autumn 1977 as the first of three albums made with the legendary disco record producer Tom Moulton. Side one of the original vinyl album is a continuous disco medley covering three songs from Broadway musicals, "Send in the Clowns" by Stephen Sondheim from A Little Night Music, "What I Did for Love" from A Chorus Line and "Tomorrow" from Annie. Side two opens with Jones' very personal re-interpretation of Édith Piaf's "La Vie en rose" and continues with three new recordings, two of which Jones co-wrote. The Italian release would omit "Sorry" and "That's the Trouble", adding an extended, over 7-minute-long version of "I Need a Man" instead. The album's artwork was designed by Richard Bernstein, an artist working for Interview, who would later contribute artwork to Jones' next two records; the singer would team up with him again for the 1986 album Inside Story.

== Singles ==
"I Need a Man" was Jones' debut single, originally released in 1975 by the minor French label Orfeus. It failed to make any chart impact until two years later, when it was re-mixed and released via the Beam Junction label, becoming a number-one dance hit in the US and introducing Jones to club audiences, primarily gay. The second single, "Sorry", was released a year prior to the Portfolio album, and was a modest success on the US singles chart. Its B-side track, "That's the Trouble", also received a separate A-side release. Both songs were Jones' first forays into songwriting. "La Vie en rose" was released as a single in autumn 1977 and became the biggest hit from Portfolio, having charted in the French and Italian top 5. When re-released in 1983, it reached the top 5 in the Netherlands. "What I Did for Love" became a top 10 dance hit in the US.

== Critical reception ==
Professional ratings
Review scores
Source	Rating
AllMusic	2/5 stars
Christgau's Record Guide	C+
Music Week	3/5 stars
The Rolling Stone Album Guide	1/5 stars

On the album's initial release, Billboard magazine gave a positive review, describing the album as a "perfect barometer for one's feeling about disco" and felt that "disco lovers will play it non-stop", further noting that the album was "sexy and perfect to dance to". The songs "La Vie en Rose" and "I Need a Man" were chosen as the best cuts from the album.

Music Week gave the album three stars out of five, noting Grace's "unique set of vocal cords" and "her own special idea of what disco ought to be". While the album "[functioned] admirably" as disco music, some listeners may find it "difficult to sustain" interest in the full album.

Andrew Hamilton from AllMusic website gave the album two out of five stars and wrote that "though polished [the album] tracks don't jump out at you" and conclude that it was more a "producer's album." He also gave credit to her because "she gives credence to old fuddies" like "Send in the Clowns," "La Vie en Rose" and "I Need a Man," whose according to him "displays a vulnerable Jones".

Robert Christgau gave the album a C+ and praised the way Jones sing the songs ("very liberated, very punky"). He also wrote that Jones "sings flat enough to make Andrea True sound like Linda Ronstadt and Tom Verlaine like Art Garfunkel".

Rolling Stone magazine gave the album one out of five stars.

== Commercial performance ==
Portfolio reached number 52 on the Black Albums Chart in the US, while climbing to number 109 on Billboard's mainstream albums chart. It garnered more attention in Europe, entering the top 10 in both Italy in early 1978 and the Netherlands in 1983.

Due to the commercial performance of Portfolio and the singles "Sorry / That's the Trouble" and "I Need a Man", Grace placed eighth in top ranking Disco artists of 1977 according to Billboard.

== Track listing ==
All tracks produced by Tom Moulton.

Side one
No.	Title	Writer(s)	Length
1.	"Send in the Clowns"	Stephen Sondheim	7:33
2.	"What I Did for Love"	Marvin Hamlisch; Edward Kleban	5:15
3.	"Tomorrow"	Martin Charnin; Charles Strouse	5:48

Side two
No.	Title	Writer(s)	Length
4.	"La Vie en rose"	Édith Piaf; Louis Guglielmi	7:27
5.	"Sorry"	Grace Jones; Pierre Papadiamandis	3:58
6.	"That's the Trouble"	Jones; Papadiamandis	3:36
7.	"I Need a Man"	Paul Slade; Papadiamandis	3:23

Notes

- Side one's tracks are a non-stop medley, with its total playing time being 18:36.
- Italian releases of the record feature the same tracklist as the original release, but exclude "Sorry" and "That's the Trouble" while "I Need a Man" appears as a 7:30 minutes extended mix.

== Personnel ==
- Wilbur Bascomb – bass guitar
- Richard Bernstein – album graphics concept, design and painting
- Bobby Eli – guitars
- Grace Jones – vocals
- Francis Jug – photography
- Carlton "Cotton" Kent – keyboards, piano
- Ron "Have Mercy" Kersey – Rhodes piano
- Antonio Lopez – photography
- Jay Mark – recording and mixing engineering
- Vincent Montana Jr. – arrangement, conducting, vibraphone
- Cliff Morris – guitars
- Moto – tambourines
- Lance Quinn – guitars
- Don Renaldo – strings, horns
- José Rodriguez – mastering
- Allan Schwartzberg – drums
- Arthur Stoppe – recording and mixing engineering
- Sweethearts of Sigma (Barbara Ingram, Carla Benson, Evette Benton) – backing vocals
- Larry Washington – conga
- Duke Williams – arrangement

== Charts ==
Weekly chart performance for Portfolio
Chart (1977–1983)	Peak position
Australia (Kent Music Report)	27
Dutch Albums (Album Top 100)	8
Italy (Musica e dischi)	9
Portugal (Musica & Som)	6
Swedish Albums (Sverigetopplistan)	22
US Billboard 200	109
US Top R&B/Hip-Hop Albums (Billboard)	52

== Certifications ==
Certifications for Portfolio
Region	Certification	Certified units/sales
France (SNEP)	Gold	100,000^{*}
Italy (FIMI)	Gold	50,000^{*}
^{*} Sales figures based on certification alone.

== Release history ==
Release dates and formats for Portfolio
Region	Date	Label(s)	Format(s)	Cat. No.	Ref.
United States	October 1977	Island Records	LP; Cassette; 8-track	ILPS 9470; ZCI-9470; Y8I-9470	
United Kingdom	November 1977	Island Records	LP; Cassette	ILPS 9470; ZCI 9470	
Europe	1987	Island Records	CD	CID 9470	
