= On Your Knees (song) =

Single by Grace Jones

from the album Muse
- B-side: "Don't Mess with the Messer"
- Released: August 1979
- Genre: Disco
- Length: 6:20 (album version); 3:22 (radio edit)
- Label: Island
- Songwriter(s): D.C. LaRue; Jerry Corbetta
- Producer(s): Tom Moulton

Grace Jones singles chronology
"Do or Die" (1978)	"On Your Knees" (1979)	"A Rolling Stone" (1980)

"On Your Knees" is a 1979 single by the Jamaican singer Grace Jones.

== Background ==
The song was the first and in most parts of the world the only single release from Grace Jones' third album Muse (1979). In most territories it was credited as a double A-side with "Don't Mess with the Messer". The 7" single featured edited versions of both tracks while the 12" included a very slightly different mix of "On Your Knees" and an extended remix of "Don't Mess with the Messer". The edit versions of "Don't Mess with the Messer" and "On Your Knees" and the long version of "Don't Mess with the Messer" were released for the first time in CD on the Grace's box set Disco. The single was ignored by the record-buying public and left little impact on dance music charts in the US.

The record cover artwork, designed by Richard Bevistein, was featured in Michael Ochs' 1996 book 1000 Record Covers.

== Track listing ==
=== "On Your Knees" ===
- 7" single

A. "On Your Knees" – 3:47
B. "Don't Mess with the Messer" – 4:05

- 7" promotional single

A. "On Your Knees" (stereo edit) – 3:49
B. "On Your Knees" (mono edit) – 3:49

- 12" single

A. "On Your Knees" – 6:30
B. "Don't Mess with the Messer" – 6:27

=== "Don't Mess with the Messer" ===
- 7" single

A. "Don't Mess with the Messer" – 4:10
B. "On Your Knees" – 3:49

== Chart performance ==
Chart (1979)	Peak position
US Dance Club Songs (Billboard)	28
