= Claridge Records =

American record label

- Founded: 1965 (First incarnation); 1974 (Second incarnation)
- Founder: Frank Slay; Dennis Ganim
- Defunct: 1967 (First incarnation); 1978 (Second incarnation)
- Distributor(s): Self-distributed
- Genre: Various
- Country of origin: United States

Claridge Records was an American independent record label, owned by Frank Slay.

== History ==
Claridge Records was started in 1965 by Frank Slay and Dennis Ganim as a division of River Bottom Enterprises. At that time, it was based in New York. The Rockin' Ramrods were the first band that signed a recording contract with the new company in 1965. "Don't Fool with Fu Manchu" was issued in October, 1965, but was unsuccessful. Claridge Records released 19 singles but, due to lack of success, closed down in 1967.

In 1974, the label was revived in Los Angeles. One of its signings, Sugarloaf, had a Billboard Hot 100 hit that peaked at number nine with "Don't Call Us, We'll Call You", in 1975. Other artists were Bo Kirkland and Ruth Davis.

In 1976, the company changed its focus from rock to disco, this time releasing 37 singles, three albums, and a few 12" disco singles. It closed down again in 1978. In 1980, the company was sold to MPL Communications.
