= Frantique =

American disco group

- Genre: Disco
- Years active: 1979–1980
- Label: Philadelphia International
- Past members: Tricia LynnCheyenne; Florence Raynor; Denise Roselle

Frantique was an American disco group signed to Philadelphia International Records. They released their self-titled album in 1979. A track from the album, "Strut Your Funky Stuff" charted on the UK Singles Chart in 1979, peaking at No. 10 in September.

The band were assembled to support the release of the single, and it's unclear to this day who originally sang lead vocals on the record.

"Strut Your Funky Stuff" was written by Vivienne Savoie Robinson, James Bolden and Jack Robinson.

== Discography ==
=== Albums ===
- Frantique (Philadelphia International, 1979)

=== Singles ===
Year	Song	UK
1979	"Strut Your Funky Stuff"	10
1979	"Disco Dancer"	—
1980	"Steady with Teddy"	—
"—" denotes releases that did not chart.
