= Sorry (Grace Jones song) =

"Sorry" / "That's the Trouble"

Single by Grace Jones

from the album Portfolio
- Released: October 1976
- Genre: Disco; soul
- Length: 3:58 ("Sorry" album version); 3:36 ("That's the Trouble" single version); 3:56 ("That's the Trouble" album version)
- Label: Beam Junction; Orfeus
- Songwriters: Grace Jones; Pierre Papadiamondis
- Producer: Tom Moulton

Grace Jones singles chronology
"I Need a Man" (1975)	"Sorry" / "That's the Trouble" (1976)	"La Vie en rose" (1977)

"Sorry" is a song by Jamaican singer and actress Grace Jones, released in 1976 with "That's the Trouble" as a Double A-Side single.

== Background ==
"Sorry"/"That's the Trouble" was Jones' second single, released before her international breakthrough, on the Orfeus label in France and Beam Junction in the US. Both songs later appeared on Jones' debut album Portfolio; 7" version of "Sorry" and an alternate mix of "That's the Trouble" were placed there. Both the original single version and the instrumental of "That's the Trouble" remain unreleased on CD. The extended 12" mixes of both tracks were released on Grace's box set Disco.

Grace Jones explained in her 2015 memoir that "Sorry" and "That's the Trouble" were issued as a double A-side because she didn't want either song "to be a mere B-side", which were often seen as "throwaway" tracks.

== Reception ==
=== Awards and nominations ===
Year	Awards	Work	Category	Result	Ref.
1977	Billboard Disco Awards	"Sorry" / "That's the Trouble"	Heavy Disco/Light Radio (Single of the Year)	Nominated	
1977	Billboard Disco Awards	"Sorry" / "That's the Trouble"	Disco DJ's Favorite 12" Disc	Nominated	

== Track listing ==
French 7" single (1976) / U.S. 7" single (1976) / U.K. 7" single (1977)

A. "Sorry" – 3:58
B. "That's the Trouble" – 3:36

German 7" single (1976) / Dutch 7" single (1977)

A. "That's the Trouble" – 3:36
B. "Sorry" – 3:58

U.S. 12" single (1976)

A. "Sorry" – 6:42
B. "That's the Trouble" – 7:02

French 12" single (1976) / Dutch 12" single (1977)

A. "That's the Trouble" – 7:02
B. "Sorry" – 6:42

== Chart performance ==
Chart (1977)	Peak position
US Billboard Hot 100	71
US Dance Club Songs (Billboard)	7
