= I Love to Love (But My Baby Loves to Dance) =

Single by Tina Charles

from the album I Love to Love
- B-side: "Disco Fever"
- Released: 23 January 1976; 1986 (remix)
- Recorded: 1975
- Genre: Disco, pop
- Length: 3:02
- Label: CBS
- Songwriters: Jack Robinson, James Bolden
- Producer: Biddu

Tina Charles singles chronology
| "You Set My Heart on Fire" (1975) | "I Love to Love" (1976) | "Love Me Like a Lover" (1976) |

Tina Charles singles chronology
| "Running into Danger" (1985) | "I Love to Love (remix)" (1986) | "Second Time Around" (1986) |

"I Love to Love (But My Baby Loves to Dance)" is a song by British singer Tina Charles, released in 1976 as the second single from her debut album, I Love to Love. The song was composed by Jack Robinson and James Bolden. The track was an international success both upon its original 1976 release and also when - remixed by the DMC (Disco Mix Club) - it was reissued ten years later (the DMC version features the instrumental "Sunburn" by the Biddu Orchestra as its B-side).

== Background ==
Charles had already been recording for seven years and had sung lead on the international hit "I'm on Fire" by 5000 Volts (1975), but her contribution was unacknowledged, with Luan Peters cited as vocalist in promotion for the group. It was through a mutual friend, singer Lee Vanderbilt, that Charles met record producer Biddu who encouraged her to record "I Love to Love (But My Baby Loves to Dance)", using Manchester musicians Richie Close (keyboard), Clive Allen (guitar), Des Browne (bass) and Tom Daley (percussion) to create a signature hit sound for Charles.

"I Love to Love..." was an international hit, reaching #1 in Ireland, #2 in France, the Netherlands, Norway, Portugal and Sweden while in Austria, Germany and Spain the single peaked at respectively #20, #6 and #3. The track was also a hit in Australia (#6) and New Zealand (#7). In Canada "I Love to Love..." won the Juno for bestselling international single for the year 1976 having sold over 200,000 copies in the province of Quebec.

The British television series River used this song at the start and end of the first episode and at the end of the last episode. Benny Andersson has stated that hearing the song again in this series inspired him to write "Don't Shut Me Down" for ABBA's 2021 album Voyage.

== Track listings ==
7" single

1. "I Love to Love" — 3:02
2. "Disco Fever" — 4:12

== Charts and sales ==
=== Weekly charts ===
| Chart (1976) | Peak position |
|---|---|
| Argentina | 8 |
| Australia (Kent Music Report) | 6 |
| Austrian Singles Chart | 20 |
| Canadian Singles Chart | 14 |
| West German Singles Chart | 6 |
| Irish Singles Chart | 1 |
| Norwegian Singles Chart | 2 |
| South African Singles Chart | 4 |
| Swedish Singles Chart | 2 |
| UK Singles Chart | 1 |
| U.S. Billboard Disco Singles | 2 |
| Chart (1986) ^{1} | Peak position |
| UK Singles Chart | 67 |
| Chart (1987) ^{1} | Peak position |
| French Singles Chart | 2 |
| West German Singles Chart | 5 |
| UK Singles Chart | 87 |

^{1} Remix

=== Year-end charts ===
| Chart (1976) | Position |
|---|---|
| Australia (Kent Music Report) | 47 |

| Chart (1987) | Position |
|---|---|
| Dutch Top 40 | 45 |
| European Top 100 Singles (Music & Media) | 21 |

=== Certifications ===
| Region | Certification | Certified units/sales |
|---|---|---|
| France (SNEP) | Silver | 250,000^{*} |
| United Kingdom (BPI) | Gold | 500,000^{^} |
^{*} Sales figures based on certification alone.^{^} Shipments figures based on certification alone.

== See also ==
- List of UK Singles Chart number ones of the 1970s
