= Gilles Marchal =

French singer and songwriter (1944–2013)

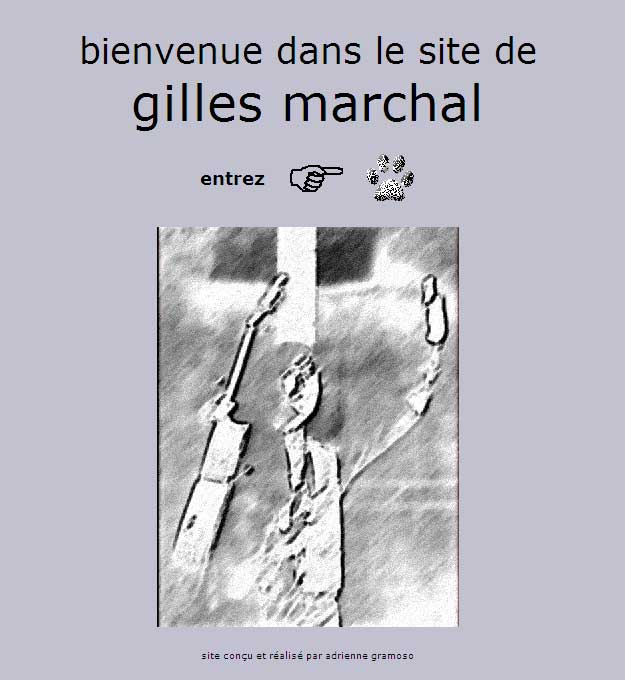

Gilles Marchal (2 September 1944 – 11 April 2013), born Gilles Pastre, was a French songwriter and singer who reached the height of his career during the 1970s.

== Life ==
Discovered by Georges Chatelain, his producer, who signed (with Jack Robinson as a co-producer) a contract with Disc' AZ and Lucien Morisse, who was then the program director at Europe 1. Most of his repertoire was original, but at the beginning of his career he performed a few interesting covers of songs by Lee Hazlewood and Fred Neil. "Summer Wine", for example, which Lee Hazlewood originally sang with Nancy Sinatra, was covered by Marchal in 1969 in a duet with Martine Habib, a young singer whom he met at CBE Studios and whose voice is reminiscent of Joan Baez. Marchal also chose to interpret the song in English; a French translation appeared this same year ("Le vin de l'été" by Marie Laforêt and Gérard Klein). One of Marchal's greater successes, "Un étranger dans la ville", is a version of "Everybody's Talkin'" by Fred Neil. (Harry Nilsson sang the original version for the credits of John Schlesinger's film Midnight Cowboy.)

Marchal also sang "Je suis né sous une étoile filante" (a Lerner and Loewe song translated to French by Mr. Vidalin) and "Buddy River" (a Lee Hazlewood song translated by Vline Buggy and Yves Dessca). The success of these two singles during the summer of 1970 propelled Marchal to the front of the French music scene and to first place in the hit parade. In 1971, "Liberté" by Charles Orieux and Jean-max Riviere was also an immense success for him reaching No.5 in the French charts on 25 March 1972.

Marchal has written several songs, both solo ("Nous vivrons tous les trois", "Ne pleure pas ma mie") or with his friends and producers at CBE, George Chatelain and Bernard Estardy ("Dieu qu'elle était belle", "Quand je te regarde vivre").

In the 1970s and 1980s, Marchal continued to record. Little by little, he gave up his "cowboy" persona in favor of the "new man". In homage to the Paris area, he sang the anthem "Les prénoms de l'Ile de France" (words by Claude Lemesle) in 1977. The following year, he released an album at Sonopresse containing his own words and music. Songs such as "Drôle de vie" were a great success both in France and abroad, as well as "C'était en France" and lighter songs like "Miss Pharmago" and "C'est pas la Chine". In 1985, Marchal recorded a 45 of "Celine" (by Vline Buggy, Hugues Aufray and Mort Shuman); the B side featured "Les maisons sans visage", with music by Marchal and lyrics by Vline Buggy.

Gilles Marchal retired from show business in 1985. He died on 11 April 2013.

== Discography ==
=== Albums ===
- Comme un étranger dans la ville (1971)
  - FACE A
    - Je ne suis qu'un pauvre homme
    - Pas de bois pour me réchauffer les doigts
    - Dieu qu'elle était belle
    - Comme un étranger dans la ville
    - Nous vivrons tous les trois
    - Summer wine (avec Martine Habib)
  - FACE B
    - Window seat (avec Martine Habib)
    - Quand je te regarde vivre
    - Ne pleure pas ma mie
    - Valse à quatre patte
    - L'étoile filante
    - Pauvre Buddy River
- Clémentine Pépin (1974)
  - FACE A
    - Clémentine Pépin
    - Tout à apprendre, tout à oublier
    - On a volé la Tour Eiffel
    - L'amour va plus vite qu'un coureur à pied
    - Liz et Richard
    - La planète des rêves'
  - FACE B
    - I love you
    - Va dire à tes parents
    - Le jour de ta fête
    - L'amour en retard
    - Pardonnez Mad'moiselle
    - Elle'
- Drôle de vie (1978)
  - FACE A
    - L'amour muet
    - La moitié du parcours
    - Le courage
    - D'appartement
    - C'est pas la Chine
    - A ma mère
  - FACE B
    - C'était en France
    - Papa, Maman, etc.
    - Miss Pharmago
    - Les roses
    - Drôle de vie

=== EPs ===
- 1967, Le père Noël est mort / Vierge Marie / Sans rancune / Il a beau passer
- 1968, Le chanteur d'amour / Trou la la ou ti / Je me passe de vous / C'est normal mais pas évident

=== Singles ===
- 1968, Dieu qu'elle était belle / Ne pleure pas ma mie
- 1968, Summer wine / Ma belle
- 1968, La valse à quatre pattes / Où es-tu donc passée (l'autoroute)
- 1969, Comme un étranger dans la ville / Nous vivrons tous les trois
- 1969, Where do people go (chanson du film Trop petit mon ami) / Window Seat
- 1970, L'étoile filante / Quand je te regarde vivre
- 1970, Pauvre Buddy River / Je m'en vais dans un avion
- 1970, Cry no more Maria / Ne pleure pas ma mie
- 1971, Liberté / Les rues de la ville
- 1971, Non non-personne / Mardi
- 1971, Je ne suis qu'un pauvre homme / Pas de bois pour me réchauffer les doigts
- 1971, La ballata di Buddy river (Pauvre Buddy river) / Noi vivremo per lui (Nous vivrons tous les trois)
- 1972, Un cow-boy n'est jamais tranquille / L'été à fleur de peau
- 1972, En 89 / Quand tu parleras au diable
- 1973, Un homme libre (chanson du film Un homme libre) / conscience
- 1973, Si je t'avais rêvée / Jocelyne
- 1973, Elle / L'amour en retard
- 1974, Août à l'Opéra / La martienne
- 1976, On n'refait pas le monde avec une chanson / Maurice et fils
- 1977, Jeanne est là / Tu es le centre du monde
- 1977, Tu devrais chanter / Tu es le centre du monde
- 1978, Drôle de vie / Miss Pharmago
- 1978, Les prénoms de l'Ile de France / Version instrumentale
- 1979, Marteau disco / C'est pas la Chine
- 1980, Ils ont perdu leur chanteur / Les clés sous la porte
- 1982, Je t'aime trop / L'amitié
- 1985, Céline / Les maisons sans visages
