= Thunder in Paradise (video game) =

1995 video game

- Developer: Philips POV Entertainment
- Publisher: Philips Interactive Media
- Director: Robert Weaver
- Producers: David Riordan; David Todd
- Writer: Tom Greene
- Platforms: Philips CD-i, MS-DOS
- Release: 1995

Thunder in Paradise is an interactive movie starring Hulk Hogan, and Chris Lemmon, released on the Philips CD-i and MS-DOS. Based on the TV series with the same title, the game is a playable version of the two-part episode "The M.A.J.O.R. and the Minor", and video footage for the game was filmed at the same time as the episode itself. Thunder in Paradise was directed by Robert Weaver and designed and produced by David Riordan and David Todd.

== Gameplay ==
The episode's plot is divided into three events called "Encounters":

- Thunder Encounter

The player controls Thunder's powerful weapons to destroy as many threats to the boat as possible. This section of the game is somewhat like the arcade shooter "Paratrooper".

- Island Encounter

Very similar to other games like Mad Dog McCree, in which the player must shoot the enemies, before they shoot the player.

- Lab Encounter

It has the same feeling as "Island Encounter", but set in the laboratory. The way the encounter is played depends on the player's performance in the previous encounter.

There are two ways to experience Thunder in Paradise: "Interactive Television" lets the player take on the role of Zack in the show. Spence and Bru ask him for help, by playing three 'game encounters'. The better the player performs in a game encounter, the more bonus will carry forward to the next encounter. "Game Only" allows the player to choose one of the three 'game encounters'.

== Development ==
After seeing the pilot for Thunder, game director Robert Weaver pitched a story line to series producer Michael Berk. The footage for both the series episode and the game was filmed over 10–12 days using a 34-page linear script and a 134-page CD-I script, both written by Tom Greene.

== Reception ==
Destructoid gave a negative review of the title, emphasizing the tedious gameplay, poor cinematic cutscenes, and the routine insults delivered towards the player by Hulk Hogan and Chris Lemmon. Describing it, Zoey Handler stated "I was using all of my neurons to try and figure out what I was doing wrong, and it got me nowhere. I just kept getting told I'm an embarrassment by a guy who managed to combine a racist rant and sex tape in a single scandal". CD-i Magazine noted that the game is only worth playing if the user purchased the gun peripheral that was made for the title, otherwise to "avoid the game like the plague".

Reception

Review score
Publication	Score
CD-i	79%
