= Liberty Records =

US and UK record label

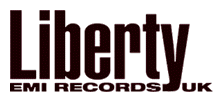
- Parent company: Transamerica Corporation (1968–1979); EMI (1979, 1996–2012); Thorn EMI (1979–1996); Universal Music Group (US catalog; 2012–present); Warner Music Group (UK catalogue; 2013–present)
- Founded: 1955
- Founder: Simon Waronker
- Status: Defunct
- Distributors: Capitol Records (US catalog); Parlophone (UK catalogue); Rhino Entertainment (US distribution of UK catalogue)
- Genre: Various
- Country of origin: U.S., UK
- Official website: universalmusic.com

Liberty Records was a record label founded in the United States by chairman Simon Waronker in 1955 with Alvin Bennett as president and Theodore Keep as chief engineer, all of whom served as the namesakes of Dave Seville’s creation The Chipmunks. It was reactivated in 2001 in the United Kingdom and had two previous revivals.

== History ==
=== 1950s ===
Liberty's early releases focused on film and orchestral music. Its first single was Lionel Newman's "The Girl Upstairs". Its first big hit, in 1955, was by Julie London singing her version of the torch song, "Cry Me a River", which climbed to No. 9 in the Billboard Hot 100. It helped Liberty sell her first album, Julie Is Her Name.

In 1956, Liberty signed Henry Mancini and released two singles and several albums by him. He left in 1958, signing with RCA Victor, where his record sales increased. Billy Rose and Lee David's song "Tonight You Belong to Me" reached number 4 (US) and number 28 (UK) when it was performed by teen sisters Patience and Prudence (McIntyre), selling over a million copies. Liberty also scored a Top 10 hit with Margie Rayburn's "I'm Available" and the singer went on to record two dozen singles for them.

The label's biggest rock singer was Eddie Cochran who starred in his second film, Untamed Youth. His first hit for the label was John D. Loudermilk's "Sittin' in the Balcony" in 1957, then came "Summertime Blues" and "C'mon Everybody".

The roster included R&B act Billy Ward and His Dominoes after Jackie Wilson quit, replacing him with ex-Lark Eugene Mumford. Their version of Hoagy Carmichael's 1927 song "Stardust" reached No. 13 in the Billboard Hot 100 and 13 on the UK Singles Chart in October 1957. It was the group's only million seller.

By 1958, Liberty was close to bankruptcy when singer-songwriter Ross Bagdasarian, performing as David Seville, had a number one hit with his novelty song "Witch Doctor". Later that year, he combined multi-track recording with the altered speed technique he had used in "Witch Doctor" and introduced the Chipmunks (Alvin, Simon, and Theodore—named after Liberty executives Bennett, Waronker, and Keep, respectively) in "The Chipmunk Song (Christmas Don't Be Late)". In the months leading to Christmas of 1958, the record went to number one on the Billboard Hot 100, becoming the first Christmas record to reach number 1 on that chart and selling 4.5 million copies.

Also in 1958, Liberty formed a sublabel called Freedom which lasted through 1959, when Liberty moved to its long-time address at 6920 Sunset Boulevard in Hollywood.

=== 1960s and 1970s ===
Liberty's most successful signing of the early 1960s was Bobby Vee, picking up "Suzie Baby", a single he recorded with the Shadows for Soma. He covered the Clovers' 1955 doo-wop ballad "Devil or Angel" in mid-1960 and later that year recorded Gene Pitney's "Rubber Ball", which made him an international star. In the summer of 1961 Vee had a hit with "Take Good Care of My Baby", which peaked at number one (US) and number 3 (UK). He had hits until 1970. Other acts on the roster were Willie Nelson, Jan and Dean, Johnny Burnette, Gene McDaniels, Del Shannon, Ralph Williams/The Marauders, Gary Lewis and the Playboys, Timi Yuro, and Vikki Carr. Snuff Garrett produced easy listening albums credited to "The 50 Guitars of Tommy Garrett". Liberty sent an annual report for the fiscal year ended 31 January 1962 that included a limited edition 33-1/3 vinyl record with songs by Bobby Vee, Timi Yuro, Gene McDaniels, Si Zentner, and Tommy Garrett. A welcome message recorded by Simon Waronker was also included.

In 1963, Liberty was sold to electronics corporation Avnet for $12 million. Avnet also bought Blue Note, Imperial, Dolton, Aladdin, and Minit. After two years of losses, Avnet sold the labels back to Al Bennett for $8 million. Liberty earlier acquired Pacific Jazz, founded in 1952. In 1966, Sunset was started to reissue records from the acquired labels. Sunset's catalog included Eddie Harris (The Explosive Eddie Harris), Jimmy Reed (Something Else), Les McCann (Django), Teddy Buckner (A Salute to Satchmo), Wild Bill Davis (Flying Home), Lester Young (Giant of Jazz), The Ventures (Supergroup), and Chet Baker (Swings Pretty).

Liberty recordings were distributed in the UK by the Decca group on London Records, then by EMI on Liberty. Liberty established a branch office in London, which signed the Bonzo Dog Band, Idle Race, and the Aynsley Dunbar Retaliation. After moving distribution to Philips in 1967, they returned to EMI in 1970. Liberty also signed the Searchers. In 1967, Liberty issued the first single by Family. Ron Kass, onetime president of Liberty, became the head of Apple, the label of the Beatles. Ron Bledsoe, assistant to Al Bennett, was picked by Clive Davis to run the Nashville branch of Columbia. In 1966 singer Johnny Rivers started another Liberty subsidiary, Soul City. The following year, Liberty discontinued the Dolton label and moved its catalog to the parent label. In 1967, Liberty signed Canned Heat, which had three hit singles for the label. In 1968, Liberty was bought for $24 million by Transamerica Corporation, an insurance company, and combined with United Artists. Two years later Imperial and Minit were shut down and transferred its catalog and artists to Liberty and United Artists. In 1970 Sugarloaf scored a top 10 hit in the United States with "Green-Eyed Lady", which reached number 3 on the Billboard chart. Sugarloaf would score again in 1975 with "Don't Call Us, We'll Call You" (US number 9).

In 1971, Liberty and its remaining labels (except for Soul City, whose catalog was sold to Bell and Blue Note) were shifted to United Artists, and Liberty was no more. In 1978, Artie Mogull and Jerry Rubinstein acquired United Artists and Liberty with money they borrowed from Capitol. In February 1979, Capitol's parent company EMI foreclosed on them and took over Liberty. Eight months later, Thorn Electrical Industries merged with EMI to form Thorn EMI.

=== 1980s and 1990s ===
Liberty Records logo 1991-1995

In 1980, EMI dropped the United Artists name and revived the Liberty name. EMI used Liberty to reissue the catalogs of United Artists, Liberty, and Imperial. From 1980 to 1984, Capitol used Liberty in America primarily as a country music label for acts such as Kenny Rogers and Dottie West, though heavy metal band Manowar was also signed to the company. In the United Kingdom, many new wave acts like The Stranglers were moved over to the 'new' label from United Artists (as Kirk Kerkorian had purchased the name for his film company) and were soon joined by new acts such as New Romantic band Classix Nouveaux. In 1991, Capitol-EMI renamed its Capitol Nashville label to Liberty before returning to the Capitol Nashville name four years later.

In 1994, Liberty president Jimmy Bowen founded a sister label called Patriot Records, whose roster included Bryan Austin, Lisa Brokop, John Berry, Deana Carter, John Bunzow, and Noah Gordon. After the label closed in 1995, Berry, Brokop, and Carter transferred to Capitol Nashville.

=== 2000s to 2010s ===
After releasing many late-1990s Europop acts like the Hermes House Band, EMI reformatted the label in 2001 to focus on 'heritage acts'. The label, operating in a similar sphere to that of rival Sanctuary, signed The Alarm (then branded as the Alarm MMVI) and Prefab Sprout, with the Stranglers releasing their first EMI album in over twenty years, Norfolk Coast, on the label in 2004. Liberty also licensed the Bangles' 2003 album Doll Revolution from their own indie label Down Kiddie! Records, distributing it in Canada and some European countries alongside the United Kingdom. The label later went into abeyance, never bringing out newer releases again.

== See also ==
- Nocturne Records
- Lists of record labels
