= La Vie en rose =

1947 song by Édith Piaf

Single by Édith Piaf

from the album Chansons Parisiennes
- B-side: "Un refrain courait dans la rue"
- Released: 1947
- Length: 3:06
- Label: Columbia
- Composer: Louiguy
- Lyricist: Édith Piaf

Édith Piaf singles chronology
"Les Trois Cloches" (1946)	"La Vie en rose" (1947)	"Si tu partais" (1947)

Live video
- "La Vie en rose" on YouTube

"La Vie en rose" (French for 'Life in pink'; pronounced [la vi ɑ̃ ʁoz]) is the signature song of French singer Édith Piaf, written in 1945, popularized in 1946, and released as a single in 1947. The song became popular in the United States in 1950, when seven versions reached the Billboard charts. These recordings were made by Tony Martin, Paul Weston, Bing Crosby (recorded 22 June 1950), Ralph Flanagan, Victor Young, Dean Martin, and Louis Armstrong.

A version in 1977 by Grace Jones was also an international hit.

== Background and release ==
The song's title can be translated as "Life in happy hues", "Life seen through rose-coloured glasses", or "Life in rosy hues"; its literal meaning is "Life in Pink".

The lyrics of the song were written by Piaf, with music composed by Louiguy, and is registered with SACEM. It was probably Robert Chauvigny who completed the music. When Piaf suggested to Marguerite Monnot that she sing the piece, the latter rejected "that foolishness". It was eventually Louiguy who accepted authorship of the music. The song was broadcast live before being recorded. Piaf offered the song to Marianne Michel, who modified the lyrics slightly, changing "les choses" ("things") for "la vie" ("life"). In 1943, Piaf had performed at a nightclub/bordello called "La Vie en Rose". Initially, Piaf's peers and songwriting team did not think the song would be successful, finding it weaker than the rest of her repertoire. Heeding their advice, the singer put the song aside, only to change her mind the next year. It was performed live in concert for the first time in 1946. It became a favorite with audiences. "La Vie en rose" was the song that made Piaf internationally famous, its lyrics expressing the joy of finding true love and appealing to those who had endured the hardships of World War II.

"La Vie en rose" was released on a 10-inch single in 1947 by Columbia Records, a division of EMI, with "Un refrain courait dans la rue" making the B-side. It met with a warm reception and sold a million copies in the United States. It was the best-selling single of 1948 in Italy, and the ninth best-selling single in Brazil in 1949. Piaf performed the song in the 1948 French movie Neuf garçons, un cœur. The first of her albums to include "La Vie en rose" was the 10-inch Chansons Parisiennes, released in 1950. It appeared on most of Piaf's subsequent albums, and on numerous greatest hits compilations. It went on to become her signature song and her trademark hit, ranking with "Milord" and "Non, Je Ne Regrette Rien" among her best-known and most recognizable tunes. Encouraged by its success, Piaf wrote eighty more songs in her career.

English lyrics were written by Mack David, and numerous versions were recorded in the United States in 1950. The recordings that charted were by Tony Martin (reached the No. 9 position in the Billboard chart), Paul Weston (No. 12 position), Bing Crosby (No. 13 position), Édith Piaf (No. 23 position), Ralph Flanagan (No. 27 position) and Victor Young (No. 27 position). Louis Armstrong recorded C'est si bon and La Vie en rose in New York City with Sy Oliver and his Orchestra on 26 June 1950, which reached the No. 28 position on the Billboard chart and was certified silver in the United Kingdom in 2023. Bing Crosby also recorded the song in French in 1953 for his album Le Bing: Song Hits of Paris. A version titled "Take Me To Your Heart Again" by Vince Hill reached #18 in Canada, March 14, 1966.

In the 1958 film Música de siempre, Piaf performs a Spanish version of the song.

The song received a Grammy Hall of Fame Award in 1998.

== Track listings ==
- 10-inch single (1947)
1. "La Vie en rose"
2. "Un refrain courait dans la rue"

== Chart performance ==
Chart	Peak position
France (SNEP)	168
US Billboard Hot 100	23

== Grace Jones version ==
"La Vie en rose"

Single by Grace Jones

from the album Portfolio
- B-side: "I Need a Man"; "Tomorrow"; "Send in the Clowns"
- Released: October 1977
- Genre: Bossa nova; disco
- Length: 7:27 (album version); 3:35 (single version)
- Label: Island
- Songwriters: Édith Piaf; Louiguy; Mack David
- Producer: Tom Moulton

Grace Jones singles chronology
"Sorry" / "That's the Trouble" (1976)	"La Vie en rose" (1977)	"Do or Die" (1978)

Music video
- "La Vie en rose" on YouTube

=== Background and release ===
Grace Jones covered "La Vie en rose" in 1977 for her debut studio album Portfolio. It was the third and the last single from that album, and at the same time, her first single release on Island Records after having signed with the label.

The single version was heavily edited from its original album version. Jones's fairly radical bossa nova interpretation of Édith Piaf's signature tune became her first international hit single and a staple of her repertoire. It was later performed as part of her 1981 A One Man Show, then the only track from her disco era to be included in the show. In Spain and Mexico the track was billed as "La Vida en Rosa" on the 7-inch single release, although it was not a Spanish language version of the song. Jones's recording of "La Vie en rose" was later re-released a number of times in the early 1980s and finally reached number 12 in the UK charts when re-released as a double A-side with "Pull Up to the Bumper" in 1985. The single was certified Gold in France and Italy.

Jones said about the song, "That's a very special song to me. Oh God, I cry every time I sing it. I had quite a few French lovers, so every time I sing it I think about them."

The music video for the song was made using the chroma key technique. It presents Jones dancing and singing the song with the famous 1978 montage of herself in the background, which was later used for the cover of her 1985 Island Life compilation. The video begins with Jones wearing a rose-patterned coat. Having removed it, the singer dances in a scanty gold dress which reveals her right nipple as well as black underwear.

=== Track listing ===
French 7-inch single (1977)/ Dutch 7-inch single (1977)

A. "La Vie en rose" (single version) – 3:35
B. "I Need a Man" (album version) – 3:25

Italian 7-inch single (1977)

A. "La Vie en rose" (single version) – 3:35
B. "Tomorrow" (album version) – 5:47

Dutch 12-inch single (1980)

A. "La Vie en rose" (album version) – 7:27
B. "I Need a Man" (album version) – 3:25

=== Chart performance ===
Chart (1977–83)	Peak position
Belgium (Ultratop 50 Flanders)	13
Belgium (Ultratop 50 Wallonia)	27
Canada Dance/Urban (RPM)	28
Canada Top Singles (RPM)	87
France (IFOP)	3
Italy (Musica e dischi)	3
Spain (AFYVE)	20
Netherlands (Dutch Top 40)	4
Netherlands (Single Top 100)	4
US Bubbling Under Hot 100 (Billboard)	9
US Dance Club Songs (Billboard) "What I Did for Love"/"Tomorrow"/"La Vie en Rose"	10
Chart (2013)	Peak position
France (SNEP)	192

=== Certifications and sales ===
Region	Certification	Certified units/sales
Canada	—	75,000
France	—	100,000
Italy (FIMI)	Gold	1,000,000

=== Release history ===
Release dates and formats for "La Vie en rose"
Region	Date	Label(s)	Format(s)	Cat. No.	Ref.
United Kingdom	November 1977	Island Records	7-inch; 12-inch	WIP 6415; IPR 2004	
France	December 1977	Island Records	7-inch	6172 530	

== Louis Armstrong version ==
=== Certifications ===
Region	Certification	Certified units/sales
Spain (Promusicae)	Gold	30,000^{‡}
United Kingdom (BPI)	Silver	200,000^{‡}
^{‡} Sales+streaming figures based on certification alone.

== Appearances and references in media ==
- Denise Darcel sang La Vie en Rose, the first time it appeared on screen, in the 1948 film To the Victor.
- Grace Jones’ version plays over the closing credits of Robert Altman’s 1994 film Prêt-à-Porter.
- The 2007 film La Vie en Rose, a biopic of Piaf’s life, is named in reference to the song.
- The 2008 Disney/Pixar film WALL-E features the Louis Armstrong version play over a romantic montage in the movie and is featured on the original motion picture soundtrack released by Walt Disney Records.
- Lady Gaga performs the song in the 2018 film, A Star is Born and its accompanying soundtrack album.
- The 2026 Marvel Televsion Special Presentation, The Punisher: One Last Kill, set in the Marvel Cinematic Universe, features the Louis Armstrong version of the song over a montage of violence.
