= Green-Eyed Lady =

Single by Sugarloaf

from the album Sugarloaf
- B-side: "West of Tomorrow"
- Released: August 1970
- Genre: Progressive rock; hard rock; jazz rock; psychedelic rock
- Length: 6:53 (album version); 5:58 (long single version); 2:58 (radio edit); 3:33 (short single version)
- Label: Liberty Records
- Songwriters: Jerry Corbetta, J.C. Phillips & David Riordan
- Producer: Frank Slay

Sugarloaf singles chronology
"Green-Eyed Lady" (1970)	"Tongue in Cheek" (1971)

"Green-Eyed Lady" is a popular single by the American rock band Sugarloaf. Written by Jerry Corbetta, J.C. Phillips and David Riordan, it was featured on the band's debut album, Sugarloaf and was their first single. It peaked at number three on the Billboard Hot 100 in 1970 and was RPM magazine's number one single for two weeks. It has been featured on dozens of compilation albums.

The song was written about Corbetta's girlfriend, Kathy Peacock, who was from Denver. The other guys in the band referred to her as Corbetta's green-eyed lady.

== Single versions ==
The single was released in the United States in three different versions sharing the same catalog number (Liberty 56183), but different matrix numbers on the record labels. The original single release (LB-2860-S) was a 5:58 version with no edits but an early fadeout, almost immediately after the last verse. This was edited down to 2:58 on the mono/stereo promotional single (LB-2860-DJ/LB-2860-S-DJ) for radio airplay in which the entire organ and guitar solos are edited out. When "Green-Eyed Lady" started climbing the charts, the recording was reworked one last time to include a shortened piece of the organ/guitar break on a single (LB-2860-S-RE) that has become the common 3:33 version used by radio stations today. Aside from other minor edits, the two shorter tracks begin with the opening's third bar and also end with early fadeouts. The album version ended with a cadence in the organ.

== Critical reception ==
"Green-Eyed Lady" received generally positive reviews. John Laycock of the Windsor Star called it a "bewitching single".

== Chart performance ==
=== Weekly charts ===
Chart (1970)	Peak position
Australia Go-Set	53
Canada RPM Top Singles	1
U.S. Billboard Hot 100	3

=== Year-end charts ===
Chart (1970)	Rank
Canada	13
U.S. Billboard	30
