= David Riordan =

American media executive and songwriter

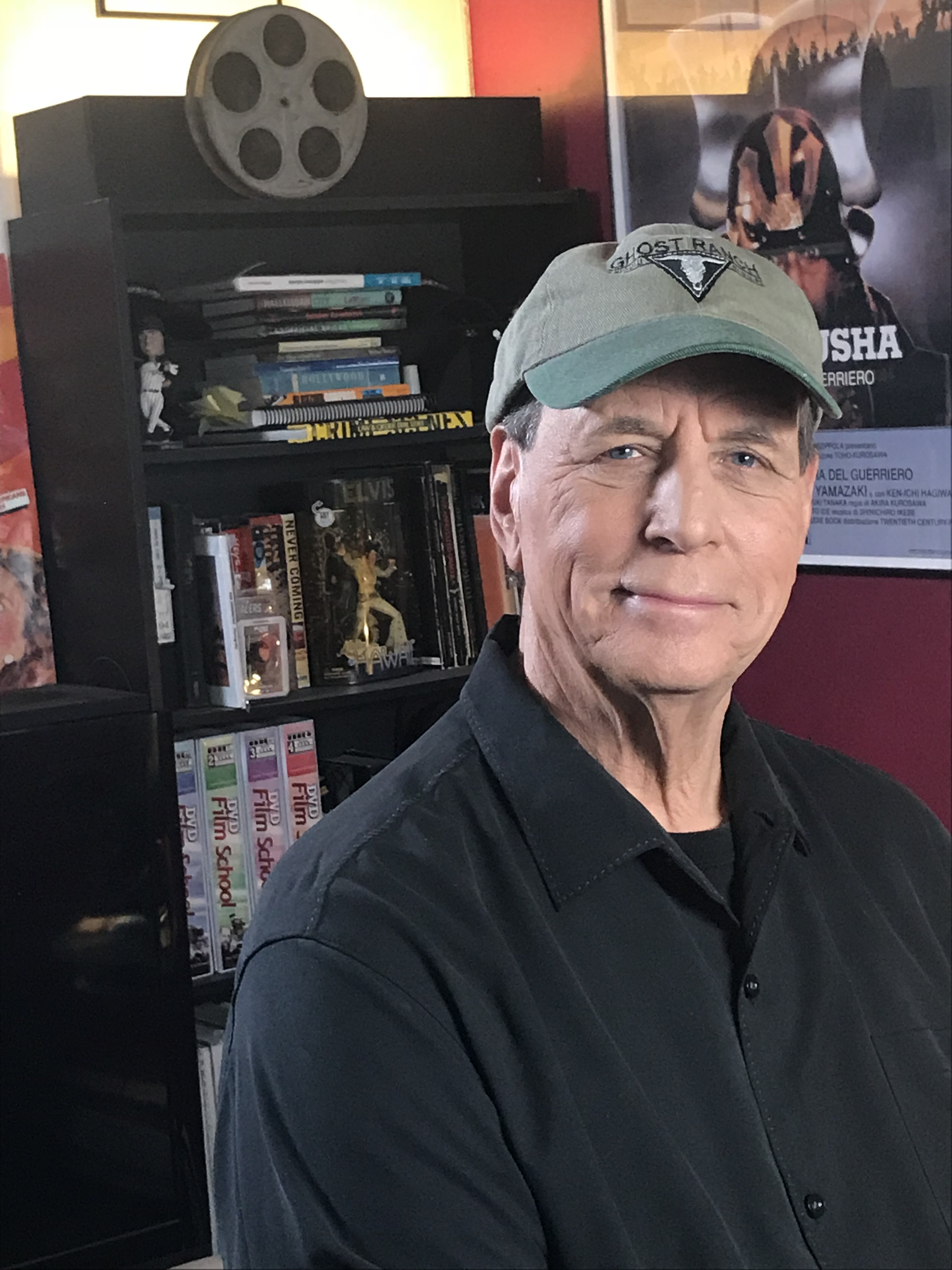
- Occupation(s): Interactive media executive, documentary television producer, songwriter

David Riordan is an interactive media executive, producer and designer, a documentary television producer and a professional songwriter. He co-wrote the number-one hit "Green-Eyed Lady" for the band Sugarloaf in 1970, and released his first solo album in 1974 called Medicine Wheel. In the early 1980s, while working as a consultant for Lucasfilm, producer of the Star Wars franchise, he began his career as an interactive media designer, producer and director that continued until the late 1990s. During that time he directed interactive entertainment groups for Cinemaware, Philips Media, Time Warner and Disney. He later became a producer for television shows that appeared on the A&E network, was the VP of media at Integral Life and the director of the Ken Wilber Biography Project. Riordan is currently the director of Story Studio TV, a convergence transmedia company.

== Music career ==
Riordan began his recording career in 1968, as a member of the Yankee Dollar, singing vocals, playing guitar and writing songs for the band's debut album, Yankee Dollar. In 1970 he was a songwriter on the Sugarloaf albums Sugarloaf in 1970, Spaceship Earth in 1972, and I Got a Song in 1973. On the band's debut album, Riordan was the co-writer of the number one hit song "Green-Eyed Lady". He next was a performing member of the group Sweet Pain and songwriter for the group's debut album, Sweet Pain. In 1974 he performed and wrote songs for the band's second album, Sweet Pain II. That year he also released his only solo album, on Capitol Records. Billboard reviewed the album positively upon its release in November 1974, and charted the album among the top fifteen albums with major rotation on the leading progressive radio stations in the US for several weeks. He recorded albums for the record and film companies Capitol Records, United Artists, 20th Century Fox, and Dot Records. Eventually his catalogue reached over 100 songs, and was purchased by Paul McCartney's publishing company MPL Publishing.

== Video games and interactive movies ==
In 1983 and 1984, Riordan was involved in the design of the video game Ballblazer, which was the first game developed between Lucasfilm's and Atari's new partnership and Lucasfilm's first ever video game collaboration. He also served as producer for the Laserdisc arcade game Freedom Fighter, which used mostly original anime footage based on designs from the films Galaxy Express 999 and Adieu Galaxy Express 999. Later in the 1980s Riordan designed It Came from the Desert for Cinemaware. He became one of the lead directors and producers for the company Cinemaware during the 1980s, before founding Philips P.O.V. Entertainment Group for Philips Media in 1991.

In 1993 he was the designer of the game Voyeur. Voyeur was featured on the cover of Time magazine's September 27, 1993, issue entitled "Attack of the Video Games", featuring the most popular video game titles of the early 1990s—alongside Mario, Sonic, Mortal Kombat, and others. In 1995 he was the designer and writer for the game Thunder in Paradise, an interactive game featuring Hulk Hogan. That year he also served as director of the game Caesars World of Boxing. The game won the Best Sports game award at Cybermania '94, broadcast on national television. Voyeur was also the winner of the awards for Best Female Actor (Grace Zabriskie), Best Male Actor (Robert Culp), and other Philips CD-i products that Riordan had directed also won awards, such as Best Comedy winner The Wacky World of Miniature Golf, and two others. Riordan's products won a total of six awards at this inaugural ceremony.

Up until 1994 he served as Philips POV creative director, and by 1995 he had become vice president of production for the entertainment division of Time Warner Interactive, where his vision for the future of gaming included a transition to narratives with more positive imagery, in addition to the coupling of video games with the release of studio recordings and the inclusion of Time Warner bands on the game soundtracks. During the 1990s he also directed the Interactive Entertainment Studio for Disney. In 1998 he was also director for the game Of Light and Darkness, which featured actor James Woods. Over his career he was credited for producing, designing or directing over twenty video games and interactive movies.

== Television ==
Riordan was a consulting producer and lead web producer for episodes of the reality television show Random 1 between 2005 and 2006. He was also executive producer for the 2007 television documentary Lost in Woonsocket. Both television programs aired on the A&E network.

== Web media publishing ==
In 2001, Riordan was the managing editor of the One World Journeys website, which published photo-documentaries of eco-expeditions in environmentally sensitive regions. From 2007 to 2018 he was the vice president of media for Integral Life responsible for creating personal development programming, documentaries and public conferences. He is currently the director of Story Studio TV, a convergence transmedia company creating television and web programming.

His work on the "evolution of intelligence" is located at: www.evointell.tv.
