= Jerry Corbetta =

American singer-songwriter

Gerald Anthony James Corbetta
- Born: Gerald Anthony James Corbetta; September 23, 1947; Denver, Colorado
- Died: September 16, 2016 (aged 68) Denver, Colorado
- Genres: rock, psychedelic rock
- Occupations: singer-songwriter; record producer
- Instruments: Vocals, Keyboard, Organ

Gerald Anthony James Corbetta (September 23, 1947 – September 16, 2016) was an American singer-songwriter, keyboardist and organist, record producer, best known as a frontman for the Colorado rock band Sugarloaf, best known for their classic rock hit "Green-Eyed Lady".

Corbetta also toured for nearly five years with Frankie Valli and the Four Seasons as the "fifth season" nicknamed "Guido" by Frankie Valli.

== Biography ==
Corbetta was born on September 23, 1947, in Denver, Colorado. He began his career locally playing drums. As a teenager, he started playing keyboards and joined a few Denver-based bands. The Moonrakers was one of them, and in '67-'68 Jerry led a locally popular five-piece band "The Half Doesn't" that drew crowds in Denver's "3.2" beer bars like the "La Pichet" that served up 3.2% / low-alcohol beer and live music to Colorado's 18-year-olds.

In 1968, Corbetta and guitarist Bob Webber formed the band Chocolate Hair, along with drummer Myron Pollock and bassist Bob Raymond. The band, upon signing to Liberty Records, changed the name to Sugarloaf. The singles "Green-Eyed Lady" and "Don't Call Us, We'll Call You" hit the Billboard Hot 100, No. 3 in 1970, and No. 9 in 1975 respectively, while their eponymous debut album (1970) reached No. 24 on the Billboard 200 album charts. Both "Green-Eyed Lady" and "Don't Call Us, We'll Call You" were co-written by Corbetta.

He fronted Sugarloaf through 1978. In early 1980s, he joined Frankie Valli and the Four Seasons as their singer and musical director, and remained with them through 1984. At one time, he was also a keyboardist of a gathering of 1960s and 1970s artists, the Classic Rock All-Stars.

During his career, he played organs with Velvet Chain (their Asteroid Belt album). He co-wrote "You're Lookin' Like Love to Me", along with Bob Crewe, included on the 1983 Born to Love studio album of duets between Peabo Bryson and Roberta Flack. Corbetta also co-wrote "Come Back to My Love", along with Bob Gaudio, recorded by Eric Carmen, and included on his 1984 eponymous album. Most notable is the Dance Club Songs chart hit, "On Your Knees" by Grace Jones (No. 28 in 1979), written by D.C. LaRue and Corbetta.

In 1993 Jerry contributed a song and performance to the Christian VHS series 'You Can't Fool Me'. He was featured lip syncing and playing along with a keytar to the song. Although 'You Can't Fool Me' was intended to be a series, only the first volume was released.

In 2012 Sugarloaf was inducted into the Colorado Music Hall of Fame.

Corbetta had been diagnosed with Pick's disease in 2010; treatment forced him to retire. He died from the disease in a hospice in Denver, Colorado on September 16, 2016, at the age of 68.

== Solo discography ==
- Jerry Corbetta (1978)
