= I Need a Man (Grace Jones song) =

Single by Grace Jones

from the album Portfolio
- B-side: "Again and Again"
- Released: 1975
- Genre: Disco; funk
- Length: 3:22
- Label: Orfeus; Beam Junction
- Songwriters: Paul Adrian Slade; Pierre Papadiamandis
- Producer: Tom Moulton

Grace Jones singles chronology
"I Need a Man" (1975)	"Sorry" / "That's the Trouble" (1976)

"I Need a Man" is the debut single by Grace Jones, released in 1975 through Beam Junction. It was re-released in 1977, and reached number 83 on the US Billboard Hot 100 and topped the US Dance Club Songs chart.

== Background ==
"I Need a Man" was the debut single for Grace Jones, originally recorded and released in France for the label Orfeus while Jones was still working as a fashion model. It is a disco and funk song. Its initial release passed fairly unnoticed. The track was later re-mixed and released in the U.S. on the minor disco label Beam Junction before Jones signed with Island Records and included it on her 1977 debut album Portfolio. "I Need a Man" then became a modest hit, reaching number 1 spot on the Billboard dance chart. It also contributed to Jones' growing popularity among gay scene.

According to Jones, the original writer of the song, Paul Slade, was an "anonymous, hardworking session guy" who had been writing English lyrics for French singers who wanted to sing in English. Jones claimed to have helped write the words for "I Need a Man" but was not credited as co-writer.

The original mix of "I Need a Man", together with its B-side, "Again and Again", remain unreleased on CD.

== Reception ==
Billboard magazine felt "I Need Man" was "just as strong, if not stronger than the singer's last double-sided hit", with "much energy and drive".

=== Awards and nominations ===
Year	Awards	Work	Category	Result	Ref.
1977	Billboard Disco Awards	"I Need a Man"	Heavy Disco/Light Radio (Single of the Year)	Nominated	
1977	Billboard Disco Awards	"I Need a Man"	Disco DJ's Favorite 12" Disc	Nominated	

== Music video ==
The music video for the song was made using the chroma key technique and presents Jones wearing a white, knee-length plain dress, dancing to the track.

== Track listings ==
- 7" single (1975)

A. "I Need a Man" – 3:15
B. "Again and Again" – 3:46

- 12" single (1977)

A. "I Need a Man" (disco mix) – 7:30
B. "I Need a Man" (instrumental version) – 4:53

- UK 7" single (1977)

A. "I Need a Man" – 3:29
B. "I Need a Man" (Part 2) – 4:17

== Chart performance ==
=== Weekly Charts ===
Chart performance for "I Need a Man"
Chart (1976–1977)	Peak position
Belgium (Ultratop 50 Wallonia)	19
US Billboard Hot 100	83
US Dance Club Songs (Billboard)	1

Chart performance for "I Need a Man" (2015 Vinyl reissue)
Chart (2015–2017)	Peak Position
UK Physical Singles Chart (OCC)	42
UK Vinyl Singles Chart (OCC)	30

=== Year-end charts ===
Year-end chart performance for "I Need a Man"
Chart (1977)	Position
US Disco Audience Response (Billboard)	11

== Cover versions ==
- American hi-NRG group Man 2 Man recorded a cover version of "I Need a Man" in 1987. This version received peaked at No. 43 on the UK Singles Chart.
