= Jack Robinson (songwriter) =

American songwriter and a music publisher

Jack Robinson (born January 17, 1938) is an American songwriter and a music publisher.

== Life and career ==
Robinson was born in Seattle, Washington, United States. He grew up in a musical family; his father was an amateur violinist, his mother a professional singer. Robinson's three uncles and his aunt were professional musicians. His father, Bert, was English, his mother, Rena, Canadian. He studied journalism and American literature at the University of Washington.

He began his professional career as a journalist in Seattle, then moved to Bellingham, Washington, San Francisco, California, Carson City, Nevada and finally, after serving in the United States Marines, Robinson moved to Paris, where he worked as a foreign correspondent with the United Press International.

Robinson became a disc jockey on Radio Luxembourg. He dropped his news work to become a professional manager (directeur artistique) in an American publishing company which, among others, had just signed The Rolling Stones and The Who. The job of a professional manager is to take songs from the publishers' catalog and to find new writers and present songs to artists and record producers. Robinson then decided he would become a record producer. It was at that time he met and began working with Georges Chatelain who had formed the most advanced studio in France with Bernard Estardy. Chatelain took the time to not only explain the technical side of a recording studio, and showed Robinson sound recording and reproduction techniques. Robinson, Chatelain and Estardy went on to produce seven Top 10 hits with their artists Gilles Marchal and Martine Habib.

Robinson co-produced King Harvest, that had been signed by fellow producer Pierre Jaubert. Their recording of "Dancing in the Moonlight" became a Top 10 hit in America and has remained a standard for over 50 years. "Dancing in the Moonlight" became the theme song for Fidelity Investments television commercials for three years.

In 1973, Robinson founded Robin Song Music, his publishing company which is now in partnership with the French office of Peermusic. He went on to write lyrics to the music of the French singer/composer David Christie. Their biggest hits: "I Love to Love (But My Baby Loves to Dance)", "Love Me Like a Lover" and "Rendezvous" (Tina Charles); "Saddle Up" (David Christie); "Strut Your Funky Stuff" (Frantique); "(If You Want It) Do It Yourself" (Gloria Gaynor); and "Do or Die" (Grace Jones). Robinson also wrote the original, English lyrics to Princess Stéphanie of Monaco's hit, "Irresistible". Early after the creation of Robin Song Music, Robinson had the privilege of working with the late Roy Robinson, then lead singer and co-songwriter of the Anglo Norwegian group, Titanic. The group scored hits with "Sultana" and "Macumba".

In 1997, he co-produced Meredith Brooks' album, See It through My Eyes.

Robinson is currently working with the English theatrical producer Julie Clare on a musical comedy. Robinson wrote the original libretto and lyrics. Clare has contributed to the rewrite for the British stage and will produce the musical, Walking The Dogs.

Robinson has two children, David, a lawyer and amateur pianist in Los Angeles, and Rachel, a piano teacher (and former lawyer) in Paris. He is married to Catherine Tchakotine and lives in Paris and Normandy.
