= David Christie (singer) =

French singer

David Christie (1 January 1948 – 11 May 1997) was a French singer. Born Jacques Pepino in Tarare, Rhône in eastern France. He also used the pseudonyms James Bolden and Napoleon Jones. He is best known for the hits "Saddle Up" (1982) and "I Love to Love (But My Baby Loves to Dance)", which are included on various 1980s compilation albums.

As a composer working with lyricist Jack Robinson, Christie, using the name James Bolden, wrote songs that have sold more than 50 million records around the world. Their hits include: "I Love to Love (But My Baby Loves to Dance)", "Love Me Like a Lover" and "Rendezvous" (Tina Charles); "Saddle Up" (David Christie); "Strut Your Funky Stuff" (Frantique); "(If You Want It) Do It Yourself" (Gloria Gaynor); and "Do or Die" (Grace Jones).

In 1973, Christie had his first child, Nathalie, with Françoise Richard. He later had a second daughter, Julia, born of his relationship with the singer Nina Morato. Christie died by suicide in 1997 in Capbreton, following the accidental death of his 11-year-old daughter Julia.

== Discography ==
=== Albums ===
- 1974: Never Alone
- 1975: Napoleon Jones featuring David Christie
- 1977: Love is the Most Important Thing
- 1978: Back Fire
- 1980: Flashback
- 1982: Back in Control
- 1984: Stress

=== Singles ===
- "Israel"
- "Julie
- "Our First Child"
- "For a Little Heart"
- "You are the God Child"
- "Always the Same Rumba"
- "Lazy Love"
- "Falling in Love in Summertime"
- "Love is the Most Important Thing"
- "Paris by Night"
- "Do Not Stop Me, I Like It"
- "I Love to Love (But My Baby Loves to Dance)"
- "Saddle Up" (1982)
- "Rally Down to Sally's"
- "Our Time Has Come"
- "Stress"
- "Cindy Lou"
- "Living It Up"
- "Chain of Love"
- "Holidays Capbreton"
- "Saddle Up 1990"
- "Saddle Up 1993"
