= Richard Bernstein (artist) =

American artist

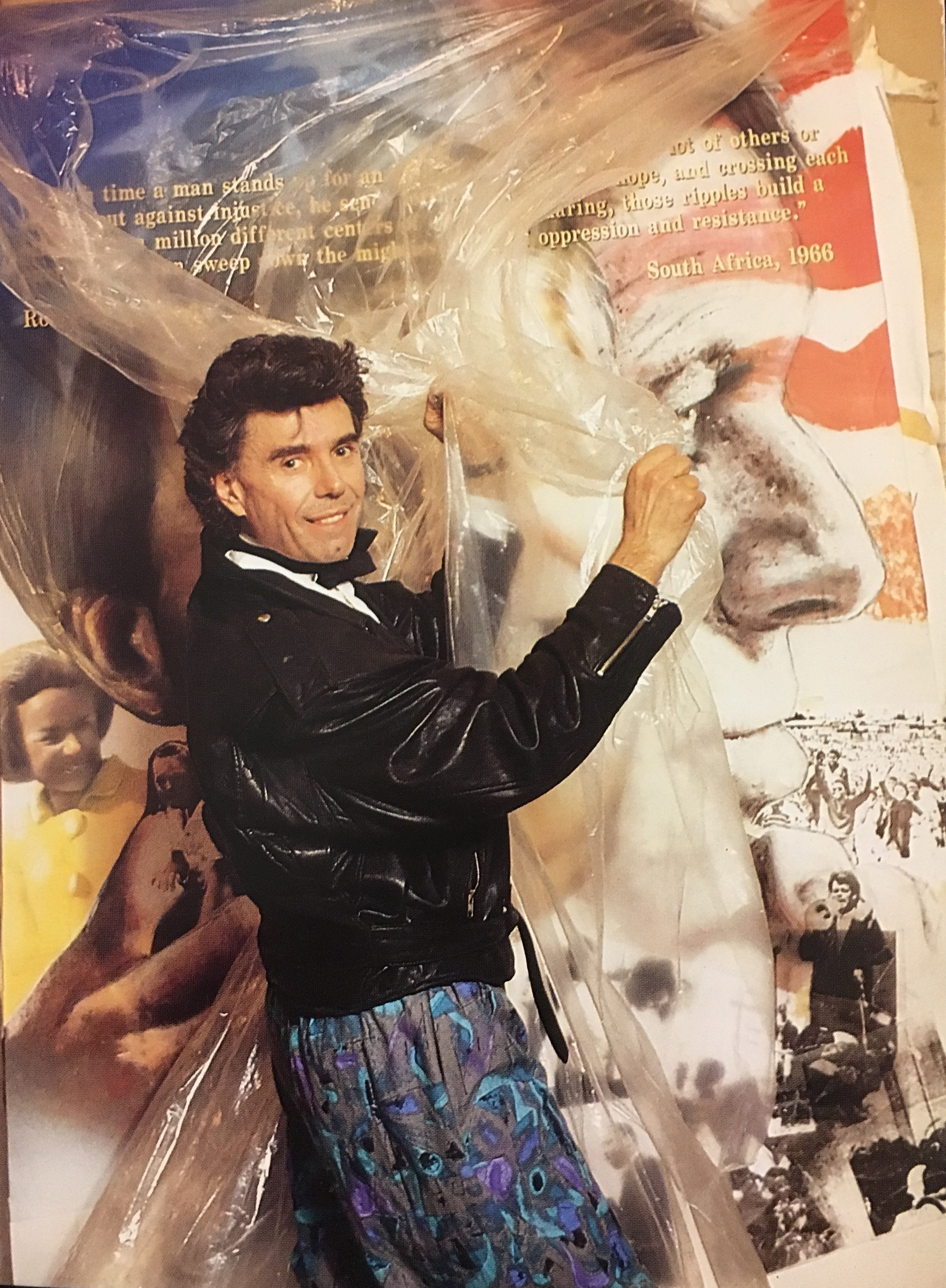
- Born: Richard Fredrick Bernstein; October 31, 1939; New York City, U.S.
- Died: October 18, 2002 (aged 62); New York City, U.S.
- Resting place: Mount Ararat Cemetery
- Education: Pratt Institute (BFA); Columbia University (MFA)
- Occupation: Artist
- Website: richardbernsteinart.com

Richard Frederick Bernstein (October 31, 1939 – October 18, 2002) was an American artist associated with pop art and the circle of Andy Warhol. From 1972 to 1989, he was the cover artist for Interview magazine.

== Life and career ==
=== Early life and education ===
Bernstein was born on October 31, 1939, in New York City to a family with an older brother, David and younger sister, Ellen. His father, Herbert Bernstein, was a clothing manufacturer and his mother, Florence, was a homemaker. His mother first took him to the Museum of Modern Art children's school, where he saw works by Piet Mondrian, Pablo Picasso, and other artists. Bernstein received a bachelor's degree in fine arts from the Pratt Institute and M.F.A. from Columbia University, studying with Richard Lindner.

=== Career ===
In 1965, Bernstein had his first one-man exhibition at The Terrain Gallery in New York. It was there that he was introduced to Andy Warhol by David Bourdon of the Village Voice. Later, Bernstein exhibited in the Byron Gallery Box Show alongside Warhol, Rosenquist, Lictenstein, and more. He moved to Paris in 1966 and presented at the Iris Clert Gallery in Paris, Axiom Gallery in London, the Gallery Barozzi in Venice, the Gallery Monet in Amsterdam, and the Nancy Hoffman Gallery in New York City.

In 1968, Bernstein moved into the Hotel Chelsea and was immersed into nightlife scene at venues such as Max's Kansas City. By the early 1970s, he gained recognition for his portraits of rock stars. In 1972, Andy Warhol asked Bernstein to create the covers for Andy Warhol's Interview magazine and he became part of the Warhol milieu. Andy had often said that "Bernstein is my favorite artist. He makes everyone look so famous."

In the introduction to Megastar, a 1984 compilation of Bernstein's Interview covers, Paloma Picasso observed, "Richard Bernstein portrays stars. He celebrates their faces, he gives them larger-than-fiction size. He puts wit into the beauties, fantasy into the rich, depth into the glamorous and adds instant patina to newcomers."

Bernstein was commissioned by the World Federation of United Nations to create a UN postage stamp in 1990.

== Personal life ==
Although Bernstein was gay, he was engaged to photographer Berry Berenson. When she had an affair with actor Anthony Perkins in 1972, Bernstein was devastated and he went on a drinking and drug binge. "She left me, and I thought my world was crashing down. I made stupid attempts in the following week or so. One day I would send her the garden of Eden, a tremendous box of flowers, and the next day I would want to send her a little canary, dead in a shoe box. But I didn't. It was very painful," he said.

== Death ==
On October 18, 2002, Bernstein died of complications of AIDS at his apartment at the Hotel Chelsea at the age of 62. He is buried in Mount Ararat Cemetery in Farmingdale, New York.

== Legacy ==
In 2018, the Estate of Richard Bernstein produced the book Richard Bernstein Starmaker: Andy Warhol's Cover Artist, by Roger Padilha and Mauricio Padilha published by Rizzoli.

Coach x Richard Bernstein SS20 collection debuted in September 2019 at New York Fashion Week and was dubbed "The Most Instagrammed Moment" of fashion week. The collection was a tremendous success for Coach. The Estate has also had high profile collaborations with Loewe, Henzel Studio Rug, The Ritz Carlton, Stubbs & Wootton among others.

His works have recently been shown at The Brooklyn Museum, The Andy Warhol Museum, Musee de la Musique, Nottingham Contemporary Museum, and more.

== Museum collections ==
- MoMA, New York
- Metropolitan Museum of Art, New York
- Hirshhorn Museum. Washington, D.C.
- Stedelijk Museum, Amsterdam
- Foundation Vincent Van Gogh Arles, France
- National Portrait Gallery, Washington, D.C.
- Yale University Art Gallery
- Los Angeles County Museum of Art
