= D.C. LaRue =

American singer, songwriter and producer (born 1948)

D.C. LaRue (born David Charles L'Heureux; April 26, 1948, in Meriden, Connecticut) is an American singer, songwriter and producer. His music was successful in clubs and on dance music charts worldwide during the 1970s and early 1980s.

== History ==
LaRue's first recording was the 1974 Kirshner Records single "Honey Bear (The Good Time's Right Here)." A second one-off single, 1975's "Move In Closer," was on the Claridge Records imprint. Neither single charted. However the following year LaRue's luck changed with the 1976 album Ca-the-drals. The Pyramid Records album rose to #-123 on "Billboard's Hot 200". The double A-side 12" single of "Ca-the-drals" (backed with fellow artist/drummer Pat Lundy's "Day By Day/My Sweet Lord") was one of the earliest commercially available 12" singles. "Ca-the-drals/Deep Dark Delicious Night" would hit #-1 on "Billboard's Dance Music/Club Play" chart. "Ca-the-drals" would also hit #-2 on "Billboard's Disco Singles" chart and #-94 on "Billboard's Hot 100" chart.

In less than a year LaRue began work on his second album, The Tea Dance. The 1977 concept album capturing the essence and feel of a Broadway show featured such notable background singers as Lani Groves and Sharon Redd. It also included a duet with 1960s rock/pop icon Lou Christie on "Don't Keep It In The Shadows." The tracks: "Face Of Love," "Overture," "O Ba Ba (No Reino Da Mae Do Ouro)," "Indiscreet" and "Don't Keep It In The Shadows" would all chart at #-2 on "Billboard's Dance Music/Club Play" chart. "Indiscreet" would go one to become one of the more important and influential hip hop break tracks of the old skool hip hop eras.

Despite the brisk sales of both of LaRue's albums, Pyramid Records folded operations in the USA in 1978. With the success of those albums, he was signed (and these albums licensed) to Casablanca Records & Filmworks in 1978. His first release on his new label was "Do You Want The Real Thing?" The single was included on the platinum selling soundtrack album for the movie Thank God It's Friday. That same year saw LaRue release his third album Confessions. Once again he scored a hit with it which hit #12 on "Billboard's Dance Music/Club Play" chart and included "Let Them Dance". Also in 1978 LaRue had a cameo in the ill-fated movie Sgt. Pepper's Lonely Hearts Club Band.

In 1979 he released his fourth album Forces Of The Night. The singles "On With The Dance" (a duet with Michelle Aller) and "Hot Jungle Drums And Voodoo Rhythm" were released and the album charted at #-72 on "Billboard's Dance Music/Club Play" chart. The album also featured a duet with Rita Moreno on "Have A Good Time." "Hot Jungle Drums And Voodoo Rhythm" was also included on the platinum selling compilation A Night at Studio 54.

In 1980 he released his fifth and final album Star Baby. The album retained the spark and ingenuity that had been prevalent in his earlier releases but with the end of the disco era it failed to chart. The album featured another duet with Lou Christie "Into The Ozone" and the 12" single of "So Much For L.A."/"Boys Can't Fake It."

In 2006 his "Ca-the-drals" was sampled in England on the track "3 AM" by Moto Blanco (Bobby Blanco & Miki Moto.) The highly successful track would introduce LaRue and his music to a whole new generation. That same year LaRue released Wicked Youth (Selected Performances 1976-1984) from his own website. Besides rare edits of his previous hits the disc also included the previously mentioned "3 AM," "Good Morning, My Love" (with The Boys Choir Of Harlem), "Love Can Make You Strong" (another duet with Lou Christie previously unreleased) and "Edge Of The Night" (with Adam Goldstone.)

In 2010, LaRue recorded the new track "Crash And Burn" for the Ian Levine produced compilation album Northern Soul: 2010.

In February 2012, LaRue returned with "More Things Change." A Nu Disco genre track he did with artist/producer Jimmy Michaels. As of 2012 LaRue has been the host of his own radio show "Disco Juice" on Newtown Radio. Tributes, themed shows as well as interviews of famed disco artists are his format on the Saturday night show.

== Albums ==
- Ca-the-drals (Pyramid 1976)
- The Tea Dance (Pyramid 1977)
- Confessions (Casablanca 1978)
- Forces of the Night (Casablanca 1979)
- Star, Baby (Casablanca 1980)
- Wicked Youth: Selected Performances 1976-1984 (Pyramid 2006)
