= Pierre Papadiamandis =

French songwriter and pianist (1937–2022)

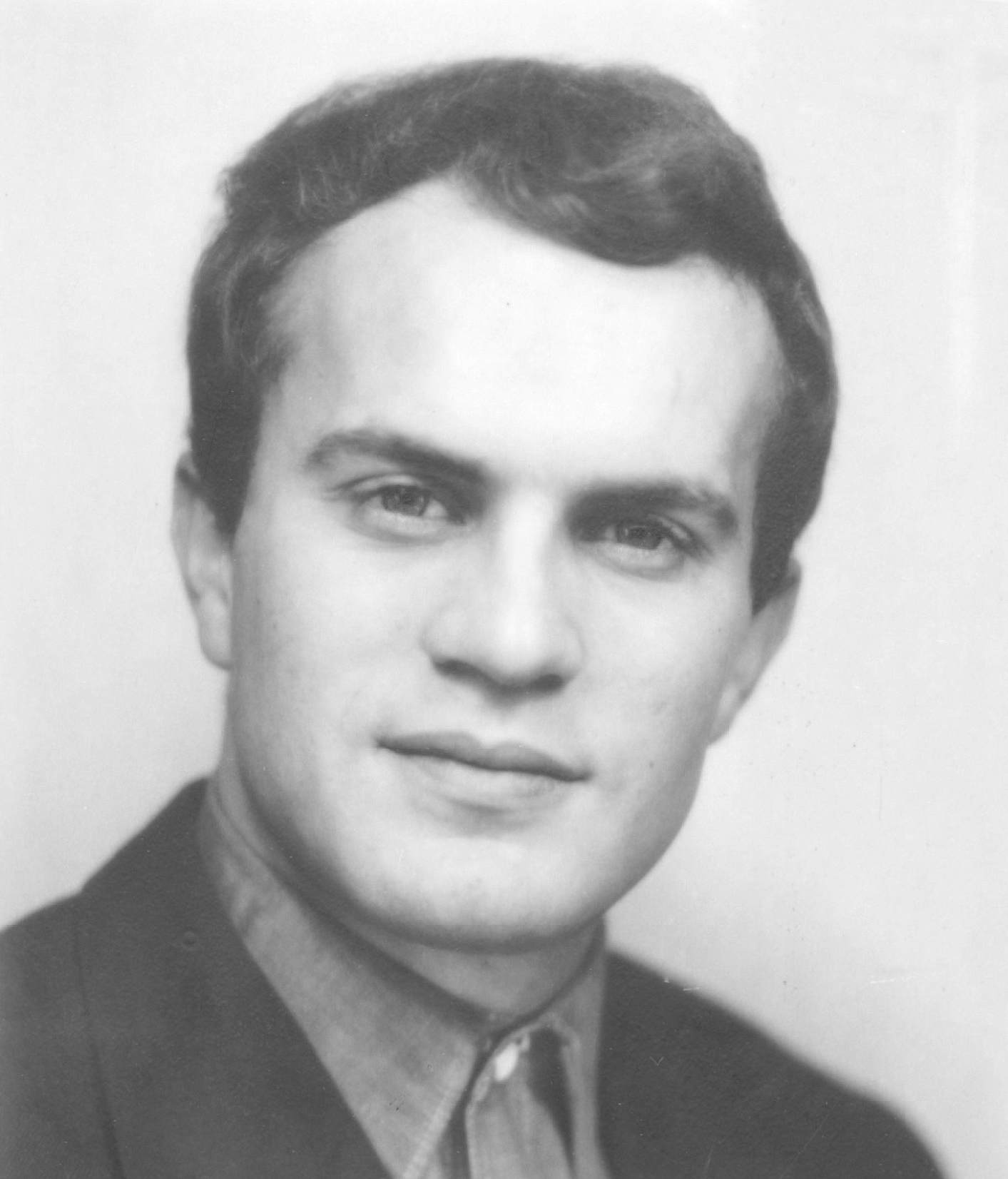
- Born: 31 January 1937; Nogent-sur-Marne, France
- Died: 22 March 2022 (aged 85); Paris, France
- Occupations: Songwriter, pianist

Pierre Papadiamandis (31 January 1937 – 22 March 2022) was a French songwriter and pianist of Greek origin.

== Life and career ==
Born in Nogent-sur-Marne, Papadiamandis grew up in Nogent-sur-Marne, and started playing piano at 5 years old. In 1964 he began his long association with Eddy Mitchell, first as pianist in his supporting band, and starting from "J'ai oublié de l'oublier" (1966) as the main composer of his songs. He collaborated with Mitchell for over fifty years, and composed over 200 songs of his repertoire. Other notable collaborations include Ray Charles, Celine Dion, Grace Jones, Michel Delpech, Johnny Hallyday and Françoise Hardy.

Papadiamandis died on 22 March 2022, at the age of 85 years old.
