= Gloria Gaynor discography =

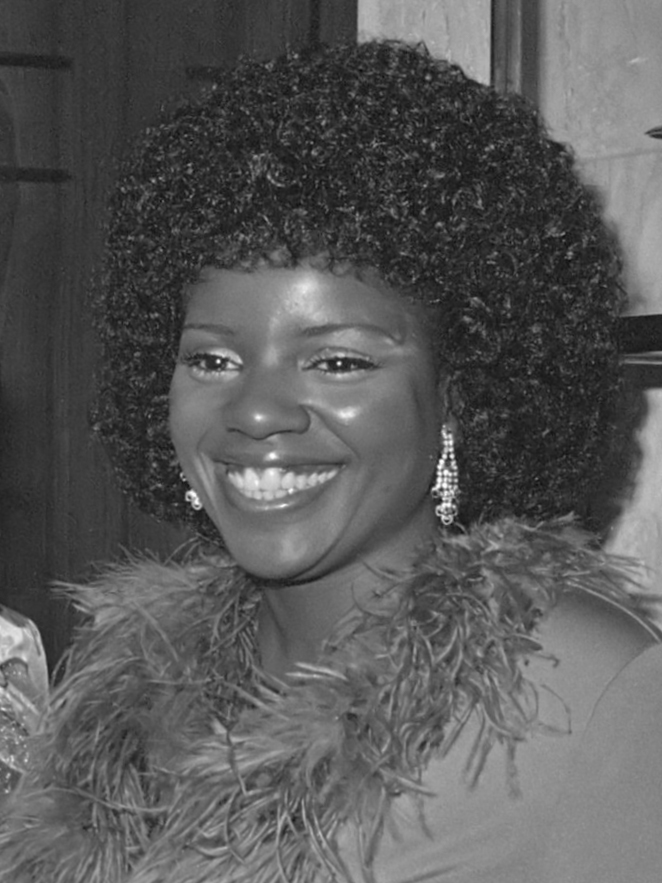
Gloria Gaynor in 1976

This discography documents albums and singles released by American R&B/disco/pop music singer Gloria Gaynor:

Gaynor has released twenty studio albums, one extended play, two live albums, ten compilation albums, and 53 singles.

== Albums ==
=== Studio albums ===
| Year | Title | Peak chart positions | | | | | | | | | Certifications | Record label |
| Year | Title | US | US R&B | AUS | CAN | FRA | GER | NLD | SWE | UK | Certifications | Record label |
|---|---|---|---|---|---|---|---|---|---|---|---|---|
| 1975 | Never Can Say Goodbye | 25 | 21 | 8 | 28 | 12 | 2 | 6 | 37 | 32 | AUS: Gold; BPI: Silver; MC: Gold | MGM |
| 1975 | Experience Gloria Gaynor | 64 | 32 | 23 | 33 | — | — | — | 28 | — | | MGM |
| 1976 | I've Got You | 107 | 40 | — | 83 | — | — | — | 14 | — | | Polydor |
| 1977 | Glorious | 183 | — | — | — | — | — | — | — | — | | Polydor |
| 1978 | Gloria Gaynor's Park Avenue Sound | — | — | — | — | — | — | — | — | — | | Polydor |
| 1978 | Love Tracks | 4 | 4 | 15 | 4 | 1 | 34 | 34 | 10 | 31 | RIAA: Platinum; MC: Gold | Polydor |
| 1979 | I Have a Right | 58 | 56 | — | — | — | — | — | 34 | — | | Polydor |
| 1980 | Stories | 178 | — | — | — | — | — | — | — | — | | Polydor |
| 1981 | I Kinda Like Me | — (Note: I Kinda Like Me did not enter the Billboard 200, but peaked at number 206 on the Bubbling Under the Top LP's chart.) | — | — | — | — | — | — | — | — | | Polydor |
| 1982 | Gloria Gaynor | — (Note: Gloria Gaynor did not enter the Billboard 200, but peaked at number 210 on the Bubbling Under the Top LP's chart.) | — | — | — | — | — | — | — | — | | Atlantic |
| 1984 | I Am Gloria Gaynor | — | — | — | — | — | — | — | — | — | | Silver Blue |
| 1986 | The Power of Gloria Gaynor | — | — | — | — | — | — | — | — | 81 | | Stylus |
| 1990 | Gloria Gaynor '90 | — | — | — | — | — | — | — | — | — | | New Music |
| 1992 | Love Affair | — | — | — | — | — | — | — | — | — | | New Music |
| 1994 | I'll Be There | — | — | — | — | — | — | — | — | — | | Radikal |
| 1997 | The Answer | — | — | — | — | — | — | — | — | — | | Florical Music |
| 2002 | I Wish You Love | — | — | — | — | — | — | — | — | — | | Logical |
| 2007 | Christmas Presence | — | — | — | — | — | — | — | — | — | | Glolo |
| 2013 | We Will Survive | — | — | — | — | — | — | — | — | — | | Glolo |
| 2019 | Testimony | — | — | — | — | — | — | — | — | — | | Gaither Music Group |
"—" denotes a recording that did not chart or was not released in that territory.

=== Extended Plays ===
| Year | Title | Record label |
|---|---|---|
| 2025 | Happy Tears | Glolo |

=== Live albums ===
- Live! at John J. Burns Town Park (2005, Instant Live)
- Ao Vivo: Festival De Verao Salvador (2008, Som Livre)

=== Compilation albums ===
- The Best of Gloria Gaynor (1977, Polydor)
- The Best of Gloria Gaynor (1980, Polydor)
- Greatest Hits (1982, Polydor)
- Greatest Hits (1988, Polydor)
- The Very Best of Gloria Gaynor: I Will Survive (1993, Polydor)
- The Collection (1996, Spectrum Music)
- The Best of Gloria Gaynor (1997, PolyGram)
- I Will Survive: The Anthology (1998, Polydor)
- Classic Gloria Gaynor: The Universal Masters Collection (1999, Polydor)
- 20th Century Masters – The Millennium Collection: The Best of Gloria Gaynor (2000, Polydor)

== Singles ==
| Year | Title | Peak chart positions | | | | | | | | | | | Certifications | Album |
| Year | Title | US | US R&B | US Dan | AUS | CAN | FRA | GER | IRE | NLD | SWE | UK | Certifications | Album |
|---|---|---|---|---|---|---|---|---|---|---|---|---|---|---|
| 1965 | "She'll Be Sorry" | — | — | — | — | — | — | — | — | — | — | — | | —N/a |
| 1974 | "Honey Bee" | — (Note: "Honey Bee" did not enter the Hot 100, but peaked at number 103 on Bubbling Under Hot 100 Singles.) | 55 | 2 | — | — | — | — | — | 27 | — | — | | Never Can Say Goodbye |
| 1974 | "Never Can Say Goodbye" | 9 | 34 | 1 (Note: "Never Can Say Goodbye" also charted at No. 2 on the Disco Action chart with the songs "Honey Bee" and "Reach Out, I'll Be There".) | 3 | 3 | 35 | 13 | 3 | 6 | — | 2 | BPI: Silver | Never Can Say Goodbye |
| 1975 | "Reach Out, I'll Be There" | 60 | 56 | 2 | 35 | 16 | 17 | 5 | — | 3 | — | 14 | | Never Can Say Goodbye |
| 1975 | "Walk On By" | 98 | — | — | — | 86 | — | 17 | — | 19 | — | — | | Experience Gloria Gaynor |
| 1975 | "All I Need Is Your Sweet Lovin'" | — | — | — | — | — | — | — | — | — | — | 44 | | Never Can Say Goodbye |
| 1975 | "Casanova Brown" | — | — | 1 | — | — | — | — | — | — | — | — | | Experience Gloria Gaynor* (These 3 singles were released as a 7 1/2 minute Radio edit which peaked #1 US Dance Oct 18, 1975) |
| 1975 | "(If You Want It) Do It Yourself" | 98 | 24 | 1 | — | — | 31 | — | — | — | — | — | | Experience Gloria Gaynor* (These 3 singles were released as a 7 1/2 minute Radio edit which peaked #1 US Dance Oct 18, 1975) |
| 1975 | "How High the Moon" | 75 | 73 | 1 | — | 95 | 29 | 42 | — | 22 | 18 | 33 | | Experience Gloria Gaynor* (These 3 singles were released as a 7 1/2 minute Radio edit which peaked #1 US Dance Oct 18, 1975) |
| 1976 | "Touch of Lightning" | — | — | — | — | — | — | — | — | — | — | — | | I've Got You |
| 1976 | "Let's Make a Deal" | — | 95 | 4 | — | — | — | — | — | — | — | — | | I've Got You |
| 1976 | "I've Got You Under My Skin" | — | — | 4 | — | — | — | — | — | — | — | — | | I've Got You |
| 1976 | "Be Mine" | — | — | 4 | — | — | — | — | — | — | — | — | | I've Got You |
| 1977 | "We Can Start All Over Again" | — | — | 38 | — | — | — | — | — | — | — | — | | Glorious |
| 1977 | "Life Ain't Worth Living" | — | — | 38 | — | — | — | — | — | — | — | — | | Glorious |
| 1977 | "Why Should I Pay" | — | — | 38 | — | — | — | — | — | — | — | — | | Glorious |
| 1977 | "Most of All" | — | — | — | — | — | — | — | — | — | — | — | | Glorious |
| 1978 | "You're All I Need to Get By" | — | — | 24 | — | — | — | — | — | — | — | — | | Gloria Gaynor's Park Avenue Sound |
| 1978 | "Kidnapped" | — | — | 24 | — | — | — | — | — | — | — | — | | Gloria Gaynor's Park Avenue Sound |
| 1978 | "This Love Affair" | — | — | — | — | — | — | — | — | — | — | — | | Gloria Gaynor's Park Avenue Sound |
| 1978 | "Substitute" | — (Note: "Substitute" did not enter the Hot 100, but peaked at number 107 on Bubbling Under Hot 100 Singles.) | 78 | 1 | — | — | — | — | — | — | — | — | | Love Tracks |
| 1978 | "I Will Survive" | 1 | 4 | 1 | 5 | 3 | 7 | 2 | 1 | 5 | 3 | 1 | RIAA: Platinum; BPI: Platinum; MC: Platinum; RMNZ: 2× Platinum | Love Tracks |
| 1979 | "Anybody Wanna Party?" | — (Note: "Anybody Wanna Party?" did not enter the Hot 100, but peaked at number 105 on Bubbling Under Hot 100 Singles.) | 16 | 1 | — | 78 | — | — | — | — | — | — | | Love Tracks |
| 1979 | "I Said Yes" | — | — | 1 | — | — | — | — | — | — | — | — | | Love Tracks |
| 1979 | "Love Is Just a Heartbeat Away (Nocturna's Theme)" | — | — | 81 | — | — | — | — | — | — | — | — | | Nocturna |
| 1979 | "Let Me Know (I Have a Right)" | 42 | 61 | 19 | — | 95 | 60 | — | — | 36 | — | 32 | | I Have a Right |
| 1980 | "Midnight Rocker" | — | — | — | — | — | — | — | — | — | — | — | | I Have a Right |
| 1980 | "Tonight" | — | — | — | — | — | — | — | — | — | — | — | | I Have a Right |
| 1981 | "Ain't No Bigger Fool" | — | — | — | — | — | — | — | — | — | — | — | | Stories |
| 1981 | "Let's Mend What's Been Broken" | — | 76 | — | — | — | — | — | — | — | — | — | | I Kinda Like Me |
| 1982 | "I Kinda Like Me" | — | — | — | — | — | — | — | — | — | — | — | | I Kinda Like Me |
| 1982 | "Tease Me" | — | — | — | — | — | — | — | — | — | — | — | | Gloria Gaynor |
| 1983 | "Stop in the Name of Love" | — | — | — | — | — | — | — | — | 50 | — | — | | Gloria Gaynor |
| 1983 | "America" | — | — | — | — | — | — | — | — | — | — | — | | Gloria Gaynor |
| 1983 | "I Am What I Am" | — (Note: "I Am What I Am" did not enter the Hot 100, but peaked at number 102 on Bubbling Under Hot 100 Singles.) | 82 | 3 | 69 | — | 35 | 32 | 18 | 37 | — | 13 | | I Am Gloria Gaynor |
| 1984 | "Strive" | — | — | — | — | — | — | — | — | — | — | 86 | | I Am Gloria Gaynor |
| 1985 | "My Love Is Music" | — | — | — | — | — | — | — | — | — | — | — | | —N/a |
| 1986 | "Don't You Dare Call It Love" | — | — | — | — | — | — | — | — | — | — | — | | The Power of Gloria Gaynor |
| 1987 | "Be Soft with Me Tonight" | — | — | — | — | — | — | — | — | — | — | 80 | | —N/a |
| 1990 | "I Will Survive" (The Shep Pettibone Club Remixes) | — | — | — | — | — | — | 42 | — | — | — | — | | —N/a |
| 1990 | "Can't Take My Eyes Off You" | — | — | — | — | — | — | — | — | — | — | — | | Gloria Gaynor '90 |
| 1991 | "Megamedley" | — | — | — | — | — | — | 94 | — | — | — | — | | —N/a |
| 1992 | "First Be a Woman" | — | — | — | — | — | 67 | — | — | — | — | — | | Love Affair |
| 1993 | "I Will Survive" (Phil Kelsey Remix) | — | — | — | — | — | — | — | 6 | — | — | 5 | | —N/a |
| 1997 | "Mighty High" (with The Trammps) | — | — | 12 | — | — | — | — | — | — | — | — | | —N/a |
| 1997 | "Oh, What a Life" | — | — | — | — | — | — | — | — | — | — | — | | The Answer |
| 2000 | "Never Can Say Goodbye" (Remix) | — | — | — | — | — | — | — | — | — | — | — | | —N/a |
| 2000 | "Last Night" (with the Giorgio Moroder Project) | — | — | — | — | — | — | 70 | — | — | — | 67 | | —N/a |
| 2001 | "Just Keep Thinking About You" | — | — | 1 | — | — | — | — | — | — | — | 85 | | I Wish You Love |
| 2002 | "I Never Knew" | — | — | 1 | — | — | — | — | — | — | — | — | | I Wish You Love |
| 2022 | "Can’t Stop Writing Songs About You" (with Kylie Minogue) | — | — | — | — | — | — | — | — | — | — | — | | Disco: Guest List Edition |
| 2025 | "Fida Known" | — | — | — | — | — | — | — | — | — | — | — | | Happy Tears |
| 2025 | "When I See You" | — | — | — | — | — | — | — | — | — | — | | | Happy Tears |
"—" denotes a recording that did not chart or was not released in that territory.

== Music videos ==
| Year | Title | Album |
|---|---|---|
| 1975 | "Reach Out, I'll Be There" | Never Can Say Goodbye |
| 1975 | "Walk On By" | Experience Gloria Gaynor |
| 1978 | "I Will Survive" | Love Tracks |
| 1979 | "Let Me Know (I Have a Right)" | I Have a Right |
| 2000 | "Last Night" (Dave Sears Mix; with the Giorgio Moroder Project) | —N/a |
| 2001 | "Just Keep Thinking About You" | I Wish You Love |
| 2002 | "I Never Knew" | I Wish You Love |
| 2019 | "Back on Top" | Testimony |
| 2022 | "Can't Stop Writing Songs About You" (with Kylie Minogue) | Disco: Guest List Edition |
| 2023 | "I Will Survive" (re-recording) | —N/a |
| 2025 | "Fida Known" | Happy Tears |
