= I Will Survive (disambiguation) =

"I Will Survive" is a song first performed by Gloria Gaynor.

I Will Survive may also refer to:

- I Will Survive (TV series), a 2012 Australian talent show
- I Will Survive (book), a 2009 memoir by Sunil Robert
- I Will Survive (1999 film), a Spanish film
- I Will Survive (1993 film), a South Korean historical drama film
- I Will Survive (Billie Jo Spears album), a 1979 album by Billie Jo Spears
- I Will Survive (Gloria Gaynor album)
- I Will Survive (comic), a 2017 fan art comic based on Zootopia
- "I Will Survive", a 1970 song by Liverpool band Arrival
- "I Will Survive", a song by Cheap Trick from the soundtrack to the 1992 film Gladiator

== See also ==
- I Will Survive (Doin' It My Way), an album by Chantay Savage
