= Experience Gloria Gaynor =

Studio album by Gloria Gaynor
- Released: September 5, 1975
- Recorded: 1975
- Genres: Disco; R&B
- Label: MGM
- Producers: Meco Monardo, Tony Bongiovi, Jay Ellis

Gloria Gaynor chronology
Never Can Say Goodbye (1975)	Experience Gloria Gaynor (1975)	I've Got You (1976)

Professional ratings
Review scores
Source	Rating
AllMusic	3/5 stars
The Encyclopedia of Popular Music	3/5 stars
The Rolling Stone Album Guide	2/5 stars

Experience Gloria Gaynor is the second album by Gloria Gaynor, released in 1975 on MGM Records. The album charted in the US Billboard at #64 on the US Pop chart, and at #32 on the US R&B chart. Although, the album failed to chart in the UK, the single "How High The Moon" was issued there and peaked at #33.

== History ==
Side one of the album is dance-oriented, while side two is R&B/soul music oriented. Includes the hit singles; "Casanova Brown", "(If You Want It) Do It Yourself" and "How High the Moon" presented in a 19-minute suite by Tom Moulton. The soul music songs on side two of the album included a rendition of "What'll I Do", a well-received rendition of the Dionne Warwick hit "Walk On By," and an example of Gloria Gaynor's own songwriting called "I'm Still Yours".

The album was remastered and reissued with bonus tracks in 2010 by Big Break Records.

== Track listing ==
No.	Title	Writer(s)	Length
1.	"Casanova Brown"	Jimmy Roach	6:23
2.	"(If You Want It) Do It Yourself"	James Bolden, Jack Robinson	5:58
3.	"How High the Moon"	Morgan Lewis, Nancy Hamilton	6:35
4.	"The Prettiest Face I've Ever Seen"	Marie Cain	3:00
5.	"What'll I Do"	Burton Senior, Chris Essel	4:33
6.	"Tell Me How"	Lester Hodelin	3:11
7.	"I'm Still Yours"	Gloria Gaynor	3:28
8.	"Walk On By"	Burt Bacharach, Hal David	5:42

2010 remastered reissue bonus tracks
No.	Title	Length
9.	"Casanova Brown" (Promotional Single Version)	3:14
10.	"(If You Want It) Do It Yourself" (Single Version)	2:50
11.	"How High the Moon" (Single Version)	2:51
12.	"Walk On By" (Single Version)	3:03
13.	"My Man's Gone" (B-Side)	2:23

== Charts ==
Chart (1975/76)	Peak position
Australian (Kent Music Report)	23

== Personnel ==
- Gloria Gaynor – vocals
- Allan Schwartzberg – drums
- Bob Babbitt – bass guitar
- Pat Rebillot – keyboards
- Carlos Martin – congas
- Jeff Miranov, Jerry Freidman, Lance Quinn – guitar
- Jimmy Maelen – percussion
- Alan Rubin, Pat Russo – trumpet
- Wayne Andre, Dave Taylor – trombone
- George Taylor, Lou Del Gatto – reeds
- The Tony Posk Strings – strings
- Linda November, Arlene Martell, Vivian Cherry – background vocals

=== Production ===
- Meco Monardo – producer, arranger, vocal arrangements
- Tony Bongiovi – producer, recording engineer
- Jay Ellis – producer
- Harold Wheeler – arranger
- Andrew Smith – arranger
- Tom Moulton – mixing
- Michael DeLugg – recording engineer
- Bob Halsall – recording engineer
- Kim Stallings – recording engineer
- Norman Seeff – photography
- Peter Corriston – design
- Bill Levy – art direction
