= What a Life =

What a Life may refer to:

== Books ==
- What a Life! (novel), a 1911 novel by E. V. Lucas and George Morrow

== Film and entertainment ==
- What a Life (1932 film), a 1932 Flip the Frog cartoon
- What a Life (play), a 1938 play by Clifford Goldsmith that originally starred Ezra Stone
  - What a Life (film), a 1939 film based on Goldsmith's play, co-written by Billy Wilder

== Music ==
=== Albums ===
- What a Life! (album), a 1985 album by Divinyls
- What a Life, 2013 album by Erin Boheme
- What a Life (Gloria Gaynor album), European release of album The Answer, 1997
- What a Life (Adam Brand album), a 2006 album by Adam Brand
- What a Life (EP), a 2019 EP by Exo-SC

=== Songs ===
- "What a Life" (Juliana Hatfield song), 1995
- "What a Life" (Exo-SC song), 2019
- "What a Life", by Scarlet Pleasure from the film Another Round, 2020
- "Zindagi Kya Baat Hai" (transl. What a Life), by Sukhwinder Singh from the Indian film Astitva, 2000

== See also ==
- Oh, What a Life (disambiguation)
- "AKA... What a Life!", a 2011 song by Noel Gallagher's High Flying Birds
