= Oh, What a Life =

Oh, What a Life may refer to:

- "Oy, Is Dus a Leben!" (Oh, What a Life!), a 1942 work by Joseph Rumshinsky
- Oh, What a Life (album), a 2014 album by American Authors
- "Oh, What a Life", a 1997 song by Gloria Gaynor, from the album The Answer
- "Ooh, What a Life" (song), a 1979 song by Gibson Brothers

== See also ==
- What a Life (disambiguation)
