= Love Tracks (Gloria Gaynor album) =

Studio album by Gloria Gaynor
- Released: November 27, 1978
- Recorded: 1978
- Genre: Disco
- Length: 42:15
- Label: Polydor
- Producer: Dino Fekaris

Gloria Gaynor chronology
Gloria Gaynor's Park Avenue Sound (1978)	Love Tracks (1978)	I Have a Right (1979)

Singles from Love Tracks
- 1. "Substitute" Released: 1978; 2. "I Will Survive" Released: October 23, 1978; 3. "Anybody Wanna Party?" Released: 1979

Love Tracks is the sixth studio album by Gloria Gaynor, released in November 1978 on Polydor Records. It reached number four on the US Billboard 200 and includes Gaynor's biggest hit single "I Will Survive".

== History ==
Love Tracks includes her million-selling number-one single "I Will Survive", which originally started out as the B-side to the album's first single, a cover of Clout's "Substitute" before it was flipped. (The 12" single was quickly deleted and the 4:56 album version was replaced with the 8:01 12" version in order to sell more albums).

The song "Anybody Wanna Party?" also became a hit, becoming a top-20 hit on the club/dance chart, as well as peaking at number 16 on the R&B chart.

The album was remastered and reissued with bonus tracks in 2013 by Big Break Records.

== Critical reception ==
Professional ratings
Review scores
Source	Rating
AllMusic	4.5/5 stars
Christgau's Record Guide	B+
The Rolling Stone Album Guide	3.5/5 stars
Smash Hits	4/10
The Virgin Encyclopedia of R&B and Soul	3/5 stars

The Bay State Banner wrote that "'I Will Survive' is arresting black pop, sung with directness and conviction that reflects personal triumph... Gaynor has never sounded this confident or inspired."

== Track listing ==
All tracks are written by Dino Fekaris and Freddie Perren, except where noted.

Love Tracks track listing
No.	Title	Writer(s)	Length
1.	"Stoplight"		3:38
2.	"Anybody Wanna Party?"		5:14
3.	"Please, Be There"	Dino Fekaris, David Van De Pitte	4:30
4.	"Goin' Out of My Head"	Teddy Randazzo, Bobby Weinstein	5:33
5.	"I Will Survive"		4:56
6.	"You Can Exit"		5:16
7.	"I Said Yes"		3:59
8.	"Substitute"	Willie H. Wilson	3:15

2013 remastered reissue bonus tracks
No.	Title	Length
9.	"I Will Survive" (12" disco version)	8:02
10.	"Anybody Wanna Party?" (12" disco version)	7:41
11.	"Substitute" (12" disco version)	8:29
12.	"Yo Viviré" ("I Will Survive" – Spanish 12" disco version)	7:53
13.	"I Will Survive" (A Tom Moulton Mix)	10:32

== Personnel ==
Musicians

- Gloria Gaynor – vocals
- James Gadson – drums
- Bob "Boogie" Bowles, Wah Wah Watson, Robert White – guitar
- Peter Robinson, Freddie Perren – keyboards
- Eddie Watkins, Scott Edwards – bass guitar
- Paulinho da Costa, Bob Zimmitti – percussion
- Peter Robinson – synthesizer
- Gene Page – conductor, strings and horns ("Spotlight", "I Said Yes" and "Goin' Out of My Head")
- Peter Robinson – conductor, strings and horns ("Anybody Wanna Party" and "Please Be There")
- Don Peake – conductor, strings and horns ("You Can Exit")
- Dave Blumberg – conductor, strings and horns ("I Will Survive" and "Substitute")
- Julia Tillman Waters, Maxine Willard Waters, Stephanie Spruill – backing vocals

Production

- Dino Fekaris, Freddie Perren – producers
- Freddie Perren – rhythm arrangements
- Benjamin Barrett – contractor
- Lewis Peters, Jack Rouben – recording and remix engineers
- Rick Clifford – assistant engineer
- Ed Biggs – mastering
- Bob Heimall – design

== Charts ==
=== Weekly charts ===
Weekly chart performance for Love Tracks
Chart (1979)	Peak position
Australian Albums (Kent Music Report)	15
Canada Top Albums/CDs (RPM)	4
Dutch Albums (Album Top 100)	34
Swedish Albums (Sverigetopplistan)	10
Norwegian Albums (VG-lista)	14
German Albums (Offizielle Top 100)	34
UK Albums (Official Charts)	31
US Billboard 200	4
US Top 75 Soul Albums (Billboard)	4

=== Year-end charts ===
Year-end chart performance for Love Tracks
Chart (1979)	Position
Canada Top Albums/CDs (RPM)	23
US Billboard 200	40

== Certifications ==
Certifications for Love Tracks
Region	Certification	Certified units/sales
Canada (Music Canada)	Gold	50,000^{^}
United States (RIAA)	Platinum	1,000,000^{^}
^{^} Shipments figures based on certification alone.
