= I've Got You (album) =

Studio album by Gloria Gaynor
- Released: July 20, 1976
- Genre: Disco; soul
- Label: Polydor
- Producer: Meco Monardo, Tony Bongiovi, Jay Ellis

Gloria Gaynor chronology
Experience Gloria Gaynor (1975)	I've Got You (1976)	Glorious (1977)

Professional ratings
Review scores
Source	Rating
AllMusic	2/5 stars
The Encyclopedia of Popular Music	2/5 stars

I've Got You is the third album by vocalist Gloria Gaynor released in 1976. It was her first on Polydor Records, which had absorbed her previous label MGM Records and soon became a force in the disco genre. The album charted in the US Billboard at #107 in the US Pop chart and at #40 in the US R&B chart.

== History ==
I've Got You features the megamix by Tom Moulton, a 17-minute disco suite with the songs "Let's Make a Deal", "I've Got You Under My Skin" and "Be Mine." The songs from the Soul based side two of the album includes "Touch of Lightning", "Let's Make Love", "Nothing in This World" and "Do It Right."

The album was remastered and reissued with bonus tracks in 2015 by Big Break Records.

== Track listing ==
No.	Title	Writer(s)	Length
1.	"Let's Make a Deal"	Curtis Blandon	4:20
2.	"I've Got You Under My Skin"	Cole Porter	7:49
3.	"Be Mine"	Don Oriolo	4:56
4.	"Touch of Lightning"	Joey Levine	3:42
5.	"Let's Make Love"	Curtis Blandon	3:49
6.	"Nothing in This World"	Thomas Major	3:23
7.	"Do It Right"	Curtis Blandon	3:06
8.	"Talk, Talk, Talk"	Don Oriolo	5:44

2015 remastered reissue bonus tracks
No.	Title	Length
9.	"Let's Make a Deal" (Single Version)	2:51
10.	"I've Got You Under My Skin" (Single Version)	3:45

== Personnel ==
- Gloria Gaynor – vocals
- Allan Schwartzberg, Jimmy Young – drums
- Bob Babbitt – bass guitar
- Lance Quinn, Jerry Freidman, Jeff Mironov – guitar
- Pat Rebillot – keyboards
- Carlos Martin – congas
- Bongi – dishpan drums
- Alan Rubin, Pat Russo – trumpet
- Dave Taylor, Wayne Andre, Barry Rodgers – trombone
- Lou DelGatto, George Taylor, Larry Combs – reeds
- Peter Gordon, Jimmy Buffington – French horns
- The Tony Posk Strings – strings
- Linda November, Arlene Martell, Vivian Cherry – background vocals (Simon Said on "I've Got You Under My Skin")

== Production ==
- Meco Monardo, Tony Bongiovi, Jay Ellis – producers
- Tom Moulton – mixing
- Mecco Menardo, Lance Quinn, Charlie Callelo, Harold Wheeler, Brad Baker, Lou DelGatto – arrangers
- Mecco Menardo – vocal arrangements
- Tony Bongiovi, Bob Halsall, Bob Valicenti – engineers
- José Rodriguez – mastering
- Joe Williams – cover photography
