= All I Need Is Your Sweet Lovin' =

Single by Gloria Gaynor

from the album Never Can Say Goodbye
- B-side: "Real Good People"
- Released: August 1975 (UK)
- Recorded: 1975
- Genre: Soul, disco
- Length: 2:48
- Label: MGM
- Songwriters: Bobby Flax; Larry Lambert
- Producers: Jay Ellis; Meco Monardo; Tony Bongiovi

Gloria Gaynor singles chronology
| "Walk on By" (1975) | "All I Need Is Your Sweet Lovin'" (1975) | "Casanova Brown" (1975) |

"All I Need Is Your Sweet Lovin'" (also known under the title "All I Need Is Your Good Lovin'") is a song by American singer Gloria Gaynor, released in August 1975. It was written by Bobby Flax and Larry Lambert, and the single charted at number forty-four on the UK Singles Chart.

== Credits and personnel ==
- Gloria Gaynor – lead vocal
- Bobby Flax – writer
- Larry Lambert – writer
- Jay Ellis – producer
- Meco Monardo – producer
- Tony Bongiovi – producer
- Lou Del Gato – arranger
- Chappel & Co. Ltd – publisher

== Charts ==
| Chart (1975) | Peak position |
|---|---|
| UK Singles Chart | 44 |

== Marika Gombitová version ==
"Včielka"

Song by Marika Gombitová

from the album Diskotéka OPUSu 5
- Language: Slovak
- Released: 1980
- Genre: Pop
- Length: 2:39
- Label: OPUS
- Composers: Bobby Flax; Larry Lambert
- Lyricist: Peter Guldan (this version)

Audio sample
- file; help

"Včielka" (Bow and Shaft) is a cover version of the Gloria Gaynor song, recorded by Slovak female singer Marika Gombitová. Her version, with featuring alternate lyrics, was released on Diskotéka OPUSu 5 compilation by OPUS in 1980.

=== Credits and personnel ===
- Marika Gombitová – lead vocal
- Bobby Flax – writer
- Larry Lambert – writer
- Peter Guldan – lyrics
- V.V. Systém – orchestra
