= Allan Schwartzberg =

American musician (born 1942)

- Born: December 28, 1942 (age 83); New York City, New York, U.S.
- Genres: Rock; jazz; disco; space disco; film score; R&B; post-punk; new wave; heavy metal; synth-pop
- Occupations: Musician; record producer
- Instruments: Drums; percussion
- Years active: 1969–present

Allan Schwartzberg (born December 28, 1942) is an American musician and record producer. He has been a member of the rock band Mountain, Peter Gabriel's first solo band, toured with Brecker Brothers' Dreams, B. J. Thomas, Linda Ronstadt, Stan Getz band, and the Pat Travers band. He has experienced success as a prolific session musician, through recordings made from the 1970s through today. He has also played on multi genre hits such as Gloria Gaynor "Never Can Say Goodbye", considered the first disco record, James Brown's "Funky President", Harry Chapin's "Cat's in the Cradle", Tony Orlando & Dawn's Tie A Yellow Ribbon, Peter Gabriel's "Solsbury Hill", The Spinners' "Workin' My Way Back to You", the Star Wars theme, and Rod Stewart's Great American Songbook series including the hit "What A Wonderful World". He has played with musicians and singers including John Lennon, Diana Ross, Jimi Hendrix, Alice Cooper, Kiss, Frank Sinatra, Roxy Music, Robert Palmer, Grace Slick, Roberta Flack, Barry Manilow, Harry Chapin, Barbra Streisand, Deodato, Frankie Valli, and Roger Daltrey. He was also a frequent musician guest with Paul Shaffer's David Letterman Show band.

== Early life and education ==
Allan Schwartzberg was born on December 28, 1942, in New York City, New York. He is Jewish and attended yeshiva as a child. He began playing the drums at the age of ten and attended the Manhattan School of Music for three years, studying classical percussion. He claims that his real education was listening to and memorizing the work of musicians like Max Roach, Elvin Jones and Philly Joe Jones.

At the age of 20, he was the house drummer at the famed Half Note Club in downtown New York, performing with a variety of jazz musicians, including Stan Getz, Al Cohn, Zoot Sims, Roy Eldridge, Bob Brookmeyer, Richie Kamuca, Jim Hall, Ron Carter, Anita O'Day, Chris Conner, and Jimmy Rushing.

He was also the leader of the band on the nationally syndicated Geraldo Rivera Show, Goodnight America, which was considered the first rock / R&B "hip" band for a talk show.

== Personal life ==
On November 12, 1972, Schwartzberg married Susan Schlossberg. They have two daughters, Samona and Nicole; and three grandchildren, Deven, Talia, and Quinton Cole.

== Equipment ==
Schwartzberg endorses Yamaha drums, Zildjian cymbals, Remo drumheads, and Vic Firth drumsticks.

== Discography ==
=== 1970s ===
Year	Title	Artist
1971	Lay It All Out	Barry Mann
1973	Tie a Yellow Ribbon	Dawn
1973	True Stories and Other Dreams	Judy Collins
1973	Home to Myself	Melissa Manchester
1973	Dawn's New Ragtime Follies	Tony Orlando & Dawn
1974	Reality	James Brown
1974	Twin Peaks	Mountain
1974	Verities & Balderdash	Harry Chapin
1974	Barry Manilow II	Barry Manilow
1974	Veedon Fleece	Van Morrison
1974	Ladies Love Outlaws	Tom Rush
1975	Crash Landing	Jimi Hendrix
1975	Midnight Lightning	Jimi Hendrix
1975	Waterbed	Herbie Mann
1975	Never Can Say Goodbye	Gloria Gaynor
1975	Our Day Will Come	Frankie Valli
1975	Portrait Gallery	Harry Chapin
1976	Moon Over Brooklyn	The Group with No Name
1976	Alice Cooper Goes to Hell	Alice Cooper
1976	Smile	Laura Nyro
1976	I've Got You	Gloria Gaynor
1976	Circus Town	Tatsuro Yamashita
1976	Conquistador (Theme to Rocky)	Maynard Ferguson
1977	Peter Gabriel	Peter Gabriel
1977	Portfolio	Grace Jones
1977	Glorious	Gloria Gaynor
1977	Star Wars and Other Galactic Funk	Meco
1977	Lace and Whiskey	Alice Cooper
1977	Herbie Mann and Fire Island	Herbie Mann
1977	Conquistador	Maynard Ferguson
1977	A Song	Neil Sedaka
1977	Lady Put the Light Out	Frankie Valli
1977	Blue Lights in the Basement	Roberta Flack
1977	Portfolio	Grace Jones
1978	Songbird	Barbra Streisand
1978	Gene Simmons	Gene Simmons
1978	Heavy Metal Be-Bop	The Brecker Brothers
1978	Think It Over	Cissy Houston
1978	Peter Criss	Peter Criss
1978	Double Fun	Robert Palmer
1979	Platinum	Mike Oldfield
1979	Two Sides to Every Woman	Carlene Carter
1979	Nils	Nils Lofgren
1979	Take a Bite	Marlena Shaw
1979	Live and Sleazy	Village People

=== 1980s ===
Year	Title	Artist
1980	Flesh + Blood	Roxy Music
1980	Step Aside for a Lady	Cissy Houston
1980	Dreams	Grace Slick
1980	Connections	Richie Havens
1981	Music from "The Elder"	Kiss
1981	Scissors Cut	Art Garfunkel
1982	NunSexMonkRock	Nina Hagen
1982	It's Alright (I See Rainbows)	Yoko Ono
1983	School for Spies	Kit Hain
1983	In My Life	Patti Austin
1984	Parting Should Be Painless	Roger Daltrey
1984	Milk and Honey	John Lennon and Yoko Ono
1984	Cover	Tom Verlaine
1985	"Tears Are Falling"	Kiss
1987	Flash Light	Tom Verlaine

=== 1990s ===
Year	Title	Artist
1990	What a Way to Go	Mark Murphy
1991	Union	Yes
1991	Help Yourself	Julian Lennon
1994	Roberta	Roberta Flack

=== 2000s ===
Year	Title	Artist
2003	As Time Goes By: The Great American Songbook, Volume II	Rod Stewart
2004	Stardust: The Great American Songbook, Volume III	Rod Stewart

== See also ==
- List of drummers

== Sources ==
- Jim Payne, Harry Weinger – The Great Drummers of R&B Funk & Soul
