= Testimony (Gloria Gaynor album) =

Studio album by Gloria Gaynor
- Released: June 7, 2019
- Recorded: 2019
- Genre: Gospel
- Length: 39:29
- Label: Gaither Music Group

Gloria Gaynor chronology
We Will Survive (2013)	Testimony (2019)

Testimony is the twentieth studio album by American singer Gloria Gaynor. The album was released on June 7, 2019, by Gaither Music Group. It won the Grammy Award for Best Roots Gospel Album at the 62nd Annual Grammy Awards. The song "Talkin' 'Bout Jesus" was also nominated for the Grammy Award for Best Gospel Performance/Song.

== Track listing ==
No.	Title	Length
1.	"Amazing Grace"	5:08
2.	"Back on Top"	3:35
3.	"He Won't Let Go" (featuring Bart Millard)	4:16
4.	"Joy Comes in the Morning"	2:59
5.	"Only You Can Do"	3:46
6.	"Singin' Over Me" (featuring Jason Crabb)	3:43
7.	"Talkin' 'Bout Jesus" (featuring Yolanda Adams)	3:14
8.	"Take My Hand, Precious Lord" (featuring Jason Crabb, Mike Farris and Bart Millard)	4:17
9.	"Man of Peace" (featuring Mike Farris)	4:30
10.	"Day One"	4:01
Total length:		39:29

== Charts ==
Chart (2019)	Peak position
US Top Gospel Albums (Billboard)	4
