= Stories (Gloria Gaynor album) =

Studio album by Gloria Gaynor
- Released: May 20, 1980
- Genre: Disco; R&B
- Label: Polydor
- Producer: Dino Fekaris, Freddie Perren

Gloria Gaynor chronology
I Have a Right (1979)	Stories (1980)	I Kinda Like Me (1981)

Professional ratings
Review scores
Source	Rating
AllMusic	3/5 stars
The Encyclopedia of Popular Music	2/5 stars

Stories is the eighth album by Gloria Gaynor, released in 1980. Failing to produce any hit singles, Stories didn't fare as well as its predecessors and peaked at No. 178 on the Billboard 200.

This album has yet to be reissued on CD.

== Critical reception ==
Billboard's reviewer noted with satisfaction that "Gaynor deserts the dictates of disco for an album of classic pop-soul songs". He singled out "Ain't No Bigger Fool" and "Make Me Yours" as fine examples of the Motown sound brought up-to-date, with powerful bass lines, beefy brass and call-and-response backup vocals". As well as a couple of ballads, "Don't Read Me Wrong" and "The Luckiest Girl In The World," that "underscore Gaynor's versatility". As a result critic called Stories a "singer's best LP in years".

== Track listing ==
All tracks are written by Dino Fekaris and Freddie Perren, except where noted.

Side one
No.	Title	Length
1.	"Ain't No Bigger Fool"	4:33
2.	"I Let Love Slip Right Through My Hands"	4:46
3.	"On a Diet of You"	4:42
4.	"Lock Me Up"	3:46

Side two
No.	Title	Writer(s)	Length
5.	"All My Life"	Christine Yarian, Samuel F. Brown III	4:25
6.	"Don't Read Me Wrong"	Gloria Gaynor, Eddie Sierra	3:47
7.	"The Luckiest Girl in the World"		5:10
8.	"Make Me Yours"		3:23

== Personnel ==
- Gloria Gaynor - vocals
- Nathan East - bass guitar
- Freddie Perren - keyboards
- Bob Bowles - guitar
- Bob Zimmitti - percussion
- Ernie Watts - saxophone, flute
- James Gadson - drums
- Paulinho da Costa - congas
- Nathan Watts - bass guitar
- David T. Walker - guitar
- Clarence McDonald - keyboards
- Alan Estes - percussion
- Gayle Levant - harp
- Bobbye Hall - congas
- Julia Waters - backing vocals
- Maxine Waters - backing vocals
- Stephanie Spruill - backing vocals
