= I Have a Right =

Studio album by Gloria Gaynor
- Released: September 24, 1979
- Genre: Disco
- Length: 47:27
- Label: Polydor
- Producer: Dino Fekaris, Freddie Perren

Gloria Gaynor chronology
Love Tracks (1978)	I Have a Right (1979)	Stories (1980)

Professional ratings
Review scores
Source	Rating
AllMusic	3/5 stars
The Encyclopedia of Popular Music	3/5 stars
Smash Hits	4/10

I Have a Right is Gloria Gaynor's seventh studio album, released in 1979. The track, "Let Me Know (I Have a Right)", was released as a single and reached No. 42 on the Billboard Hot 100. The album has never been released on CD.

== Reception ==
AllMusic called the opening track "Let Me Know" "a very weak and contrived start" and "a poor person's 'I Will Survive'." However, "the rest of the material is excellent. From both a disco standpoint and a Northern soul standpoint, I Have a Right is a welcome addition to Gaynor's catalog."

Smash Hits, however, said, "A desperately dull collection of over orchestrated nightclub songs, an out of date rhythm machine and a struggling soul singer bring you every disco cliche in the book without a shred of originality or personality to rescue it. Formula dance music for computers."

== Track listing ==
All tracks are written by Dino Fekaris and Freddie Perren, except where noted.

Side one
No.	Title	Writer(s)	Length
1.	"Let Me Know (I Have a Right)"		8:24
2.	"Say Somethin'"	Dino Fekaris, Gloria Gaynor, Freddie Perren	5:16
3.	"You Took Me In Again"		6:43
4.	"Don't Stop Us"		4:11

Side two
No.	Title	Writer(s)	Length
5.	"Tonight"	Leonard Bernstein, Stephen Sondheim	7:19
6.	"Can't Fight the Feelin'"	B.J. Verdi, Freddie Perren	4:30
7.	"Midnight Rocker"		6:09
8.	"One Number One"		4:40

== Personnel ==
- Gloria Gaynor - lead vocals
- Bob Bowles, Wah Wah Watson - guitar
- Pete Robinson - keyboards, synthesizer
- David Shields, Freddie Washington - bass guitar
- Freddie Perren - keyboards
- Bob Zimmitti - percussion
- Paulinho Da Costa - congas
- James Gadson - drums
- Doc Severinsen - trumpet
- Katie Kirkpatrick - harp
- Julia Waters, Maxine Waters, Marti McCall - backing vocals
