= Gloria Gaynor (album) =

Studio album by Gloria Gaynor
- Released: November 01, 1982
- Studio: Ameraycan Studios, North Hollywood; Atlantic Studios, New York City; Power Station, New York City; Kendun Recorders, Burbank, California
- Genre: Disco; R&B
- Label: Atlantic
- Producer: Yves Dessca, Rick Stevens, Amir Bayyan, Rick Stevens, Linwood Simon, Ollie E. Brown

Gloria Gaynor chronology
I Kinda Like Me (1981)	Gloria Gaynor (1982)	I Am Gloria Gaynor (1984)

Professional ratings
Review scores
Source	Rating
AllMusic	4/5 stars
The Encyclopedia of Popular Music	3/5 stars

Gloria Gaynor is the tenth studio album by Gloria Gaynor and her only to be released on Atlantic Records after her contract with Polydor Records expired. The lead single release was a cover of The Supremes' "Stop in the Name of Love", followed by the singles "America" and "Tease Me". The album failed to garner much attention in either the U.S. or in Europe. It was re-released on CD by Hot Productions in 1997 with two previously unreleased re-recordings of "I Will Survive", added as track 1 (3:35) and a 5:03 Extended Mix as track 10. The album was reissued on 2014 by BBR Records, and did not include the re-recorded versions of "I Will Survive", although the extended version can be found on countless compilations by Gaynor over the years. Instead were included the single versions of "Stop in the Name of Love", "America" and "Tease Me", as well as the 12" disco version of "Stop in the Name of Love".

== Track listings ==
1. "Stop in the Name of Love" (Holland-Dozier-Holland) - 4:12
2. "Runaround Love" (Fred Washington, Judy Wieder, Ollie E. Brown, Paul Jackson Jr.) - 4:18
3. "Mack-Side" (Carlos Alomar, Linwood M. Simon) - 4:12
4. "Tease Me" (James Washington, Thomas Woods) - 5:03
5. "America" (Linwood M. Simon, Norbert Sloley) - 5:28
6. "For You, My Love" (Linwood M. Simon, Norbert Sloley) - 4:14
7. "Love Me Real" (Kathy Wakefield, William Smith) - 5:13
8. "Even a Fool Would Let Go" (Kerry Chater, Tom Snow) - 3:27

2014 remastered reissue bonus tracks
No.	Title	Length
9.	"Stop in the Name of Love" (Single Version)	3:43
10.	"Tease Me" (Single Version)	3:59
11.	"America" (Single Version)	4:04
12.	"Stop in the Name of Love" (12" Disco Version)	4:46

== Personnel ==
- Gloria Gaynor - vocals
- James Jamerson - bass guitar
- Yogi Horton - drums
- Paul Jackson Jr. - guitar
- Dave Tofani - saxophone
- Wayne Brathwaite - bass guitar
- Ollie E. Brown - drums, percussion
- David Sanborn - saxophone
- Kashif - OBX synthesizer
- Carlos Franzetti - Fender Rhodes electric piano
- Norbert Sloley - bass guitar
- John Barnes - keyboards, synthesizer
- Joe Beck - acoustic guitar, electric guitar
- Paul Griffin - acoustic piano
- John Tropea - guitar
- Francisco Centeno - bass guitar
- Andy Newmark - drums
- Lenny Underwood - keyboards, synthesizer
- Amir Bayyan - bass guitar, keyboards
- Adil Bayyan - drums
- Isidro "Cosa" Ross - percussion
- Horns O' Plenty - horns
- Dian Sorel, Ken Williams, Krystal Davis, Vic Faster - backing vocals
- Cynthia Huggins, Gary Culpepper, Greg Fitz, Kelly Barretto, Meekaaeel Muhammad, Samaiyah Motley - backing vocals on "Stop in the Name of Love"
