= The Power of Gloria Gaynor =

Studio album by Gloria Gaynor
- Released: 1986
- Recorded: 1986
- Genre: Pop; soft rock
- Label: Stylus
- Producer: Steve Rowland

Gloria Gaynor chronology
I Am Gloria Gaynor (1984)	The Power of Gloria Gaynor (1986)	Gloria Gaynor '90 (1990)

Reissue cover
- One of the many reissued covers, this one under the name I Am What I Am.

Professional ratings
Review scores
Source	Rating
The Encyclopedia of Popular Music	2/5 stars

The Power of Gloria Gaynor, also known as The Power, or The Power of Love, is the twelfth studio album by Gloria Gaynor, released in 1986, which is composed mostly of cover versions of other popular songs from the 1970s and 1980s, and is her only album to be released on Stylus Records. It was originally only released in the UK. The album was issued on record, compact disc and cassette, each containing bonus tracks of re-recorded versions of a few of Gaynor's biggest hits in a medley and a remixed version of "Don't You Dare Call It Love".

The Power of Gloria Gaynor peaked at #81 on the UK album chart in October 1986. It has been licensed by many low-budget record labels and re-released on CD several times under different names, occasionally with other tracks by Gloria Gaynor recorded for other albums. On many reissues of the album, a cover of "Careless Whisper" is also included, which was presumably recorded for this album in London with the rest of the tracks, but went unused when the album was originally released.

The only single released was the remixed version of "Don't You Dare Call It Love", one of two tracks written by Gaynor for this release, on a 12-inch single in the UK. The B-side contained Gaynor's cover of "Every Breath You Take", originally recorded by The Police in 1983, also remixed.

== Track listing ==
No.	Title	Writer(s)	Original Artist	Length
1.	"The Eye of the Tiger"	Frankie Sullivan, Jim Peterik	Survivor	3:57
2.	"The Heat Is On"	Harold Faltermeyer, Keith Forsey	Glenn Frey	4:20
3.	"Feel So Real"	Steve Arrington	Steve Arrington	3:53
4.	"The Power of Love"	Hugh Cregg III, Chris Hayes, John Colla	Huey Lewis and the News	4:06
5.	"Everybody Wants to Rule the World"	Roland Orzabal, Ian Stanley, Chris Hughes	Tears for Fears	4:02
6.	"What a Wonderful World"	Lou Adler, Herb Alpert, Sam Cooke	Sam Cooke	3:14
7.	"Every Breath You Take"	Gordon Sumner	The Police	2:45
8.	"Don't You Dare Call It Love"	Gloria Gaynor, Linwood Simon	Original composition	4:45
9.	"Everytime You Go Away"	Daryl Hall	Hall & Oates	3:52
10.	"Broken Wings"	Richard Page, Steve George, John Lang	Mr. Mister	5:04
11.	"Suddenly"	Leslie Charles, Keith Diamond	Billy Ocean	3:40
12.	"Top Shelf"	Gloria Gaynor, Linwood Simon	Original composition	4:54
13.	"He's Out Of My Life"	Tom Bahler	Michael Jackson	3:28
14.	"I Want to Know What Love Is"	Mick Jones	Foreigner	4:05
15.	"I Will Survive / Never Can Say Goodbye / Reach Out (I'll Be There) / I Am What I Am"	Dino Fekaris and Freddie Perren / Clifton Davis / Holland–Dozier–Holland / Gerald Herman	Gloria Gaynor / Jackson 5 / Four Tops / La Cage aux Folles	9:38
16.	"Don't You Dare Call It Love" (remix)	Gloria Gaynor, Linwood Simon	Original composition	5:47
