= I Wish You Love (Gloria Gaynor album) =

Studio album by Gloria Gaynor
- Released: April 19, 2003
- Label: Logic
- Producer: Roben Allong

Gloria Gaynor chronology
The Answer (1997)	I Wish You Love (2003)	Christmas Presence (2007)

Professional ratings
Review scores
Source	Rating
The Encyclopedia of Popular Music	3/5 stars

I Wish You Love is American singer Gloria Gaynor's seventeenth album and her first international release in 18 years. It is a return to her roots in Club/Dance music, along with Urban contemporary and Contemporary R&B. The album includes two recent hit singles—2001's "Just Keep Thinking About You" (#1 on Billboard's Hot Dance Music/Club Play chart) and 2002's "I Never Knew" (also #1 Club Play, #30 Hot Adult Contemporary Tracks). First released in the United States in September 2002, the album followed in Europe in April 2003.

== American Track listing ==
1. "Gotta Be Forever" – 3:33 (Linda Clifford, Kathy Brown, Pelle Ankarberg, Niclas Molinder, Joachim Persson)
2. "Stronger" – 3:20 (Mary Brown, Fusari, Karl Kimmel)
3. "I Wish You Love" – 3:43 (Bill Lee, Balewa Muhammed, Calvin Gaines, Rob Fusari, Eritza Laues)
4. "Let It Rain" – 5:13 (Andy Goldmark, Jason Hess, Mark Mueller)
5. "Gone Too Long" – 3:02 (Lamont Dozier, Jorgen Elofsson)
6. "Just No Other Way" – 4:00 (D. Deviller, S. Hossein, J. Kugell)
7. "I Never Knew" (LP version) – 4:26 (Kasia Livingston)
8. "Just Keep Thinking About You" – 3:06 (G. Catchey, H. Johnson)
9. "No One Can Love You More" – 4:11 (Kevin Clark, Berny Cosgrove, Tim Hegarty)
10. "You Keep Running" – 3:03 (M. Brown, Fusari)
11. "I'm Here for You" – 5:12 (Gloria Gaynor, Garianno Lorenzo)
12. "All The Man That I Need" – 3:42 (Ankarberg, Persson, Molinder, Dennis)
13. "I Never Knew" (Hex Hector, HQ2 remix) – 4:16 (Livingston)
14. "Pena" (Duet with Alexandre Pires) – 4:13 (Claudia Brant)

== European Track listing ==
1. "Gotta Be Forever" – 3:33 (Linda Clifford, Kathy Brown, Pelle Ankarberg, Niclas Molinder, Joacim Persson)
2. "Gone Too Long" – 3:02 (Lamont Dozier, Jörgen Elofsson)
3. "Just No Other Way" – 4:00 (D. Deviller, S. Hossein, J. Kugell)
4. "I Never Knew" (LP version) – 4:26 (Kasia Livingston)
5. "All The Man That I Need" – 3:42 (Ankarberg, Persson, Molinder, Dennis)
6. "Just Keep Thinking About You" – 3:06 (G. Catchey, H. Johnson)
7. "I Wish You Love" – 3:43 (Bill Lee, Balewa Muhammed, Calvin Gaines, Rob Fusari, Eritza Laues)
8. "Stronger" – 3:20 (Mary Brown, Fusari, Karl Kimmel)
9. "Let It Rain" – 5:13 (Andy Goldmark, Jason Hess, Mark Mueller)
10. "No One Can Love You More" – 4:11 (Kevin Clark, Berny Cosgrove, Tim Hegarty)
11. "You Keep Running" – 3:03 (M. Brown, Fusari)
12. "I'm Here for You" – 5:12 (Gloria Gaynor, Garianno Lorenzo)
13. "I Will Survive" (English version) – 6:46 (Dino Fekaris, Freddie Perren)
14. "I Never Knew" (Hex Hector, HQ2 remix) – 4:16 (Livingston)
15. "I Will Survive (Spanglish version) – 4:42 (Fekaris, Perren)
