= I Will Survive (book) =

2009 memoir by Sunil Robert

I Will Survive: Comeback Stories of a Corporate Warrior
- First edition cover
- Author: Sunil Robert
- Language: English
- Genre: Autobiography
- Publisher: Westland Limited
- Publication date: July 2009
- Publication place: United States
- Media type: Print (Hardback and Paperback)
- ISBN: 978-8-189-97598-2

I Will Survive: Comeback Stories of a Corporate Warrior is a memoir by Sunil Robert, an author of Indian origin. The memoir follows the life of the author from his childhood in the poorer locales of Hyderabad, India to becoming a successful corporate communicator and his eventual relocation to the United States.

This Indian bestseller was endorsed by global leaders like Ratan Tata, Ramdorai and Joseph Kennedy II.

== Synopsis ==
As the eldest son from a lower middle class household, Sunil Robert began his life in Hyderabad spending his childhood without any worries. His family, though poor, was well respected in the community. Robert was popular among his friends. Life came to a rapid halt after his father lost his job and could not find another one. Robert, still very young, was forced to change with circumstances, coming to terms with his new responsibilities and learning to live with the stigma of a life on borrowed money, food, clothes and books.

As he struggled through his school and college days, he grew bitter and resentful towards his father, his extended family and the community which he lived in. Robert found himself getting involved with the local mob. However, before things got worse, Robert decided to take control of his life. With the help and support of his family and the local community, he got his life back on track. He got a job and decided never to venture back to those dark days again.

Through the rest of the memoir, Robert summarises his rise as a corporate communicator at the technology giant Tata Consultancy Services (TCS) and how he eventually dealt with his harsh feelings. He learned to forgive, raised his family responsibly - his wife, Prafullata, and his two sons, Sahil and Aman, - and finally achieved what he has made of himself today.
