= Gloria Gaynor's Park Avenue Sound =

Studio album by Gloria Gaynor
- Released: March 13, 1978
- Recorded: 1978
- Studios: Sigma Sound, Philadelphia, Pennsylvania
- Genre: Disco
- Length: 33:15
- Label: Polydor
- Producers: Tan, Joel Diamond

Gloria Gaynor chronology
Glorious (1977)	Gloria Gaynor's Park Avenue Sound (1978)	Love Tracks (1978)

Professional ratings
Review scores
Source	Rating
AllMusic	3/5 stars
The Encyclopedia of Popular Music	3/5 stars

Gloria Gaynor's Park Avenue Sound is the fifth album by Gloria Gaynor. It was released in 1978 on Polydor Records.

== History ==
Gloria Gaynor's Park Avenue Sound features the moderate hit singles "You're All I Need to Get By" and "This Love Affair," the latter co-written by Gloria Gaynor herself. The track "For the First Time in My Life" has been included in several compilations of Gaynor's work, including an album from the Universal Masters Collection series. This series of budget-friendly releases highlighted artists signed to labels under the umbrella of Universal Music Group.

The album was remastered and reissued with bonus tracks in 2013 by Big Break Records.

== Track listing ==
All tracks are written by Norman Harris, Ron Tyson and Allan Felder, except where noted.

No.	Title	Writer(s)	Length
1.	"This Love Affair"	Gloria Gaynor, Connell Johnson, Jr., Al Stewart	4:15
2.	"Part Time Love (Is a Full Time Job)"		4:19
3.	"Everytime You Make Love to Me"		4:06
4.	"For the First Time in My Life"		3:49
5.	"You're All I Need to Get By"	Nickolas Ashford, Valerie Simpson	5:11
6.	"After the Lovin'" / "Sweet Sounds for My Baby" (Medley)	Alan Bernstein, Ritchie Adams / Gloria Gaynor, Linwood Simon	6:12
7.	"Kidnapped"		5:16

2013 remastered reissue bonus tracks
No.	Title	Length
8.	"This Love Affair" (12" Disco Version)	4:16
9.	"You're All I Need to Get By" (12" Disco Version)	5:09
10.	"Everytime You Make Love to Me" (12" Disco Version)	4:05
11.	"Part Time Love (Is a Full Time Job)" (12" Disco Version)	4:42
12.	"This Love Affair" (Single Version)	2:42

== Personnel ==
- Gloria Gaynor – vocals
- Norman Harris, Bobby Eli – guitar
- Keith E. Benson – drums
- Larry Washington, James Walker – congas
- James L. Williams – bass guitar
- Bruce Gray – piano
- Ron Kersey – keyboards
- Richard Genovese, Tyrone G. Kersey, Richard Amorose, Frederick Joiner, Roger H. Delillo, Rudolph J. Malizia, Christine Reeves, Charles A. Apollonia, Anthony Sinagoga, Emma Kummrow, Americus Wm. Mungiole, Davis A. Barnett, Clarence H. Watson, John Wilson, John R. Faith – strings, horns
- Barbara Ingram, Carla Benson, Yvette Benton – backing vocals
