= I Am Gloria Gaynor =

Studio album by Gloria Gaynor
- Released: January 20, 1984
- Recorded: 1982–1983
- Genre: Pop; R&B; disco
- Length: 32:03
- Label: Silver Blue
- Producer: Joel Diamond

Gloria Gaynor chronology
Gloria Gaynor (1982)	I Am Gloria Gaynor (1984)	The Power of Gloria Gaynor (1986)

Professional ratings
Review scores
Source	Rating
The Encyclopedia of Popular Music	2/5 stars

I Am Gloria Gaynor is the eleventh studio album by Gloria Gaynor, released in 1984 by Chrysalis Records. The most notable song on the album was Gloria Gaynor's cover of "I Am What I Am" from the musical La Cage Aux Folles. It reached #82 on the Billboard Hot R&B/Hip-Hop Songs charts.

I Am Gloria Gaynor was released under the title "I Am What I Am" on CD in 1996 by Hot Productions, and included two bonus cuts from her 1978 Gloria Gaynor's Park Avenue Sound album ("After The Lovin'/Sweet Sounds For My Baby" and "You're All I Need To Get By") as track 9 and 10 respectively.

== Track listing ==
1. "I Am What I Am" (Jerry Herman)
2. "Chain of Whispers" (Mike Shepstone, Peter Dibbens)
3. "Strive" (Julius Joseph Davis, Linwood M. Simon)
4. "Eeny Meeny Macker Rack" (Miriam Stockley, Philip Lane, Stephen Idemark)
5. "Bullseye" (Elaine Lifton, Gloria Nissenson)
6. "Only In a Love Song" (Albert Pantino)
7. "I've Been Watching You" (Galen Underwood, Ken Krasner)
8. "More Than Enough" (Gaynor, Joel Diamond)
