= Glorious (Gloria Gaynor album) =

Studio album by Gloria Gaynor
- Released: February 18, 1977
- Genre: Disco
- Label: Polydor
- Producer: Gregg Diamond, Joe Beck

Gloria Gaynor chronology
I've Got You (1976)	Glorious (1977)	Gloria Gaynor's Park Avenue Sound (1978)

Professional ratings
Review scores
Source	Rating
AllMusic	2/5 stars
The Virgin Encyclopedia of R&B and Soul	2/5 stars

Glorious is American singer Gloria Gaynor's fourth studio album. It was released in 1977 on Polydor Records.

The album was remastered and reissued with bonus tracks in 2016 by Big Break Records.

== Track listing ==
No.	Title	Writer(s)	Length
1.	"Why Should I Pay"	Gregg Diamond	3:38
2.	"As Time Goes By" / "The Hands of Time" (Medley)	Herman Hupfeld / Gregg Diamond	5:05
3.	"Most of All"	Gregg Diamond	8:57
4.	"We Can Start All Over Again"	Joe Beck, George Flame	5:07
5.	"Sweet Sweet Melody"	Joe Beck, George Flame	4:25
6.	"Life Ain't Worth Living"	Melvin Seals	2:58
7.	"This Side of the Pain"	Gregg Diamond	3:15
8.	"So Much Love"	Joe Beck, George Flame	4:41

2016 remastered reissue bonus tracks
No.	Title	Length
9.	"Most of All" (Single Version)	3:26

== Personnel ==
- Gloria Gaynor – lead vocals
- Kim Carlson, Jocelyne Shaw, Angela Howell – backing vocals
- Steve Love – rhythm guitar (guitar solo on "Why I Should Pay")
- Jim Gregory – bass guitar
- Allan Schwartzberg – drums
- Don Grolnick – piano, keyboards, Fender Rhodes, clavinet
- Jack Waldman – piano, keyboards, orchestration
- Jimmy Maelen, Godfrey Diamond – percussion
- Joe Beck – guitar solo, orchestration
- Gregg Diamond – percussion, piano, orchestration
- Joe Ferguson – alto saxophone solo on "This Side of the Pain"
- George Young, Eddie Daniels, George Marge – saxophone
- Marvin Stamm, Alan Rubin, John Frosk, Peter Ecklund – trumpet
- Wayne Andre, Alan Raph, Barry Rogers – trombone
- Gene Orloff – concertmaster, strings
- Brad Baker – orchestration

Production

- Gregg Diamond, Joe Beck – producers, arrangers
- Godfrey Diamond – engineer, mixing
- Woszczyk Wieslaw, Trudy Cali, Lucy Lauri, Tom Duffy, Michael Barbiero, Jonathan Kats – assistant engineers
- Dominick Romeo, Roy Jones – mastering
- David Croland – cover
- Beverly Parker – art direction

== Charts ==
Chart performance for Glorious
Chart (1977)	Peak position
US Billboard 200	183
