= I Kinda Like Me =

Studio album by Gloria Gaynor
- Released: June 15, 1981
- Studio: Sigma Sound, Philadelphia, Pennsylvania
- Genre: Disco; R&B
- Label: Polydor
- Producer: Gene McFadden, John Whitehead, Jerry Cohen

Gloria Gaynor chronology
Stories (1980)	I Kinda Like Me (1981)	Gloria Gaynor (1982)

Professional ratings
Review scores
Source	Rating
The Encyclopedia of Popular Music	2/5 stars

I Kinda Like Me is the ninth album by Gloria Gaynor. It failed to make an impact because of the then current, now defunct Disco backlash. Includes the single, "Let's Mend What's Been Broken." "I Love You Cause" was dedicated to her then husband and manager, Linwood M. Simon.

This album was reissued on CD in Japan by Polydor (POCP-2182).

== Track listing ==
Side one
No.	Title	Writer(s)	Length
1.	"I Kinda Like Me"	Gloria Gaynor, Eddie Sierra	6:12
2.	"Fingers in the Fire"	Gloria Gaynor, Eddie Sierra	3:20
3.	"Let's Mend What's Been Broken"	Gene McFadden, John Whitehead, Jerry Cohen	4:27
4.	"Yesterday We Were Like Buddies"	Gene McFadden, John Whitehead, Victor Carstarphen	5:52

Side two
No.	Title	Writer(s)	Length
5.	"I Can Stand the Pain"	Gloria Gaynor, Eddie Sierra	4:26
6.	"I Love You Cause"	Gloria Gaynor, Eddie Sierra	5:02
7.	"When You Get Around to It"	Gloria Gaynor, Pam Tillis, Dana Thomas	3:58
8.	"Chasin' Me into Somebody Else's Arms"	Mark Barkan, Ritchie Adams	5:16
9.	"The Story of the Joneses"	Alfie Davison, Meri Merriwether, Ted Lehrman	3:26

== Personnel ==
- Gloria Gaynor - lead vocals
- Dennis Harris, Eddie Sierra, Roland Chambers - guitar
- Jimmy Williams - bass guitar
- Jerry Cohen - keyboards, synthesizer
- Keith Benson - drums
- Daryl Burgee - bongos
- Sam Peake - saxophone, horn arrangements
- Don Renaldo - string arrangements
- Barbara Ingram, Carla Benson, Evette Benton - backing vocals

=== Technical ===
- Dirk Devlin - engineer
- Robert L. Heimall - art direction
- Anthony Barboza - photography
