= Never Can Say Goodbye (Gloria Gaynor album) =

Studio album by Gloria Gaynor
- Released: January 23, 1975
- Recorded: 1974
- Studio: Mediasound (New York City)
- Genre: Disco; R&B
- Length: 33:58
- Label: MGM
- Producer: Paul Leka, Tony Bongiovi, Meco Monardo, Jay Ellis

Gloria Gaynor chronology
Never Can Say Goodbye (1975)	Experience Gloria Gaynor (1975)

Singles from Never Can Say Goodbye
- 1. "Honey Bee" Released: January 1974; 2. "Never Can Say Goodbye" Released: October 27, 1974; 3. "Reach Out, I'll Be There" Released: March 12, 1975; 4. "All I Need Is Your Sweet Lovin'" Released: August 1975

Professional ratings
Review scores
Source	Rating
AllMusic	4.5/5 stars
Christgau's Record Guide	B
The Encyclopedia of Popular Music	4/5 stars
The Rolling Stone Album Guide	3.5/5 stars

Never Can Say Goodbye is the debut album by Gloria Gaynor, released on MGM Records in January 1975. It is most notable for including several early disco recordings. The album charted in the US Billboard at number 25 in the US Pop chart, and at number 21 in the US R&B chart. In the UK the album peaked at number 32, "Never Can Say Goodbye" was released in the UK as a single and reached number 2 in early 1975.

== History ==
The album includes three hit singles – "Honey Bee", "Never Can Say Goodbye", and "Reach Out, I'll Be There" – which are in full-length six minute versions on the album's first side in a 19-minute disco suite, then a famous first devised by Tom Moulton (not credited on the record itself). The album version of "Never Can Say Goodbye" has double drum beats during the verse links, which is not heard in the single version. Gloria Gaynor was involved in the songwriting of two tracks, including "Real Good People".

The album was remastered and reissued with bonus tracks in 2010 by Big Break Records.

== Track listing ==
No.	Title	Writer(s)	Length
1.	"Honey Bee"	Mervin Steals, Melvin Steals, Matthew Ledbetter	6:00
2.	"Never Can Say Goodbye"	Clifton Davis	6:18
3.	"Reach Out, I'll Be There"	Holland–Dozier–Holland	6:15
4.	"All I Need Is Your Sweet Lovin'"	Bobby Flax, Larry Lambert	2:47
5.	"Searchin'"	Casey Spencer	2:55
6.	"We Belong Together"	Lester Hodelin, Patricia Shells	2:51
7.	"False Alarm"	Don Coan, Gloria Gaynor	3:40
8.	"Real Good People"	Gloria Gaynor	3:02

2010 remastered reissue bonus tracks
No.	Title	Length
9.	"Honeybee" (Columbia Single Version)	3:44
10.	"All It Took Boy Was Losing You" (B-Side)	5:14
11.	"Come Tonight" (B-Side)	2:38
12.	"Never Can Say Goodbye" (Single Version)	2:59
13.	"We Just Can't Make It" (B-Side)	3:16
14.	"Reach Out, I'll Be There" (Single Version)	3:06
15.	"Honey Bee" (MGM Single Version)	2:56

== Personnel ==
- Gloria Gaynor – vocals
- Lance Quinn, Jerry Freidman, Jeff Mironov – electric guitar
- Bob Babbitt – bass guitar
- Pat Rebillot – electric piano
- Carlos Martin – congas
- Allan Schwartzberg – drums

=== Production ===
- Meco Monardo – arrangers
- Norman Harris – arrangers
- Harold Wheeler – arrangers
- Lou Del Gatto – arrangers
- Tony Bongiovi – producer
- Meco Monardo – producer
- Jay Ellis – producer
- Paul Leka – producer
- Tony Bongiovi – recording engineer
- Bernie Block – cover photography
- David Krieger – cover design
- Bill Leby – art direction
- Tom Moulton – mixing

== Charts ==
=== Weekly charts ===
Weekly chart performance for Never Can Say Goodbye
Chart (1975)	Peak position
Australian Albums (Kent Music Report)	8
Dutch Albums (Album Top 100)	6
German Albums (Offizielle Top 100)	12
Swedish Albums (Sverigetopplistan)	37
UK Albums (OCC)	32
US Billboard 200	25
US Top R&B/Hip-Hop Albums (Billboard)	21

=== Monthly charts ===
Monthly chart performance for Never Can Say Goodbye
Chart (1977)	Peak position
Soviet International Albums (MK)	1

=== Year-end charts ===
Year-end chart performance for Never Can Say Goodbye
Chart (1975)	Position
German Albums (Offizielle Top 100)	15

== Certifications and sales ==
Region	Certification	Certified units/sales
Argentina (CAPIF)	Gold	30,000^{^}
Australia (ARIA)	Gold	20,000^{^}
Canada (Music Canada)	Gold	50,000^{^}
France (SNEP)	Gold	100,000^{*}
United Kingdom (BPI)	Silver	60,000^{^}
^{*} Sales figures based on certification alone.^{^} Shipments figures based on certification alone.
