= Tom Moulton =

American record producer (born 1940)

Thomas Jerome Moulton (/ˈmoʊltən/, MOHL-tən; born November 29, 1940) is an American record producer. He experimented with remix in disco music and this led to its wide adoption as a standard practice in the industry. He also invented the breakdown section, and the twelve-inch single vinyl format in the process.

== Life and career ==
Moulton was born in Schenectady, New York, United States, as the oldest of five children to parents who both were jazz musicians. He worked as a model at the Bookings and Ford agencies before beginning his production career. Before that, he had worked in the music industry, firstly as a child working part-time in record shops, then holding a sales and promotion job at King Records (from 1959 to 1961), and similar positions at RCA and United Artists. He eventually left due to his disgust at the industry's dishonesty. His music career restarted in the late 1960s, with a self-made tape of overlapping songs created for the Fire Island bar and restaurant, The Sandpiper.

He was responsible for the first continuous-mix album side, on Gloria Gaynor's disco album Never Can Say Goodbye, earning him the title of "father of the disco mix." Among some of his other successes in mixing songs are The Three Degrees' "Dirty Ol' Man", MFSB featuring The Three Degrees' "Love Is the Message", B.T. Express' "Do It ('Til You're Satisfied)", Tamiko Jones's "Let It Flow", Sarah Dash's "Sinner Man", Michele's (Chantal Curtis) "Disco Dance", The Trammps' "Disco Inferno", People's Choice's "Do It Any Way You Wanna", Andrea True's "More, More, More", plus First Choice's "Doctor Love" as well as "Armed and Extremely Dangerous" and Claudja Barry's album, The Girl Most Likely.

Between 1977 and 1979, he produced Grace Jones's first three albums, including one of the singer's biggest hits, her rendition of Édith Piaf's "La Vie en rose".

Moulton's innovative work was honored at the 2004 Dance Music Hall of Fame ceremony in New York City, when he was inducted for his achievements as a remixer. He is the official archivist of the Bethlehem Jazz and Salsoul music catalogues and has overseen all of the digital remastering. In late 2006, Moulton remixed the Brand New Heavies (featuring N'Dea Davenport)'s single "I Don't Know (Why I Love You)".

In 2006, a compilation of Moulton's mixes titled A Tom Moulton Mix was released on Soul Jazz Records. The British label Harmless Records has released albums of Moulton's work of remixed tracks, originally issued on Philadelphia International and other Philly soul labels, mainly during the 1970s.
