= Gloria Gaynor =

American singer (born 1943)

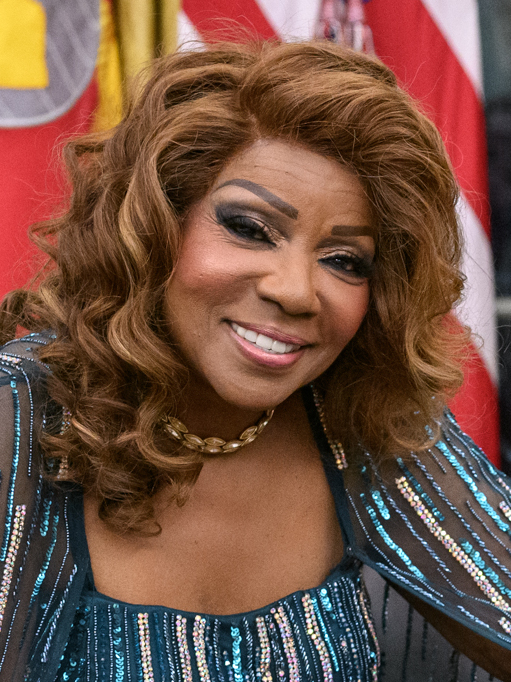
- Gaynor in 2025

Background information
- Born: Gloria Fowles; September 7, 1943 (age 82); Newark, New Jersey, U.S.
- Genres: Disco; R&B; soul; post-disco
- Occupations: Singer; songwriter; actress
- Instrument: Vocals
- Works: Gloria Gaynor discography
- Years active: 1965–present
- Labels: Jocida; MGM; Polydor; Chrysalis; Stylus; Hot Productions; Logic; Radikal
- Spouse: Linwood Simon (m. 1979; div. 2005)
- Website: gloriagaynor.com

Gloria Fowles (born September 7, 1943), known professionally as Gloria Gaynor, is an American singer, best known for the disco era hits "I Will Survive" (1978) which is one of the best-selling singles in history to date, having sold over 15 million copies worldwide, and "Let Me Know (I Have a Right)" (1979), "I Am What I Am" (1983), and her version of "Never Can Say Goodbye" (1974). She received the Kennedy Center Honor in 2025.

== Early life ==
Gloria Fowles was born in Newark, New Jersey, to Daniel Fowles and Queenie Mae Proctor. Her grandmother lived nearby and was involved in her upbringing. "There was always music in our house", Gaynor wrote in her autobiography I Will Survive. She enjoyed listening to the radio, and to records by Nat King Cole and Sarah Vaughan. Her father played the ukulele and guitar and sang professionally in nightclubs with a group called Step 'n' Fetchit. Gloria grew up as a tomboy; she had five brothers and one sister. Her brothers sang gospel and formed a quartet with a friend.

Gaynor was not allowed to sing with the all-male group, nor was her younger brother Arthur, as Gloria was a girl and Arthur was too young. Arthur later acted as a tour manager for Gaynor. The family was relatively poor, but Gaynor recalls the house being filled with laughter and happiness, and the dinner table being open to neighborhood friends. They moved to a housing project in 1960, where Gaynor attended South Side High School; she graduated in 1961.

"All through my young life I wanted to sing, although nobody in my family knew it", Gaynor wrote in her autobiography. Gaynor began singing in a nightclub in Newark, where she was recommended to a local band by a neighbor. After several years of performing in local clubs and along the East Coast, Gaynor was signed in 1971 at Columbia Records.

== Music career ==
=== Early years ===
Gaynor was a singer with The Soul Satisfiers, a jazz and R&B music band of the 1960s. She recorded "She'll Be Sorry" as Gloria Gaynor in 1965, for Johnny Nash's "Jocida" label. Her first real success came in 1973 when she was signed to Columbia Records by Clive Davis. The fruit of that was the release of the single "Honey Bee".

Moving on to MGM Records she finally hit with the album Never Can Say Goodbye, released in 1975. The first side of the album consisted of three songs ("Honey Bee", "Never Can Say Goodbye", and "Reach Out, I'll Be There"), with no break between the songs. This 19-minute dance marathon proved to be enormously popular, especially at dance clubs. All three songs were released as singles via radio edits and all of them became hits. The album was instrumental in introducing disco music to the public, "Never Can Say Goodbye" becoming the first song to top Billboard magazine's dance chart. It was also a hit on the mainstream Pop Charts, peaking at No. 9, and on the R&B Charts, reaching No. 34 (the original version by The Jackson 5 had been a No. 2 hit on the Hot 100 in 1971). It also marked her first significant chart success internationally, making it into the Top 5 in Australia, Canada, Germany and the UK. The song would go on to be certified silver by the British Phonographic Industry, and subsequently gold in the US.

Gaynor released her next album, Experience Gloria Gaynor, in September 1975. The singles "Honey Bee" (1974), "Casanova Brown" (1975), and "Let's Make a Deal" (1976), as well as her cover of the Four Tops' "Reach Out, I'll Be There", became hits in nightclubs and reached the Top 5 on Billboard's disco charts. "(If You Want It) Do It Yourself" was a No. 1 disco hit—peaking at No. 98 on the Pop Charts and No. 24 on the R&B Charts. Gaynor's cover of "How High the Moon" topped the US Dance Charts, and made the lower parts of both the pop and R&B charts, as well as achieving some international chart success. She has recorded some 16 albums since her 1976 album I've Got You, including one in England, one in Germany, and two in Italy.

=== Major mainstream breakthrough ===
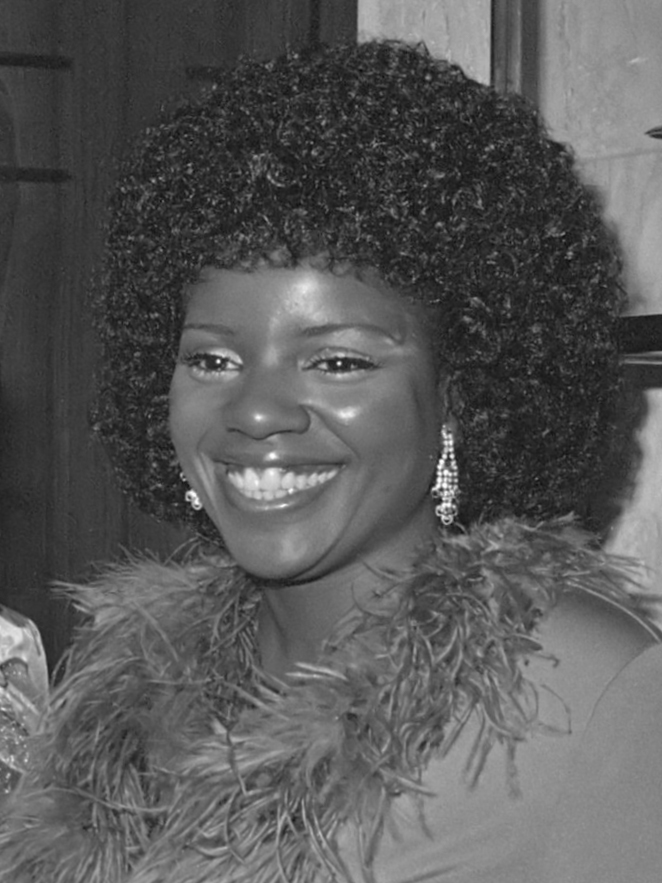
Gaynor in 1976

During the next few years, Gaynor released two albums Glorious and Gloria Gaynor's Park Avenue Sound, but would only enjoy a few more moderate hits. However, in late 1978, with the release of her album Love Tracks, she climbed the pop charts again with her smash hit single "I Will Survive". The lyrics of this song were written from the point of view of a woman, recently dumped, telling her former lover that she can cope without him and does not want anything more to do with him. The song has become something of an anthem of female emancipation. Originally, "I Will Survive" was a B-side when Polydor Records released it in late 1978. The A-side, a song called "Substitute", then a recent worldwide hit for South African girl-group Clout, was considered more "radio friendly". Gaynor won a Grammy for "I Will Survive" at the 22nd Annual Grammy Awards, and also received nominations for Grammy Award for Record of the Year and Best Female Pop Vocal Performance. "I Will Survive" is ranked No. 492 on Rolling Stone's list of "The 500 Greatest Songs of All Time", and ranked at No. 97 on Billboard magazine's "All-Time Hot 100".

As a disco number, the song was unique for its time by virtue of Gaynor's having no background singers or lush production. And, unlike her first disco hits, the track was not pitched up to make it faster and to render Gaynor's recorded voice in a higher register than that in which she actually sang. In late 1979, she released the album I Have a Right, containing her next disco hit, "Let Me Know (I Have a Right)", which featured Doc Severinsen of The Tonight Show Starring Johnny Carson fame, playing a trumpet solo. Gaynor also recorded a disco song called "Love Is Just a Heartbeat Away" in 1979 for the cult vampire film Nocturna: Granddaughter of Dracula, which featured several of disco songs.

=== Stateside career ===
In 1980 and again in 1981, Gaynor released two disco albums that were virtually ignored in the United States due to the backlash against disco, which began late in 1979. The album's singles barely registered on urban contemporary radio, where disco music remained popular. In 1982, having looked into a wide variety of faiths and religious movements, she became a Christian and began to distance herself from a past she considered to be sinful. That same year, she released an album of mid-tempo R&B and pop-style songs entitled Gloria Gaynor.

Gaynor would achieve her final success in the 1980s with the release of her album I Am Gloria Gaynor in 1984. This was mainly due to the song "I Am What I Am", which became a hit at dance clubs, and then on the Club Play chart in late 1983/early 1984. "I Am What I Am" became a gay anthem and made Gaynor a gay icon. Her 1986 album, The Power of Gloria Gaynor, was almost entirely composed of cover versions of other songs that were popular at the time.

=== Career revival ===
Gaynor's career received a revitalizing spark in the early- and mid-1990s with the worldwide disco revival movement. During the late 1990s, she dabbled in acting for a while, guest-starring on The Wayans Bros, That '70s Show (singing "I Will Survive"), and Ally McBeal, before doing a limited engagement performance in Broadway's Smokey Joe's Cafe. In 2001, Gaynor performed "I Will Survive" at the 30th Anniversary concert for Michael Jackson.

Gaynor returned to the recording studio in 2002, releasing her first album in more than 15 years, I Wish You Love. The two singles released from the album, "Just Keep Thinking About You" and "I Never Knew", both topped Billboard's Hot Dance Music/Club Play. Both singles also secured moderate to heavy dance format radio airplay. The latter song also charted No. 30 on Billboard's Adult Contemporary chart. In 2004, Gaynor re-released her 1997 album The Answer (also released under the title What a Life) as a follow-up to her successful album I Wish You Love. The album includes her club hit "Oh, What a Life".

In late 2002, Gaynor appeared with R&B stars on the "Rhythm, Love, and Soul" edition of the PBS series American Soundtrack. Her performance of the disco hit "I Will Survive" and new single "I Never Knew" was included on the accompanying live album that was released in 2004.

On September 19, 2005, Gaynor was honored twice when she and her music were inducted into the Dance Music Hall of Fame, in the "Artist" category, along with fellow disco artists Chic and Sylvester. Her classic anthem "I Will Survive" was inducted under the "Records" category. In January 2008, the American Diabetes Association named Gaynor the Honorary Spokesperson of the 2008 "NYC Step Out to Fight Diabetes Walk".

More television appearances followed in the late 2000s with 2009 appearances on The John Kerwin Show, The Wendy Williams Show, and The View to promote the 30th anniversary of "I Will Survive". In 2010, she appeared on Last Comic Standing and The Tonight Show with Jay Leno. Gaynor released a contemporary Christian album in late 2013.

Forty years after its release, Gaynor continues to ride the success of "I Will Survive", touring the country and the world over and performing her signature song on dozens of TV shows. A few successful remixes of the song during the 1990s and 2000s along with new versions of the song by Lonnie Gordon, Diana Ross, Chantay Savage, rock group Cake and others, as well as constant recurrent airplay on nearly all soft AC and rhythmic format radio stations have helped to keep the song in the mainstream. Gaynor said of her biggest hit in a 2012 interview: "It feels great to have such a song like that because I get kids five and six years old telling me they like the song, and then people seventy-five and eighty. It's quite an honor." The song was revived yet again in 2015 for the film The Martian, where it is used at the end as the credits roll.

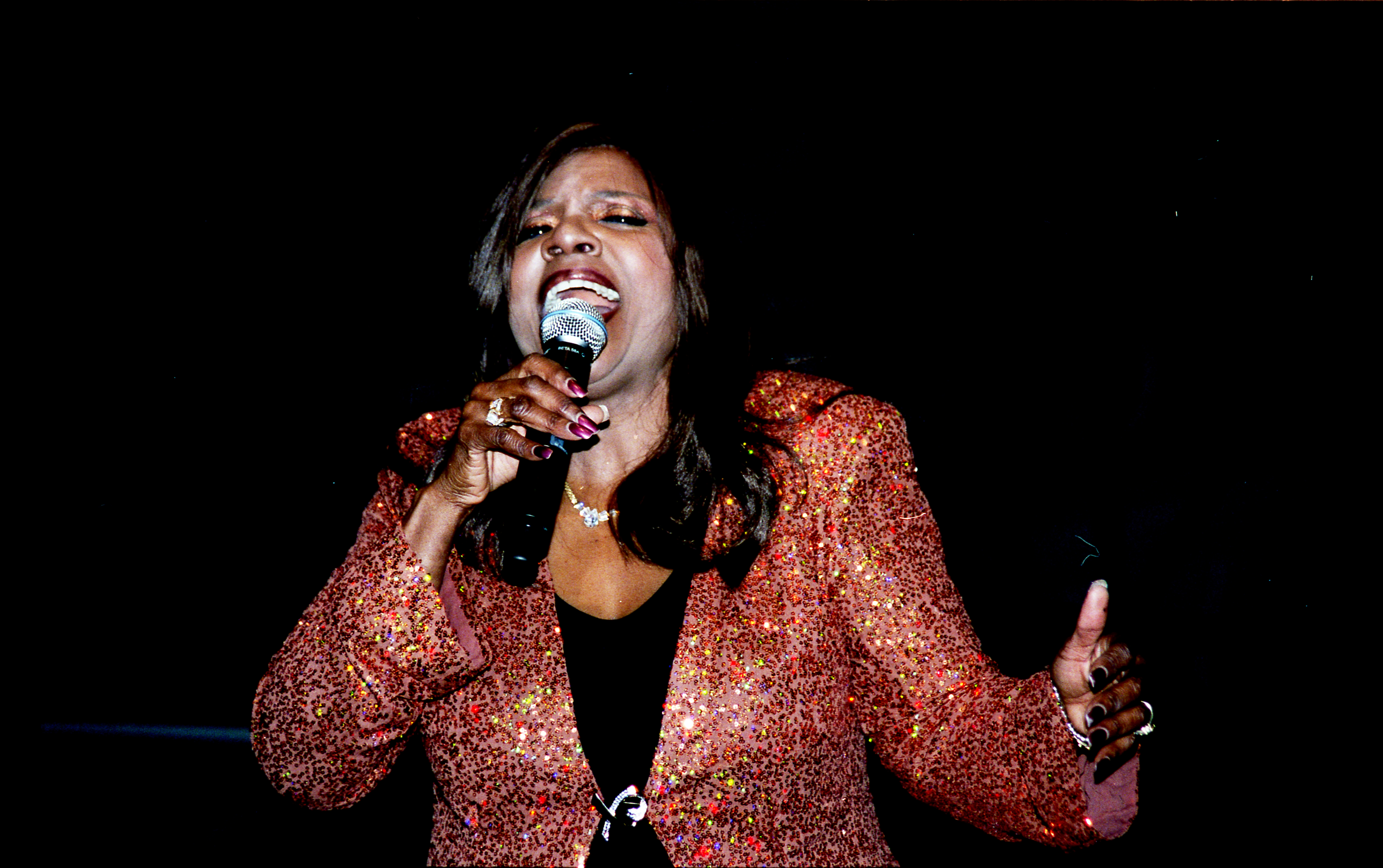
Gaynor performing in 2012

On May 16, 2015, Gaynor was awarded the honorary degree of Doctor of Music by Dowling College. In 2017, she made a cameo appearance as a flight attendant in a Capital One commercial, while Samuel L. Jackson, Charles Barkley, and Spike Lee sang "I Will Survive".

In 2016, "I Will Survive" was selected for induction into the Library of Congress' National Recording Registry.

On May 6, 2017, Gaynor performed with her band at the Library of Congress' celebration of disco music at Bibliodiscotheque, a disco dance party in the Great Hall of the Thomas Jefferson Building.

Due to the devastation wreaked by Hurricane Harvey on the state of Texas in August 2017, Gaynor rewrote the lyrics to "I Will Survive", changing the title to "Texas Will Survive", and posted a video of herself singing the song on Twitter on August 30, 2017.

In December 2019, "I Will Survive" trended on TikTok and Gaynor performed the dance at the LifeMinute TV studios in Times Square, NY.

In January 2020, she won her second Grammy Award in her career, 40 years after her first, for her roots gospel album Testimony, winning Best Roots Gospel Album at the 62nd Annual Grammy Awards.

In 2021, Gaynor returned to disco music when she recorded "Can't Stop Writing Songs About You" with Australian singer Kylie Minogue for the reissue of Minogue's fifteenth studio album Disco entitled Disco: Guest List Edition. The collaboration occurred following Gaynor praising Minogue for keeping disco alive with her album of the same name.

In April 2021, Gaynor recorded "Brand New" with the veteran Contemporary Christian band MercyMe.

In 2022, Gaynor competed in season eight of The Masked Singer as "Mermaid" who rode around on a giant clam-like vehicle that the Men in Black had to push around. After being eliminated on "Andrew Lloyd Webber Night" alongside Mario Cantone as "Maize", Gaynor did her encore performance of "I Will Survive".

On February 7, 2025, Gaynor released "Fida Known", the lead single to her EP "Happy Tears" and her first solo release since 2019. This was then followed up by the EP's second single, "When I See You", on May 9, 2025. The EP was released on June 6, 2025.

On August 13, 2025, President Donald Trump named Gaynor as one of the honorees for the annual Kennedy Center Honors, to be presented in December 2025.

== Personal life ==
Gaynor married her manager Linwood Simon in 1979. The couple divorced in 2005. She has no children. According to Gaynor, while she always wanted children, her ex-husband never desired any. She is also a supporter of and financial donor to the Republican Party.

== Discography ==
Albums:

- Never Can Say Goodbye (1975)
- Experience Gloria Gaynor (1975)
- I've Got You (1976)
- Glorious (1977)
- Gloria Gaynor's Park Avenue Sound (1978)
- Love Tracks (1978)
- I Have a Right (1979)
- Stories (1980)
- I Kinda Like Me (1981)
- Gloria Gaynor (1982)
- I Am Gloria Gaynor (1984)
- The Power of Gloria Gaynor (1986)
- Gloria Gaynor '90 (1990)
- Love Affair (1992)
- I'll Be There (1994)
- The Answer (1997)
- I Wish You Love (2003)
- Christmas Presence (2007)
- We Will Survive (2013)
- Testimony (2019)

Extended Plays:

- Happy Tears (2025)

== Filmography ==
=== Film ===
Year	Title	Role	Notes
1979	Pinay, American Style	Herself	
2006	Gray Matters	Herself	
2022	The Thursday Night Club	Dr. Poitier	

=== Television ===
Year	Title	Role	Notes
1979	The Second City Comedy Show	Herself	TV special
1979	Sha Na Na	Herself	Episode: "3.6"
1997	The Wayans Bros.	Herself	Episode: "Pops' Last Hurrah"
1998	Starye Pesni O Glavnom 3	Herself	TV movie
1999	That 70's Show	Mrs. Clark	Episode: "Prom Night"
2000	Ally McBeal	Herself	Episode: "I Will Survive"
2022	The Masked Singer	Herself/Mermaid	2 episodes
2024	Masked Singer France (Season 6)	Herself/Ice Queen	Guest

== See also ==
- List of artists who reached number one in the United States
- List of artists who reached number one on the U.S. Dance Club Songs chart
- List of best-selling singles
- List of Billboard number-one dance club songs
- Lists of Billboard number-one singles
