= The Answer (album) =

Studio album by Gloria Gaynor
- Released: October 24, 1997
- Genre: R&B
- Label: Personal Records, Florical Music
- Producer: Christian P. Schneider, Don Oriolo

Gloria Gaynor chronology
I'll Be There (1994)	The Answer (1997)	I Wish You Love (2002)

The Answer is the 16th album by singer-songwriter Gloria Gaynor. It was released in France on October 24, 1997. A version with a slightly different track list was released in Germany, under the title What a Life. The Answer includes the singles "Oh, What a Life", "Rippin' It Up", "Perfect World" and "Set Me Free". It was re-released under the original title in 2004.

== Singles ==
"Oh, What a Life" was released as single from the album. The single was more successful in Europe than America, reaching No.14 on the Italian chart and being remixed and covered as club versions.

== Track listing ==
All tracks composed by Christian P. Schneider and Don Oriolo; except where indicated

=== Original release ===
1. "You'll Be Mine" (Gloria Gaynor, Dirk Sengotta)
2. "Rippin' It Up" (Harriet Roberts, Russell Courtenay)
3. "Oh, What a Life"
4. "You" (Christian P. Schneider, Don Oriolo, Gloria Gaynor)
5. "Reunion"
6. "Perfect World"
7. "The Answer" (Gloria Gaynor)
8. "Jealousy" (Don Oriolo)
9. "It's My Time"
10. "Set Me Free"
11. "Oh What a Life" (Remix)
12. "Rippin' It Up" (Remix)
13. "Perfect World" (Remix)
14. "Mighty High" (Remix)
15. "Yo viviré (I Will Survive)" (Flamenco)

=== German edition – named What a Life ===
1. "Oh, What a Life"
2. "Mighty High"
3. "Rippin' It Up"
4. "You"
5. "You'll Be Mine"
6. "The Answer"
7. "Can't Take My Eyes Off You"
8. "Reunion of Two Hearts"
9. "Perfect World"
10. "It's My Time"
11. "Set Me Free"
12. "Jealousy"
13. "Rippin' It Up" (Remix)
14. "Can't Take My Eyes off You" (Remix)
15. "Perfect World" (Remix)

=== 2004 reissue ===
1. "You'll Be Mine"
2. "Rippin' It Up"
3. "You"
4. "You Are the Answer"
5. "Set Me Free"
6. "Oh, What a Life"
7. "It's My Time"
8. "Reunion of Two Hearts"
9. "Perfect World"
10. "In All Ways a Woman"
11. "Jealousy"
12. "Mighty High"
13. "Hallelujah"
14. "Rippin It Up" (Remix)
15. "Set Me Free" (Remix)
16. "Oh, What a Life" (Remix)
17. "Perfect World" (Remix)
