= Tim Shaw =

Tim Shaw may refer to:

- Tim Shaw (presenter) (born 1974), British radio personality and TV presenter
- Tim Shaw (American football) (born 1984), American football player
- Tim Shaw (salesperson), Australian after dinner speaker and television personality
- Tim Shaw (cricketer) (born 1959), South African cricketer
- Tim Shaw (swimmer) (born 1957), American swimmer
- Tim Shaw (comedian), American stand-up comedian and voice over actor
- Tim Shaw (sculptor) (born 1964), Northern Irish contemporary sculptor
- Timothy M. Shaw, Canadian political scientist

== See also ==
- Timmy Shaw, American R&B singer
