= Gene Pierson =

New Zealand musician (born 1946)

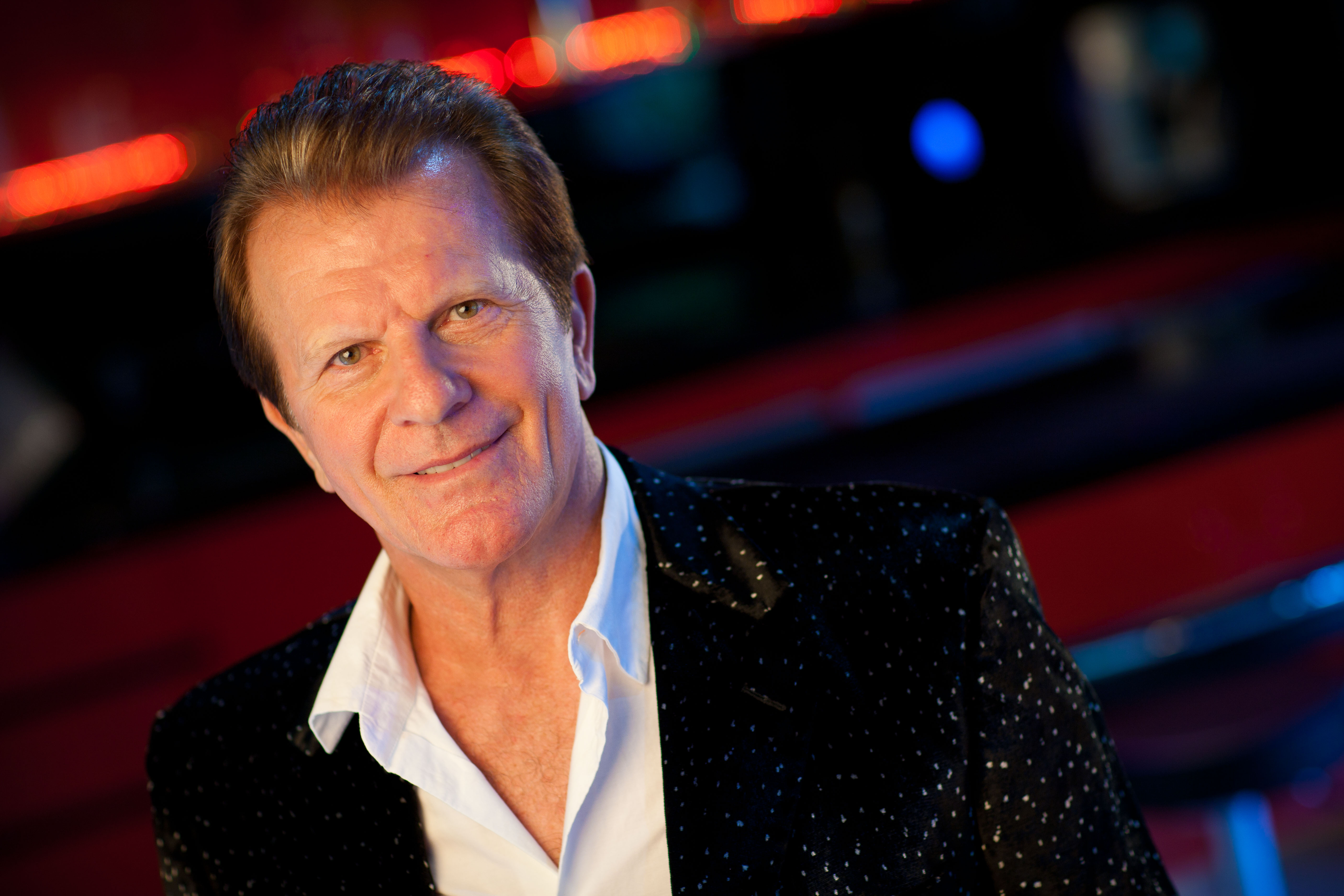

Background information
- Also known as: Gene Pierson
- Born: Giancarlo Salvestrin; 29 April 1946 (age 80); Venice, Italy
- Origin: Auckland, North Island, New Zealand
- Occupations: Musician, songwriter, record label owner, producer, promoter, tourism operator
- Years active: 1966–present
- Labels: Zodiac, Festival, Infinity Records, Philips Records
- Formerly of: The Inturns
- Website: genepierson.com.au

Gene Pierson (born Giancarlo Salvestrin, 29 April 1946) is a musician, who had an early solo career in New Zealand and then in Australia. His 1960s and early 1970s songs, "Love, Love, Love", "You Got to Me" and "Reach Out", achieved local chart success in Australia and New Zealand. He launched AC/DC at Chequers nightclub on New Year's Eve 1974 and later became a publisher and music producer in Australia.

His more recent business ventures include the acquisition of the Peter Lik Publishing Group, founding the Lifestyle Music label distributed by Sony Music Australia, and founding Music Hive, an online streaming service for retailers.

== Biography ==
Gene Pierson was born Giancarlo Salvestrin (29 April 1946) in Venice. In August 1949 his father, Ernesto, migrated to Sydney via migrant ship, Napoli. In February 1950, at the age of three, Pierson and his mother Emma followed on Ugolino Vivaldi, settling in Griffith, New South Wales. Pierson attended Patrician Brothers' College, Fairfield.

=== Early career ===
In 1963 Pierson, under the stage name Gene Chandler, won a talent quest at Skelseys Hotel, singing "Mashed Potato", in the western suburbs of Sydney, which was the beginning of his career in the entertainment business. He was given a regular solo spot at the hotel, where he was approached by guitarist Graham Ford to become the fifth member of a Western Suburbs band, The Inturns.

The Inturns were subsequently managed by Eileen Harrigan, the wife of John Harrigan, who owned Surf City in Kings Cross and managed a number of leading "beat" bands in Sydney. The Inturns supported a number of popular local acts, including Billy Thorpe & The Aztecs, and Ray Brown & The Whispers as well as headlining at Suzi Wong's The Beach House and Stagecoach venues.

Pierson was then offered a six-month resident spot at The Bowl nightclub in Pitt Street, Sydney.

In December 1965 Pierson received news that his father, Ernesto, had a brain tumour and meanwhile Pierson was due to be conscripted into the army to serve during the Vietnam War. He was due to report to Duntroon military base within days however, following advice from the La De Da's guitarist Kevin Borich, he travelled to New Zealand, which had no passport requirement, thereby evading his conscription.

Running low on cash in Auckland, he bluffed his way into the Galaxie nightclub, saying he was Gene Chandler, a top performer from Sydney, and would do a guest spot for free entry. In the audience was Eldred Stebbing who managed and recorded Ray Columbus, Max Merritt & The Meteors and the La De Da's on his Zodiac label.

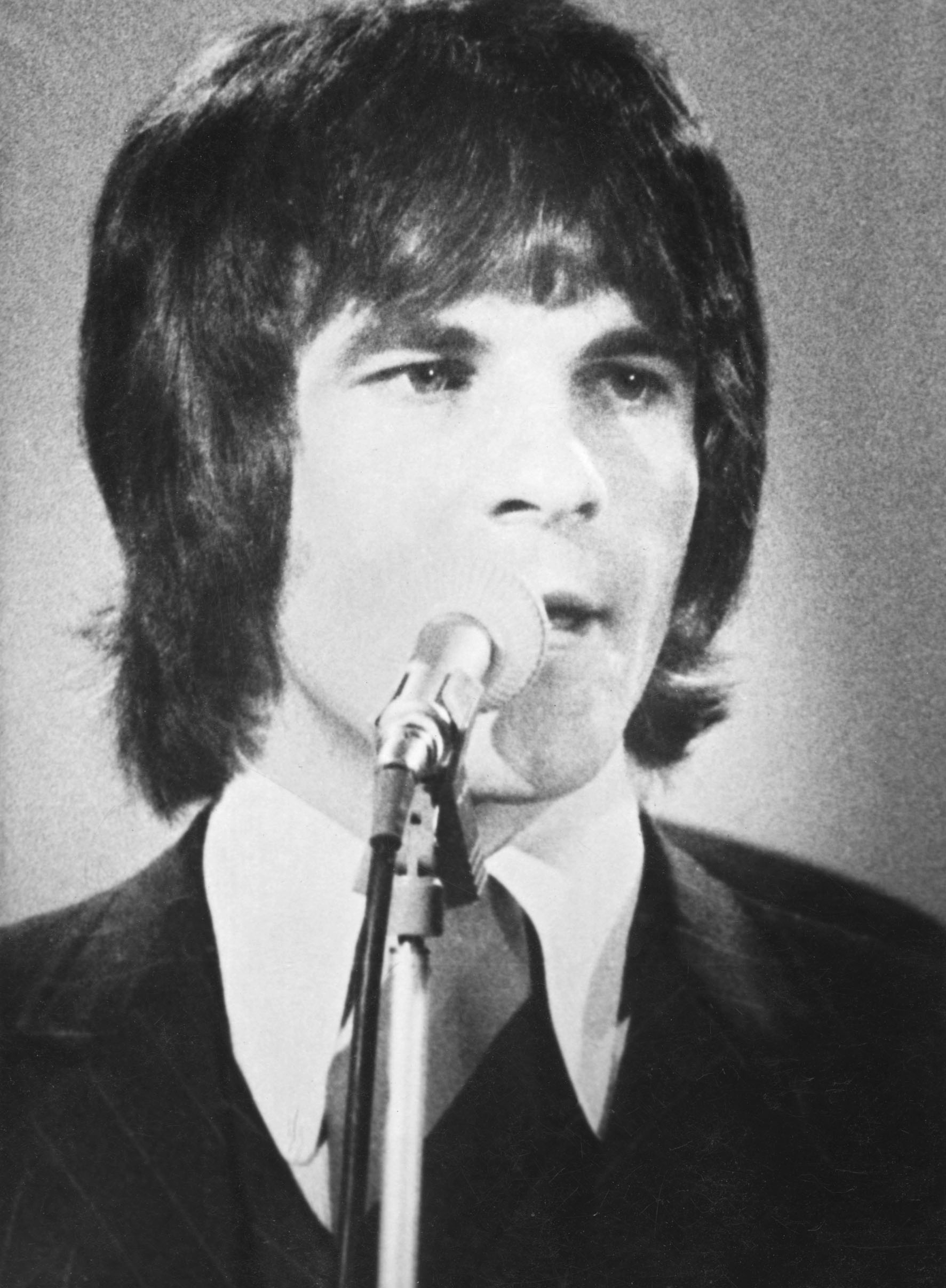
Gene Pierson on Bandstand in 1970

Stebbing was impressed and ended up managing Pierson encouraging him to change his stage name as there was already an American singer named Gene Chandler (aka "Duke of Earl"). The story is that Stebbing spotted a poster for Pearson's Soap over the singer's shoulder and both agreed with a change in spelling to Pierson. After signing with Stebbing's Zodiac label, temporary accommodation was arranged and Salvestrin (now Pierson) had a regular gig and income. He also appeared regularly with Wellington group, Cheshire Katt.

Pierson had success with a Bobby Hebb song, "Love, Love Love"/"Celeste", which become a number one hit on the Radio Hauraki charts in October 1967. This was followed by "You Got To Me"/"Rainy Day in June" which reached number two spot. This was first time anyone had done a cover version of a Neil Diamond song outside of the US – a medal commemorating this was later presented to Pierson by Diamond's manager. Both singles were also released in Australia on the Philips label. In 1968 Pierson released, "Toyland"/"Matchstick in a Whirlpool", which originally recorded by UK group Alan Bown Set featuring Robert Palmer on vocals, which was then followed later that year by "If You Only Loved Me"/"Just One Tender Look", neither of which had the same success as the earlier singles.

Pierson was featured in Playdate, Groove and a number of women's magazines, alongside the British and American pop stars of the time. He was working four nights a week, regularly appearing on television and touring with artists including Tommy Adderley, Larry's Rebels, Shane, The Chicks, Simple Image and the La De Da's.

In 1969 he switched labels to Festival Records releasing "Leaving on a Jet Plane"/"I Ain't No Miracle Worker" and in 1970 a cover of the Four Tops song "Reach Out"/"Oh Sweet Lord", which received airplay in Australia and became a minor chart success over there, reaching No. 12 on the Sydney charts.

=== Returning to Australia ===
During the recording of an album with producer and blind keyboard player Claude Papesch, Gene Pierson learned of his father's death and returned to Australia for the funeral.

He quickly leveraged his New Zealand success, signing with Festival Records and releasing a psychedelic make-over of the Four Tops song "Reach Out", backed by New Zealand's Simple Image who were resident in Sydney at the time.

However, a long-standing disagreement between radio stations and record labels put an end to the song's journey up the charts. Record companies were refusing to supply free new release records unless radio stations agreed to pay a new royalty, resulting in a six-month radio ban on airplay for Australian and British recordings released by major labels.

As part of his contract Pierson released "See My Way"/"Teach Me How To Fly" on the Infinity label in 1970, followed in 1971 by "Story"/"Bye Bye Love" and "Come on In"/"The Only Living Boy in New York". He then ended his contract with Festival and went on to co-host the nationwide weekly pop gossip programme the Today Show with Bruce Webster and Patty Lovell, which led to the first video music TV show on Channel 7 called Sounds.

The same year, he also hosted his own weekly segment, Today Pop, on Channel 7’s Today Show and wrote for Go-Set pop paper. For the publication he covered Elton John's first concert at the Troubador in Los Angeles, interviewed musicians Lou Rawls and Tina Turner, and promoted his version of "The Only Living Boy in New York", taking guest spots on the casino circuit in Los Angeles and San Francisco and appearing on Metro Media TV.

=== Record production ===
Pierson discovered there was an upside to the 1970 music ban that so harshly impacted local artists recording their own material. Australian acts could still cover versions of British hits that might otherwise be ignored.

To capitalise on that loophole he formed Chart Records which released a number of songs, including a cover by Sydney band, Autumn of Christie's "Yellow River", and their collaboration with Dave Allenby of Edison Lighthouse's "She Works in A Woman's Way", which both reached the top ten on the local music charts. Also achieving chart success was a re-release of his earlier single, "Love, Love, Love", which reached No. 38 on the Go-Set Australian National Charts in May 1970.

Concurrently Pierson became entertainment manager for John Harrigan's Sydney Bistros, which operated the largest nightclubs in Australia including Whiskey Au Go Go, Chequers and Stagecoach in Sydney. He booked Sammy Davis Jr, Frank Sinatra, Shirley Bassey, Trini Lopez and Dusty Springfield.

When interest in middle of the road artists began to recede, Pierson championed a move to bring rock and roll into the clubs. He stimulated the success of a new wave of bands including Lobby Loyde & the Coloured Balls, John Paul Young, Jeff St John, Blackfeather, Cold Chisel, Sebastian Hardie and Chain. He established new groups at Chequers including Sherbet who soon moved from house band to main drawcard.

In 1995, Gene Pierson and Village People’s drummer Allen Murphy visited Maningrida, an Australian Aboriginal community in Arnhem Land where they recorded indigenous talent such as the Sunrise Band, the Mimi Dancers, and the Letterstick Band. A limited edition compilation album was released on Pierson’s label Ocean Music that year. In January, 2016, the recording was remastered for the album “Demurru Hits”.

=== Booking agent ===
Pierson booked shows for AC/DC who were being promoted by Ray Arnold and his partner Alan Kissack. The band were booked into Chequers nightclub. however, venue management had never heard such a loud band and refused to have them back. Pierson booking them at various venues including the Bondi Lifesaver at 56 Ebley St. Bondi Junction.

He played a role in having Ted Albert of Albert Productions listen to AC/DC, who later signed with Albert Music. Pierson introduced the band to programme director of rock station 2SM, Rod Muir, who booked them for the station's school holiday concerts back at Chequers.

Pierson managed Johnny O'Keefe for a time, running a series of sell out rock and roll concerts at Paddington Town Hall which featured a range of guest artists including Ray Columbus, Johnny Devlin, Jade Hurley and Judy Stone.

During his time working with Sydney Bistros, Gene Pierson was introduced to British entrepreneur as an agent to rock bands including English band Black Sabbath, Don Arden, the father of Sharon Osbourne, who was at the time managing Electric Light Orchestra (ELO) and booking acts through Chequers nightclub. Ardern had heard the song Love and Other Bruises by Air Supply and wanted access to them. Pierson brokered a deal between Ardern and the band's management resulting in the band heading to US where they had strong chart success.

Around this time Pierson reconnected with members of his former band The Inturns who had engaged guitarist Mario Millo (ex-The Click) as the band's keyboard player and changed their name to Sebastian Hardie. He managed the symphonic rock unit and booked them to tour Australia with Dutch progrockers Focus. This helped the band achieve national exposure and led to the recording of the band's successful debut album, Four Moments in August 1975.

During this period Pierson had a regular showbiz column in the Sunday Mirror called "As It Is".

The most important rock festivals in Australia during the 1970s were the four Sunbury Festivals held in a natural amphitheater outside Melbourne. The organizer, Odessa Promotions, hired Gene Pierson to co-compare the 1974 Sunbury Festival. This was the year that Pierson introduced Britain's up-and-coming group Queen to a hostile audience who were chanting for Australian artists. Queen finished their set despite being booed.

=== Record labels ===
Pierson established his own agency called Blue Heaven, booking top Australian bands around Sydney pubs and clubs. He then merged this with a new publishing operation run out of Kerry Packer's Nine Network in Sydney. It was here that the Living Sound and Laser Records labels handled artists including Dark Tan, Geeza, Squeeze, Bobby Thomas, Trevor Knight, Julie Bower, Frankie Davidson, Australia and Southern Cross.

In the late-1970s he arranged a contract with established singer Judy Stone for concerts in Beijing resulting in strong record sales throughout mainland China. He also brokered a deal between INXS band manager Chris Murphy and Morrie Smith of RCA for international distribution.

Pierson produced and recorded all-girl group Peaches single, "Substitute", which peaked at number 15 on the Kent Music Report in 1978 on the Laser Records label.

Pierson purchased the rights for the Laser label and struck a distribution deal with Eldred Stebbing and Polygram Records. Pierson released the music of Th' Dudes and Hello Sailor in Australia through the Big Mouth label and launched their careers in Australia with an appearance at the opening of Sydney radio station 2WS.

Pierson produced two hit singles for singer Melissa Tkautz from the TV series E Street, released on his Laser Music label through Polygram. He had the single "Read My Lips" written for her by Roy Nicholson which became an Australian Recording Industry Association's dance hit, reaching No. 1 on the ARIA singles charts, selling 800,000 copies. The follow-up single, "Sexy (Is The Word)", also written by Nicholson reached No. 3 on the Australian charts.

Pierson was also behind the group Rhapsody, whose song, "Cowboy Lover", reached No. 95 on the ARIA singles charts in January 1993.

In 1995 Ladysmith Black Mambazo released their album Homeless in Australia on Pierson's Laser Music label in conjunction with distributor Dino Entertainment. The South African choral group rose to prominence after working with Paul Simon on his 1986 album, Graceland. Homeless went platinum, selling 80,000 copies after Pierson struck a deal with a national advertising company for one of the tracks, "Nomathemba", to be used in an advertisement for Nestlé's Nescafé Gold Blend.

In August 1996, following discussions with musician David Hudson, and his manager and wife, Cindy Hudson, Pierson formed the Indigenous Australia record label. The label specialises in Aboriginal, spoken word, world, ambient music and children's albums and has released over twenty albums for artists including Hudson, Tjapukai, Ash Dargan and guitarist Wayne Mcintosh, with over one million units sold globally. and fights to uphold the rights of indigenous musicians.

=== Comedy recordings ===
Early in the 1980s Pierson, was inspired to delve into the relatively untapped comedy market after meeting Englishman Roy Nicolson in 1982, who was the songwriter for Toto Coelo's "I Eat Cannibals", which reached No. 4 on the Australian singles charts and No. 2 on the New Zealand singles charts.

Nicolson had begun experimenting with animal sounds on an E-mu Emulator I, an early sampler. Pierson jokingly asked him if he could play "Paperback Writer" using dogs barking. He did and soon Pierson had commissioned him to create a parody album of popular Beatles songs with dogs plus a backing chorus of cows, sheep and chooks backed by anonymous backing musicians from Germany. The result was the 1983 novelty album, Beatle Barkers, credited to The Woofers and Tweeters Ensemble, released on the Passport Records label and marketed by Demtel.

Pierson subsequently arranged for live recordings of Australian comedy acts at the Margaret St Comedy Store in Sydney in conjunction with Barry Wayne. The first series, Australia Laughs, featuring George Smilovitch, Rodney Rude, Vince Sorrenti, Keith Scott, Garry Who, Calvin De Grey, and Graham Pugh, was released on video by Video Classics in 1984.

=== A Swag of Aussie Poetry ===
He recorded 53 of the best loved works of Australian prose and verses, entitled Out of the Bluegums – 150 Years of Australian Verse, which was released in 1985. It features 31 narrators delivering an eclectic mix of folk ballads and bush poetry from the 1800s through to 20th century prose. The narrators include Australian icons such as Peter Allen, Spike Milligan, Dame Joan Sutherland, and Dame Edna Everage. The double CD was digitally remastered and released on Pierson's Lifestyle Music label in January 2011 as A Swag of Aussie Poetry.

=== Unfinished business ===
In November 2007 Pierson was invited to perform at the Wild Things beat band event in Auckland, where he sang alongside Ray Columbus, The Pleazers, Chants R & b, The Breakaways, and Peter Nelson & the Castaways and the Underdogs.

In 2007 Pierson finally released his debut album, the 16-track compilation Spinning the Moments, which he had begun in 1968. A distribution deal was signed with Sony/BMG in Australia and EMI Music in New Zealand for the album.

In 2009, after 15 years with Indigenous Australia, Pierson merged the business into his Lifestyle Music Group making it easier to market the different styles of recording and artists he was working with and to expand into world music, sacred sounds, classical, poetry, ambient, jazz and health and lifestyle.

In its first year Lifestyle Music Group recorded 50 albums including mellow jazz café titles and "romance therapy" where he re-mastered older love songs, mixed with relaxing ocean sounds in-between.

In 2010 Lifestyle signed Australia's Got Talent finalist Cam Henderson. Pierson produced Henderson's debut single, "Angel Without Wings" as well as the album of the same name for the 44-year-old builder. The album, Angel Without Wings, reached No.29 on the Australian ARIA albums chart in October 2010.

In 2012 Pierson acquired the Peter Lik Publishing Group from renowned Australian photographer Peter Lik.

In June 2012 Pierson's Lifestyle Music label, distributed by Sony Music Entertainment, made music history by having the first Australian Dance Chart album "Don't Funk With Me" by Alston which peaked at No.16 on the Australian charts and No. 2 on the Australian dance music charts, spending a total of seven weeks in the charts.

In February 2013 he re-mastered and re-released Norman May's Great Moments in Australian Sports a history of Australian sporting moments starting from the first Melbourne Cup phantom call by Joe Brown in 1890.

In July 2014 he established Music Hive, a streaming music service for business environments. He continues to produce and record music tracks for his Lifestyle Music label distributed by Sony Music (SME).

In 2019, he and his wife Sharon appeared on the second season of the Australian Network Seven series Instant Hotel. He really struggles with paddle boarding as seen on Season 2, Episode 2.

== Discography ==
=== Albums ===
List of albums, with selected details
Title	Details
Spinning the Moments	Released: 2007; Format: CD; Label: Heritage Records (IA1967D)

=== Singles ===
List of singles, with selected chart positions
Title	Year	Peak chart positions
Title	Year	AUS
"Love, Love, Love"/"Celeste"	1966	—N/a
"You Got to Me"/"Rainy Day in June"	1967	—N/a
"Toyland"/"Matchstick in a Whirlpool"	1968	—N/a
"If You Only Loved Me"/"Just One Tender Look"	1968	—N/a
"I Ain't No Miracle Worker"/"Leaving on a Jet Plane"	1969	—N/a
"Reach Out"/"Oh Sweet Love"	1970	29
"See My Way"/"Teach Me How to Fly"	1970	—
"Love Love Love"	1970	87
"Story"/"Bye Bye Love"	1971	—
"Come on In"/"The Only Living Boy in New York"	1971	—
