= Galadriel (disambiguation) =

Galadriel is a major character in British author J. R. R. Tolkien's legendarium.

Galadriel may also refer to:

- Galadriel, a song by Barclay James Harvest from their 1971 album Once Again
- Galadriel Stineman, an American actress and model
- Galadriel Mirkwood, the name of immunologist Polly Matzinger's Afghan Hound
- Galadriel (Australian band), an Australian progressive rock band
- Galadriel (Slovak band), a Slovak gothic metal band
- Galadriel Hopkins, the protagonist of The Great Gilly Hopkins by American author Katherine Paterson
- "Galadriel's Lament in Lórien", a subtitle for the poem Namárië by J. R. R. Tolkien
