= The Vamps (Australian band) =

Australian musical group

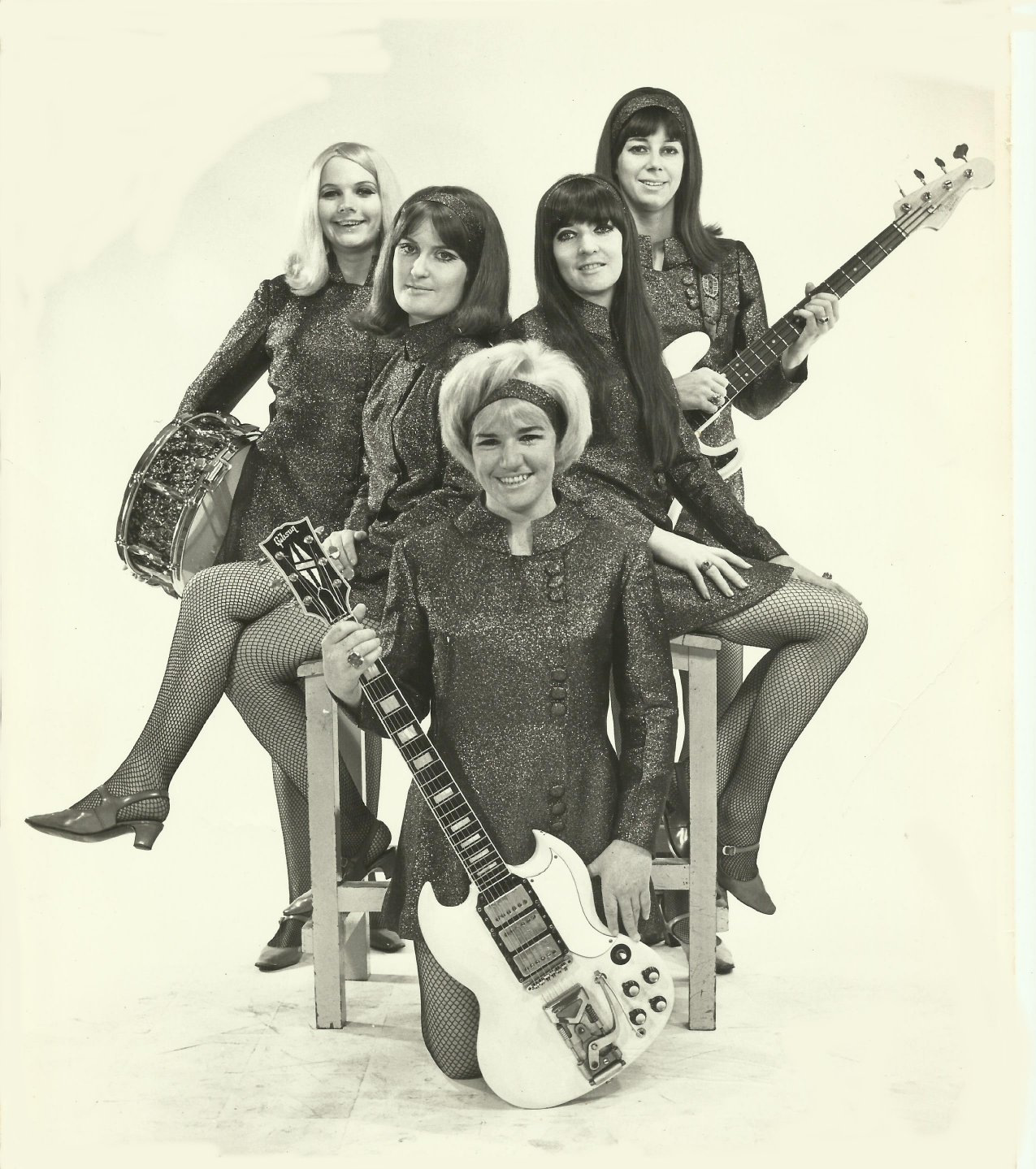

Background information
- Also known as: Jon and the Vamps; Jon and the Australian Vamps
- Origin: Australia
- Genres: Pop rock
- Years active: 1965–1977
- Spinoffs: Peaches
- Past members: Members
- Website: vampsoz.blogspot.com

The Vamps were an Australian all-female pop rock band formed in April 1965 by founding mainstay Margaret Britt on guitar. Between 1965 and 1969 they toured extensively in Australia, New Zealand, South East Asia and the Pacific Islands, including six months performing at military bases in South Vietnam during 1967–1968. In 1969 they relocated to the United States, and performed there through to early 1975, before returning to Australia. In 1977 the Vamps were renamed Peaches and played in Australasia and the Pacific until they disbanded in 1980. As from 2014 Britt performs with Skyz the Limit.

== History ==
=== Early career ===
In April 1965 Margaret Britt, following two years performing in New Zealand, decided to form an all-female pop rock group. In the previous year, recordings by the first all-female band of the pop era, Goldie and the Gingerbreads, had appeared, followed by the Pleasure Seekers, including a young Suzi Quatro. Britt initially put together a four-piece band with herself on guitar, joined by Kaye Gazzard, Judy Owen and Wendy Walton. They performed instrumentals, contemporary pop, and rock and roll songs. Their first gig was at Stomp City, AMOCO Centre, Orange in June 1965, where they drew a record crowd of 2030. Following this a fifth member – Janice Glading (stage name "Babs King") – was added on vocals.

The Vamps played the Millers Hotel circuit in Sydney and other venues through to the end of 1965. They appeared on Tonight with Don Lane, performing "Twist and Shout". In late 1965 Richard Neville of OZ magazine considered managing the band, instead he left for London early in 1966. In February of that year Britt assembled a new line-up, with Lisa-Kay James, Jan Little, Elaine Neilsen and Merlene Ryder. They toured eastern Australia, including the show ground circuit in Queensland. During September 1966 they were joined by Denise Cooper on vocals, following the departure of Neilsen. Whilst performing in Brisbane the Vamps appeared twice on the IN television show on BTQ7, performing "House of the Rising Sun" and "Hanky Panky".

=== Vietnam ===
The Vamps were offered to tour South Vietnam, consequently Britt organised a new line-up in May 1967 with Melbourne musicians Linda Cable, Marilyn Ockwell and Terri Scott. This line-up played a few gigs in Melbourne and Sydney before Britt replaced them in July with Denise Cooper, Val Falloon, Julie Hibberd and Carol Middlemiss. Falloon had recently arrived from England where she had written and produced a single, "The Time Is Over" (February 1966) for Mike Hamilton, via Decca Records. The Vamps toured South Vietnam between October 1967 and March 1968, performing at Australian, US, Korean and South Vietnamese military bases. They often drove themselves to gigs in an unescorted kombi van.

Venues included front line bases, Landing Zone (LZ) Ross, Da Nang, where in November 1967, during a performance on an open-air stage, they were subject to a mortar attack by the Viet Cong who were 200 yards away. The band cut short their set and were led into bunkers by the soldiers. They remained until they could be evacuated to safety. Whilst in Saigon, Britt was subjected to a sniper attack and in January 1968 the band were awarded a plaque by US forces for their courage and performance on the front line. During Viet Cong's Tet Offensive in late January 1968 there was concern in Australia over the safety of the band members, newspapers reported consular authorities locating the Vamps and their well-being. Band members Cooper, Hibberd and Middlemiss, feature in Mara Wallis' 2003 documentary Entertaining Vietnam, which deals with some of the lesser known touring bands, including the Vamps. Middlemiss described her experience, "The audiences were fabulous... We'd finish with the anthem that everyone was playing – 'We Gotta Get out of This Place'."

=== South East Asia and the Pacific ===
Whilst en route to Vietnam, in September 1967 the Vamps performed in Nouméa, French New Caledonia. Upon completion of their tour of military bases, in April 1968 they returned home to Australia via Singapore. Falloon left and was replaced by Joy Carroll. The band performed at east coast venues until September 1968. They undertook a six-month tour of Pacific islands and South East Asia which included gigs at Tahiti, Nouméa, Taiwan, Subic Bay Philippines, Bangkok in Thailand and Singapore. They returned to Australia in February 1969.

=== United States ===
The Vamps played in Sydney and Melbourne before leaving for the United States in May 1969 and stayed for six years. The four-piece initially consisted of Britt, Carroll, Hibberd and Middlemiss. Middlemiss departed in September and was replaced by American, Mary Kay Kuenzli. At the end of 1970 both Carroll and Kuenzli left and were replaced by the Petrak sisters, Cheryl and Micky. They performed at Tehachapi State Prison, California in February 1971. Shortly thereafter the Petraks left and Britt's husband Jon Kirk joined. They were renamed, Jon and the Australian Vamps, with the line-up of Britt, Kirk, Hibberd and American, Diane Smith. This four-piece worked until late 1971. Smith left and the group were joined by drummer, Nancy Kuminkovski. Smith rejoined and, following a brief visit to Australia in April 1972, both Hibberd and Smith left when they returned to the US. Britt and Kirk put together an eight-piece band. They were based in Green Bay, Wisconsin, and had gigs in Las Vegas, Birmingham, Nashville, St. Petersburg, Lake Tahoe and Hawaii. They performed in 38 States between 1969 and 1975 including at the Kentucky Derby and the Indianapolis 500.

== Recordings ==
In September 1971 Jon and the Australian Vamps recorded two 7" singles at Reflection Sound Studios, Charlotte, North Carolina for Jollie Ollie Productions, Kansas. The first single, "Bobby McGee" had Britt on vocals and "Are You Ready" had Kirk. The second single, "It's Too Late" had Hibberd on lead vocals and "Feeling Alright" had Kirk. Both were released in stereo by the Snyder Album Company and were intended for use by the US military forces.

== Peaches ==
In 1975 Britt and Kirk returned to Australia and performed throughout eastern Australia, including a gig in outback Birdsville. During 1977 Britt put together an all-female line-up of the Vamps. However, upon the recommendation of Gene Pierson of Laser Records, the Vamps were renamed, Peaches. They had a hit single with their cover version of the Righteous Brothers' "Substitute" (1978). The group were disbanded in 1980. As from 2014 Britt performs with Skyz the Limit.

== Members ==
- Margaret Britt – guitar
- Kaye Gazzard
- Judy Owen
- Wendy Walton
- Janice Glading ("Babs King") – vocals
- Lisa-Kay James
- Jan Little
- Elaine Nielsen – vocals
- Merlene Ryder
- Denise Cooper – vocals
- Linda Cable
- Marilyn Ockwell
- Terri Scott
- Julie Hibberd
- Carol Middlemiss
- Val Falloon
- Joy Carroll
- Jon Kirk
- Mary Kay Kuenzli
- Diane Smith
- Cheryl Petrak
- Micky Petrak
- Nancy Kuminkovski – drums
- Kelly Woodhouse
- Anita Azzopardi
