= Peaches (group) =

Australian musical group

- Origin: Sydney, New South Wales Australia
- Genres: Pop
- Years active: 1977–1980
- Label: Laser
- Past members: Margaret Kirk (lead vocals, guitar); Huck (drums); Trop (bass); The Nun (keyboards)

Peaches were an Australian pop music girl group who were active in the late 1970s with Margaret Kirk on lead vocals and guitar (a.k.a. Margaret Britt, ex-The Vamps) and Sue Kirkby (ex Daughters of Zeus) on bass guitar. They were championed by record producer, Gene Pierson, who referred to them as Australia's first all-female pop band.

Their highest-charting single was a cover version of the Righteous Brothers' "Substitute", which peaked at number 15 on the Australian Kent Music Report singles chart. The song had been a worldwide hit for the all female South African group, Clout in 1977.

In 2011, Pierson reflected “I think the timing was absolutely perfect. There were so many boy bands around then.” Peter Hood, then owner and head engineer of Atlantic Records, said Peaches had potential to be world-class stars. “They were really very good. Margaret, the lead singer, was world-class; she was better than Suzi Quatro. We thought they would be a world-wide hit.”

== Discography ==
=== Singles ===
Title	Year	Peak chart positions	Catalogue
Title	Year	AUS	Catalogue
"Substitute"/"Keep On Dancin'"	1978	15	103178
"Long Long Week-End"/"Time Won't Make It Better"	1978	-	103257
"You've Got All of Me"/"Oh Me Oh My Goodbye"	1979	-	103379
