= Revamp =

Revamp may refer to:

== Changes ==
- Revamp, informal term for maintenance, repair, and operations
- Revamp, informal term for editing of natural-language text

== Music ==
- ReVamp, a progressive metal band founded by Floor Jansen, after the split up of After Forever, her former band
  - ReVamp (album), the self-titled debut album from the band above
- Revamp, a tribute album to Elton John and Bernie Taupin

== See also ==
- Revamped, a 2023 remix album by Demi Lovato
- Vamp (disambiguation)
- Re (disambiguation)
