= A Swag of Aussie Poetry =

- Original vinyl double album, released in 1984

Studio album by Various
- Released: 1984; 2 August 2010
- Recorded: 1984
- Genre: Spoken Word/Poetry
- Length: 104:42
- Label: J&B Records; Lifestyle Music
- Producer: Gene Pierson

A Swag of Aussie Poetry, originally Out of the Bluegums (150 Years of Australian Verse), is a mid-1980s recording project with celebrity voices reciting or singing Australian poetry. The compilation consists of 53 works of prose and verse from writers across Australia's literary landscape, and features 31 narrators delivering a mix of folk ballads and bush poetry from the 1800s through to 20th century prose, and lyrical songs reflecting on life in their country. It was released originally as a double album and a double cassette on J&B Records in 1984 with 50 tracks. The compilation was produced by Gene Pierson – born as Giancarlo Salvestrin.

In 2010 the material was digitally re-mastered as a 2-CD set on the Lifestyle Music label which was released on 2 August 2010. Pierson lamented the death of many contributing artists since the original album, "the fact this compilation has been re-mastered 25 years after they made their contributions means this is not only a memorial to our great poets but to those people who bought their words alive again for listeners in the 21st century". The cover art was by Australian outback painter, Pro Hart. In Australia it appeared in September the following year. The CD cover art is by Jenny Glaze and is based on The Swagman, circa 1908.

== Poets and writers ==
Nancy (Nan) May McDonald, Douglas Stewart, Kate Llewellyn, A.D. Hope, Ronald McCuaig, R.F. Brissenden, Spike Milligan, P.J. Hartigan (John O’Brien), Dame Mary Gilmore, Jack Moses, Judith Wright, Les Murray, Henry Kendall, Mary Durack-Miller, Norman Lindsay, Vivian Smith, David Campbell, Henry Lawson, James McAuley, Rhyll McMaster, A.B. (Banjo) Paterson, R.D. Fitzgerald, Peter Lawson, Kenneth Slessor, John Blight, Dorothea Mackellar, Victor Daley, Ray Mathew, Kath Walker, Kenneth Mackenzie, Alwyn Lee, Alisha Salvestrin, Ron Jones, Peter Allen, Charles Perkins and Dame Edna Everage.

== Narrators ==
Barry Humphries, Spike Milligan, Dame Joan Sutherland, Bobby Limb, Ron Jones, John Meillon, Bert Newton, Dame Edna Everage, Rolf Harris, Sir Robert Helpmann, Ita Buttrose, Peter Allen, Thomas Keneally, John Newcombe, Judy Stone, Smoky Dawson, Terry Willesee, John Waters, Dawn Lake, Judy Morris, Diane Cilento, Simon Townsend, Eddie Charlton, Charles Perkins, Dawn Fraser, Rowena Wallace, Michael Edgley, Peter Lawson, Ron Haddrick, Rev. Roger Bush and Alisha Salvestrin.

== Track listing ==
CD 1
No.	Title	Writer(s)	Narrator/performer	Length
1.	"The Convict and the Lady"	James McAuley	Ron Haddrick	3:02
2.	"Trees"	Dorothea Mackellar	Dawn Lake	1:01
3.	"Ben Hartigan"	Mary Durack-Miller	Rolf Harris	6:00
4.	"Profiles of My Father"	Rhyll McMaster	Diane Cilento	1:58
5.	"Waratah & Wattle"	Henry Lawson	Robert Helpmann	1:47
6.	"Candles"	Nan McDonald	Judy Morris	3:27
7.	"The Silkworms"	Douglas Stewart	John Meillon	1:42
8.	"Windy Gap"	David Campbell	Eddie Charlton	0:58
9.	"My Wife’s Second Husband"	Henry Lawson	Peter Lawson	2:00
10.	"Heritage"	Mary Gilmore	Bobby Limb	1:16
11.	"No More Boomerang"	traditional	Charles Perkins	1:50
12.	"Friendship & Love"	Kenneth MacKenzie	Ita Buttrose	2:04
13.	"I Still Call Australia Home" (spoken)	Peter Allen	Peter Allen	1:31
14.	"Nationality"	Mary Gilmore	Joan Sutherland	0:39
15.	"Separation"	Henry Lawson	Roger Bush	1:22
16.	"The Company of Lovers"	Judith Wright	Rowena Wallace	1:11
17.	"An Absolutely Ordinary Rainbow"	Les Murray	Thomas Keneally	3:09
18.	"Bellbirds"	Henry Kendall	Judy Stone	2:38
19.	"The Man from Snowy River"	Banjo Paterson	John Newcombe	5:56
20.	"The Wild Colonial Boy"	traditional	Smoky Dawson	2:53
21.	"Our Love is so Natural"	Judith Wright	Dawn Fraser	1:09
22.	"The Magic Pudding"	Norman Lindsay	Simon Townsend	2:39
23.	"Family Album"	Vivian Smith	Judy Morris	1:12
24.	"Letter from Garella Bay"	R. F. Brissenden	John Meillon	1:55
25.	"Orchid in My Glass" / "A Poem for the Lonely" / "Wasp" / "Woodworm"		Spike Milligan	1:17
26.	"The Chocolate Soldier"		Ron Jones	4:00
Total length:				58:36

CD 2
No.	Title	Writer(s)	Narrator/performer	Length
1.	"The Last of His Tribe"	Henry Kendall	John Waters	2:19
2.	"A Round Song"	Rhyll McMaster	Diane Cilento	1:07
3.	"Said Hanrahan"	John O'Brien	Terry Willesee	3:03
4.	"Nurse no Long Grief"	Mary Gilmore	Joan Sutherland	0:34
5.	"Nine Miles from Gundagai"	Jack Moses	Bobby Limb	1:56
6.	"Death of a Whale"	John Blight	Simon Townsend	3:27
7.	"My Country"	Dorothea Mackellar	Bert Newton	1:58
8.	"Dreams"	Victor Daley	Dawn Lake	1:41
9.	"Young Man's Fancy"	Ray Mathew	Eddie Charlton	1:11
10.	"The Dispossessed"	Kath Walker	Charles Perkins	1:26
11.	"Imperial Adam"	A. D. Hope	Thomas Keneally	2:38
12.	"Love Me and Never Leave Me"	Ronald McCuaig	Ita Buttrose	1:04
13.	"Eve"	Kate Llewellyn	Ita Buttrose	0:56
14.	"Country Towns"	Kenneth Slessor	Smoky Dawson	1:21
15.	"The Southern Cross"	Alwyn Lee	Barry Humphries	1:20
16.	"Edna’s Ode to Silver"	Barry Humphries	Edna Everage	1:50
17.	"Beach Burial"	Kenneth Slessor	John Waters	1:14
18.	"An Aboriginal Smile"	Mary Gilmore	Dawn Fraser	0:28
19.	"Johnny Walker"	Mary Durack-Miller	Rolf Harris	6:09
20.	"We Are Going"	Kath Walker	Rowena Wallace	1:57
21.	"Clancy of the Overflow"	Banjo Paterson	Michael Edgley	2:05
22.	"Woman to Man"	Judith Wright	Judy Morris	1:20
23.	"This Night's Orbit"	R. D. Fitzgerald	Joan Sutherland	1:30
24.	"Until You're Home Again"	Peter Lawson	Peter Lawson	1:35
25.	"Polarities"	Kenneth Slessor	Ron Haddrick	1:26
26.	"A Prayer for the Nuclear Age"	Les Murray	Roger Bush	1:23
27.	"The Way I See The World"	Alisha Salvestrin	Alisha Salvestrin	1:40
Total length:				46:06
