= Demtel =

Demtel International
- Industry: Marketing and Distribution
- Founded: 1985
- Founder: David Hammer; Warwick Doughty
- Defunct: May 11, 2001
- Fate: Dissolved
- Headquarters: Sydney, Australia
- Key people: Michael Milne (CEO); Tim Shaw (presenter)
- Products: Consumer goods
- Parent: International Media Management Holdings Ltd.

Demtel International (commonly shortened to Demtel) was an Australian home shopping and marketing company best known for television informercials during the 1990s. The name Demtel was a portmanteau of "demonstration television". As well as launching the media career of presenter Tim Shaw, Demtel's ubiquitous presence on commercial television during its peak saw the name as well as various marketing tactics and slogans used by the company being adopted as tropes in Australian vernacular.

== History ==
Demtel International was first registered as an Australian company in 1985, founded by Warwick Doughty and David Hammer, who had formerly worked with the local subsidiary of international marketing company K-tel. During the early 1980s, the Demtel name had been used to market a catalogue of compilation albums, working with artists including Gene Pierson and minor record companies. Pierson was encouraged by David Hammer to come up with "something really crazy", resulting in the 1983 album Beatle Barkers. On the back of Demtel's television marketing campaign the novelty album, consisting of tracks by The Beatles performed by an ensemble of dogs, sold 860,000 copies.

In 1988, the Department of Business and Consumer Affairs took Demtel International to court over misleading advertisements that misrepresented plastic costume jewellery as genuine, valuable items. The company, which sold more than 70,000 units of the stock was fined $12,000. Despite this, the company recorded sales of $6.9 million in 1989–90, a figure which grew to $19.6 million in 1992–93 even as the nation endured an economic recession.

Between 1992 and 1995, Tim Shaw presented Demtel's infomercials, which received as much as 23 minutes of air-time per day. Demtel had seen the success of Ron Popeil's infomercials in the United States that used phrases like "But wait, there's more!" to great effect. In Shaw, they had an Australian to become the face of the company and deliver the same lines. This proved to be highly effective, driving sales of over 1,000,000 steak knives and 600,000 compact discs during his time with the company, while Shaw himself gained national fame and recognition as "the Demtel man". In 1994 it was reported the company spent around $10 million per year on TV advertising.

In July 1993, Demtel was sold by Hammer and Doughty to International Media Management (IMM), an ASX listed company with intentions of developing it into a stand-alone cable TV home shopping network. Within a year of sale, reports emerged of late payments to creditors by Demtel and legal disputes with the previous owners, causing IMM's share price to plummet. Amid ongoing legal disputes between IMM and the former owners relating to royalties and commissions, Shaw parted ways with Demtel in 1995. He was replaced by veteran talk-show host Don Lane. Shaw revealed in 2019 that despite the company's success during his time as their spokesman, he received only $200 from Demtel for each informercial he appeared in.

In November 1995, IMM launched The Value Channel on the Galaxy subscription television service, with Lane signed to host some of the programming. With IMM now focussing on this venture, Demtel's popularity waned in the late 1990s, competing with the rise of online services and emergence of dedicated home shopping networks. The company was wound down and liquidated in 2001.

An investigation by the Australian Federal Police into IMM's Chief Executive Officer Michael Milne would result in his conviction for tax fraud and money laundering in 2008. These charges related to a 13-year period, including falsifying his personal tax returns while in charge of Demtel. In November 2010, he was sentenced to four years and nine months in prison.

== Products and marketing ==
Demtel's business model involved purchasing bulk quantities of products, which it marketed by a telephone-order home shopping service, directly handling distribution from a central warehouse via regular post. Products were sold with a "no questions asked, money back guarantee", and were often bundled to create extra value and urgency. A common offer involved the inclusion of six free steak knives if the customer called within 15 minutes of the infomercial airing on television.

Products marketed by Demtel included kitchen knives, compact disc collections, pocket cameras, run-free pantyhose and other kitchen utensils. The infomercials themselves were usually between one and two minutes and included demonstrations of the product. Demtel's model was effective at creating consumer demand, but this left it vulnerable to competition from discount retailers who could stock the same products. This allowed discount retailers to quickly respond by undercutting Demtel's prices in store and making products immediately available to customers.

== Cultural impact ==
=== Politics ===
Use of "Demtel", often in a disparaging way became a popular trope in Australian politics. Usually, this is a reference to empty spin or election sweeteners. Demtel references occur in political commentary and analysis as well as in parliament itself, with many examples including:

- In 2010, Premier of Queensland Anna Bligh referred to the opposition Liberal National Party's website as providing "No policies, 4,000 shopping items, and every one of them at a Demtel discount,"
- Canberra Times cartoonist Geoff Pryor depicted Prime Minister Paul Keating as "the Demtel man" during 1995, a reference to perceived pork barrelling and broken election promises.
- Senator Joe Ludwig in 2006 likened a government bill to a marketing trick, offering to "...sell you a Demtel square plastic box with nothing in it as well."
- In a 1998 immigration debate, Pauline Hanson told the House of Representatives "We have enough unemployment without multinationals bringing in foreign workers. But as the Demtel man says, But wait, there's more."

=== Sports ===
In Australian rules football, the term "steak knives" is sometimes used to describe a deal sweetener, particularly in relation to player drafts. This is a direct reference to Demtel's promotional offer of free steak knives to incentivise a deal. A player may be referred to as a "steak knife" if they are included as part of a trade between players of higher value, such as in the case of Collingwood's Jack Crisp.
