= Galadriel (Australian band) =

- Origin: Sydney, New South Wales, Australia
- Genres: Progressive rock
- Years active: 1969–1972
- Labels: Polydor; Vicious Sloth
- Past members: Garry Adams; Doug Bligh; Gary Lothian; Mick Parker; Jon "Spider" Scholtens; Dave Allen; Bruce Belbin

Galadriel were an Australian progressive rock group formed in 1969 by Garry Adams on guitar and vocals, Doug Bligh on drums (both ex-House of Bricks), Gary Lothian on lead guitar (ex-Elliot Gordon Union), Mick Parker on bass guitar and flute (ex-Samael Lilith), and Jon "Spider" Scholtens on lead vocals. According to Australian musicologist, Ian McFarlane, their debut self-titled album from May 1971 is, "one of the rarest major label progressive rock albums of the early 1970s... songs ranged in style from bluesy hard rock ('Amble On', 'Girl of Seventeen') to jazzy ballads ('Standing in the Rain')." The group broke up in 1972. Galadriel was re-released in 1995, on CD, by Vicious Sloth Collectables.

== History ==
Future members of Galadriel, Garry Adams on guitar and vocals and Doug Bligh on drums, had both been members of Sydney dance band, House of Bricks, alongside Daryl Braithwaite on lead vocals and Bruce Worrall on bass guitar. Mick Parker, on bass guitar and flute, was a member of Samael Lilith with Ray Ferguson on lead vocals and guitar, Brent Thurlow on organ and Greg Wilder on drums. When Galadriel formed in 1969 and House of Bricks disbanded, Braithwaite and Worrall joined Samael Lilith before the pair later joined pop group, Sherbet. Galadriel's original members with Adams, Bligh and Parker were Gary Lothian on lead guitar (ex-Elliot Gordon Union), and Jon "Spider" Scholtens on lead vocals; the main song writers were Adams and Scholtens.

The group were named for the Elven character in J. R. R. Tolkien's The Lord of the Rings. Their debut single, "Girl of Seventeen", was issued via the Du Monde label in February 1971. They were signed to Polydor Records, which issued the group's self-titled album in May of that year. It was recorded with Tom Lubin producing. Ian McFarlane, an Australian music journalist, observed, "[it is] one of the rarest major label progressive rock albums of the early 1970s... songs ranged in style from bluesy hard rock ('Amble On', 'Girl of Seventeen') to jazzy ballads ('Standing in the Rain')." A second single, "Standing in the Rain", appeared alongside the album in the same month. Parker left the group and was replaced by Dave Allen on flute and Bruce Belbin on bass guitar. The group had signed a recording contract with Festival Records but broke up in 1972. Adams and Bligh joined Mario Millo in the Clik, Bligh later played in Richard Clapton Band, Ross Ryan Band and then Windchase (the latter group with Millo). Galadriel was re-released in 1995, on CD, by Vicious Sloth Collectables.

== Members ==
- Garry Adams – guitar, vocals 1969–1972)
- Doug Bligh – drums 1969–1972)
- Gary Lothian – lead guitar 1969–1972)
- Mick Parker – bass guitar, flute 1969–1971)
- Jon "Spider" Scholtens – lead vocals 1969–1972)
- Dave Allen – flute 1971–1972)
- Bruce Belbin – bass guitar 1971–1972)

== Discography ==
=== Albums ===
- Galadriel (May 1971) – Polydor (2907 001)

=== Singles ===
- "Girl of Seventeen" (1971) – Du Monde
- "Standing in the Rain" (1971) – Polydor
