= Vamp =

Vamp most commonly refers to:

- Vamp (shoe), the upper part of a shoe
- Vamp (woman), a seductress or femme fatale; derived from "vampire"
- Vamp (music), a repeating musical figure or accompaniment

Vamp or vamps may also refer to:

== Science and technology ==
- Value Added Information Medical Products (VAMP), former name of the General Practice Research Database
- Vesicle-associated membrane protein, a family of proteins
- The VAMP regimen, a chemotherapy regimen for the treatment of low-risk childhood Hodgkin lymphoma
- Project Vamp, a U.S. Navy hydrologic survey
- V.A.M.P. (G.I. Joe), a toy vehicle

=== Vehicles ===
- Venus Atmospheric Maneuverable Platform (VAMP), an inflatable robotic aircraft for Venus
- VaMP, the first autonomous car that drove long distances in traffic
- "Vamps", short for De Havilland Vampire plane in Rhodesia

== Music ==
- Vamp (band), Norwegian folk music band formed in 1990
- Vamps (band), Japanese rock band formed in 2008
  - Vamps (album), the 2009 self-titled debut album of the Japanese band
- The Vamps (Australian band), formed in 1965
- The Vamps (British band), a band formed in 2012
- DJ Yung Vamp (born 1995), a Belgian DJ and record producer
- Vamp (album), a 1996 album by Akina Nakamori
- Vamp (Magnolia Park album), 2025

== Characters ==
- Vamp (comics), a character in the Marvel series Captain America and Deadpool
- Vamp (Gobots), a character from Gobots
- Vamp, a character in the Metal Gear series
- Elsie "Vamp", a main character in the comic series Fangs

== Film, television and theatre ==
- Vamp (film), 1986 vampire film
- Vamps (film), 2012 horror-comedy film
- Vamp (TV series), a Brazilian telenovela
- The Vamp, a 1955 musical comedy
- The Vamp (film), a lost 1918 silent film wartime comedy-drama
- Theda Bara (1885–1955), American silent film actress nicknamed "The Vamp"
- Ivana Vamp, Italian drag queen

== Other ==
- Vamp (firefighter), a slang term for a volunteer firefighter in the United States
- Vamp Creek, a river in Manitoba, Canada
- Vamp Building, a building in Lynn, Massachusetts, U.S.
- Seattle Vamps, a women's ice hockey team
- Vamp!, a light novel series by Ryōgo Narita
- Vamps (comics), a limited comic book series by Elaine Lee and William Simpson

== See also ==
- Vampire (disambiguation)
- Vampirella, a fictional character
