= Beatle Barkers =

Studio album by Woofers & Tweeters Ensemble
- Released: 1983
- Length: 29:25
- Label: Passport Records

Beatle Barkers is a 1983 album released by the Woofers & Tweeters Ensemble on the Passport Records label. The album consists of dogs barking a parody of popular Beatles songs. The guitar and other instrumental tracks, performed by anonymous backing musicians from Germany, are very similar to the original Beatles recordings, with the animal sounds taking the place of the sung lyrics.

== Production ==
The album was a collaboration between engineer Roy Nicolson and producer Gene Pierson. Nicolson had begun experimenting with animal sounds on an E-mu Emulator I, an early sampler. Pierson jokingly asked him if he could play "Paperback Writer" using dogs barking. He did and soon Pierson had commissioned him to create the album, which was made in about two weeks on an 8-track tape machine, with two tracks for the backing tracks and six for the animals, which included not only dogs but also sheep, farmyard fowls and a cat. All the animal sounds were sampled from real animals except for the howling dogs which were recorded by a dog impersonator. The album was released on Passport Records and marketed by Demtel. American soul singer Swamp Dogg has previously claimed to have sung on this album, but he admitted in a 2015 interview that he was only involved in its sales outside Australia, particularly in the US.

== Reception ==
In 1984, Sally Cragin of The Boston Phoenix wrote that the album was "a real howler".

== Track listing ==
All songs written by Lennon/McCartney.

1. "I Wanna Hold Your Hand"
2. "Love Me Do"
3. "Ob La Di Ob La Da"
4. "We Can Work It Out"
5. "I Saw Her Standing There"
6. "I Feel Fine"
7. "Can't Buy Me Love"
8. "All My Loving"
9. "Day Tripper"
10. "She Loves You"
11. "A Hard Day's Night"
12. "Paperback Writer"
