= Rhapsody (musical group) =

Australian musical duo

Rhapsody was an Australian female duo that consisted of Kymberlie Harrison and Cathy Ford. They had a minor hit (No. 95 on the ARIA singles chart) in the early 1990s called "Cowboy Lover" on BMG Records.

After the promoter and record label owner Gene Pierson's success with the soap opera actor Melissa Tkautz, who had a No. 1 hit in 1991 as Melissa, he came up with the concept for Rhapsody. He styled the two models and helped them create the song that gave them success.

"Cowboy Lover" was originally a slow reggae song, but was remixed into a dance track by Filthy Lucre, famous for their 1991 dance remixes of Yothu Yindi's "Treaty".

Prior to Rhapsody, Kymberlie Harrison was a producer for Melissa's hits "Read My Lips" and "(Sexy) Is the Word", written by Roy Lachlan Nicolson.

At the height of their popularity the duo posed in Playboy Australia magazine, making the cover of the August 1993 edition.

== Discography ==
=== Singles ===
List of singles, with selected chart positions
Title	Year	Peak chart positions
Title	Year	AUS
"Cowboy Lover"	1993	95
