= Tim Shaw (comedian) =

American comedian

Tim Shaw is an American stand up comedian and voice over actor from Orange County, Calif. He won the 2008 Orange County’s Funniest Person Contest and was nominated as the Leukemia & Lymphoma Society’s 2009 Man of the Year for his charitable work. In addition to these honors, he won 2nd Place in the 2008 Funniest Comic in Los Angeles Contest at the Hollywood Improv and is a finalist in the 2009 Funniest Comic in Los Angeles Contest. He also won 3rd Place in the 2006 Funniest Comic in the San Fernando Valley Contest. He has been featured in the Orange County Register and OC Post newspapers and appeared as a special guest on KOCE’s Real Orange and Inside OC TV shows. Other television and radio appearances include The DAMage Report Radio Show. He regularly features and headlines in clubs and private shows all over Southern California. His latest voice over project is “Voices of a Never Ending Dawn,, a historical documentary debuting on May 23, 2009 in Detroit, Michigan.
