= Tim Shaw (salesperson) =

- Born: Tim Shaw
- Occupations: Television presenter Radio Announcer; Actor; Journalist; Author; Businessman
- Known for: Demtel ads
- Website: www.timshaw.com.au

Tim Shaw is an Australian radio and television presenter, actor, journalist, author and businessman. He has hosted the 2CC the #TimShawBreakfastShow a Canberra talk radio program from 2016 to 2019. He has been a director of the National Press Club Board since November 2017 and a member of the Federal Parliamentary Press Gallery.

== Career ==
=== Television ===
Shaw spent 2013–2015 as Thailand Correspondent for news and current affairs for Seven Network Australia. He has appeared on Seven's Today Tonight and Nine Network's A Current Affair and on all commercial TV networks as an expert on sales and marketing. He has produced various TV and radio campaigns for clients nationally and internationally. Shaw has appeared as a panelist on TV debates as a social commentator.

During his tenure in Thailand he appeared on Phuket News TV as a commentator and as a reporter on issues affecting Australians travelling in SE Asia. He hosted afternoon radio on Phuket's Live 89.5 FM radio and produced and presented the Phuket News Hour program dedicated to news and current affairs in the ASEAN region.

=== Commercial spokesperson ===
Shaw became best known to Australian TV audiences as "The Demtel Man" between 1992 and 1995 as he presented as the face of an infomercial "As Seen on TV" sales company TV commercials and infomercials for Demtel International. He popularised the expression "But wait, there's more" in Australia. He was well known for offering a free set of steak knives to anyone who placed an order within a set timeframe, even when the main product for sale had nothing to do with steak knives, so much so that "steak knives" has remained a common Australian slang term for a small or irrelevant sweetener within a larger deal long after Demtel's demise.

Since then he has also appeared in many TV commercials for McDonald's and Pizza Hut restaurants, presented radio shows on Sydney radio stations 2GB and 2UE, and written a best-selling book called Best Seller – Tim Shaw's Sales Success Secrets.

From late 1999 until December 2001, Shaw was a board member of the road service mutual NRMA where he recorded the fourth highest vote in the Mutual's history in the 1998 demutualisation election as a member of the Members First team led by Nicholas Whitlam.

=== Radio ===
Shaw has hosted the 2CC Breakfast radio in Australia's national capital, Canberra. He has previously hosted Legal Matters on Sydney radio station 2UE and network stations, along with the Australia overnight program 2010–2013. He hosted the Tim Shaw Weekend morning program 1998–2000 on Sydney Radio 2GB.

== Awards ==
Shaw was awarded a star on Caloundra's "Walk of Stars" in 2006. He won Best Current Affairs presenter 2017 and Best Talk Presenter 2019 at the Australian Commercial Radio Awards. He was a finalist in 2016 and 2018 also in those categories.

== Personal life ==
Shaw was educated at Cromer Public School & the Pittwater House Schools on the Northern Beaches, Sydney, Australia. He attended Macquarie University and studied Media & Cultural Studies 1998–2000.
