= Clout (band) =

South African rock group

- Origin: Johannesburg, South Africa
- Genre: Rock
- Years active: 1977–1981; 2018–19
- Past members: Cindy Alter; Ilene Tomlinson; Ingrid Brough; Glenda Hyam; Jenni Garson; Ron Brettell; Sandy Robbie; Gary van Zyl; Connie Bentlage; Alastair Coakley

Clout was a South African rock group formed in Johannesburg in 1977, best known for their hit single, "Substitute". Originally all-female, the group later included some male musicians, who had played as session musicians on "Substitute".

== Career ==
Clout's first and biggest hit, "Substitute", was a new arrangement of a Righteous Brothers song, composed by Willie Wilson. In 1978, their version reached No. 1 in South Africa, New Zealand and Germany, and reached the top 10 in other countries. It also reached No. 2 on the UK Singles Chart and remained in the UK charts for 15 weeks. Due to sanctions against South African artists and performers by UK's Equity at the time, the BBC One television series Top of the Pops used the group's performance of the song on Dutch programme TopPop, from 8 April 1978, to present the hit song for its Top 10 countdown. Clout's cover of "Substitute" reached No. 67 on the U.S. Billboard Hot 100.

Clout scored one more Top 10 single, "Save Me", and two further top 20 hits, "Under Fire" and "You've Got All Of Me".

Clout split up in 1981, shortly after the release of their last major single, a re-arrangement of the Hall and Oates song "Portable Radio". The previous single "Oowatanite" was also a cover, the original being a hit by the Canadian group April Wine.

In 1992, their greatest hits package was released on CD, and it was re-mastered as The Best of Clout in 2010.

In 2005 a reunion CD was recorded, titled Since We've Been Gone. A number of their classic hits were re-recorded, including "Substitute", but most of the tracks were new songs written by Clout. The line up was: Cindy Alter, Ingi Brough, Glenda Miller (Hyam), Jenni Garson, Sandy Robbie, George Vardas, Gary Van Zyl, Denholm Harding and Hylton Brooker.

In 2018, the band had a brief reunion to celebrate the 40th anniversary of their hit single "Substitute". The line-up consisted of Cindy Alter, Ingi Herbst Brough, Glenda Hyam, Gary van Zyl, Connie Bentlage (on saxophones), and Alastair Coakley. In 2020, Cindy Alter, Ingi Herbst Brough, Jenni Garson, and Glenda Hyam had a brief virtual reunion with a performance of "Substitute", edited by Verny Scholtz.

== Musicians ==
- Cindy Alter (born in Johannesburg, South Africa): lead vocals, guitar (1977–1981, 2018–2019)
- Ilene "Lee" Tomlinson: bass, vocals (1977–1980)
- Ingrid "Ingi" Brough (née Herbst): drums, vocals (1977–1981, 2018–2019)
- Glenda Hyam: keyboards, guitar, vocals (1977, 2018)
- Jenni Garson: guitar, vocals (1977–1981)
- Ron "Bones" Brettell: keyboards, vocals (1978–1981)
- Sandy Robbie: guitar, vocals (1978–1981)
- Gary van Zyl: bass (1980–1981, 2018–2019)
- Connie Bentlage: saxophone (2018–2019 (reunion tour))
- Alastair Coakley: guitar (2018–2019 (reunion tour))

== Discography ==
=== Albums ===
- 1978: Substitute (aka Clout)
- 1979: Six of the Best
- 1980: A Threat and a Promise
- 1981: 1977 to 1981 (compilation with one new song)
- 1992: Substitute (Dutch compilation)
- 1992: 20 Greatest Hits (compilation)
- 1994: Clout (German compilation)
- 2007: Since We've Been Gone (compilation with nine new recordings)
- 2010: The Best of Clout (compilation)

=== Singles ===
Year	Single	Peak chart positions											
Year	Single	AUT	BE (FLA)	DEN	IRE	GER	NL	NZ	SA	SWI	UK	US	ZIM
1977	"Substitute"	10	2	9	1	1	2	1	1	2	2	67	1
1978	"Since You've Been Gone"	—	—	—	—	—	—	—	—	—	—	—	—
1978	"You've Got All of Me"	25	—	—	—	14	17	—	16	—	—	—	14
1979	"Let It Grow"	—	—	—	—	—	—	33	—	—	—	—	—
1979	"Save Me"	14	5	5	—	4	6	—	7	4	—	—	1
1979	"Under Fire"	—	18	6	—	15	26	—	19	7	—	—	18
1979	"Oowatanite"	—	—	8	—	33	—	—	—	—	—	—	—
1980	"Portable Radio"	—	—	7	—	54	—	—	—	—	—	—	—
1980	"The Best of Me"	—	—	—	—	73	—	—	—	—	—	—	—
1981	"Wish I Were Loving You"	—	—	—	—	—	—	—	—	—	—	—	—
"—" denotes releases that did not chart or were not released
