= Four Moments =

Studio album by Sebastian Hardie
- Released: August 1975
- Recorded: EMI studios, Sydney, Australia
- Genres: Rock, progressive rock, symphonic rock
- Length: 39:48
- Label: Polydor/Mercury
- Producer: Jon English

Sebastian Hardie chronology
Four Moments (1975)	Windchase (1976)

Singles from Four Moments
- 1. "Rosanna" Released: August 1975

Four Moments is the debut studio album by the Australian symphonic rock band Sebastian Hardie and was released in August 1975 by Polydor Records. It was their most commercially successful release. The single from the album was the instrumental "Rosanna", which peaked at #55 on the National singles chart. The title track takes up side one of the original vinyl LP release and is a suite of four parts. All tracks were written by lead vocalist / lead guitarist Mario Millo either on his own or with fellow band members Toivo Pilt, Alex Plavsic and Peter Plavsic. The distinctive logo, which would feature on future Sebastian Hardie releases, was designed by Larraine Hall (see infobox at right). The album was produced by former band member Jon English.

== Details ==
Four Moments features dramatic arrangements, seamlessly flowing with its impeccable musicianship displaying influences of European progressive rock bands Genesis, King Crimson, Focus and Yes. Millo, in a 2002 interview, reflected on the creation of the album:

"I began conceiving the various melodic phrases over a period of time and became excited by the idea of writing and ultimately performing an orchestral style piece. I knew I was on to something special and I wanted the world hear it. Sebastian Hardie was the perfect band for this [...] At rehearsals we then took the ideas and began to assemble them, it wasn't long before we were ready to perform what was to become the 'Four Moments' album."

— Mario Millo, 2002-05-21

According to Millo: "Glories Shall Be Released" was partly inspired by a boyhood friend's drug experiences - his distorted sense of reality and subsequent suicide, "Rosanna" was named for Millo's older sister who was an emotional support, and "Openings" evolved from the band's jamming.

== Reception ==
The Australian said, "Australians were resistant to prog rock and never really took to Mario Millo's brilliant bands – Sebastian Hardie and, later, Windchase. The outstanding Four Moments (produced by Jon English) and its symphonic instrumental highlight, "Rosanna", scraped the charts and disappeared."

At the 1975 Australian Record Awards, the album won Best Australian-Designed Cover.

== Track listing ==
Songwriters according to Australasian Performing Right Association (APRA).

1. "Four Moments" (Mario Millo, Toivo Pilt, Alex Plavsic, Peter Plavsic) – 20:41
  1. "Glories Shall Be Released" (Millo) – 6:42
  2. "Dawn of Our Sun" (Millo) – 5:05
  3. "Journey Through Our Dreams" (Pilt, A. Plavsic, P. Plavsic, Millo) – 6:43
  4. "Everything is Real" (Millo) – 2:11
2. "Rosanna" (Millo) – 6:02
3. "Openings" (Millo, Pilt, A. Plavsic, P. Plavsic) – 13:03
4. "Day After Day" (Millo) – 5:18 (Bonus track on Japanese CD Release Avalon MICY-1115 1999)

== Personnel ==
Sebastian Hardie members

- Mario Millo – vocals, lead guitar, mandolin
- Toivo Pilt – keyboards (Hammond organ, piano, Mellotron, Moog)
- Peter Plavsic – bass guitar
- Alex Plavsic – drums, percussion

Additional musicians

- Greg Bushell – congas, bells, tambourine
- Bob Payne – tambourine on "Journey Through Our Dreams"

Recording details

- Arranger: Sebastian Hardie
- Producer: Jon English
- Recording and mixing engineer: Richard Lush at EMI Studios, Sydney

Art work

- Symbol design: Larraine Hall
- Photography: David Miller

== Charts ==
Chart (1975)	Peak position
Australia (Kent Music Report)	12

== Certifications ==
Region	Certification	Certified units/sales
Australia (ARIA)	Gold	20,000^{^}
^{^} Shipments figures based on certification alone.
