= Galadriel (Slovak band) =

Slovak metal band

Galadriel' is a Slovak metal band. Formed in 1995, the music is described as gothic, dark or doom metal.

== Reception ==
Outside of Slovakia, Galadriel mainly became known for their outputs From Ashes & Dust (2002) and World Under World (2004). They were the band's first releases on Metal Age Productions, which saw some distribution abroad. Norway's Scream Magazine called From Ashes & Dust "dark-hued semi-doom variant of metal with gothic elements", reminding of My Dying Bride and Paradise Lost, while the band also managed to attain some originality. The violin was put to good use, but not the keyboards. The score was 4 out of 6. Inspiration from Blind Guardian was pointed out as well, with but From Ashes & Dust "fails completely" and "falls flat" in its endeavours, according to Vampster. Powermetal.de saw the male vocals as a considerable drawback: "No matter how beautifully the instrumentalists construct melodic and harmonic structures or get the blood pumping with upped riffing speeds, Dodo manages with 80% certainty to completely obliterate any grace the songs might possess with his harsh growls". At best, the vocals were "somewhat acceptable". The female vocals were "pleasant, ethereal" but "a bit too shy and timid". Overall, the band possessed skills, rendering the album not "completely bad". Metal.de only gave it 5 out of 10 points.

World Under World came in 2004. For Vampster's reviewer, this was a "refreshing surprise" with a variety of elements "seamlessly blended" in. "With a bit more courage to embrace their own style, they could really go far". Powermetal.de called this an "overall good" album, but with elements that "might not appeal to every listener". Metal.de gave a slightly improved rating, 6 out of 10, but Rock Hard stayed on 5.

== Discography ==
- Empire of Emptiness (1997)
- The Mirror of Ages (1999)
- Oblivion (2000)
- From Ashes & Dust (2002)
- World Under World (2004)
- Empty Mirrors of Oblivion (compilation, 2005)
- Renascence of Ancient Spirit (2007)
- The 7th Queen Enthroned (2012)
- Lost in the Ryhope Wood (EP, 2015)
