= Sebastian Hardie =

Australian progressive rock band

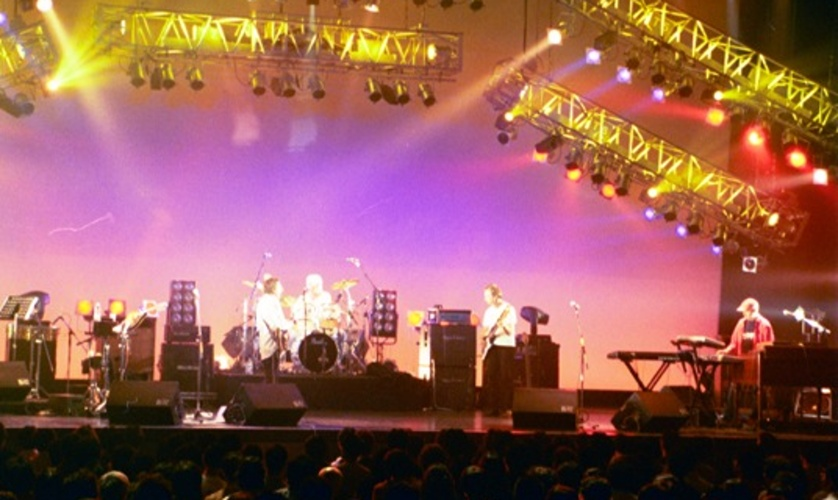
- Live in Japan, 2003. L to r, Mario Millo, Alex Plavsic, Peter Plavsic, and Toivo Pilt

Background information
- Also known as: Sebastian Hardie Blues Band; Windchase
- Origin: Sydney, New South Wales, Australia
- Genres: Rock, progressive rock, Latin rock, symphonic rock, rhythm and blues
- Years active: 1967–1977, 1994, 2003, 2011–present
- Labels: Polydor, Avalon, Mercury, Festival, Infinity
- Past members: see Members list below

Sebastian Hardie are an Australian symphonic rock band. They formed in Sydney in 1967 as Sebastian Hardie Blues Band but dropped the 'Blues Band' reference when they became pop-oriented. By 1973 they developed a more progressive rock style, and later performed as Windchase, but disbanded in 1977. An early member of Sebastian Hardie was Jon English (vocals, rhythm guitar), who starred as Judas Iscariot in the Australian version of the stage musical Jesus Christ Superstar in 1972 and subsequently had a solo career as a singer, actor and playwright. A later member, Mario Millo (lead guitar, mandolin, vocals) became a multi-award winner for his television and movie music. They are the first symphonic rock band to come from the country.

Sebastian Hardie's other early members included Graham Ford (lead guitar), Anatole Kononewsky (keyboards), Peter Plavsic (bass guitar) and his brother Alex Plavsic (drums). After English, Kononewsky and Ford had left, the Plavsic brothers were joined by Millo and Toivo Pilt (keyboards). With their addition, Sebastian Hardie developed extended progressive rock tracks to become a symphonic rock group before they released their definitive album Four Moments in 1975, which peaked at No. 12 on the National albums chart. They followed with a second album Windchase in 1976, but it had less chart success. Millo and Pilt formed the band, Windchase, to release Symphinity in 1977, it was a heavier jazz-fusion album but didn't have chart success and they disbanded.

== History ==
=== 1967–1973: Early years ===
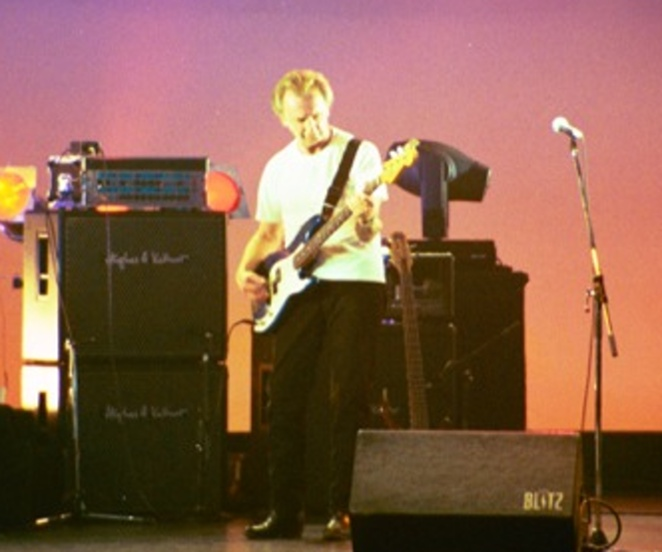
Peter Plavsic plays bass with Sebastian Hardie in 2003

Guitarist Graham Ford (ex-The Interns) made up the name 'Sebastian Hardie' when he founded Sebastian Hardie Blues Band in 1967 in Sydney. Variable line-ups included John Bellamy (bass guitar), Dennis Laughlin (vocals, later in Sherbet), Richard Lillico (ex-The Interns, drums), Syd Richmond (drums), Dave Waddington (vocals) and Neil Williamson (organ). They played R&B and soul covers but disbanded in early 1968. When Ford reformed the band later in the year, he recruited students from Sydney's Cabramatta High School, Jon English on vocals and rhythm guitar, Anatole Kononewsky on keyboard, Peter Plavsic (ex-The Interns) on bass guitar, and his brother Alex Plavsic on drums. They dropped the 'Blues Band' part to play more pop-oriented music and were the backing band for legendary Australian rocker Johnny O'Keefe during 1969. Covering songs from Rolling Stones, The Beatles, Otis Redding and Wilson Pickett they built a reputation in the Sydney pub scene. Late in 1971, English left Sebastian Hardie when he won the role of Judas Iscariot in the Australian stage production of Jesus Christ Superstar from May 1972. He was eventually replaced by Steve Dunne on vocals and keyboards. British singer Larry Page produced Sebastian Hardie's first single "All Right Now" in September 1973 on RCA Records.

=== 1973–1977: Four Moments and Windchase ===
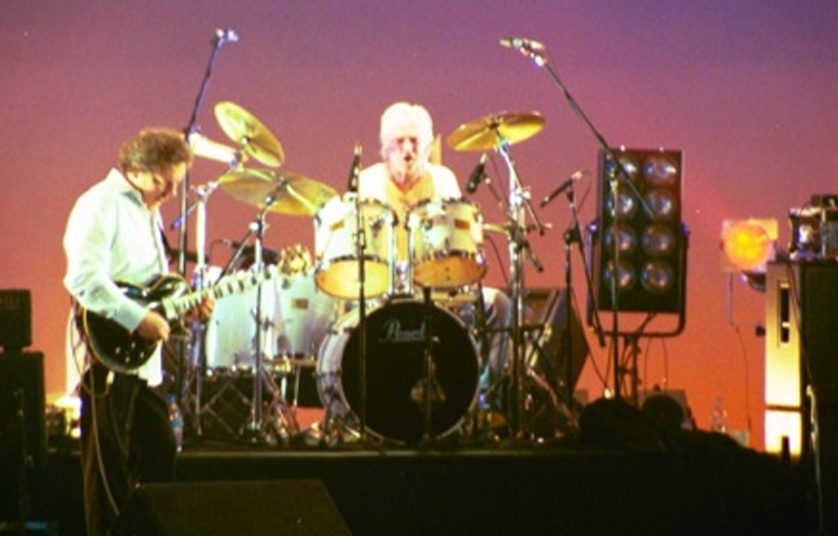
Mario Millo (guitar) and Alex Plavsic (drums) performing with Sebastian Hardie in 2003

Ford left Sebastian Hardie by October 1973 to be replaced by Mario Millo on lead guitar. They recorded a second single "Day After Day" released in April 1974. By this time Tovio Pilt had replaced Dunne on keyboards and Millo took over on vocals. Besides covers they were playing original progressive rock material. They were Australia's first symphonic rock band and performed a 20-minute version of Mike Oldfield's Tubular Bells as part of their set; Millo was now writing more orchestrated and inventive original material. After signing to Polydor Records they supported tours by international acts Lou Reed and Osibisa during 1974. Their first LP, Four Moments, which peaked at No. 12 on the Australian Kent Music Report Albums Chart, was released in August 1975. Produced by former member Jon English, it achieved Gold status – selling 35,000 copies, while the related single "Rosanna", an instrumental track, peaked at No. 55 on the Kent Music Report Singles Chart. Four Moments showed the influence of progressive rock groups from Europe, including Genesis, Yes, King Crimson and Focus. It contained only three tracks with the title track taking up one side; Sebastian Hardie displayed "seamless, dramatic arrangements and impeccable musicianship".

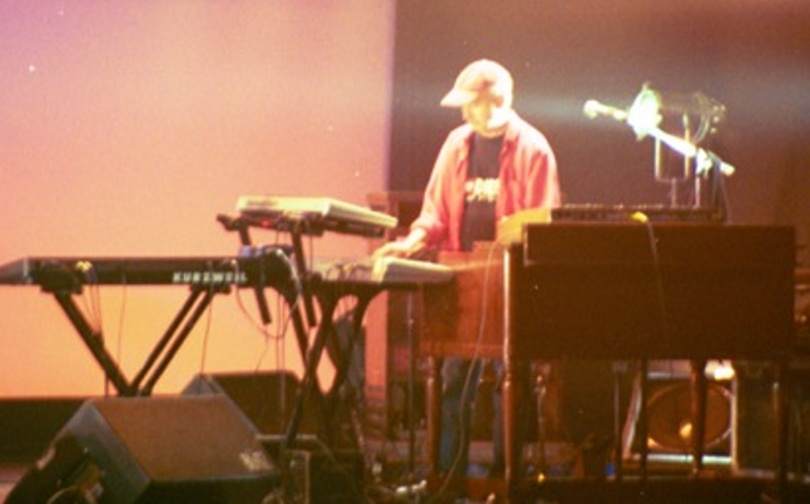
Toivo Pilt playing keyboards with Sebastian Hardie in 2003

Windchase, their second album, was released in February 1976, then they supported the national tour by Santana and released a single "Life, Love and Music", but neither album nor single had any Top 50 chart success. In June, management and internal disagreements led to the Plavsic brothers leaving and an ensuing court decision awarded the band name to Peter Plavsic; consequently Millo and Pilt combined under the name Windchase. They added Doug Nethercote (bass guitar) and Doug Bligh (drums) for the new rhythm section. The Plavsic brothers became backing musicians for The Studs, a Rock n Roll revival group. Windchase played Sebastian Hardie's material which had been written by Millo and by 1977 started recording Symphinity, which was more jazz-fusion oriented. During album sessions, Nethercote left to be replaced by Duncan McGuire (bass guitar, ex-Doug Parkinson in Focus, Ayers Rock). When the album was released in June, McGuire and Bligh were replaced by Nethercote's return and new member Ralph Cooper (drums). Singles from the album were "Glad to Be Alive" in May and "Flight Call" in October, but neither album nor singles had any chart success. Windchase toured through to October 1977 but the emerging punk and new wave music forms resulted in poor concert audiences and Windchase disbanded.

=== After the separation ===
Ford was a member of Sydney-based band, Pleasure Master in 1986 on guitar and vocals. Millo worked with Jon English on the 1978 TV series Against the Wind soundtrack, and the associated single "Six Ribbons" peaked at No. 8 on the national charts; both the album and its title track were translated as "Mot Alla Vindar" and peaked at No. 1 on the Norwegian albums and singles charts respectively. Millo also released solo albums Epic III in November 1979, Human Games in March 1983 and Oceans of the Mind in 2002. He became better known through his television and movie soundtrack production winning six industry awards for work in The Lighthorsemen (1987), G.P. (1989), Brides of Christ (1991, two awards), See How They Run (1999) and Changi (2001). Original soundtracks released include Against the Wind (1978, with Jon English), World Safari II (1984), A Fortunate Life (1986), The Lighthorsemen (1989) and Brides of Christ (1991). Sebastian Hardie briefly reformed in 1994 – with the Plavsic brothers, Millo and Pilt – to perform at a progressive rock festival, ProgFest, in Los Angeles, which was recorded and eventually released as Sebastian Hardie – Live in L.A. in 1997. They played material from Four Moments, Windchase, Symphinity, and Epic III. At the Gimme Ted benefit concert on 10 March 2001 Sebastian Hardie performed "Openings" and then backed former member, Jon English, for two of his songs. Another reunion occurred in 2003 when supporting the British art rock band, Yes on their Australian tour.

Pilt played keyboards for Ross Ryan during 1979–1983. Since 2004 he recorded CDs with Sydney "progressive chill" band Tramtracks, with Robert Forbes (keyboards, theremin), Mark Hudson on guitar (who had worked with James Reyne before Australian Crawl) and Graeme James on drums.

Kononewsky continued to compose music during most of his life, just for the love of it. In 1989, he wrote the song, "What if the World Turned Around" for the launch of a documentary introduced by John Denver. In 1993, Kononewsky composed the song, “See What we Can Be”, a recording produced with Jerry Speiser, drummer from the group Men at Work, for the launch of a second documentary. In 1994, Kononewsky wrote the musical score for a third documentary, based on the musical rendition of the poem, Spiritual Song of the Aborigine by Hyllus Maris. (Kononewsky also created the three documentaries.)

In 2011 Sebastian Hardie released a new album, Blueprint, through their website.

In 2017 Kononewsky co-wrote the song, 'Heart of Australia' with multi-platinum award winning songwriters and producers Barbara Hannan and Adrian Hannan. It was performed by Tarryn Stokes, released on 26 October 2022. He also digitally released his album 'Only love matters: music for Soft Diamond Light' in 2022.

In 2025 Kononewsky was profiled on Triple J Unearthed, which featured a new song, 'A Love that Whispers'. The song was officially released, digitally on 17th November 2025 to celebrate the 150th Anniversary of the Theosophical Society. It also featured the 'Heart of Australia' and a track from his album, 'move 1 Sounds like the start of something different'.

== Members ==
Sebastian Hardie Blues Band (1967–1968)

- Dennis Laughlin – vocals (1967–1968)
- Dave Waddington – vocals (1967–1968)
- Graham Ford – lead guitar (1967–1973)
- Neil Williamson – organ (1967–1968)
- John Bellamy – bass guitar (1967–1968)
- Richard Lillico – drums (1967–1968)
- Syd Richmond – drums (1967–1968)

Sebastian Hardie (1968–1976)

- Jon English – vocals, rhythm guitar (1968–1971), producer (1975)
- Graham Ford – lead guitar (1967–1973)
- Anatole Kononewsky – keyboards (1968–1972)
- Mario Millo – vocals, lead guitar, mandolin (1973–1977)
- Steve Dunne – vocals, keyboards (1972–1974)
- Toivo Pilt – keyboards (Hammond C3 L-111 organ, grand piano, Mellotron; Minimoog & Solina String Ensemble synthesizers) vocals (1974–1977)
- Peter Plavsic – bass guitar (1968–1976)
- Doug Nethercote – bass guitar (1976–1977)
- Alex Plavsic – drums, percussion (1968–1976)

Windchase (1976–1977)

- Mario Millo – vocals, lead guitar (1973–1977)
- Toivo Pilt – keyboards (Hammond C3 L-111 organ, grand piano, Fender Rhodes electric piano, Hohner Clavinet D6, Mellotron; Minimoog, ARP 2600, Solina String Ensemble & ARP Omni string synthesizers), guitar, vocals (1974–1977)
- Doug Nethercote – bass guitar (1976–1977)
- Duncan McGuire – bass guitar (1977)
- Doug Bligh – drums (1976–1977)
- Ralph Cooper – drums (1977)

== Discography ==
=== Albums ===
List of albums, with Australian chart positions
Title	Album details	Peak chart positions	Certification
Title	Album details	AUS	Certification
Four Moments	Released: 1975; Format: LP, Cassette; Label: Polydor (2907 016)	23	AUS: Gold
Windchase	Released: 1976; Format: LP, Cassette; Label: Polydor (2907 024)	66	
Symphinity (As Windchase)	Released: 1976; Format: LP, Cassette; Label: Infinity (L 36216)	43	
Rock Legends	Released: 1980; Format: LP, Cassette; Label: Polydor (2475 651); Compilation album	-	
Four Moments of the Windchase	Released: 1990; Format: CD, Cassette; Label: Mercury (846 902-2); Compilation album	-	
Live in L.A.	Released: 1997; Format: CD; Label: Musea; Recorded in 1994	-	
Blueprint	Released: 2011; Format: CD; Label: Blueprint	-	

=== Charting singles ===
Year	Title	Peak chart positions
Year	Title	AUS
1975	"Rosanna"	55
1976	"Life, Love and Music"	95

== Awards ==
=== Australian Record Awards ===
Year	Nominee / work	Award	Result
1975	Sebastian Hardie for Four Moments	Best Australian-Designed Cover	Won
