= Substitute (The Righteous Brothers song) =

Single by Clout

from the album Substitute
- B-side: "When Will You Be Mine"
- Released: November 1977 (SA): June 1978
- Length: 3:28
- Label: Sunshine Records Production
- Songwriter: Willie Harry Wilson
- Producer: Grahame Beggs

Clout singles chronology
"Since You've Been Gone" (1977)	"Substitute" (1977)	"You've Got All of Me" (1978)

Official audio
- "Substitute" at TopPop on YouTube

"Substitute" is a song by Willie H. Wilson, recorded first by the Righteous Brothers and released as a single from their album The Sons of Mrs. Righteous in 1975. A 1978 version by the South African all-female band Clout was a global hit.

== Clout version ==
In 1978, the song became a big hit for the South African band Clout, reaching No. 2 in the UK charts in August and being certified Gold by the BPI. It fared even better in the rest of Europe, Africa and Oceania where it reached No. 1 in Germany, Ireland, New Zealand and South Africa, as well as No. 2 in Belgium, the Netherlands and Switzerland. It fared exceptionally well on the annual charts too, reaching the Top 20 on the final year-end singles charts in the Netherlands, New Zealand, South Africa, Switzerland and the UK. This version was produced by Grahame Beggs.

=== Track listing ===
1. "Substitute" (W.H. Wilson) – 3:28
2. "When Will You Be Mine" (Carolyne Martin) – 2:59

=== Charts ===
==== Weekly charts ====
Chart (1978)	Peak position
Australia (Kent Music Report)	12
Austria (Ö3 Austria Top 40)	10
Belgium (Ultratop 50 Flanders)	2
Canada Top Singles (RPM)	86
France (IFOP)	16
Ireland (IRMA)	1
Netherlands (Dutch Top 40)	2
Netherlands (Single Top 100)	2
New Zealand (Recorded Music NZ)	1
South Africa (Springbok Radio)	1
Sweden (Sverigetopplistan)	13
Switzerland (Schweizer Hitparade)	2
UK Singles (Official Charts)	2
US Billboard Hot 100	67
US Billboard Adult Contemporary	35
US Cash Box	52
West Germany (GfK)	1

==== Year-end charts ====
Chart (1978)	Rank
Australia (Kent Music Report)	77
Belgium (Ultratop 50 Flanders)	22
Netherlands (Single Top 100)	13
New Zealand (Recorded Music NZ)	15
South Africa (Springbok Radio)	2
Switzerland (Schweizer Hitparade)	11
UK Singles (OCC)	2
West Germany (Official German Charts)	38

=== Sales and certifications ===
Region	Certification	Certified units/sales
Belgium	—	60,000
France	—	400,000
Netherlands	—	100,000
United Kingdom (BPI)	Gold	600,000

== Other versions ==
- Australian group Peaches also charted locally at the same time, peaking at number 15 on the Australian chart.
- Gloria Gaynor in 1978 (U.S. #107) and by Polish-Swedish singer and actor Izabella Scorupco in 1990.
