= List of Stars in Their Eyes episodes =

The following is a list of Stars in Their Eyes episodes from the British talent show, which originally aired on television network ITV from 1990 to 2006, and was briefly revived in 2015.

== Episode list ==
Colour key:

Indicates that the contestant won the episode and qualified for the grand final
Indicates the "wildcard" contestant that series
Indicates the winning contestant or series champion (1st)
Indicates the runner-up contestant (2nd)

== 1990 ==
=== Series 1 ===
Episode 1 (21 July 1990)

Order	Contestant	From	Appeared as	Performing
1	Kelly Hampson	Merseyside	Kylie Minogue	"Never Too Late"
2	Gary Gibson	Preston	John Lennon of The Beatles	"Twist and Shout"
3	Maxine Barrie	Westhoughton	Shirley Bassey	"Goldfinger"
4	Michael Bostock	Crewe	Roger Whittaker	"Durham Town (The Leavin')"
5	Ian Duncan		Frank Sinatra	"The Lady Is a Tramp"

Episode 2 (28 July 1990)

Order	Contestant	From	Appeared as	Performing
1	Jackie McFall		Madonna	"Papa Don't Preach"
2	Joe Robinson		Roy Orbison	"Oh, Pretty Woman"
3	Laine Kennedy		Barbra Streisand	"Woman in Love"
4	James Del Giudice		George Michael	"Faith"
5	Chris Higgins		Chris De Burgh	"The Lady in Red"

Episode 3 (4 August 1990)

Order	Contestant	From	Appeared as	Performing
1	Yvonne Haylen		Cher	"If I Could Turn Back Time"
2	Derek Kerrigan		Paul McCartney of The Beatles	"Yesterday"
3	Glenn Carroll		Neil Sedaka	"Breaking Up Is Hard to Do"
4	Marie Lloyd		Edith Piaf	"Non, je ne regrette rien"
5	Sam Soreno		Tom Jones	"Kiss"

Episode 4 (11 August 1990)

Order	Contestant	From	Appeared as	Performing
1	Cora Weeks		Whitney Houston	"I Wanna Dance with Somebody (Who Loves Me)"
2	Jean-Marie Steel		Nana Mouskouri	"Only Love"
3	Thomas Canning		Neil Diamond	"Love on The Rocks"
4	John Ensall		Marti Pellow of Wet Wet Wet	"Angel Eyes (Home and Away)"
5	Gary and Darren Simmons		The Bee Gees	"Night Fever"

Episode 5 (18 August 1990)

Order	Contestant	From	Appeared as	Performing
1	Carole Anne Barrie		Alison Moyet	"All Cried Out"
2	Jeff Smith		Johnny Mathis	"Misty"
3	Jimmy Jermaine		Cliff Richard	"I Just Don't Have the Heart"
4	Nancy Heaton		Eartha Kitt	"Just an Old Fashioned Girl"
5	Keith Ivett		Barry Manilow	"It's A Miracle"

==== Grand Final (25 August 1990) ====
Order	Grand Finalist	Winner of Episode	Appeared as	Performing
1	Sam Soreno	3 (4 August 1990)	Tom Jones	"Delilah"
2	John Ensall	4 (11 August 1990)	Marti Pellow	"Sweet Surrender"
3	Maxine Barrie	1 (21 July 1990)	Shirley Bassey	"Something"
4	Chris Higgins	2 (28 July 1990)	Chris De Burgh	"Missing You"
5	Jimmy Jermaine	5 (18 August 1990)	Cliff Richard	"Wired for Sound"

== 1991 ==
=== Series 2 ===
Episode 1 (8 June 1991)

Order	Contestant	From	Appeared as	Performing
1	Carmel Hunter	London	Tina Turner	"What's Love Got To Do With It"
2	Mike Nelson	Northampton	Bryan Ferry of Roxy Music	"Dance Away"
3	Bernard Wenton	Liverpool	Nat King Cole	"Ballerina"
4	Amanda Brown	Bridgend	Olivia Newton-John	"Hopelessly Devoted to You" from Grease
5	David Luke	Prestatyn	Mick Jagger of The Rolling Stones	"Jumpin' Jack Flash"

Episode 2 (15 June 1991)

Order	Contestant	From	Appeared as	Performing
1	Julie Key		Janet Jackson	"Rhythm Nation"
2	Marc Robinson		Buddy Holly	"Rave On!"
3	Alison Conway		Jennifer Rush	"The Power of Love"
4	Joe Baron		Bing Crosby	"True Love"
5	David Jones		George Michael	"Careless Whisper"

Episode 3 (22 June 1991)

Order	Contestant	From	Appeared as	Performing
1	Kevin Snell		Tony Hadley of Spandau Ballet	"Gold"
2	Susan Brooks		Elkie Brooks	"Don't Cry Out Loud"
3	Ricky Wangongo		Louis Armstrong	"What a Wonderful World"
4	Samantha Groves		Karen Carpenter of The Carpenters	"Superstar"
5	Dieter Graham		Elton John	"I'm Still Standing"

Episode 4 (29 June 1991)

Order	Contestant	From	Appeared as	Performing
1	Jack Danson		Rod Stewart	"Maggie May"
2	Paul Adams		Engelbert Humperdinck	"Release Me"
3	Jeanette Richmond		Judy Garland	"The Trolley Song"
4	Bill Marquis		Dean Martin	"Everybody Loves Somebody"
5	Debbie Carter		Sheena Easton	"Modern Girl"

Episode 5 (6 July 1991)

Order	Contestant	From	Appeared as	Performing
1	Samantha Herd		Gloria Estefan	"1–2–3"
2	Richard Monroe		Johnny Mathis	"I'm Stone in Love with You"
3	Darren Alboni		Mick Hucknall of Simply Red	"Holding Back the Years"
4	Geri Smith		Vera Lynn	"We'll Meet Again"
5	Paul Feldon		Marc Bolan of T. Rex	"Hot Love"

==== Grand Final (13 July 1991) ====
- With special guest Maxine Barrie as Shirley Bassey performing "This is My Life"

Order	Grand Finalist	Winner of Episode...	Appeared as	Performing
1	Ricky Wangongo	3 (22 June 1991)	Louis Armstrong	"Hello, Dolly!"
2	Darren Alboni	5 (6 July 1991)	Mick Hucknall	"If You Don't Know Me By Now"
3	Alison Conway	2 (15 June 1991)	Jennifer Rush	"Ring of Ice"
4	Bernard Wenton	1 (8 June 1991)	Nat King Cole	"When I Fall in Love"
5	Jeanette Richmond	4 (29 June 1991)	Judy Garland	"Get Happy"

Christmas Special (28 December 1991)

Order	Former contestant	Who appeared on series...	Appeared as	Performing
1	Sam Soreno	1 (1990)	Tom Jones	"It's Not Unusual"
2	Ian Duncan and Jeanette Richmond	Ian: 1 (1990) and Jeanette: 2 (1991)	Frank Sinatra and Judy Garland	"Let's Do It, Let's Fall in Love"
3	Jimmy Jemaine	1 (1990)	Cliff Richard	"Miss You Nights"
4	Carmel Hunter, Jack Danson, Julie Key, Dieter Graham, Jackie McFall, David Luke	Carmel: 2 (1991), Jack: 2 (1991), Julie: 2 (1991), Dieter: 2 (1991), Jackie: 1 (1990) and David: 2 (1991)	Tina Turner, Rod Stewart, Janet Jackson, Elton John, Madonna and Mick Jagger	Dancing in the Street
5	Gary Gibson and Derek Kerrigan	1 (1990)	John Lennon and Paul McCartney	She Loves You
6	Bernard Wenton	2 (1991)	Nat King Cole	Let There Be Love
7	Maxine Barrie, Bernard Wenton,	1 & 2 (1990 & 1991)	Shirley Bassey, Nat King Cole,	Do They Know It's Christmas?

== 1992 ==
=== Series 3 ===
Episode 1 (22 February 1992)

Order	Contestant	From	Appeared as	Performing
1	Catherine Nevin	London	Madonna	"Express Yourself"
2	Bernard Jones	Cardiff	Frank Ifield	"I Remember You"
3	Peter Jackson	Manchester	David Bowie	"Let's Dance"
4	Sharon Woodward	Leamington Spa	Cilla Black	"You're My World"
5	Peter Elliott	Walsall	Stevie Wonder	"I Just Called to Say I Love You"

Episode 2 (29 February 1992)

Order	Contestant	From	Appeared as	Performing
1	Mitchell Bowyer	Essex	Sting of The Police	"Message In A Bottle"
2	Nick Miller		Gerry Marsden of Gerry and the Pacemakers	"I Like It"
3	Jacky Webbe	Cardiff	Diana Ross of The Supremes	"When You Tell Me That You Love Me"
4	Karen Iwancz		Chrissie Hynde of The Pretenders	"Brass in Pocket"
5	Frank Roche	Newcastle	Gary Glitter	"I'm the Leader of the Gang (I Am)"

Episode 3 (7 March 1992)

Order	Contestant	From	Appeared as	Performing
1	Paula Colwell	Aberdeen	Cher	"The Shoop Shoop Song (It's in His Kiss)"
2	Paul Salvage	Bristol	Bobby Hatfield of The Righteous Brothers	"Unchained Melody"
3	Barry Mortimer	Trafford	Gilbert O'Sullivan	"Matrimony"
4	William Robertson	Perth	Jason Donovan	"Any Dream Will Do" from Joseph and the Amazing Technicolor Dreamcoat
5	Gail Fraser	Kent	Cathy Dennis	"Touch Me (All Night Long)"

Episode 4 (14 March 1992)

Order	Contestant	From	Appeared as	Performing
1	Sue Gene	East London	Olivia Newton-John	"Physical"
2	Stephen Ross		Leo Sayer	"One Man Band"
3	Troy Musson	Germany	Andy Bell of Erasure	"A Little Respect"
4	Amanda Normansell	Bargoed	Patsy Cline	"Crazy"
5	Billy Brown	Widnes	Errol Brown of Hot Chocolate	"You Sexy Thing"

Episode 5 (21 March 1992)

Order	Contestant	From	Appeared as	Performing
1	Samantha Milne	Scotland	Lisa Stansfield	"All Around The World"
2	Bob Hinton		Jim Reeves	"He'll Have to Go"
3	Paul McCafferty	Stoke-on-Trent	Bryan Adams	"(Everything I Do) I Do It for You"
4	Gillian White	Tranent	Stevie Nicks of Fleetwood Mac	"Dreams"
5	Paul Anderson	Tottenham	MC Hammer	"U Can't Touch This"

==== Grand Final (28 March 1992) ====
- With special guest Bernard Wenton as Nat King Cole performing "Unforgettable"

Order	Grand Finalist	Winner of Episode...	Appeared as	Performing
1	Jacky Webbe	2 (29 February 1992)	Diana Ross	"Chain Reaction"
2	Amanda Normansell	4 (14 March 1992)	Patsy Cline	"Sweet Dreams"
3	Paul McCafferty	5 (21 March 1992)	Bryan Adams	"Run to You"
4	Paul Salvage	3 (7 March 1992)	Bobby Hadfield	"Ebb Tide"
5	Peter Elliott	1 (22 February 1992)	Stevie Wonder	"You Are the Sunshine of My Life"

== 1993 ==
=== Elvis Special (2 January 1993) ===
Order	Elvis impersonator	Performed...
1	Roy Bateman	"That's All Right"
2	Tom Alston	"Jailhouse Rock"
3	Roy Bateman and Tom Alston	"Hound Dog" and "(Let Me Be Your) Teddy Bear"
4	Joe Feighery	"One Night"
5	Roy Bateman, Tom Alston and Joe Feighery	"Blue Suede Shoes"
6	Steve Halliday	"You Gave Me a Mountain"
7	Adam Carter, Bill Swindlehurst and Trevor Evans	"G.I. Blues, Wooden Heart and King Creole"
8	John Prescott	"Guitar Man"
9	Heath Ashton	"In the Ghetto"
10	Paul Thorpe	"I Just Can't Help Believing"
11	Chris Clayton	"The Wonder of You"

=== Series 4 ===
Episode 1 (22 May 1993)

Order	Contestant	From	Appeared as	Performing
1	David Smith	Stoke-on-Trent	Michael Jackson	"Thriller"
2	Brian Farrell	Liverpool	Joe Cocker	"With a Little Help from My Friends"
3	Joanna Leyton	Wrexham	Beverley Craven	"Promise Me"
4	Sharon Terri	Wirral	Cyndi Lauper	"Girls Just Want to Have Fun"
5	Gary Ryan	Bolton	Neil Diamond	"Forever in Blue Jeans"

Episode 2 (29 May 1993)

Order	Contestant	From	Appeared as	Performing
1	Joanna Carter	Merseyside	Paula Abdul	"Straight Up"
2	Frederick Gardener	Camberley	Frank Sinatra	"Strangers in the Night"
3	Jon Robinson	Harrow	Boy George of Culture Club	"Karma Chameleon"
4	Julie Bellemy	Rotherham	Crystal Gayle	"Don't It Make My Brown Eyes Blue"
5	Mark Keely	Gravesend	Cliff Richard	"Living Doll"

Episode 3 (5 June 1993)

Order	Contestant	From	Appeared as	Performing
1	Heather Thompson	Amble	Gloria Estefan	"Get on Your Feet"
2	Pat Cairns	Glasgow	Kenny Rogers	"Ruby, Don't Take Your Love to Town"
3	Paul Henderson	Peterborough	David Bowie	"Space Oddity"
4	James Ogoms	Birmingham	Lionel Richie	"All Night Long (All Night)"
5	Lorraine Miller	Edinburgh	Dusty Springfield	"You Don't Have to Say You Love Me"

Episode 4 (12 June 1993)

Order	Contestant	From	Appeared as	Performing
1	Steve McCormack	High Wycombe	Billy Idol	"White Wedding"
2	Sonia Hudson	Newcastle-upon-Tyne	Tammy Wynette	"Stand by Your Man"
3	Gerry Grant	Kidsgrove	Roy Orbison	"It's Over"
4	Stephen Dawson		Harry Connick, Jr.	"Recipe for Love"
5	Tara Lewis	Tonyrefail	Lulu	"Shout"

Episode 5 (19 June 1993)

Order	Contestant	From	Appeared as	Performing
1	Ian Fenn	Oldham	Bill Haley of Bill Haley & His Comets	"Rock Around the Clock"
2	Brendan Mullarkey	Widnes	David Essex	"Hold Me Close"
3	Christie Stevens	West Midlands	Mariah Carey	"Vision of Love"
4	Garry Sneddon	Falkirk	Marc Almond of Soft Cell	"Tainted Love"
5	Alistair Allen	East Kilbride	Elton John	"Sacrifice"

Episode 6 (26 June 1993)

Order	Contestant	From	Appeared as	Performing
1	Marc Anthony	London	Prince	"Cream"
2	Brenda Ganda	Ilford	Linda Ronstadt	"Blue Bayou"
3	Gary Anderson	Portsmouth	Curtis Stigers	"I Wonder Why"
4	Paul Ansett	London	Frankie Valli of The Four Seasons	"Sherry"
5	Lizena Reese	Llanelli	Mary Hopkin	"Those Were the Days"

Episode 7 (3 July 1993)

Order	Contestant	From	Appeared as	Performing
1	Gary Crowley	Blantyre	Axl Rose of Guns N' Roses	"Paradise City"
2	Joanna York	Yorkshire	Judy Garland	"The Man That Got Away"
3	Dave Culver	Southsea	Matt Monro	"Born Free"
4	Andy Wood	Grimsby	Michael Bolton	"When A Man Loves A Woman"
5	Ian Scott	Dundee	Peter Noone of Herman's Hermits	"I'm into Something Good"

Episode 8 (10 July 1993)

Order	Contestant	From	Appeared as	Performing
1	Dave Pinky	Scarborough	Chris Rea	"Let's Dance"
2	Lorraine Barnes	Hampstead	Vanessa Williams	"Save the Best for Last"
3	Lawrence Gilmour	Germany	Paul McCartney of The Beatles	"The Long and Winding Road"
4	Dave Hughes	Soho	Rick Astley	"Never Gonna Give You Up"
5	Sue Baker	Colchester	Anne Murray	"You Needed Me"

Episode 9 (17 July 1993)

Order	Contestant	From	Appeared as	Performing
1	Steve Murray	Saddleworth	Meat Loaf	"Bat Out of Hell"
2	Jacqui Cann	Norfolk	Alison Moyet	"That Ole Devil Called Love"
3	Les Darnell	Eastbourne	Perry Como	"It's Impossible"
4	Charlene-Clare Mansfield-Pearce	Bournemouth	Helen Shapiro	"Walkin' Back to Happiness"
5	Harry Cambridge	South London	Luther Vandross	"So Amazing"

=== Live Grand Final (24 July 1993) ===
- With special guest Amanda Normansell as Patsy Cline performing "Sweet Dreams"

Order	Grand Finalist	Winner of Episode...	Appeared as	Performing	Total score	Place
1	Gary Ryan	1 (22 May 1993)	Neil Diamond	"Cracklin' Rosie"	35,942	2nd
2	Jon Robinson	2 (29 May 1993)	Boy George	"Do You Really Want to Hurt Me"	7,749	7th
3	Pat Cairns	3 (5 June 1993)	Kenny Rogers	"Lucille"	19,675	5th
4	Tara Lewis	4 (12 June 1993)	Lulu	"Boom Bang-a-Bang"	4,547	9th
5	Christie Stevens	5 (19 June 1993)	Mariah Carey	"Love Takes Time"	12,759	6th
6	Gary Anderson	6 (26 June 1993)	Curtis Stigers	"You're All That Matters to Me"	20,892	3rd
7	Ian Scott	7 (3 July 1993)	Peter Noone	"Something's Happening"	20,482	4th
8	Lorraine Barnes	8 (10 July 1993)	Vanessa Williams	"Dreamin'"	6,142	8th
9	Jacqui Cann	9 (17 July 1993)	Alison Moyet	"All Cried Out"^{2}	40,657	1st

^{2} Performed twice on Stars in Their Eyes. The first was in the fifth episode of the first series.

NOTE: The finalists started in the order of the episodes they won. The Number of Episodes also made it the first Grand Final to have 9 Grand Finalists in front of a live audience.

=== Christmas Special (1 January 1994) ===
Order	Former contestant	Who Appeared on Series...	Appeared as	Performing
1	Frank Roche	3 (1992)	Gary Glitter	"Another Rock and Roll Christmas"
2	Brendan Mullarkey	4 (1993)	David Essex	"A Winter's Tale"
3	Sharon Terri, Jackie McFall, Sharon Woodward, Frederick Gardener, Bernard Wenton, Gary Sneddon	Sharon: 4 (1993), Jackie: 1 (1990), Sharon: 3 (1992), Frederick: 4 (1993), Bernard: 2 (1991) and Gary: 4 (1993)	Cyndi Lauper, Madonna, Cilla Black, Frank Sinatra, Nat King Cole and Marc Almond	"Santa Baby"; "'Zat You, Santa Claus?"
4	Richard Monroe	2 (1991)	Johnny Mathis	"When a Child Is Born"
5	Jimmy Jermaine	1 (1990)	Cliff Richard	"Mistletoe and Wine"
6	Gary Crowley, Steve McCormack, Dieter Graham, Paul McCafferty, Steve Murray	Gary: 4 (1993), Steve: 4 (1993), Dieter: 2 (1991), Paul: 3 (1992) & Steve: 4 (1993)	Axl Rose, Billy Idol, Elton John, Bryan Adams and Meat Loaf	"Run Run Rudolph"; "Rudolph the Red-Nosed Reindeer"; "All I Want for Christmas Is My Two Front Teeth"; "Santa Claus Is Coming to Town"
7	John Prescott and Joe Baron	John: Elvis Special (1993) and Joe: 2 (1991)	Elvis Presley and Bing Crosby	"Blue Christmas"; "White Christmas"
8	Gary Ryan, Jon Robinson, Tara Lewis, Christie Stevens, Gary Anderson, Ian Scott, Lorraine Barnes and Jacqui Cann	4 (1993)	Neil Diamond, Boy George, Lulu, Mariah Carey, Curtis Stigers, Peter Noone, Vanessa Williams and Alison Moyet	"White Christmas"^{1}

^{1} The same song was also performed by Bing Crosby earlier in the same episode.

NOTE: The only 1993 finalist not to return was Pat Cairns as Kenny Rogers, possibly because he was unavailable.

== 1994 ==
Stars in Their Eyes Special (7 May 1994)

Order	Former contestant	Who appeared on series...	Appeared as	Performing
1	Gary Ryan	4 (1993)	Neil Diamond	"America"
2	Harry Cambridge	4 (1993)	Luther Vandross	"Never Too Much"
3	Pat Cairns and Sonia Hudson	4 (1993)	Kenny Rogers and Tammy Wynette	"We've Got Tonight"
4	Gerry Grant	4 (1993)	Roy Orbison	"Oh, Pretty Woman"
5	Jacky Webbe	3 (1992)	Diana Ross	"I'm Still Waiting"
6	Peter Elliott	3 (1992)	Stevie Wonder	"Isn't She Lovely"

=== Series 5 ===
Episode 1 (14 May 1994)

Order	Contestant	From	Appeared as	Performing
1	Terry Slater	Preston	Tom Jones	"Help Yourself"
2	Linzi Hunter	Stockton-on-Tees	Kate Bush	"Wuthering Heights"
3	Jimmy Stanley	Stoke-on-Trent	Robin Gibb of the Bee Gees	"Massachusetts"
4	Michelle Spence	Edinburgh	Sonia	"Better The Devil You Know"
5	Steve Hevican	Walsall	Willie Nelson	"Always on My Mind"

Episode 2 (21 May 1994)

Order	Contestant	From	Appeared as	Performing
1	Chris Pavlou	South London	Alice Cooper	"School's Out"
2	Julie Conley	Oldham	Marie Osmond	"Paper Roses"
3	David Thompson	Bromley	Paul Anka	"Diana"
4	Sharon Hepburn	Sutton	Whitney Houston	"I Will Always Love You"
5	Paul Sansome	Southampton	Paul Young	"Wherever I Lay My Hat (That's My Home)"

Episode 3 (28 May 1994)

Order	Contestant	From	Appeared as	Performing
1	Carly Michaels	Chester	Brenda Lee	"Let's Jump the Broomstick"
2	Gil Wood	Plymouth	Don McLean	"American Pie"
3	Paul King	Shooter's Hill	Richard Fairbrass of Right Said Fred	"Deeply Dippy"
4	Roger Mowbray	Tadworth	Howard Keel	"Oh, What a Beautiful Mornin'" from Oklahoma!
5	Laura Sloan	Bangor	Olivia Newton-John	"I Honestly Love You"

Episode 4 (4 June 1994)

Order	Contestant	From	Appeared as	Performing
1	David Clark	Telford	George Formby	"When I'm Cleaning Windows"
2	Sarah Beanie	New Barn near Gravesend	Madonna	"Vogue"
3	Martin Roe	Barnsley	Kenny Thomas	"Best of You"
4	Rita Flindell	Kenley	Joan Baez	"The Night They Drove Old Dixie Down"
5	Foy Vance	Groomsport	Andrew Strong of The Commitments	"Mustang Sally"

Episode 5 (11 June 1994)

Order	Contestant	From	Appeared as	Performing
1	Michael Caine	Hull	Gene Pitney	"24 Hours from Tulsa"
2	Sarah Murphy	South of Stirling	Gabrielle	"Dreams"
3	Gerry Mikitish		Cliff Richard	"The Young Ones"
4	Bill McKenzie	Livingston	Jim Reeves	"Welcome To My World"
5	Emma Whitney and Julie Richards	Oswestry	Shakespears Sister	"Stay"

Episode 6 (18 June 1994)

Order	Contestant	From	Appeared as	Performing
1	Charla Dee	Sutton Coldfield	Judy Garland	"Over the Rainbow" (Somewhere Over the Rainbow) from The Wizard of Oz
2	Lee Jackson	Prestwich	Jon Bon Jovi of Bon Jovi	"You Give Love a Bad Name"
3	Karen Corden	Doncaster	Tanita Tikaram	"Good Tradition"
4	Jane McKell	Weymouth	Sarah Brightman	"Wishing You Were Somehow Here Again" from The Phantom of the Opera
5	Mike Nulty	March near Cambridge	Marty Robbins	"Devil Woman"

Episode 7 (25 June 1994)

Order	Contestant	From	Appeared as	Performing
1	John Corrigan	Bury	Neil Sedaka	"That's When The Music Takes Me"
2	Cameron Muir	Dumbarton	Mick Hucknall of Simply Red	"For Your Babies"
3	Amanda Lilley	Weymouth	Linda Perry of 4 Non Blondes	"What's Up?"
4	Robert Lamberti	Scunthorpe	George Michael	"Faith"^{2}
5	Tracey Saunders	Romford	Connie Francis	"Who's Sorry Now?"

^{2} Performed twice on Stars in Their Eyes. The first was in the second episode of the first series.

Episode 8 (2 July 1994)

Order	Contestant	From	Appeared as	Performing
1	Connor Ferris	North London	Ali Campbell of UB40	"Kingston Town"
2	Sheila Robinson	Warrington	Helen Reddy	"Angie Baby"
3	Al Francis	Leeds	Cliff Richard^{2}	"Devil Woman"
4	Terry McGeary	Hull	Justin Hayward of The Moody Blues	"Nights in White Satin"
5	Sandra Cosgrove	Carlingford Lough	Eddi Reader of Fairground Attraction	"Perfect"

^{2} Impersonated twice in the same series of Stars in Their Eyes. The first impersonation of the same star was in the fifth episode of the same series.

Episode 9 (9 July 1994)

Order	Contestant	From	Appeared as	Performing
1	Ian and David Fort	Blackpool	The Everly Brothers	"Bye Bye Love"
2	Lisa Brooks	Hereford	Susanna Hoffs of The Bangles	"Manic Monday"
3	Gary Oliver	Westcliff-on-Sea near Southend-on-Sea	Bobby Goldsboro	"Honey"
4	Jean Garside	Manchester	Jennifer Rush	"The Power of Love"^{2}
5	John Finch	Wigan	Marti Pellow of Wet Wet Wet	"Goodnight Girl"

^{2} Performed twice on Stars in Their Eyes. The first was in the second episode of the second series.

==== Live Grand Final (16 July 1994) ====
- With special guest Jacqui Cann as Alison Moyet performing "Whispering Your Name"

Order	Grand Finalist	Winner of Episode...	Appeared as	Performing	Total score	Place
1	Terry Slater	1 (14 May 1994)	Tom Jones	"Help Yourself"	14,678	8th
2	Sharon Hepburn	2 (21 May 1994)	Whitney Houston	"I Will Always Love You"	30,579	3rd
3	Paul King	3 (28 May 1994)	Richard Fairbrass	"Deeply Dippy"	12,633	9th
4	David Clark	4 (4 June 1994)	George Formby	"When I'm Cleaning Windows"	22,216	5th
5	Bill McKenzie	5 (11 June 1994)	Jim Reeves	"Welcome To My World"	16,728	6th
6	Lee Jackson	6 (18 June 1994)	Jon Bon Jovi	"You Give Love a Bad Name"	15,451	7th
7	Robert Lamberti	7 (25 June 1994)	George Michael	"Faith"	27,882	4th
8	Sandra Cosgrove	8 (2 July 1994)	Eddi Reader	"Perfect"	30,877	2nd
9	John Finch	9 (9 July 1994)	Marti Pellow	"Goodnight Girl"	150,255	1st

Winners Special (24 December 1994)

Order	Former contestant	Champion of series...	Appeared as	Performing
1	Maxine Barrie	1 (1990)	Shirley Bassey	"Big Spender"
2	Bernard Wenton	2 (1991)	Nat King Cole	"Let's Face the Music and Dance"
3	Amanda Normansall	3 (1992)	Patsy Cline	"Always"
4	Jacqui Cann	4 (1993)	Alison Moyet	"Love Letters"
5	John Finch	5 (1994)	Marti Pellow	"Love Is All Around"
6	Maxine Barrie, Bernard Wenton, Amanda Normansall, Jacqui Cann and John Finch	Maxine: 1 (1990), Bernard: 2 (1991), Amanda: 3 (1992), Jacqui: 4 (1993) and John: 5 (1994)	Shirley Bassey, Nat King Cole, Patsy Cline, Alison Moyet and Marti Pellow	"With a Little Help from My Friends"^{1}

^{1} Performed twice on Stars in Their Eyes but once with another act. The first performance of the same song was performed by Brian Farrell as Joe Cocker in the first episode of the fourth series.

== 1995 ==
=== Series 6 ===
Episode 1 (6 May 1995)

Order	Contestant	From	Appeared on the show as...	Performing
1	David De Roeck	South of Doncaster	Benny Hill	"Ernie (The Fastest Milkman in the West)"
2	Bianca Kinane	London (County Tipperary (Originally))	Mariah Carey	"Hero"
3	Chris Irvine	Dagenham (Belfast (Originally))	Peter Cox of Go West	"We Close Our Eyes"
4	Starret Francois	High Wycombe	Ray Charles	"Take These Chains from My Heart"
5	Eulalie Reynolds	London NW10	Ronnie Spector of The Ronettes	"Be My Baby"

Episode 2 (13 May 1995)

Order	Contestant	From	Appeared on the show as...	Performing
1	Andrew Davis	Swansea	Topol	"If I Were A Rich Man" from Fiddler on the Roof
2	Stan Sloane	Cornwall	Mark Owen of Take That	"Babe"
3	Michelle Tracey	Manchester	Loretta Lynn	"Coal Miner's Daughter"
4	Carlene Clark	Camberwell	Janet Jackson	"Again"
5	Neil Jones	Stockport	Eddie Cochran	"Summertime Blues"

Episode 3 (20 May 1995)

Order	Contestant	From	Appeared on the show as...	Performing
1	Paul Lynas	Chesterfield	Harry Connick, Jr.	"We Are In Love"
2	Robert Lewis	Glossop	Shakin' Stevens	"Lipstick, Powder and Paint"
3	Mark Dawes	Worsley near Manchester	Michael Stipe of R.E.M.	"Losing My Religion"
4	Angela Scott-Walker	Islington, North London	Billie Holiday	"Good Morning Heartache"
5	Derek Madison	The New Forest (Scarborough (Originally))	Pat Boone	"April Love"

Episode 4 (27 May 1995)

Order	Contestant	From	Appeared on the show as...	Performing
1	Deborah Meeks	High Wycombe	k.d. lang	"Constant Craving"
2	Kevin Moore	Wakefield	Phil Lynott of Thin Lizzy	"The Boys Are Back in Town"
3	Andrew Cardno	Peterhead near Aberdeen	Johnny Cash	"A Boy Named Sue"
4	Andrew Bagnell	Birdwell, South Yorkshire	Bono of U2	"With or Without You"
5	Gina Westhead	Higher Kinnerton	Brenda Lee	"Sweet Nothin's"

Episode 5 (3 June 1995)

Order	Contestant	From	Appeared on the show as...	Performing
1	Colin Grethe	St. Helens	Rolf Harris	"Two Little Boys"
2	Clare Horgan	Coventry	Lisa Stansfield	"Change"
3	Richard Oliver	Banbury	Michael Crawford	"The Music of the Night" from The Phantom of the Opera
4	Emma Curtis	Hainault	Dolly Parton	"Jolene"
5	Sam Pulumbarit	Clacton-on-Sea (The Philippines (Originally))	Ritchie Valens	"La Bamba"

Episode 6 (10 June 1995)

Order	Contestant	From	Appeared on the show as...	Performing
1	Sonia Robinson	Scunthorpe	Karen Carpenter of The Carpenters	"Rainy Days and Mondays"
2	Kenny Highland	Hayes, Middlesex	Garth Brooks	"The Red Strokes"
3	Obi Anyanwu	Hackney, London	James Ingram	"Yah Mo B There"
4	Ian Soulsby	Bromley	Suggs of Madness	"House of Fun"
5	Lee Stevens	Hendon, London (Manchester (Originally))	Tony Bennett	"I Left My Heart in San Francisco"

Episode 7 (17 June 1995)

Order	Contestant	From	Appeared on the show as...	Performing
1	Jan Brett	Blackpool	Alma Cogan	"Dreamboat"
2	Paul Dean	St. Helens	Michael Bolton	"Love Is A Wonderful Thing"
3	Mavis Clark	Plumstead	Randy Crawford	"One Day I'll Fly Away"
4	Mark Rodway	Wrexham	Andy Bell of Erasure	"Love to Hate You"
5	Jack Mills	Bournemouth (London (Originally))	Frank Sinatra	"Let Me Try Again"

Episode 8 (24 June 1995)

Order	Contestant	From	Appeared on the show as...	Performing
1	Aaron McGee	Leicester	Jimmy Osmond	"Long Haired Lover from Liverpool"
2	Julie Waldron	Stockport	Cher	"Love and Understanding"
3	Paul Riesen	Hinckley	Billy Joel	"Just the Way You Are"
4	Gail Edwards	Skewen	Kiki Dee	"Amoureuse"
5	David MacLean	Blackpool	Tony Christie	"Is This the Way to Amarillo"

Episode 9 (1 July 1995)

Order	Contestant	From	Appeared on the show as...	Performing
1	Adrian Pye	Tibberton near Gloucester	Neil Tennant of The Pet Shop Boys	"Go West"
2	Belinda Campbell	Twickenham	Janis Joplin	"High Heel Sneakers"
3	Karl Aides	Ashford, Kent	Johnny Logan	"What's Another Year"
4	Grace Shepherd	South London (Birmingham (Originally))	Kim Appleby	"Don't Worry"
5	Lee Griffiths	Shoreham-by-Sea	Bobby Darin	"Mack the Knife"

NOTE: This episode of this series of Stars in Their Eyes featured a Door Bell challenge from You Bet! completed by the second star guest.

==== Live Grand Final (8 July 1995) ====
- With special guest John Finch as Marti Pellow performing "Love Is All Around"

Order	Grand Finalist	Winner of Episode...	Appeared as	Performing	Total Score	Place
1	Bianca Kinane	1 (6 May 1995)	Mariah Carey	"Hero"	42,374	6th
2	Stan Sloane	2 (13 May 1995)	Mark Owen	"Babe"	75,231	3rd
3	Mark Daws	3 (20 May 1995)	Michael Stipe	"Losing My Religion"	100,004	2nd
4	Andrew Bagnall	4 (27 May 1995)	Bono	"With or Without You"	27,073	8th
5	Clare Horgan	5 (3 June 1995)	Lisa Stansfield	"Change"	23,764	9th
6	Obi Anyanwu	6 (10 June 1995)	James Ingram	"Yah Mo B There"	61,994	4th
7	Mavis Clark	7 (17 June 1995)	Randy Crawford	"One Day, I'll Fly Away"	54,958	5th
8	Paul Riesen	8 (24 June 1995)	Billy Joel	"Just The Way You Are"	39,216	7th
9	Lee Griffiths	9 (1 July 1995)	Bobby Darin	"Mack the Knife"	177,757	1st

NOTE: After the grand total for Obi Anyanwu as James Ingram (winner of Episode 6) was announced, Matthew Kelly announced – while the edition was off the air – that a record company had rung up and offered Anyanwu a contract.

Christmas Special (23 December 1995)

Order	Former contestant	Who Appeared on Series...	Appeared as	Performing
1	Eulalie Reynolds	6 (1995)	Ronnie Spector	"Sleigh Ride"
2	Paul Dean	6 (1995)	Michael Bolton	"Have Yourself a Merry Little Christmas"
3	Chris Pavlou	5 (1994)	Alice Cooper	"No More Mr. Nice Guy"
4	Deborah Meeks and Mark Rodway	6 (1995)	k.d. lang and Andy Bell	"No More Tears (Enough Is Enough)"
5	Colin Grethe, David Clarke and David De Roeck	Colin: 6 (1995), David: 5 (1994) & David: 6 (1995)	Rolf Harris, George Formby and Benny Hill	"Jake the Peg"; "With My Little Ukulele in My Hand"; "All I Want for Christmas Is My Two Front Teeth"^{1}; "Where Does Father Christmas Hang His Stocking?"
6	Bianca Kinane, Stan Sloane, Mark Dawes, Andrew Bagnell, Clare Horgan, Obi Anyanwu, Mavis Clark, Paul Riesen and Lee Griffiths	6 (1995)	Mariah Carey, Mark Owen, Michael Stipe, Bono, Lisa Stansfield, James Ingram, Randy Crawford, Billy Joel and Bobby Darin	"Silent Night"

^{1} Performed twice on Stars in Their Eyes but once with another act. The first performance of the same song was performed by Various Artists in the 1993 Christmas special episode broadcast on New Years Day 1994.

NOTE: This Christmas Special was the Last Christmas special episode before the year 2000.

== 1996 ==
=== Series 7 ===
Episode 1 (2 March 1996)

Order	Contestant	From	Appeared on the show as...	Performing
1	Terry Nash	Bournemouth	Meat Loaf	"Dead Ringer for Love"
2	Lynn Norton	Hertfordshire	Maria McKee	"Show Me Heaven" from Days of Thunder
3	Adrian Bell	West London	Donovan	"Catch the Wind"
4	Cathy Ellis	Huddersfield	Gloria Estefan	"Can't Stay Away from You"
5	Mark Cooley	Oxford	Marvin Gaye	"I Heard it Through the Grapevine"

Episode 2 (9 March 1996)

Order	Contestant	From	Appeared on the show as...	Performing
1	Leeward Francis	Preston	Seal	"Killer"
2	Michelle Barrett	Leeds	Dina Carroll	"Don't Be A Stranger"
3	Liam Moore	Liverpool	Phil Collins	"Another Day in Paradise"
4	Paul Jones	Cookham	Eric Clapton	"Tears in Heaven"
5	Robert Critchell	Watford	Bobby Vee	"The Night Has A Thousand Eyes"

Episode 3 (16 March 1996)

Order	Contestant	From	Appeared on the show as...	Performing
1	Tracey Creasey	Northampton	Toyah Willcox of Toyah	"It's A Mystery"
2	Martin Dominique	Portsmouth	Mario Lanza	"Be My Love"
3	Ian Thorpe	Wakefield	Marc Almond	"Jacky"
4	Calum Jensen	South Shields	Steve Harley	"Make Me Smile (Come Up and See Me)"
5	Samantha Tucker	Tamworth	Lisa Loeb	"Stay (I Missed You)"

Episode 4 (23 March 1996)

Order	Contestant	From	Appeared on the show as...	Performing the song...
1	Keith Newman and Ron Payne	Havant and Waterlooville	Chas & Dave	"Ain't No Pleasing You"
2	Donna Elson	Oldham	Stockard Channing	"There are Worse Things I Could Do" from Grease
3	Gregory Lawrence	Peterborough	Fats Domino	"Blueberry Hill"
4	John Paul McGilvray	Glasgow	Sean Maguire	"Now I've Found You"
5	George Payas	Basingstoke	Jon Bon Jovi of Bon Jovi	"Always"

Episode 5 (30 March 1996)

Order	Contestant	From	Appeared on the show as...	Performing
1	Shaun Cavanagh	Selhurst	Tommy Steele	"Flash, Bang, Wallop!"
2	Kim Redpath	Edinburgh	Celine Dion	"Think Twice"
3	Paul Davis	Liverpool	David Bowie	"Starman"
4	June McCarthy	Stockport	Mary Hopkin	"Knock, Knock Who's There?"
5	James Smith	Stonehaven	Brad Roberts of Crash Test Dummies	"Mmm Mmm Mmm Mmm"

Episode 6 (6 April 1996)

Order	Contestant	From	Appeared on the show as...	Performing
1	Michael Devlin	Coston	Billy Ray Cyrus	"Achy Breaky Heart"
2	Amanda White	Lewisham	Dinah Washington	"Mad About the Boy"
3	Eddie Nightingale	Manchester	Gene Pitney	"Something's Gotten Hold of My Heart"
4	Graham McSporran	Livingston	Jim Kerr of Simple Minds	"Don't You (Forget About Me)"
5	Paul Lloyd	Merthyr Tydfil	Van Morrison	"Brown Eyed Girl"

Episode 7 (13 April 1996)

Order	Contestant	From	Appeared on the show as...	Performing
1	Paul McCoy	Skelmersdale	Gilbert O'Sullivan	"Matrimony"^{2}
2	Ruth Armstrong	Acklington	Kate Bush	"Army Dreamers"
3	Les Green	Cwmbran	Gary Barlow of Take That	"A Million Love Songs"
4	Colin Gould	Harefield	Billy Fury	"Halfway to Paradise"
5	Michelle Leeks-Musselwhite	West Midlands	Pat Benatar	"We Belong"

^{2} Performed twice on Stars in Their Eyes. The first was in the third episode of the third series.

Episode 8 (20 April 1996)

Order	Contestant	From	Appeared on the show as...	Performing
1	Paul Doody	Canterbury	Marti Pellow of Wet Wet Wet	"Somewhere Somehow"
2	Carol Maddy	Llanharan	Dolly Parton	"9 to 5"
3	Steve Cherelle	Southend-on-Sea	John Denver	"Annie's Song"
4	Stella Gould	West Sussex	Janis Joplin	"Me and Bobby McGee"
5	Andrew Browning	Hampshire	George Michael	"Kissing A Fool"

Episode 9 (27 April 1996)

Order	Contestant	From	Appeared on the show as...	Performing
1	Dawn Joseph	Jersey	Heather Small of M People	"Moving on Up"
2	Gary Smith	Norfolk	Neil Young	"Heart of Gold"
3	Steve Phelps	Stoke Ferry	Elvis Costello	"Oliver's Army"
4	Joanna Woodstock	Whitefield	Oleta Adams	"Get Here"
5	Alan Gibson	Derby	Jim Reeves	"I Won't Forget You"

Episode 10 (4 May 1996)

Order	Contestant	From	Appeared on the show as...	Performing
1	John Fisher	Reading	Peter Cunnah of D:Ream	"Things Can Only Get Better"
2	Patsy Frost	Portsmouth	Tammy Wynette	"D-I-V-O-R-C-E"
3	John McQuaker	North Yorkshire	Lou Gramm of Foreigner	"I Want to Know What Love Is"
4	Michael Syvier	Chesterfield	Tennessee Ernie Ford	"Sixteen Tons"
5	Lorraine Kenny	Wallasey	Tina Arena	"Chains"

Episode 11 (11 May 1996)

Order	Contestant	From	Appeared on the show as...	Performing
1	Paul Featherstone	Mansfield	Billy Idol	"Mony Mony"
2	Stephen Rose	Liverpool	Glenn Tilbrook of Squeeze	"Labelled with Love"
3	Tania Carter	Northampton	Janet Jackson	"That's The Way Love Goes"
4	Danny Owen	Witham	Julio Iglesias	"Crazy"^{1}
5	Monica Shepherd	Essex	Judy Collins	"Both Sides Now"

^{1} Performed twice on Stars in Their Eyes but once by another act. The first performance of the same song was by Amanda Normansell as Patsy Cline in the fourth episode of the third series.

Episode 12 (18 May 1996)

Order	Contestant	From	Appeared on the show as...	Performing
1	Joanne Ravenscroft	Stoke-on-Trent	Sheryl Crow	"All I Wanna Do"
2	Gary Coalthard	Nottinghamshire	James Taylor	"Fire and Rain"
3	Matt Ford	Bedford	Harry Connick, Jr.	"It Had To Be You"
4	Stan Fuller	Tyne and Wear	Barry Gibb of The Bee Gees	"Tragedy" from Saturday Night Fever
5	Sandra Robinson	South London	Anita Baker	"Sweet Love"

==== Live Grand Final (25 May 1996) ====
- With special guest Lee Griffiths as Bobby Darin performing "Mack the Knife"

Order	Grand Finalist	Winner of Episode...	Appeared as	Performing	Total score	Place
1	Lynn Norton	1 (2 March 1996)	Maria McKee	"Show Me Heaven"	81,500	7th
2	Robert Critchell	2 (9 March 1996)	Bobby Vee	"The Night Has A Thousand Eyes"	60,141	10th
3	Martin Dominique	3 (16 March 1996)	Mario Lanza	"Be My Love"	68,178	9th
4	Gregory Lawrence	4 (23 March 1996)	Fats Domino	"Blueberry Hill"	156,963	2nd
5	Kim Redpath	5 (30 March 1996)	Celine Dion	"Think Twice"	122,500	3rd
6	Amanda White	6 (6 April 1996)	Dinah Washington	"Mad About The Boy"	48,564	12th
7	Paul McCoy	7 (13 April 1996)	Gilbert O'Sullivan	"Matrimony"	55,300	11th
8	Paul Doody	8 (20 April 1996)	Marti Pellow	"Somewhere Somehow"	178,212	1st
9	Dawn Joseph	9 (27 April 1996)	Heather Small	"Movin' On Up"	94,965	6th
10	John McQuaker	10 (4 May 1996)	Lou Gramm	"I Want To Know What Love Is"	95,603	5th
11	Stephen Rose	11 (11 May 1996)	Glenn Tilbrook	"Labelled with Love"	118,358	4th
12	Sandra Robinson	12 (18 May 1996)	Anita Baker	"Sweet Love"	78,843	8th

NOTE: This was the first live final to have 12 Grand Finalists instead of 9 after Matthew Kelly left You Bet! the previous year, due to the number of episodes increasing to 13 after 3 years.

== 1997 ==
=== Series 8 ===
Episode 1 (15 March 1997)

Order	Contestant	From	Appeared on the show as...	Performing
1	Susanne Walters	Essex	Ethel Merman	"There's No Business Like Show Business" from Annie Get Your Gun
2	Jason Dzikowski	Chester	Paul Heaton of The Housemartins and The Beautiful South	"One Last Love Song"
3	Gareth Dickinson	Castleford	Jarvis Cocker of Pulp	"Common People"
4	Andrew Williams	Aberdare	Tom Jones	"A Boy From Nowhere"
5	Roger Herron and Kelly Warden	Central London	Peters and Lee	"Welcome Home"

NOTE: This episode was the last episode to feature a double-act before the year 2000.

Episode 2 (22 March 1997)

Order	Contestant	From	Appeared on the show as...	Performing
1	Gwyn Allen	Richmond	Louis Armstrong	"We Have All the Time in the World"
2	Steve Edward	Scunthorpe	Julian Clary	"Leader of the Pack"
3	Lisa Hobman	West Yorkshire	Alanis Morissette	"Hand in My Pocket"
4	Francis White	Maidenhead	Mick Jagger of The Rolling Stones	"Paint it Black"
5	Camilla Huhtaniemi	North London (Sweden and Finland (Originally))	Marie Fredriksson of Roxette	"It Must Have Been Love" from Pretty Woman

Episode 3 (29 March 1997)

Order	Contestant	From	Appeared on the show as...	Performing
1	Emma Treacy	Crawley	Björk	"It's Oh So Quiet"
2	Steve Brassington	Portland, Dorset	Michael Ball	"Empty Chairs at Empty Tables" from Les Misérables
3	Mark Slade	Stevenage	Gary Puckett of Gary Puckett and The Union Gap	"Young Girl"
4	Sian Tebay	Middlesbrough	Susanna Hoffs of The Bangles	"Eternal Flame"
5	Russell Crimes	Colchester (Farnborough (Originally))	Pat Kane of Hue and Cry	"Looking for Linda"

Episode 4 (5 April 1997)

Order	Contestant	From	Appeared on the show as...	Performing
1	Martin Lewis	Cardiff	Tony Hadley of Spandau Ballet	"Gold"^{2}
2	Bernetta Batchelor	Birmingham	Phyllis Nelson	"Move Closer"
3	Les Short	Cramlington, Northumberland	Paul Carrack of Mike + The Mechanics	"The Living Years"
4	Simon Bowskill	Telford	Marcel Kapteijn of Ten Sharp	"You"
5	Elaine Hanks	Bromley	Peggy Lee	"Fever"

^{2} Performed twice on Stars in Their Eyes. The first was in the third episode of the second series.

Episode 5 (12 April 1997)

Order	Contestant	From	Appeared on the show as...	Performing
1	Shay Stevens	Weybridge (New York (Originally))	Donna Summer	"Last Dance"
2	James Chadwick	South Kirkby near Pontefract	Frank Sinatra	"I've Got You Under My Skin"
3	Barry Powell	Stockport	Paul McCartney of The Beatles	"Let It Be"
4	Maxine Mazumder	Birmingham (St. Helens (Originally))	Lulu	"To Sir, with Love"
5	Darren Hay	Runcorn	Chris Rea	"Fool (If You Think It's Over)"

Episode 6 (19 April 1997)

Order	Contestant	From	Appeared on the show as...	Performing
1	Jackie Hudson	Sunderland	Brenda Lee	"Sweet Nothin's"^{2}
2	David Burrows	Glasgow	Jon Bon Jovi of Bon Jovi	"This Ain't a Love Song"
3	Chris Barrett	West London	Paul Young	"Everytime You Go Away"
4	Adele Miller	Bournemouth (Burnley (Originally))	Alannah Myles	"Black Velvet"
5	Neil Jones	Conwy	James Taylor	"You've Got a Friend"

^{2} Performed twice on Stars in Their Eyes. The first was along with "Constant Craving" by k.d. lang in the fourth episode of the sixth series.

Episode 7 (26 April 1997)

Order	Contestant	From	Appeared on the show as...	Performing
1	Robert McGlinchey	Derby	Simon Le Bon of Duran Duran	"Hungry Like the Wolf"
2	Lisa Donoghue	Worcester Park, Surrey	Tina Arena	"Chains"^{2}
3	Bob Phillips	Warwick	Bob Dylan	"The Times They Are A-Changin'"
4	Russell Marsden-Sear	Newcastle	Elton John	"Can You Feel the Love Tonight" from The Lion King
5	Gillian Doherty	Dundee	Cyndi Lauper	"Time After Time"

^{2} Performed twice on Stars in Their Eyes. The first was in the tenth episode of the seventh series.

Episode 8 (3 May 1997)

Order	Contestant	From	Appeared on the show as...	Performing
1	Errol McKenzie	Birmingham	Otis Redding	"(Sittin' On) The Dock of the Bay"
2	Stacey Grant	Blackpool (North Wales Originally))	Debbie Harry of Blondie	"Heart of Glass"
3	Gerry May	Liverpool	Perry Como	"And I Love You So"
4	Thomas Gillespie	Northern Ireland	Garth Brooks	"If Tomorrow Never Comes"
5	Sharon Lucas	Dagenham	Gabrielle	"Give Me a Little More Time"

Episode 9 (10 May 1997)

Order	Contestant	From	Appeared on the show as...	Performing
1	Gillian McCann	Glasgow	Cher	"Walking in Memphis"
2	David Elson	Glemsford, Suffolk	Bobby Vinton	"Blue Velvet"
3	Stephen Burwell	Blackheath, London (Lincoln (Originally))	Ronan Keating of Boyzone	"Father and Son"
4	Danny White	Milton Keynes	Cliff Richard	"Move It"
5	Joanne Davis	Redditch	k.d. lang	"Constant Craving"^{2}

^{2} Performed twice on Stars in Their Eyes. The first was along with "Sweet Nothin's" by Brenda Lee in the fourth episode of the sixth series.

Episode 10 (17 May 1997)

Order	Contestant	From	Appeared on the show as...	Performing
1	Ian Faulkner	Sutton Coldfield	Martin Fry of ABC	"The Look of Love"
2	Faye Dempsey	West Kirby	Olivia Newton-John	"Hopelessly Devoted to You" from Grease^{2}
3	Michael Braithwaite	Lytham St Annes	Liam Gallagher of Oasis	"Wonderwall"
4	Pete Summers	Bristol	Dean Martin	"Everybody Loves Somebody"
5	Lisa Evans	Wrexham	Madonna	"You'll See"

^{2} Performed twice on Stars in Their Eyes. The first was in the first episode of the second series.

Episode 11 (24 May 1997)

Order	Contestant	From	Appeared on the show as...	Performing
1	Dougie Orr	Borrowstounness	Roddy Frame of Aztec Camera	"Somewhere in My Heart"
2	Victoria Carlin	Dublin	Celine Dion	"Falling into You"
3	Ricky Smith	Huddersfield (Jamaica (Originally))	George Benson	"Love X Love"
4	Samantha Hitchens	Scarborough	Dolores O'Riordan of The Cranberries	"Linger"
5	Maurice Cannon	Papworth St Agnes (Akron, Ohio (Originally))	Brook Benton	"Rainy Night in Georgia"

Episode 12 (31 May 1997)

Order	Contestant	From	Appeared on the show as...	Performing
1	Louis Stevens	Seville in Spain (Surrey (Originally))	Matt Monro	"Portrait of My Love"
2	Kevin Metcalfe	Wigan	Curtis Stigers	"You're All That Matters to Me"^{2}
3	Richard Vernon	Doncaster (Rotherham (Originally))	Johnny Logan	"What's Another Year"^{2}
4	Catherine Clayton	Barrow-in-Furness	Helen Reddy	"Angie Baby"^{2}
5	Gary Nixon	Coatbridge (Derry (Originally))	Michael Stipe of R.E.M.	"Everybody Hurts"

^{2} All Performed twice on Stars in Their Eyes. The first for song number 2 was in the grand final of the fourth series, The first for song number 3 was in the ninth episode of the sixth series, and The first for song number 4 was in the eighth episode of the fifth series.

==== Live Grand Final (7 June 1997) ====
- With special guest Paul Doody as Marti Pellow performing "Somewhere Somehow"

Order	Grand Finalist	Winner of Episode...	Appeared as	Performing	Total Score	Place
1	Gareth Dickinson	1 (15 March 1997)	Jarvis Cocker	"Common People"	50,823	11th
2	Gwyn Allen	2 (22 March 1997)	Louis Armstrong	"We Have All the Time In The World"	103,964	5th
3	Sian Tebay	3 (29 March 1997)	Susanna Hoffs	"Eternal Flame"	40,065	12th
4	Les Short	4 (5 April 1997)	Paul Carrack	"The Living Years"	103,794	7th
5	Maxine Mazumder	5 (12 April 1997)	Lulu	"To Sir, with Love"	70,773	10th
6	David Burrows	6 (19 April 1997)	Jon Bon Jovi	"This Ain't a Love Song"	122,907	4th
7	Lisa Donoghue	7 (26 April 1997)	Tina Arena	"Chains"	132,473	3rd
8	Errol McKenzie	8 (3 May 1997)	Otis Redding	"(Sittin' On) The Dock of the Bay"	72,013	9th
9	Stephen Burwell	9 (10 May 1997)	Ronan Keating	"Father and Son"	93,365	8th
10	Faye Dempsey	10 (17 May 1997)	Olivia Newton-John	"Hopelessly Devoted To You"	287,436	1st
11	Maurice Cannon	11 (24 May 1997)	Brook Benton	"Rainy Night In Georgia"	103,836	6th
12	Gary Nixon	12 (31 May 1997)	Michael Stipe	"Everybody Hurts"	260,588	2nd

NOTE: This was the first live final to use a computer-generated scoreboard, rather than a display unit on the studio floor.

== 1998 ==
=== Series 9 ===
Episode 1 (21 March 1998)

Order	Contestant	From	Appeared as	Performing the song...
1	Sarah Willows	Bristol	Doris Day	"Que Sera, Sera"
2	Damian Grant	Old Trafford	R. Kelly	"I Believe I Can Fly" from Space Jam
3	Bobby Taylor	Southend-on-Sea	Gene Pitney	"Backstage"
4	Bernie Lowery	Redcar	Alan Barton	"I'll Meet You At Midnight"
5	Sarah Doggett	Macclesfield	Sandie Shaw	"(There's) Always Something There to Remind Me"

Episode 2 (28 March 1998)

Order	Contestant	From	Appeared as	Performing the song...
1	Lisa Kayles	Liverpool	Julie Andrews	"My Favorite Things" from The Sound of Music
2	Michael Moore	Leamington Spa	Luther Vandross	"Never Too Much"^{2}
3	Yvonne Milligan	Staffordshire	Karen Carpenter of The Carpenters	"(They Long to Be) Close to You"
4	Kevin Dewsbury	Northwich	Neil Hannon	"Everybody Knows (Except You)"
5	Ron Gletherow	Dagenham	Jim Croce	"I'll Have to Say I Love You in a Song"

^{2} Performed twice on Stars in Their Eyes. The first was in the Favourites Special episode broadcast the week before the start of fifth series.

Episode 3 (4 April 1998)

Order	Contestant	From	Appeared as	Performing the song...
1	Helen Foley	Greenwich	Mary Chapin Carpenter	"Down at the Twist and Shout"
2	Phil Lawrence	Wanstead	Gary Barlow	"Forever Love"
3	Chris Fielding	Tamworth	Gary Numan of Tubeway Army	"Are 'Friends' Electric?"
4	Melanie Reid	Handsworth	Des'ree	"You Gotta Be"
5	Mike Keen	Plymouth	Paul Rodgers of Free	"All Right Now"

Episode 4 (11 April 1998)

Order	Contestant	From	Appeared as	Performing the song...
1	Billy Tookey	Dunstable	Tom Jones	"Kiss"^{2}
2	Rita Harrison	Stoke-on-Trent	Nina Persson of The Cardigans	"Lovefool"
3	Kevin Haygarth	Pendle	Cat Stevens	"Moonshadow"
4	Sarah Cohen	Essex	Sheryl Crow	"Everyday Is a Winding Road"
5	George Anthony	Luton	Al Green	"Let's Stay Together"

^{2} Performed twice on Stars in Their Eyes. The first was along with "If I Could Turn Back Time" by Cher in the third episode of the first series.

Episode 5 (18 April 1998)

Order	Contestant	From	Appeared as	Performing the song...
1	Adrianna Foster	North London	Cher	"If I Could Turn Back Time"^{2}
2	Natalie Langstone	West Sussex	Celine Dion	"Because You Loved Me"
3	Mark Nicklen	Lincolnshire	Brian Setzer of Stray Cats	"Rock This Town"
4	Terrell Isaacs	Cornwall	Tunde Baiyewu of Lighthouse Family	"Lifted"
5	Cheryl Govan	Scarborough	Julianne Regan of All About Eve	"Martha's Harbour"

^{2} Performed twice on Stars in Their Eyes. The first was along with "Kiss" by Tom Jones in the third episode of the first series.

Episode 6 (25 April 1998)

Order	Contestant	From	Appeared as	Performing the song...
1	Brian Cleary	Liverpool	Harry Secombe	"If I Ruled the World"
2	Samantha Seymour	Lancashire	Ann Wilson of Heart	"Alone"
3	Beverly Tildersley	Devon	Judy Garland	"The Trolley Song"
4	Mark Roberts	Manchester	David Gates of Bread	"Make It with You"
5	Ross Coward	Barnsley	Dr. Robert of The Blow Monkeys	"It Doesn't Have to Be This Way"

Episode 7 (2 May 1998)

Order	Contestant	From	Appeared as	Performing the song...
1	Zara McFarlane	Dagenham	Lauryn Hill of The Fugees	"Killing Me Softly"
2	John O'Brien	Cheshire	Dennis Locorriere of Dr. Hook & The Medicine Show	"Sylvia's Mother"
3	Elaine Rennie	North Shields	Belinda Carlisle	"Heaven Is a Place on Earth"
4	Tracey Maskell	Kent	Kate Bush	"Wuthering Heights"^{2}
5	John Grant	West Midlands	Mark King of Level 42	"Leaving Me Now"

^{2} Performed twice on Stars in Their Eyes. The first was in the first episode of the fifth series.

Episode 8 (9 May 1998)

Order	Contestant	From	Appeared as	Performing the song...
1	Freddy King	Southampton	Billy Fury	"I'd Never Find Another You"
2	Caroline Lowe	Lancashire	Lisa Stansfield	"All Woman"
3	Craig Rutherford	Sunderland	Denny Doherty of The Mamas & the Papas	"Monday, Monday"
4	Les Snape	Lancashire	Johnny Mathis	"Misty"^{2}
5	Samantha Belshaw	Taunton	Amy Grant	"Big Yellow Taxi"

^{2} Performed twice on Stars in Their Eyes. The first was in the fifth episode of the first series.

Episode 9 (16 May 1998)

Order	Contestant	From	Appeared as	Performing the song...
1	Shelly Weldon	Twickenham	Carmen Miranda	"I, Yi, Yi, Yi, Yi (I Like You Very Much)"
2	Ian Davis	Rotherham	Justin Currie of Del Amitri	"Roll to Me"
3	Roy Acton	Blackpool	Gerry Marsden of Gerry and the Pacemakers	"How Do You Do It?"
4	Vanessa Perry	Canvey Island	Gwen Stefani of No Doubt	"Don't Speak"
5	Steve Chadwick	Manchester	Garth Brooks	"The Thunder Rolls"

Episode 10 (23 May 1998)

Order	Contestant	From	Appeared as	Performing the song...
1	Gary Black	Nottingham	Bryan Adams	"The Only Thing That Looks Good on Me Is You"
2	John Dickson	Edinburgh	Gerry Rafferty of Stealers Wheel	"Stuck in the Middle with You"
3	Shelly Evans	Kentish Town	Joan Osborne	"One of Us"
4	Chris Golding	Hampshire	Joe Jackson	"Is She Really Going Out with Him?"
5	Deborah Christopher	London	Billie Holiday	"These Foolish Things"

Episode 11 (30 May 1998)

Order	Contestant	From	Appeared as	Performing the song...
1	James Barrett	Blackpool	Jay Kay of Jamiroquai	"Cosmic Girl"
2	Jason Searle	Egham	Neil Diamond	"Hello Again"
3	Sharon Lee-Jones	Blackpool	Dorothy Squires	"Say It with Flowers"
4	Louise Murray	Great Yarmouth	Helen Shapiro	"Walkin' Back to Happiness"^{2}
5	Andy Bolger	Wimbledon	Don Williams	"You're My Best Friend"

^{2} Performed twice on Stars in Their Eyes The first was in the ninth episode of the fourth series.

Episode 12 (6 June 1998)

Order	Contestant	From	Appeared as	Performing the song...
1	Karen Noblett	Preston	Jacqueline Abbott of The Beautiful South	"Rotterdam"
2	Carol Durrant	Surrey	Cilla Black	"Alfie"
3	Brian Fleming	Birmingham	Andy Williams	"Almost There"
4	Pete Thompson	Cumbria	Bobby Goldsboro	"Honey"^{2}
5	Gillian Xu	Eltham	Vikki Carr	"It Must Be Him"

^{2} Performed twice on Stars in Their Eyes. The first was in the ninth episode of the fifth series.

==== Live Grand Final (13 June 1998) ====
- With special guest Faye Dempsey as Olivia Newton-John performing "Hopelessly Devoted to You" from Grease

Order	Grand Finalist	Winner of Episode...	Appeared on the show as...	Performing the song...	Total Score...	Place
1	Damian Grant	1 (21 March 1998)	R. Kelly	"I Believe I Can Fly"	85,943	7th
2	Yvonne Milligan	2 (28 March 1998)	Karen Carpenter	"(They Long to Be) Close to You"	39,347	12th
3	Phil Lawrence	3 (4 April 1998)	Gary Barlow	"Forever Love"	47,570	11th
4	George Anthony	4 (11 April 1998)	Al Green	"Let's Stay Together"	52,328	9th
5	Adrianna Foster	5 (18 April 1998)	Cher	"If I Could Turn Back Time"	103,954	6th
6	Mark Roberts	6 (25 April 1998)	David Gates	"Make It with You"	48,692	10th
7	Elaine Rennie	7 (2 May 1998)	Belinda Carlisle	"Heaven Is A Place on Earth"	174,484	3rd
8	Craig Rutherford	8 (9 May 1998)	Denny Doherty	"Monday, Monday"	67,086	8th
9	Vanessa Perry	9 (16 May 1998)	Gwen Stefani	"Don't Speak"	204,197	2nd
10	Deborah Christopher	10 (23 May 1998)	Billie Holiday	"These Foolish Things"	114,589	4th
11	Jason Searle	11 (30 May 1998)	Neil Diamond	"Hello Again"	205,333	1st
12	Karen Noblett	12 (6 June 1998)	Jacqueline Abbott	"Rotterdam"	106,092	5th

=== Celebrity special (2 December 1998) ===
Order	Celebrity	From	Appeared as	Performing
1	Carol Vorderman	Bedford	Cher	"The Shoop Shoop Song (It's In His Kiss)"^{2}
2	Frank Skinner	West Bromwich	Elvis Costello of Elvis Costello and The Attractions	"Oliver's Army"^{2}
3	Tricia Penrose	Kirkby	Lisa Stansfield	"All Around The World"
4	Steven Houghton	Barnsley	Tony Hadley of Spandau Ballet	"Gold"^{3}
5	Tracy Shaw, Gaynor Faye, Jane Danson, Holly Newman and Angela Griffin	Various	The Spice Girls (Shaw as Melanie C, Faye as Geri Halliwell, Danson as Victoria Beckham, Newman as Emma Bunton and Griffin as Mel B)	"Wannabe"

^{2} Both Performed twice on Stars in Their Eyes. The first for song number 1 was in the third of the third series, and the first for song number 2 was in the ninth episode of the seventh series.
^{3} Performed three times on Stars in Their Eyes. The first for song number 4 was in the third episode of the second series, and the second for song number 4 was in the fourth episode of the eighth series.

== 1999 ==
=== Series 10 ===
Episode 1 (13 March 1999)

Order	Contestant	From	Appeared as	Performing the song...
1	Lee Wolfe	Nottingham	Will Smith	"Men in Black" from Men in Black
2	Andrea Britton	Kent	Sam Brown	"Stop!"
3	Andy McNally	East Yorkshire	Neil Tennant of Pet Shop Boys	"Always on My Mind"^{1}
4	Donna Walker	Surrey	Wynonna Judd of The Judds	"Mama He's Crazy"
5	Keisha Fagan	Croydon	Heather Small of M People	"Search for the Hero"

^{1} Performed twice on Stars in Their Eyes but once with another act. The first performance of the same song was performed by Steve Hevican as Willie Nelson in the first episode of the fifth series.

Episode 2 (20 March 1999)

Order	Contestant	From	Appeared as	Performing the song...
1	Nicole Lawrence	Peterborough	Etta James	"I Just Want to Make Love to You"
2	Paul Metcalfe	London	Sting	"Fields of Gold"
3	Tammy Vaughan	Warwick	Natalie Imbruglia	"Torn"
4	Danni Doherty	Middlesex	Anne Murray	"You Needed Me"^{2}
5	Richard Carter	Middlesex	George Michael	"Fastlove"

^{2} Performed twice on Stars in Their Eyes. The first was in the eighth episode of the fourth series.

Episode 3 (27 March 1999)

Order	Contestant	From	Appeared as	Performing the song...
1	Linda John-Pierre	East London	Chaka Khan of Rufus & Chaka Khan	"Ain't Nobody"
2	Katie Gough	Gloucester	Andrea Corr of The Corrs	"Runaway"
3	Andrew Hall	Newcastle-under-Lyme	John Power of The Las and Cast	"Guiding Star"
4	Christine Lee-Jones	Neath	Rita MacNeil	"Working Man"
5	Mal Price	Liverpool	Paul McCartney of The Beatles	"All My Loving"

Episode 4 (3 April 1999)

Order	Contestant	From	Appeared as	Performing the song...
1	Denny Austin	Romford	Raul Malo of The Mavericks	"Dance The Night Away"
2	Emma-Kate Spencer-Galsworthy	Brighton	Alanis Morissette	"Ironic"
3	Ian Boyd	Exmouth	Ronan Keating of Boyzone	"Baby Can I Hold You"
4	Johanna Winterbottom	Manchester	Toyah Willcox of Toyah	"It's A Mystery"^{2}
5	Steve Jackson	Manchester	Barry Manilow	"Copacabana"

^{2} Performed twice on Stars in Their Eyes. The first was in the third episode of the seventh series.

Episode 5 (10 April 1999)

Order	Contestant	From	Appeared as	Performing the song...
1	Pamela Maynard	London	Gladys Knight of Gladys Knight & the Pips	"Midnight Train to Georgia"
2	John Eyre	Brecon	Ian Broudie of The Lightning Seeds	"Pure"
3	Tina Johnson	Newport	Julie Rogers	"The Wedding"
4	Jimmy Herbert	Watford	Jimmy Somerville of Bronski Beat and The Communards	"Never Can Say Goodbye"
5	Popsi Williams	London	Barry White	"You're the First, the Last, My Everything"

Episode 6 (17 April 1999)

Order	Contestant	From	Appeared as	Performing the song...
1	Joanne Paulfree	Totnes	Joan Osborne	"One of Us"
2	Christopher Nott	Dudley	David Essex	"Hold Me Close"^{2}
3	Becky Goodwin	Chorley	LeAnn Rimes	"How Do I Live"
4	Steve Murray	Liverpool	Dennis DeYoung of Styx	"Babe"
5	Ricky Maxwell	London	Tony Rich of The Tony Rich Project	"Nobody Knows"

^{2} Performed twice on Stars in Their Eyes. The first was in the fifth episode of the fourth series.

Episode 7 (24 April 1999)

Order	Contestant	From	Appeared as	Performing the song...
1	Anthony Edwards	Birmingham	Michael Jackson	"Billie Jean"
2	Deborah Bailey	Hornchurch	Billie Jo Spears	"Blanket on the Ground"
3	Mark Wilkinson	Huddersfield	Richard Marx	"Right Here Waiting"
4	Les Waters	Northumberland	Bing Crosby	"True Love"^{2}
5	Claire Ford	Enfield	Madonna	"Frozen"

^{2} Performed twice on Stars in Their Eyes. The first was in the second episode of the second series.

Episode 8 (1 May 1999)

Order	Contestant	From	Appeared as	Performing the song...
1	Emma Johnson	Mirfield	Sharleen Spiteri of Texas	"Say What You Want"
2	Alan Clennall	Longton	Buddy Holly	"True Love Ways"
3	Samia Stotes	Leytonstone	Mariah Carey	"My All"
4	Martin Barclay	Cheltenham	Jon Bon Jovi of Bon Jovi	"Always"^{2}
5	Ian Moor	Hull	Chris de Burgh	"The Lady in Red"^{2}

^{2} Both Performed twice on Stars in Their Eyes. The first for song number 4 was in the fourth episode of the seventh series, and the first for song number 5 was in the second episode of the first series.

Episode 9 (8 May 1999)

Order	Contestant	From	Appeared as	Performing the song...
1	Ian Hoor	Stourbridge	Noddy Holder of Slade	"Cum on Feel the Noize"
2	Shean Williams	Cambridge	Michael Jackson^{2}	"Ain't No Sunshine"
3	Kate Hurst	Kent	Celine Dion	"My Heart Will Go On"
4	Rachel White	Fife	Twiggy	"Here I Go Again"
5	Maxine Clark	Enfield	Oleta Adams	"Get Here"

^{2} Impersonated twice in the same series of Stars in Their Eyes. The first impersonation of the same star was in seventh episode of the same series.

Episode 10 (15 May 1999)

Order	Contestant	From	Appeared as	Performing the song...
1	Kirsty Fleming	West Lothian	Louise	"Naked"
2	Andy Hughes	Milton Keynes	Neil Finn of Crowded House	"Distant Sun"
3	Darren Richards	Kidderminster	Joshua Kadison	"Jessie"
4	Loretta O'Sullivan	Cork	Patsy Cline	"Crazy"^{2}
5	Neil Banks	Lancashire	Todd Pipes of Deep Blue Something	"Breakfast at Tiffany's"

^{2} Performed twice on Stars in Their Eyes. The first was in the fourth episode of the third series. Song number 4 was also performed once by Danny Owen as Julio Iglesias in the eleventh episode of the seventh series.

Episode 11 (22 May 1999)

Order	Contestant	From	Appeared as	Performing the song...
1	Lisa Baldwin	Chester	Kylie Minogue	"Step Back in Time"
2	Joe Campbell	Armagh	Garth Brooks	"Callin' Baton Rouge"
3	Peter Bultitude	Kettering	Phil Collins	"Against All Odds (Take a Look at Me Now)"
4	Nicola Goode	Swansea	Shania Twain	"You're Still the One"
5	Kevin Simm	Leyland	Simon Fowler of Ocean Colour Scene	"The Riverboat Song"

Episode 12 (29 May 1999)

Order	Contestant	From	Appeared as	Performing the song...
1	Karl Payne	Handsworth	Rick Astley	"Hold Me In Your Arms"
2	Paul Perkins	Telford	Sacha Distel	"Raindrops Keep Fallin' on My Head"
3	Sandra Hewitt	Mullingar	Mary Black	"No Frontiers"
4	Vincent Nayler	Rotherham	Robbie Williams	"Let Me Entertain You"
5	Diane Birkinshaw	Manchester	Diana Ross	"I'm Still Waiting"

==== Live Grand Final (5 June 1999) ====
- With special guest Jason Searle as Neil Diamond performing "Hello Again"

Order	Grand Finalist	Winner of Episode...	Appeared on the show as...	Performing the song...	Total score	Place
1	Lee Wolfe	1 (13 March 1999)	Will Smith	"Men in Black"	247,255	4th
2	Danni Doherty	2 (20 March 1999)	Anne Murray	"You Needed Me"	40,104	12th
3	Katie Gough	3 (27 March 1999)	Andrea Corr	"Runaway"	86,537	9th
4	Ian Boyd	4 (3 April 1999)	Ronan Keating	"Baby Can I Hold You"	79,547	10th
5	Tina Johnson	5 (10 April 1999)	Julie Rogers	"The Wedding"	107,264	8th
6	Becky Goodwin	6 (17 April 1999)	LeAnn Rimes	"How Do I Live"	74,272	11th
7	Claire Ford	7 (24 April 1999)	Madonna	"Frozen"	131,857	7th
8	Ian Moor	8 (1 May 1999)	Chris de Burgh	"The Lady in Red"	501,868	1st
9	Kate Hurst	9 (8 May 1999)	Celine Dion	"My Heart Will Go On"	299,789	2nd
10	Loretta O'Sullivan	10 (15 May 1999)	Patsy Cline	"Crazy"	276,049	3rd
11	Peter Bultitude	11 (22 May 1999)	Phil Collins	"Against All Odds (Take A Look at Me Now)"	202,096	5th
12	Diane Birkinshaw	12 (29 May 1999)	Diana Ross	"I'm Still Waiting"	182,846	6th

Celebrity special (9 October 1999)

Order	Celebrity	From	Appeared as	Performing
1	Michelle Collins	Hackney	Chrissie Hynde of The Pretenders	"Brass in Pocket"
2	Harry Hill	Woking	Morrissey of The Smiths	"This Charming Man"
3	Denise Welch	Tynemouth	Petula Clark	"Downtown"
4	Kirsty Young	East Kilbride	Peggy Lee	"Fever"
5	Ben Freeman	Yorkshire	Robbie Williams	"Millennium"

Champion of Champions (30 October 1999)

Order	Champion	Winner of Series...	Appeared as	Performing	Total score...	Place
1	Maxine Barrie	1 (1990)	Shirley Bassey	"Goldfinger"	45,226	7th
2	Bernard Wenton	2 (1991)	Nat King Cole	"Unforgettable"	33,385	8th
3	Amanda Normansall	3 (1992)	Patsy Cline	"Crazy"	62,494	6th
4	Jacqui Cann	4 (1993)	Alison Moyet	"All Cried Out"	16,708	10th
5	John Finch	5 (1994)	Marti Pellow	"Goodnight Girl"	29,361	9th
6	Lee Griffiths	6 (1995)	Bobby Darin	"Mack the Knife"	77,243	5th
7	Paul Doody	7 (1996)	Marti Pellow^{2}	"Somewhere Somehow"	95,469	4th
8	Faye Dempsey	8 (1997)	Olivia Newton-John	"Hopelessly Devoted to You"	110,861	3rd
9	Jason Searle	9 (1998)	Neil Diamond	"Hello Again"	178,065	2nd
10	Ian Moor	10 (1999)	Chris de Burgh	"The Lady in Red"	481,525	1st

^{2} Impersonated twice in the same episode of Stars in Their Eyes. The first was as star champion of 1994 and the second was as star champion of 1996.

== 2000 ==
Celebrity special (1 January 2000)

Order	Celebrity	From	Appeared as	Performing
1	Tracie Bennett	Clapham	Judy Garland	"Get Happy"
2	Simon Day	Blackheath	Boy George of Culture Club	"Victims"
3	Carol Harrison	West Ham	Debbie Harry of Blondie	"Call Me"
4	David Ginola	Gassin	Sacha Distel	"Raindrops Keep Fallin' on My Head"^{2}
5	Jenny Powell	Ilford	Janet Jackson	"Together Again"

^{2} Performed twice on Stars in Their Eyes. The first was in the twelfth episode of the tenth series.

=== Series 11 ===
Episode 1 (11 March 2000)

Order	Contestant	From	Appeared as	Performing
1	Annette Brown	Wood Green	Whitney Houston	"It's Not Right, But It's Okay"
2	David Henry	Hackney	Philip Bailey of Earth, Wind & Fire	"Fantasy"
3	Liz Leng	North London	Annie Lennox of Eurythmics	"Sweet Dreams (Are Made of This)"
4	Chris Sibley	Harefield	Jack Jones	"Wives and Lovers"
5	Sarah Brace	Prestwich	Bette Midler	"Miss Otis Regrets"

Episode 2 (18 March 2000)

Order	Contestant	From	Appeared as	Performing
1	Angela Browning	Gloucester	Billie	"Girlfriend"
2	David Clifford	Cheltenham	Morten Harket of A-ha	"Take On Me"
3	Lucinda O'Connell	Manchester	Natalie Imbruglia	"Big Mistake"
4	Rob Hughes	Prestatyn	David Bowie	"China Girl"
5	Karen Seaton-Emm	London	Joan Armatrading	"Drop the Pilot"

Episode 3 (25 March 2000)

Order	Contestant	From	Appeared as	Performing
1	Katrina Davi	Halifax	Tina Arena	"Whistle Down The Wind"
2	Dave Burley	Grimsby	Bryan Adams	"Summer of '69"
3	Gemma Campbell	Gateshead	Britney Spears	"...Baby One More Time"
4	Peter White	Birmingham	Kenny Rogers	"Daytime Friends"
5	Susie Ward-Joyce	Kent	Cyndi Lauper	"Girls Just Want to Have Fun"

Episode 4 (1 April 2000)

Order	Contestant	From	Appeared as	Performing
1	Richard Marsden	Sheffield	Joe Cocker	"You Are So Beautiful"
2	Sarah-Jane Tuson	Coventry	Lisa Stansfield	"All Woman"
3	Andrew Walker	Derbyshire	Barry Manilow	"Mandy"
4	Amy Rowlands	Salisbury	Louise	"Light of My Life"
5	Sara James	Abingdon	Karen Carpenter of The Carpenters	"Rainy Days and Mondays"

Episode 5 (8 April 2000)

Order	Contestant	From	Appeared as	Performing
1	Ronald Klarenbeck	Netherlands	Brian Connelly of Sweet	"Wig-Wam Bam"
2	Laura Dickinson	Tenterden	Lene Nystrøm of Aqua	"Turn Back Time"
3	Tony England	Dawlish	Frankie Valli of The Four Seasons	"Sherry"^{2}
4	Janine Hay	Haslingden	Alison Moyet	"Is This Love?"
5	Bernadetta Regan	Cork	Trisha Yearwood	"XXX's and OOO's (An American Girl)"

^{2} Performed twice on Stars in Their Eyes. The first was in the sixth episode of the fourth series.

Episode 6 (15 April 2000)

Order	Contestant	From	Appeared as	Performing
1	Raymond Fairhurst	Wrexham	Phil Oakey of The Human League	"Love Action (I Believe in Love)"
2	Katie Walters	Croydon	Kele Le Roc	"My Love"
3	Paul Harper	Pontefract	Gary Barlow of Take That	"Back for Good"
4	Mary Langford	Hampshire	Carol Decker of T'Pau	"China in Your Hand"
5	Nicole Jones	Flintshire	Jennifer Rush	"The Power of Love"^{3}

^{3} Performed three times on Stars in Their Eyes. The first was in the second episode of the second series, and the second was in the ninth episode of the fifth series.

Episode 7 (22 April 2000)

Order	Contestant	From	Appeared as	Performing
1	Lesley Stadden	Caerphilly	Bonnie Tyler	"Total Eclipse of the Heart"
2	Phil Miles	Pontypool	Jimmy Nail	"Crocodile Shoes"
3	Joan Osler	Wirral	Barbara Dickson	"January February"
4	John Southorn	Lemington	Paul Weller	"Wild Wood"
5	Mariana Gonzalez	Newport, Shropshire	Gloria Estefan	"Can't Stay Away from You"

Episode 8 (29 April 2000)

Order	Contestant	From	Appeared as	Performing
1	Claire-Louise Donlon	Ayr	Olivia Newton-John	"Xanadu"
2	Bob Baxter	Wirral	Roy Orbison	"You Got It"
3	Amy Alinmore	Cardiff	Jennifer Paige	"Crush"
4	Samantha Spencer	St. Helens	Tori Amos	"Cornflake Girl"
5	Gary Williamson	Merseyside	Tony Christie	"Is This the Way to Amarillo"^{2}

^{2} Performed twice on Stars in Their Eyes. The first was in the eighth episode of the sixth series.

Episode 9 (6 May 2000)

Order	Contestant	From	Appeared as	Performing
1	Jennifer Hogarth	Middlesbrough	Geri Halliwell	"Look at Me"
2	Thomas O'Donnell		Matt Monro	"Walk Away"
3	Caroline Bell	Cramlington	Doris Day	"Move Over Darling"
4	Gary Mullen	Barrhead	Freddie Mercury of Queen	"A Kind of Magic"
5	Debbie Hutchinson		Helen Reddy	"Angie Baby"^{3}

^{3} Performed three times on Stars in Their Eyes. The first was in the eighth episode of the fifth series, and the second was in the twelfth episode of the eighth series.

Episode 10 (13 May 2000)

Order	Contestant	From	Appeared as	Performing
1	Stephen Triffit	Windsor	Frank Sinatra	"Fly Me to the Moon"
2	Emanuela Giuliano	Wolverhampton	Martine McCutcheon	"Perfect Moment"
3	Paul Sutton	Wigan	Ronan Keating	"When You Say Nothing at All"
4	Zoe Luff		Cerys Matthews	"Dead From the Waist Down"
5	Maggie Blackaby		Barbra Streisand	"Don't Rain on My Parade"

==== Live Grand Final (20 May 2000) ====
- With special guests Ian Moor (performing as Chris De Burgh) and Chris de Burgh performing "The Lady in Red"

Order	Grand Finalist	Winner of Episode...	Appeared as	Performing	Total score...	Place
1	Annette Brown	1 (11 March 2000)	Whitney Houston	"It's Not Right, But It's Okay"	76,436	7th
2	David Clifford	2 (18 March 2000)	Morten Harket	"Take On Me"	91,913	5th
3	Katrina Davi	3 (25 March 2000)	Tina Arena	"Whistle Down The Wind"	91,000	6th
4	Sarah-Jane Tuson	4 (1 April 2000)	Lisa Stansfield	"All Woman"	38,061	10th
5	Tony England	5 (8 April 2000)	Frankie Valli	"Sherry"	382,976	3rd
6	Katie Walters	6 (15 April 2000)	Kele Le Roc	"My Love"	62,962	8th
7	Mariana Gonzalez	7 (22 April 2000)	Gloria Estefan	"Can't Stay Away From You"	40,768	9th
8	Amy Alinmore	8 (29 April 2000)	Jennifer Paige	"Crush"	143,972	4th
9	Gary Mullen	9 (6 May 2000)	Freddie Mercury	"A Kind of Magic"	864,838	1st
10	Stephen Triffit	10 (13 May 2000)	Frank Sinatra	"Fly Me to the Moon"	402,510	2nd

NOTE: This was the first live final to have 10 finalists to match the system from the Champion of Champions special, instead of 12 due to the number of episodes decreasing to 11 after 4 years.

Celebrity special (1 July 2000)

Order	Celebrity	From	Appeared as	Performing
1	Marc Bannerman	Dublin	Elvis Presley	"Suspicious Minds"
2	Trisha Goddard	London	Dionne Warwick	"Do You Know the Way to San Jose"
3	Mel Giedroyc and Sue Perkins	Various	Elaine Paige and Barbara Dickson	"I Know Him So Well"
4	Claire Sweeney	Walton	Celine Dion	"My Heart Will Go On"^{2}
5	Linford Christie	Acton	Ray Charles	"Take These Chains from My Heart"^{2}

^{2} Both Performed Twice on Stars in Their Eyes. The first for song number 4 was in the ninth episode and the grand final of the tenth series, and The first for song number 5 was in the first episode of the sixth series.

Celebrity special (16 September 2000)

Order	Celebrity	From	Appeared as	Performing
1	Rachel Hunter	Glenfield	Marilyn Monroe	"Diamonds Are a Girl's Best Friend"
2	Terry Venables	Dagenham	Anthony Newley	"What Kind of Fool Am I?"
3	Richard Standing	Ackworth	Gary Barlow of Take That	"Back for Good"
4	Julia Sawalha	Wandsworth	Cerys Matthews of Catatonia	"Road Rage"
5	Anne Diamond	Malvern	Sheena Easton	"For Your Eyes Only"

=== Series 12 ===
Episode 1 (23 September 2000)

Order	Contestant	From	Appeared as	Performing
1	Kirsten Blakeley	Ascot	Melanie C	"Goin' Down"
2	Tim Crone	Walsall	Jim Morrison of The Doors	"Light My Fire"
3	Lucy Jarrett	Plymouth	Bette Midler	"Wind Beneath My Wings"
4	Vincent Hughes	Manchester	Dion	"Runaround Sue"
5	Desreen Greet	London	Mary J. Blige	"Everything"

Episode 2 (30 September 2000)

Order	Contestant	From	Appeared as	Performing
1	Dave Dean	Hanham	Andy Williams	"Music to Watch Girls By"
2	Ophia Flash	Birmingham	Macy Gray	"I Try"
3	Stewart Cousins	Middlesbrough	Leo Sayer	"You Make Me Feel Like Dancing"
4	Danielle Nicholls	Oystermouth	Doris Day	"Secret Love"
5	Matthew Shaw	Cheshire	Meat Loaf	"You Took the Words Right Out of My Mouth"

Episode 3 (7 October 2000)

Order	Contestant	From	Appeared as	Performing
1	Kevin Beckett	Stockport	Ricky Martin	"Livin' la Vida Loca"
2	Fiona Harriott	West Midlands	Dionne Warwick	"Walk on By"
3	Tracey Shield	Coventry	Celine Dion	"It's All Coming Back to Me Now"
4	Scott Rumsby		Gerry Rafferty	"Baker Street"
5	Penny Scanlon		Carly Simon	"You're So Vain"

Episode 4 (14 October 2000)

Order	Contestant	From	Appeared as	Performing
1	Dawn Stafford	Nottingham	Shania Twain	"Man! I Feel Like a Woman!"
2	Darren Aldwinkle and Jason Ward	Hemel Hempstead	Simon & Garfunkel	"Mrs. Robinson"
3	Ann Arscott	Birmingham	Billie Holiday	"God Bless the Child"
4	Jonathan Eio	Isle of Man	Limahl of Kajagoogoo	"Too Shy"
5	Mark Cookson		Phil Collins	"In the Air Tonight"

NOTE: This episode was the first episode to feature a double-act since 1997.

Episode 5 (21 October 2000)

Order	Contestant	From	Appeared as	Performing
1	Peter Giles	West Hampstead	Harry Connick, Jr.	"It Had To Be You"
2	Kirsten Tomlinson	Kirriemuir	Julie Andrews	"The Sound of Music"
3	Ivan Mornington	Walsall	Tony Hadley of Spandau Ballet	"Through the Barricades"
4	Dinah Derby	Brixton	Gabrielle	"Dreams"^{2}
5	Tania Smith	North London	Edith Piaf	"La Vie en rose"

^{2} Performed twice on Stars in Their Eyes. The first was in the fifth episode of the fifth series.

Episode 6 (28 October 2000)

Order	Contestant	From	Appeared as	Performing
1	Adrian Crompton	Blackpool	Holly Johnson of Frankie Goes To Hollywood	"Two Tribes"
2	Patricia Simpson		Madonna	"Beautiful Stranger"
3	Jonathan Meyrick	Rochester	Reg Presley of The Troggs	"Wild Thing"
4	Beverley Simpson	Bradford	Nina Simone	"My Baby Just Cares for Me"
5	Louise Halliday	Bridgend	Kate Bush	"Babooshka"

Episode 7 (4 November 2000)

Order	Contestant	From	Appeared as	Performing
1	Patrice Taylor		Rosemary Clooney	"Mambo Italiano"
2	Phillip Probert		Robbie Williams	"She's the One"
3	Emma Whetton	Milton Keynes	Andrea Corr of The Corrs	"What Can I Do?"
4	Jeff Greenhalgh	Bolton	Paul McCartney of The Beatles	"Eleanor Rigby"
5	Tracey Wilson	West Yorkshire	Sally Oldfield	"Mirrors"

Episode 8 (11 November 2000)

Order	Contestant	From	Appeared as	Performing
1	Dave Miles		Robert Palmer	"Addicted to Love"
2	Michelle Marsh	Royton	Emma Bunton	"What I Am"
3	Audrey O'Connor	Nottingham	Gladys Knight	"Licence to Kill"
4	Guy Clover	St Mawes	Billy Fury	"Wondrous Place"
5	Chris Harvey	Thorne	Rod Stewart	"Maggie May"^{2}

^{2} Performed twice on Stars in Their Eyes. The first was in the fourth episode of the second series.

Episode 9 (18 November 2000)

Order	Contestant	From	Appeared as	Performing
1	Robert Cairns	West Midlands	Marc Bolan of T. Rex	"Hot Love"
2	Clara Mintah	Mitcham	Ella Fitzgerald	"Ev'ry Time We Say Goodbye"
3	Andrew Georgalli	Tottenham	Dean Martin	"Sway"
4	Amanda Taylor	Hull	Hazel O'Connor	"Eighth Day"
5	Joanne Vitta	Oldham	Sharleen Spiteri of Texas	"When We Are Together"

Episode 10 (25 November 2000)

Order	Contestant	From	Appeared as	Performing
1	Susan Burn	Newcastle Upon Tyne	Debbie Harry of Blondie	"Maria"
2	Simon Lees	Wolverhampton	Steven Tyler of Aerosmith	"I Don't Want to Miss a Thing"
3	Nicola Kirsch	Salisbury	Maria Callas	"O mio babbino caro"
4	Paul Stokes	Widnes	Michael McDonald of The Doobie Brothers	"What a Fool Believes"
5	Heath Ross	Chelmsford	Richard Ashcroft of The Verve	"Lucky Man"

==== Live Grand Final (2 December 2000) ====
- With special guest Gary Mullen as Freddie Mercury performing "I Want to Break Free"

Order	Grand Finalist	Winner of Episode...	Appeared as	Performing	Total score	Place
1	Vincent Hughes	1 (23 September 2000)	Dion	"Runaround Sue"	91,365	7th
2	Matthew Shaw	2 (30 September 2000)	Meat Loaf	"You Took the Words Right Out of My Mouth"	135,821	2nd
3	Tracey Shield	3 (7 October 2000)	Celine Dion	"It's All Coming Back To Me Now"	131,672	3rd
4	Darren Aldwinkle and Jason Ward	4 (14 October 2000)	Simon & Garfunkel	"Mrs. Robinson"	103,031	5th
5	Ivan Mornington	5 (21 October 2000)	Tony Hadley	"Through the Barricades"	65,235	10th
6	Louise Halliday	6 (28 October 2000)	Kate Bush	"Babooshka"	125,365	4th
7	Jeff Greenhalgh	7 (4 November 2000)	Paul McCartney	"Eleanor Rigby"	73,818	9th
8	Audrey O'Connor	8 (11 November 2000)	Gladys Knight	"Licence to Kill"	78,545	8th
9	Robert Cairns	9 (18 November 2000)	Marc Bolan	"Hot Love"	96,022	6th
10	Nicola Kirsch	10 (25 November 2000)	Maria Callas	"O mio babbino caro"	474,146	1st

NOTE: At the end of each finalists' performance, Matthew Kelly would present them with a gift (only if he had something to give them).

Christmas Special (26 December 2000)

Order	Former contestant	Who Appeared on Series...	Appeared as	Performing
1	Ian Hoor	10 (1999)	Noddy Holder of Slade	"Merry Xmas Everybody"
2	Annette Brown	11 (2000)	Whitney Houston	"I Will Always Love You"^{2}
3	Samia Stotes	10 (1999)	Mariah Carey	"All I Want for Christmas Is You"
4	Richard Carter	10 (1999)	George Michael of Wham!	"Last Christmas"
5	Paul Sutton and Phil Lawrence	Paul: 11 (2000) and Phil: 9 (1998)	Ronan Keating and Gary Barlow	"I Have a Dream"

^{2} Performed twice on Stars in Their Eyes. The first was in the fourth episode and the grand final of the fifth series.
NOTE: The only guests not to return were all the star guests from series 7, 8 & 12 (1996, 1997 & Autumn/Winter 2000), possibly because they were all unavailable.

== 2001 ==
=== European Championships (14 April 2001) ===
Order	Contestant	Representing...	Appeared as	Performing	Total score...	Place
1	Sylvana Djoemat	Netherlands	Patti LaBelle of Labelle	"Lady Marmalade"	56	2nd
2	Péter Kovács	Hungary	Tom Jones	"Sex Bomb"	6	8th
3	Gary Mullen	United Kingdom	Freddie Mercury of Queen	"A Kind of Magic"	56	2nd
4	Benedikte Narum	Norway	Joni Mitchell	"Big Yellow Taxi"	32	5th
5	Marco Neumann	Germany	Marti Pellow of Wet Wet Wet	"Love Is All Around"	16	7th
6	Katja Nord and Camilla Lowenberg	Sweden	Frida and Agnetha from ABBA	"Mamma Mia"	18	6th
7	Matteo Tarolla	Italy	Ricky Martin	"Livin' la Vida Loca"	6	8th
8	Sonny Oroir	Belgium	Celine Dion	"Because You Loved Me"	70	1st
9	Nadia Sousa	Portugal	Edith Piaf	"Escale"	36	4th
10	Ivonne, Patricia and Carol Ballinas	Spain	The Three Degrees	"When Will I See You Again"	4	10th

The judges were:

- Jo de Poorter (Netherlands)
- István Vágó (Hungary)
- Cheryl Baker (United Kingdom)
- Vibeke Strom (Norway)
- Nova Meierhenrich (Germany)
- Lea Kristensen (Sweden)
- Lorenzo Totaro (Italy)
- Kürt Rogiers (Belgium)
- Bárbara Guimarães (Portugal)
- Claudia G (Spain)

=== Series 13 ===
Episode 1 (5 May 2001)

Order	Contestant	From	Appeared as	Performing
1	Debralee Burns	Tooting	Gloria Gaynor	"I Will Survive"
2	Tony Price	Portsmouth	Sting of The Police	"Every Breath You Take"
3	Inez Stuart	Nottingham	Christina Aguilera	"Genie in a Bottle"
4	Robert Scott	Ayrshire	Frank Sinatra	"The Lady Is a Tramp"
5	Carl Conlon	Manchester	Johnny Moore of The Drifters	"Saturday Night at The Movies"

Episode 2 (12 May 2001)

Order	Contestant	From	Appeared as	Performing
1	Rachel Scott		Joan Jett	"I Love Rock 'n' Roll"
2	Tony Perry	South Benfleet	David Bowie	"Ashes to Ashes"
3	Mark Taylor		Smokey Robinson of Smokey Robinson & the Miracles	"The Tears of a Clown"
4	Donna Atkinson		Lynn Anderson	"Rose Garden"
5	Barry Sellers	Ripon	Eric Clapton	"Wonderful Tonight"

Episode 3 (19 May 2001)

Order	Contestant	From	Appeared as	Performing
1	Sarah Irlam	Crewe	Kylie Minogue	"Better the Devil You Know"
2	Jeremy Bailey	Nuneaton	Dave Gahan of Depeche Mode	"Just Can't Get Enough"
3	Lisa McQuillan	Bournemouth	Julie London	"Cry Me A River"
4	Martin Lucas	Dartington	Cliff Richard	"Miss You Nights"
5	Alex May		Axl Rose	"Sweet Child o' Mine"

Episode 4 (26 May 2001)

Order	Contestant	From	Appeared as	Performing
1	Lorraine Malone		Shania Twain	"That Don't Impress Me Much"
2	Eddie Cunningham	Glasgow	Jim Diamond	"I Should Have Known Better"
3	Tracy Roma	Middlesex	Sade of Sade	"Smooth Operator"
4	John Verity	Yorkshire	Johnny Cash	"Ring of Fire"
5	Paul Lewis		Darren Hayes of Savage Garden	"Truly, Madly, Deeply"

Episode 5 (2 June 2001)

Order	Contestant	From	Appeared as	Performing
1	Paul Shilling	Bexleyheath	Boy George of Culture Club	"Do You Really Want to Hurt Me"
2	Tony Rodgers	Bradford	Ray Davies of The Kinks	"Sunny Afternoon"
3	Joseph Hall	Nottingham	Sisqó	"Thong Song"
4	Joanne MacMillan	Norwich	Alison Moyet of Yazoo	"Don't Go"
5	Karen Virgo	London	Aretha Franklin	"Respect"

Episode 6 (9 June 2001)

Order	Contestant	From	Appeared as	Performing
1	Steve Wild		Robbie Williams	"Rock DJ"
2	Steve Hurrell	Blackpool	Bryan Ferry of Roxy Music	"Jealous Guy"
3	Leanne Bevan	Gowerton	Madonna	"American Pie"
4	Dalton Harvey	Wolverhampton	Lionel Richie of Commodores	"Three Times a Lady"
5	Paul Waldron	Reddish	Anthony Newley	"Why"

Episode 7 (16 June 2001)

Order	Contestant	From	Appeared as	Performing
1	Nicola Ward	Surrey	Britney Spears	"Oops!... I Did It Again"
2	Clinton Boland	Cambridge	James Taylor	"You've Got a Friend"
3	Tony Bodnar	Kent	Elvis Costello	"Watching the Detectives"
4	Lisa Morgan	Bristol	Alanis Morissette	"Thank U"
5	Annie Shepherd	High Wycombe	Judith Durham of The Seekers	"Georgy Girl"

Episode 8 (23 June 2001)

Order	Contestant	From	Appeared as	Performing
1	Teresa Butler	Essex	Louise	"2 Faced"
2	Dave Davidson	Huddersfield	Bob Marley of Bob Marley and the Wailers	"Is This Love"
3	Tony Scott	Skelmersdale	Fran Healy of Travis	"Why Does It Always Rain on Me?"
4	Reuben Richards	Royal Tunbridge Wells	Wilson Pickett	"In the Midnight Hour"
5	Heidi Moulinie	Bexley	Liza Minnelli	"Maybe This Time"

Episode 9 (30 June 2001)

Order	Contestant	From	Appeared as	Performing
1	Chris Park	Newcastle upon Tyne	Adam Ant of Adam and the Ants	"Prince Charming"
2	Jane Moon		Dolly Parton	"Jolene"
3	Belinda O'Hooley	Leeds	Annie Lennox	"Why"
4	Russell Mills		Wayne Fontana of Wayne Fontana and the Mindbenders	"The Game of Love"
5	Richard McMullen	Middlesbrough	Craig David	"7 Days"

Episode 10 (7 July 2001)

Order	Contestant	From	Appeared as	Performing
1	Jo Lloyd-Hughes	Wrexham	Róisín Murphy of Moloko	"Sing It Back"
2	John Scarlett	Blackpool	Charles Aznavour	"She"
3	Pamela Howell		Toni Braxton	"Un-Break My Heart"
4	Emma Wilkinson	Warwickshire	Dusty Springfield	"Son of a Preacher Man"
5	Gary Setterfield	Leicester	Elton John	"Your Song"

==== Live Grand Final (14 July 2001) ====
- With special guest Nicola Kirsch as Maria Callas performing "O mio babbino caro"

Order	Grand Finalist	Winner of Episode...	Appeared as	Performing	Total score	Place
1	Debralee Burns	1 (5 May 2001)	Gloria Gaynor	"I Will Survive"	37,592	9th
2	Tony Perry	2 (12 May 2001)	David Bowie	"Ashes to Ashes"	35,132	10th
3	Sarah Irlam	3 (19 May 2001)	Kylie Minogue	"Better The Devil You Know"	50,770	8th
4	Eddie Cunningham	4 (26 May 2001)	Jim Diamond	"I Should Have Known Better"	69,309	4th
5	Karen Virgo	5 (2 June 2001)	Aretha Franklin	"Respect"	54,424	7th
6	Dalton Harvey	6 (9 June 2001)	Lionel Richie	"Three Times A Lady"	123,159	3rd
7	Annie Shepherd	7 (16 June 2001)	Judith Durham	"Georgy Girl"	55,163	6th
8	David Davidson	8 (23 June 2001)	Bob Marley	"Is This Love"	160,957	2nd
9	Belinda O'Hooley	9 (30 June 2001)	Annie Lennox	"Why"	67,138	5th
10	Emma Wilkinson	10 (7 July 2001)	Dusty Springfield	"Son of a Preacher Man"	204,970	1st

Popstars special (6 October 2001)

Order	Celebrity	From	Appeared as	Performing
1	Sonique	North London	Donna Summer	"Hot Stuff"
2	A1	Various	The Beatles	"Help!"
3	Belinda Carlisle	Los Angeles	Connie Francis	"Lipstick on Your Collar"
4	Claire Richards	Hillingdon	Karen Carpenter of The Carpenters	"Superstar"
5	Boy George	Barnehurst	David Bowie	"Starman"

Coronation Street special (24 November 2001)

Order	Celebrity	From	Appeared as	Performing
1	Suranne Jones	Middleton	Madonna	"Music"
2	Charles Dale	Tenby	Joe Cocker	"With a Little Help from My Friends"^{2}
3	Vicky Entwistle	Accrington	Björk	"It's Oh So Quiet"^{2}
4	Scott Wright	Greater Manchester	George Michael	"Careless Whisper"^{2}
5	Liz Dawn	Leeds	Peggy Lee	"I Can't Give You Anything but Love, Baby"

^{2} All Performed twice on Stars in Their Eyes. The first for song number 2 was in the first episode of the fourth series, the first for song number 3 was in the third episode of the eighth series, and the first for song number 4 was in the second episode of the second series. Song number 2 was also performed once by Various Artists including John Finch as Marti Pellow of Wet Wet Wet in the winners special episode broadcast on Christmas Eve 1994.

Christmas special (25 December 2001)

Order	Former contestant	Who Appeared on Series...	Appeared as	Performing
1	Robert Lewis	6 (1995)	Shakin' Stevens	"Merry Christmas Everyone"
2	Yvonne Milligan	9 (1998)	Karen Carpenter of The Carpenters	"Merry Christmas Darling"
3	Dave Dean	12 (2000)	Andy Williams	"Let It Snow! Let It Snow! Let It Snow!"
4	Debralee Burns and Karen Virgo	13 (2001)	Gloria Gaynor & Aretha Franklin	"It's Raining Men"
5	Jeff Greenhalgh	12 (2000)	Paul McCartney of Paul McCartney and Wings	"Mull of Kintyre"

NOTE: The only guests not to return were all the star guests from series 7 & 8 (1996 & 1997), possibly because they were all unavailable. This episode was also the last non-celebrity Christmas Special Episode.

== 2002 ==
=== Series 14 ===
Episode 1 (16 February 2002)

Order	Contestant	From	Appeared as	Performing
1	Justine Riddoch		Anastacia	"I'm Outta Love"
2	Chris Brockman		Bruce Springsteen	"Dancing In The Dark"
3	Phil Cole		Peter Skellern	"You're a Lady"
4	Danielle Spitteri		Brenda Lee	"I'm Sorry"
5	Jon Terzza		Tim Booth of James	"Sit Down"

Episode 2 (23 February 2002)

Order	Contestant	From	Appeared as	Performing
1	Wayne Dilks		George Michael	"Outside"
2	Mike Powell		Scott Walker of The Walker Brothers	"The Sun Ain't Gonna Shine (Anymore)"
3	Jackie Pottinger		Candi Staton	"Young Hearts Run Free"
4	James Bell		Michael Stipe of R.E.M.	"Man on the Moon"
5	Laura Pelling		Carole King	"It Might as Well Rain Until September"

Episode 3 (2 March 2002)

Order	Contestant	From	Appeared as	Performing
1	Derek Finnie		Bob Geldof	"I Don't Like Mondays"
2	Nicole Smith		Barbra Streisand	"People"
3	Rachel Mason		Sandie Shaw	"Puppet on a String"
4	Charlotte Grimes		Cerys Matthews of Catatonia	"Mulder and Scully"
5	Colin Mills		Billy Ocean	"Love Really Hurts Without You"

Episode 4 (9 March 2002)

Order	Contestant	From	Appeared as	Performing
1	Marianne Harney		Yazz of Yazz and the Plastic Population	"The Only Way Is Up"
2	Mike Field		John Lennon	"Imagine"
3	James Taylor		Shane Filan of Westlife	"Fool Again"
4	Cecil Foster		Luther Vandross	"Never Too Much"^{3}
5	Lianna Tabbalt		Susan Maughan	"Bobby's Girl"

^{3} Performed three times on Stars in Their Eyes. The first was in the Favourites Special episode broadcast the week before the start of fifth series, and the second was in the second episode of the ninth series.

Episode 5 (16 March 2002)

Order	Contestant	From	Appeared as	Performing
1	Jennifer Moss		Betty Boo	"Where Are You Baby?"
2	Katie Berker		Mama Cass	"Dream a Little Dream of Me"
3	Kevin Keeler		David Cassidy of The Partridge Family	"I Think I Love You"
4	Paul Fearns		Paul Weller of The Jam	"Going Underground"
5	Timothy Lee		Chris Martin of Coldplay	"Yellow"

Episode 6 (23 March 2002)

Order	Contestant	From	Appeared as	Performing
1	Tony Scarth		Tom Jones	"What's New Pussycat?"
2	Robbie Hague		Nick Heyward of Haircut One Hundred	"Love Plus One"
3	Kerrie Southwart		Kim Wilde	"Kids in America"
4	Gary Bayley		Robbie Williams	"Angels"
5	Lee Rose		James Dean Bradfield	"You Stole the Sun from My Heart"

Episode 7 (30 March 2002)

Order	Contestant	From	Appeared as	Performing
1	Alan Cleland		Alvin Stardust	"My Coo Ca Choo"
2	Claudette Nelson		Heather Small of M People	"One Night in Heaven"
3	Louise Porter		Clare Grogan of Altered Images	"I Could Be Happy"
4	Paul Collier		Bono of U2	"Beautiful Day"
5	Debbie Meldrum		Debbie Harry of Blondie	"Hanging on the Telephone"

Episode 8 (6 April 2002)

Order	Contestant	From	Appeared as	Performing
1	Angie Maddick		Suzi Quatro	"Devil Gate Drive"
2	Pete East		Peter Sarstedt	"Where Do You Go To (My Lovely)?"
3	Pamela Gilmore		Geri Halliwell	"Lift Me Up"
4	George Dixon		Ray Charles	"I Can't Stop Loving You"
5	David O'Toole		Noel Gallagher of Oasis	"Don't Look Back in Anger"

Episode 9 (13 April 2002)

Order	Contestant	From	Appeared as	Performing
1	Jenny Ormondroyd		Claire Richards of Steps	"One for Sorrow"
2	Ian Higgins		Jon Bon Jovi	"It's My Life"
3	Stewart Duff		Elvis Presley	"Are You Lonesome Tonight?"
4	Lisa Hewson		Leigh Nash of Sixpence None the Richer	"Kiss Me"
5	Denise Davidson		Tracy Chapman	"Baby Can I Hold You"^{1}

^{1} Performed twice on Stars in Their Eyes but once by another act. The first performance of the same song was performed by Ian Boyd as Ronan Keating of Boyzone in the fourth episode and the grand final of the tenth series.

Episode 10 (20 April 2002)

Order	Contestant	From	Appeared as	Performing
1	Rebecca O'Connor		Tina Turner	"The Best"
2	Shirley Awan		Dana	"All Kinds of Everything"
3	Nicky Pennells		Ronan Keating	"When You Say Nothing at All"
4	Emma Clout		Mitzi Gaynor	"I'm Gonna Wash That Man Right Outa My Hair" from South Pacific
5	Lana Keough		Tiffany	"I Think We're Alone Now"

==== Live Grand Final (27 April 2002) ====
- With special guest Emma Wilkinson as Dusty Springfield performing "Son of a Preacher Man"

Order	Grand Finalist	Winner of Episode...	Appeared as	Performing	Total score	Place
1	Justine Riddoch	1 (16 February 2002)	Anastacia	"I'm Outta Love"	67,212	6th
2	Mike Powell	2 (23 February 2002)	Scott Walker	"The Sun Ain't Gonna Shine (Anymore)"	74,445	5th
3	Charlotte Grimes	3 (2 March 2002)	Cerys Matthews	"Mulder and Scully"	22,364	10th
4	Cecil Foster	4 (9 March 2002)	Luther Vandross	"Never Too Much"	87,487	3rd
5	Kevin Keeler	5 (16 March 2002)	David Cassidy	"I Think I Love You"	41,740	8th
6	Gary Bayley	6 (23 March 2002)	Robbie Williams	"Angels"	83,302	4th
7	Claudette Nelson	7 (30 March 2002)	Heather Small	"One Night in Heaven"	51,871	7th
8	David O'Toole	8 (6 April 2002)	Noel Gallagher	"Don't Look Back In Anger"	37,338	9th
9	Stewart Duff	9 (13 April 2002)	Elvis Presley	"Are You Lonesome Tonight?"	240,731	1st
10	Rebecca O'Connor	10 (20 April 2002)	Tina Turner	"The Best"	230,115	2nd

Celebrity divas Special (4 May 2002)

Order	Celebrity	From	Appeared as	Performing
1	Debra Stephenson	Hull	Kylie Minogue	"Can't Get You Out of My Head"
2	Sally Lindsay	Stockport	Dolly Parton	"Here You Come Again"
3	Gabby Logan	Leeds	Sharleen Spiteri of Texas	"Say What You Want"^{2}
4	Lisa Riley	Bury	Stockard Channing	"There Are Worse Things I Could Do" from Grease^{2}
5	Esther Rantzen	Berkhamsted	Edith Piaf	"La Vie en Rose"

^{2} Both Performed twice on Stars in Their Eyes. The first for song number 3 was in the eighth episode of the tenth series, and The first for song number 4 was in the fourth episode of the seventh series.

Coronation Street special (11 May 2002)

Order	Celebrity	From	Appeared as	Performing
1	Jennifer James	Wigan	Shania Twain	"That Don't Impress Me Much"
2	Kevin Kennedy	Manchester	Bryan Adams	"Heaven"
3	Nikki Sanderson	Blackpool	LeAnn Rimes	"Can't Fight the Moonlight"
4	Bruce Jones	Collyhurst	Dean Martin	"Little Ole Wine Drinker Me"
5	Sue Cleaver	Watford	Judith Durham of The Seekers	"Georgy Girl"

Popstars special (17 August 2002)

Order	Celebrity	From	Appeared as	Performing
1	Honeyz	Hammersmith	The Supremes	"Baby Love"
2	Jarvis Cocker	Sheffield	Rolf Harris	"Two Little Boys"^{2}
3	Kim Wilde	Middlesex	Doris Day	"Que Sera, Sera"^{2}
4	Brian Harvey	Walthamstow	Ali Campbell of UB40	"Kingston Town"^{2}
5	AllSTARS*	Various	Steps	"Heartbeat"

^{2} All Performed Twice on Stars in Their Eyes. The first for song number 2 was in the fifth episode of the sixth series, The first for song number 3 was in the first episode of the ninth series and The first for song number 4 was in the eighth episode of the fifth series.

=== Junior series 1 (2001 – Pilot) / (2002 – Rest of Series) ===
Pilot/Episode 1 (21 July 2001, repeated 24 August 2002)

Order	Contestant	Age	From	Appeared as	Performing
1	Leanne Fielder	14	Southampton	LeAnn Rimes	"How Do I Live"^{2}
2	Lewis Devine	13	Southport	Donny Osmond	"Puppy Love"
3	Danielle Solly, Jodie Smith and Tara Smith	Danielle: 13, Jodie: 14 and Tara: 11	Streatham	Cleopatra	"Cleopatra's Theme"
4	Alyn Hawke	12	Bridgend	Aled Jones	"Walking in the Air"
5	Joanna Haden	12	Edinburgh	Helen Shapiro	"Walkin' Back to Happiness"^{3}

^{2} Performed twice on Stars in Their Eyes. The first for song number 1 was in the sixth episode of the tenth series.
^{3} Performed three times on Stars in Their Eyes. first for song number 5 was in the ninth episode of the fourth series, and the second for song number 5 was in the eleventh episode of the ninth series.

Episode 2 (31 August 2002)

Order	Contestant	Age	From	Appeared as	Performing
1	Sarah Donald	14	Mauchline	Jennifer Lopez	"Love Don't Cost A Thing"
2	Charlotte Gethin	14	Cannock	Eva Cassidy	"Over the Rainbow"^{1}
3	Aston Merrygold	14	Peterborough	Michael Jackson	"Rockin' Robin"
4	Vicky Nolan	15	Poynton	Tina Arena	"Whistle Down The Wind"^{2}
5	Alicia Brady	11	Huddersfield	Lena Zavaroni	"Ma! He's Making Eyes at Me"

^{1} Performed twice on Stars in Their Eyes but once by another act. The first performance of the same song was performed by Charla Dee as Judy Garland in the sixth episode of the fifth series.
^{2} Performed twice on Stars in Their Eyes. The first was in the third episode and the grand final of the eleventh series.

Episode 3 (7 September 2002)

Order	Contestant	Age	From	Appeared as	Performing
1	Gemma and Nicola Hawkins	Gemma: 15 and Nicola: 14	Hornchurch	Frida and Agnetha from ABBA	"Waterloo"
2	Kevin Bates	16	Birmingham	Ronan Keating	"Life Is a Rollercoaster"
3	Louise Emmanuel	16	Westcliff-on-Sea	Irene Cara	"Fame"
4	Sam Rabbitt	12	Newport	Mark Lester	"Where Is Love?"
5	Kim Hillyard	16	Totton	Martine McCutcheon	"Perfect Moment"^{2}

^{2} Performed twice on Stars in Their Eyes. The first was in the tenth episode of the eleventh series.

Episode 4 (14 September 2002)

Order	Contestant	Age	From	Appeared as	Performing
1	Amanda Tinkler	16	Crosby Garrett	Nelly Furtado	"I'm Like a Bird"
2	Amber Griffiths	11	Swansea	Aileen Quinn	"Tomorrow"
3	Lee Martin	16	Hornchurch	Ritchie Valens	"La Bamba"^{2}
4	Alison Seal	14	Hatfield	Charlotte Church	"Pie Jesu"
5	Sally Waterhouse	15	Wallasey	Lulu	"Shout"^{2}

^{2} Both performed twice on Stars in Their Eyes. The first for song number 3 was in fifth episode of the sixth series, and the first for song number 5 was in the fourth episode of the fourth series.

Episode 5 (21 September 2002)

Order	Contestant	Age	From	Appeared as	Performing
1	Amie-Rose Sinclair	15	Wickford	Britney Spears	"Sometimes"
2	Porsha Mavour	9	Anerley	Millie Small	"My Boy Lollipop"
3	Dan Watson, James Rees, Chris Deeley and Paul Edwards	Dan: 14, James: 15, Chris: 15 and Paul: 15	Stourbridge	The Monkees	"I'm a Believer"
4	Naomi Lowe	15	Sunderland	Kylie Minogue	"I Should Be So Lucky"
5	Darren Sawdon	12	Grimsby	Jimmy Osmond	"Long Haired Lover from Liverpool"^{2}

^{2} Performed twice on Stars in Their Eyes. The first was in the eighth episode of the sixth series.

Episode 6 (28 September 2002)

Order	Contestant	Age	From	Appeared as	Performing
1	Russell Parsons	16	Salisbury	Robbie Williams	"Let Me Entertain You"^{2}
2	Daisy Chute	13	Edinburgh	Judy Garland	"You Made Me Love You"
3	Lauren Commons	16	Dewsbury	Jo O'Meara of S Club 7	"Have You Ever"
4	Kate Richardson	15	Tamworth	Lisa Loeb	"Stay (I Missed You)"^{2}
5	James Holman	16	Cheshire	Billy Joel	"Uptown Girl"

^{2} Both performed twice on Stars in Their Eyes. The first for song number 1 was in the ? episode of the ? series, and the first for song number 4 was in the third episode of the seventh series.

==== Live Grand Final (5 October 2002) ====
Order	Grand Finalist	Age	Winner of Episode...	Appeared as	Performing	Total score	Place
1	Lewis Devine	14	1 (21 July 2001)	Donny Osmond	"The Twelfth of Never"	35,411	5th
2	Louise Emmanuel	16	3 (7 September 2002)	Irene Cara	"Fame"	25,096	6th
3	Charlotte Gethin	14	2 (31 August 2002)	Eva Cassidy	"Over the Rainbow"	282,422	1st
4	Porsha Mavour	10	5 (21 September 2002)	Millie Small	"My Boy Lollipop"	79,674	3rd
5	Amanda Tinkler	16	4 (14 September 2002)	Nelly Furtado	"I'm Like A Bird"	55,638	4th
6	Russell Parsons	16	6 (28 September 2002)	Robbie Williams	"Let Me Entertain You"	142,887	2nd

European Championships 2

The judges were:

- Agneta Sjödin (Sweden)
- Bruno Sokolowicz (Spain)
- Kari Hansmark (Norway)
- Ellen Hidding (Italy)
- Louis Walsh (Ireland)
- Seth Kamphuijs (Netherlands)
- Claire Sweeney (United Kingdom)
- Catarina Furtado (Portugal)
- Sonny Oroir (Belgium)
- Mousse T. (Germany)

Part 1 (26 October 2002)

Order	Contestant	Representing...	Appeared as	Performing	Total score...	Place
1	Mirna Tutnjevic	Sweden	Britney Spears	"Overprotected"	63	7th
2	María Luísa Fernades	Spain	Bonnie Tyler	"Total Eclipse of the Heart"	80	Joint 3rd
3	Ronny Inderberg	Norway	Garth Brooks	"Callin' Baton Rouge"	61	8th
4	Walter, Davide and Pasquale Egiziano	Italy	The Bee Gees	"Stayin' Alive"	81	2nd
5	Rebecca O'Connor	Ireland	Tina Turner	"The Best"	89	1st

Part 2 (2 November 2002)

Order	Contestant	Representing...	Appeared as	Performing	Total score...	Place
6	Shanella James	Netherlands	Mary J. Blige	"Family Affair"	78	5th
7	Stewart Duff	United Kingdom	Elvis Presley	"Are You Lonesome Tonight?"	73	6th
8	Yolanda	Portugal	Shania Twain	"That Don't Impress Me Much"	51	10th
9	Fernando Espeso Calvo	Belgium	Julio Iglesias	"Begin the Beguine"	80	Joint 3rd
10	Guido Westermann	Germany	Jon Bon Jovi	"It's My Life"	58	9th

Celebrity Christmas special (28 December 2002)

Order	Celebrity	From	Appeared as	Performing
1	Caprice	Hacienda Heights, California	Nancy Sinatra	"These Boots Are Made for Walking"
2	Frank Skinner	West Bromwich	Johnnie Ray	"Cry"
3	Kim Wilde	Chiswick	Carly Simon	"Nobody Does It Better"
4	Boy George	Barnehurst	David Bowie	"Sorrow"
5	Tracy Shaw	Belper	Pink	"Get the Party Started"

== 2003 ==
Legends special (1 February 2003)

Order	Celebrity	From	Appeared as	Performing
1	Jane Danson	Bury	Madonna	"Frozen"^{2}
2	Tony Blackburn	Guildford	Cliff Richard	"Living Doll"
3	Rhona Cameron	Dundee	Judy Garland	"The Man That Got Away"
4	Ron Atkinson	Liverpool	Frank Sinatra	"That's Life"
5	Julie Goodyear	Heywood	Marlene Dietrich	"Falling in Love Again (Can't Help It)"

^{2} Performed twice on Stars in Their Eyes. The first was in the seventh episode of the tenth series.

Coronation Street special (8 February 2003)

Order	Celebrity	From	Appeared as	Performing
1	Samia Ghadie	Eccles	Holly Valance	"Kiss Kiss"
2	Andy Whyment	Salford	Don Henley of The Eagles	"Desperado"
3	Shobna Gulati	Oldham	Diana Ross	"Upside Down"
4	Bruno Langley	Taunton	Robbie Williams	"Eternity"
5	Lucy-Jo Hudson	West Yorkshire	Kelly Osbourne	"Papa Don't Preach"

Soapstars special (22 February 2003)

Order	Celebrity	From	Appeared as	Performing
1	Bernie Nolan	Blackpool	Anastacia	"Not That Kind"
2	Tony Audenshaw and Deena Payne	Various	Kenny Rogers and Dolly Parton	"Islands In The Stream"
3	William Roache	Nottingham	Perry Como	"Catch a Falling Star"
4	Sammy Winward	Bolton	Christina Aguilera	"What A Girl Wants"
5	Lesley Joseph	Haringey	Ethel Merman	"There's No Business Like Show Business"

=== Junior series 2 ===
Episode 1 (5 April 2003)

Order	Contestant	Age	From	Appeared as	Performing
1	Ayla Pope	12	Yeovil	Sophie Ellis-Bextor	"Murder on the Dancefloor"
2	Natasha Bennett	12	Dudley	Karen Carpenter	"We've Only Just Begun"
3	Andrew Brown, James Smith, Jon Birch and Paul Jones	Andrew: 15, James: 16, Jon: 15 and Paul: 15	Liverpool	The Beatles	"Please Please Me"
4	Jaclyn Bell	16	Barrhead	Kate Bush	"Wuthering Heights"^{3}
5	Katherine Hannible	13	Chester	Avril Lavigne	"Complicated"

^{3} Performed three times on Stars in Their Eyes. The first was in the first episode of the fifth series, and the second was in seventh episode of the ninth series.

Episode 2 (12 April 2003)

Order	Contestant	Age	From	Appeared as	Performing
1	Lucy Moppett	15	Norwich	Kylie Minogue	"In Your Eyes"
2	Louis Hartshorn	14	Manchester	Neil Hannon of The Divine Comedy	"National Express"
3	Jessica Stretton	12	Chesterfield	Marie Osmond	"Paper Roses"
4	Megan Hobbs	15	Luton	Keavy Lynch	"Blame It on the Weatherman"
5	James Kirby	16	Margate	Tony Hadley	"Gold"^{4}

^{4} Performed four times on Stars in Their Eyes. The first was in the third episode of the second series, the second was in the fourth episode of the eighth series, and the third was in the first celebrity special episode.

Episode 3 (19 April 2003)

Order	Contestant	Age	From	Appeared as	Performing
1	Sasha Woodhead	13	Huddersfield	Britney Spears	"Overprotected"
2	Laurie-Ann Caddis	15	Kilmarnock	Mama Cass	"Dream a Little Dream of Me"
3	Kai Taylor	11	Barnsley	Daniel Bedingfield	"Gotta Get Thru This"
4	Rachel Coulter	16	County Down	Julianne Regan	"Martha's Harbour"
5	Nicholas Fuller	13	Manchester	George Formby	"When I'm Cleaning Windows"^{2}

^{2} Performed twice on Stars in Their Eyes. The first was in the fourth episode of the fifth series.

Episode 4 (26 April 2003)

Order	Contestant	Age	From	Appeared as	Performing
1	Gareth Daly	16	Cheshire	Justin Timberlake	"Like I Love You"
2	Sarah Jenkinson	15	Sheffield	Sandie Shaw	"(There's) Always Something There to Remind Me"
3	Dominique Savage-Ramsey	16	Wolverhampton	Alicia Keys	"A Woman's Worth"
4	Charlotte Reid	14	Sunderland	Björk	"It's Oh So Quiet"^{3}
5	Jenny Powell	14	Walton-on-Thames	Mary Hopkin	"Those Were the Days"

^{3} Performed three times on Stars in Their Eyes. The first was in the third episode of the eighth series, and the second was in the first Coronation Street special episode.

Episode 5 (3 May 2003)

Order	Contestant	Age	From	Appeared as	Performing
1	Anthony Hannah	14	Liverpool	Robbie Williams	"Rock DJ"
2	Lhamea Lall	15	Erdington	Ms. Dynamite	"Dy-Na-Mi-Tee"
3	Laura Sharley	11	Weymouth	Sarah Brightman	"Wishing You Were Somehow Here Again"
4	Lance Vernon	16	Exmouth	Ronan Keating	"If Tomorrow Never Comes"^{1}
5	Rebecca Leaves	13	Middlesex	Dolly Parton	"Here You Come Again"^{2}

^{1} Performed twice on Stars in Their Eyes but once with another act. The first performance of the same song was by Thomas Gillespie as Garth Brooks in the eighth episode of the eighth series.
^{2} Performed twice on Stars in Their Eyes. The first for song number 5 was in the celebrity divas special episode.

Episode 6 (10 May 2003)

Order	Contestant	Age	From	Appeared as	Performing
1	Ashley McCullagh	15	Glasgow	Shania Twain	"You're Still the One"^{2}
2	Stefanie Laurence	15		Cher	"Believe"
3	Rebecca Paul	16	Durrington	Alanis Morissette	"Hand in My Pocket"
4	Duke Christopher	15	Aberystwyth	Jerry Lee Lewis	"Great Balls of Fire"
5	Wreh Asha Walton	16	Nottingham	Mary J. Blige	"Family Affair"

^{2} Performed twice on Stars in Their Eyes. The first was in the eleventh episode of the tenth series.

Episode 7 (17 May 2003)

Order	Contestant	Age	From	Appeared as	Performing
1	Vanessa White	13	West London	Beyoncé Knowles	"Work It Out"
2	Laura Jenkins	12	Liverpool	Connie Francis	"Where the Boys Are"
3	Jamie Ephraim	14	London	Craig David	"Walking Away"
4	Ruth Savill	16	Lyndhurst	Crystal Gayle	"Don't It Make My Brown Eyes Blue"^{2}
5	Cassie Spinks	16	Blackpool	Olivia Newton-John	"Xanadu"

^{2} Performed twice on Stars in Their Eyes. The first was in the second episode of the fourth series.

Episode 8 (24 May 2003)

Order	Contestant	Age	From	Appeared as	Performing
1	Elicia Jones	13	Merthyr Tydfil	Billie Piper	"Because We Want To"
2	Rebecca Gleeson	13	Dublin	Dido	"Thank You"
3	Jessica Holman	12	Stockport	Mary Weiss	"Leader of the Pack"^{1}
4	Connor Daley	14	West London	Usher	"U Got It Bad"
5	Amy Cherry	16	Stockton-on-Tees	Jacqui Abbott	"Rotterdam"^{2}

^{1} Performed twice on Stars in Their Eyes but once with another act. The first performance of the same song was by Steve Edward as Julian Clary in the second episode of the eighth series.
^{2} Performed twice on Stars in Their Eyes. The first was in the twelfth episode of the ninth series.

==== Live Grand Final (31 May 2003) ====
Order	Grand Finalist	Age	Winner of Episode...	Appeared as	Performing	Total score	Place
1	Lucy Moppett	16	2 (12 April 2003)	Kylie Minogue	"In Your Eyes"	12,716	9th
2	Ashley McCullagh	16	6 (10 May 2003)	Shania Twain	"You're Still The One"	51,990	5th
3	Kai Taylor	11	3 (19 April 2003)	Daniel Bedingfield	"Gotta Get Thru This"	54,861	4th
4	Rebecca Gleeson	13	8 (24 May 2003)	Dido	"Thank You"	19,961	8th
5	Laura Jenkins	12	7 (17 May 2003)	Connie Francis	"Where the Boys Are"	156,455	1st
6	James Kirby	16	2 (12 April 2003) (Wildcard winner)	Tony Hadley	"Gold"	27,086	7th
7	Jaclyn Bell	16	1 (5 April 2003)	Kate Bush	"Wuthering Heights"	77,745	3rd
8	Charlotte Reid	14	4 (26 April 2003)	Björk	"It's Oh So Quiet"	42,245	6th
9	Lance Vernon	16	5 (3 May 2003)	Ronan Keating	"If Tomorrow Never Comes"	111,248	2nd

I'm A Celebrity...Get Me Out of Here! special (16 August 2003)

Order	Celebrity	From	Appeared as	Performing
1	Toyah Willcox	Kings Heath	Patti Smith of Patti Smith Group	"Because the Night"
2	John Fashanu	Kensington	Otis Redding	"(Sittin' On) The Dock of the Bay"^{2}
3	Siân Lloyd	Maesteg	Deborah Strickland of The Flying Lizards	"Money (That's What I Want)"
4	Uri Geller	Tel Aviv	Charles Aznavour	"She"
5	Catalina Guirado	Auckland	Debbie Harry of Blondie	"Sunday Girl"

^{2} Performed twice on Stars in Their Eyes. The first was in the eighth episode and the grand final of the eighth series.

Soapstars special (23 August 2003)

Order	Celebrity	From	Appeared as	Performing
1	Jonathan Wrather	Manchester	Harry Connick, Jr.	"We Are In Love"
2	Emily Symons	Sydney	Rosemary Clooney	"Mambo Italiano"^{2}
3	Richard Fleeshman	Wilmslow	Will Young	"Evergreen"
4	Suranne Jones	Middleton	Catherine Zeta-Jones	"All That Jazz"
5	David Neilson	Loughborough	Roy Orbison	"You Got It"^{2}

^{2} Both performed twice on Stars in Their Eyes. The first for song number 2 was in the seventh episode of the twelfth series and the first for song number 5 was in the eighth episode of the eleventh series.

Celebrity Christmas special (27 December 2003)

Order	Celebrity	From	Appeared as	Performing
1	Brigitte Nielsen	Rødovre	Annie Lennox of Eurythmics	"Sisters Are Doin' It for Themselves"
2	Jonathan Wilkes	Stoke-on-Trent	Neil Diamond	"Hello Again"^{2}
3	Samantha Fox	Mile End	Dusty Springfield	"You Don't Have to Say You Love Me"
4	Angela Lonsdale	Penrith	Sharleen Spiteri of Texas	"Black Eyed Boy"
5	Russell Grant	Hillingdon	Anthony Newley	"Who Can I Turn To?"

^{2} Performed twice on Stars in Their Eyes. The first was in the eleventh episode and the grand final of the ninth series, the results show of the grand final of the tenth series, and even the champion of champions special episode.

== 2004 ==
=== Series 15 ===
Episode 1 (3 January 2004)

Order	Contestant	From	Appeared as	Performing
1	Mark Anthony Phillips	East Anglia	Lou Bega	"Mambo No. 5"
2	Karen Webb	Newport	Vera Lynn	"We'll Meet Again"^{2}
3	Nicola Matthews	Chelmsford	Madonna	"Don't Tell Me"
4	Bill Brown	Bristol	Errol Brown of Hot Chocolate	"So You Win Again"
5	Peter James	Havering	Tony Bennett	"I Left My Heart in San Francisco"^{2}

^{2} Both Performed Twice on Stars in Their Eyes. The first for song number 2 was in the ? episode of the ? series, and The first for song number 5 was in the ? episode of the ? series.

Episode 2 (10 January 2004)

Order	Contestant	From	Appeared as	Performing
1	Emma Morgan	Cumbria	Sophie Ellis-Bextor	"Murder on the Dancefloor"
2	Colin Gibson	Merseyside	Nat King Cole	"Stardust"
3	Asa Elliott	Manchester	Bobby Vee	"The Night Has A Thousand Eyes"^{2}
4	Vanessa Wheeler	Staffordshire	Bette Midler	"The Rose"
5	George Gordon	Aviemore	Enrique Iglesias	"Hero"

^{2} Performed Twice on Stars in Their Eyes. The first was in the second episode and the grand final of the seventh series.

Episode 3 (17 January 2004)

Order	Contestant	From	Appeared as	Performing
1	Tracy Quinn	West Midlands	Anastacia	"Not That Kind"
2	Clive Davis		Don Henley of The Eagles	"Hotel California"
3	Robin Glover		Bobby "Boris" Pickett	"The Monster Mash"
4	Carol Griffiths	London	Roberta Flack	"Killing Me Softly with His Song"^{1}
5	Lisa Fletcher	Devon	Sinéad O'Connor	"Nothing Compares 2 U"

^{1} Performed twice on Stars in Their Eyes but once with another act. The first performance with the same song was by Zara McFarlane as Lauryn Hill of The Fugees in the seventh episode of the ninth series.

Episode 4 (24 January 2004)

Order	Contestant	From	Appeared as	Performing
1	Andy McCrink	Bradford	John Lennon of The Beatles	"Twist and Shout"
2	Audrey Williams	East London	Gabrielle	"Out of Reach"
3	Geoff Palfrey	Leicester	Billy Gibbons of ZZ Top	"Sharp Dressed Man"
4	Lindsay Hampshire		Alanis Morissette	"Hand in My Pocket"
5	Becky Clark	Warwickshire	Louise	"Stuck in the Middle with You"^{1}

^{1} Performed twice on Stars in Their Eyes but once with another act. The first performance with the same song was by John Dickson as Gerry Rafferty of Stealers Wheel in the tenth episode of the ninth series.

Episode 5 (31 January 2004)

Order	Contestant	From	Appeared as	Performing
1	Brett Buckland	Taunton	Raul Malo of The Mavericks	"Dance The Night Away"^{2}
2	Tony Shaw	Daventry	James Walsh of Starsailor	"Poor Misguided Fool"
3	Carolyn Cullen	Sheffield	Liza Minnelli	"Cabaret"
4	Cavan Daly	Dublin	Bob Dylan	"Mr. Tambourine Man"
5	Jason Barrow	Edinburgh	Boy George of Culture Club	"I Just Wanna Be Loved"

^{2} Performed Twice on Stars in Their Eyes. The first was in the fourth episode of the tenth series.

Episode 6 (7 February 2004)

Order	Contestant	From	Appeared as	Performing
1	Stuart Brown	Highgate	Ricky Martin	"She Bangs"
2	Nick Bold	Bolton	George Harrison	"My Sweet Lord"
3	Mandy Strain		Nana Mouskouri	"White Rose of Athens"
4	Kevin Gillies	Liverpool	Peter Gabriel	"Sledgehammer"
5	Eno Williams-Offert	London	Alicia Keys	"Fallin'"

Episode 7 (14 February 2004)

Order	Contestant	From	Appeared as	Performing
1	Andy McGowan	Suffolk	Robbie Williams	"Have You Met Miss Jones?"
2	Minnie Tejan-Cole	London	Des'ree	"You Gotta Be"^{2}
3	Nick McCullock	Tamworth	Neil Diamond	"Cracklin' Rosie"
4	Rachel Bullcock	Lancashire	Anne Murray	"You Needed Me"^{3}
5	Ron Davis	Greater Manchester	Jackie Wilson	"Reet Petite"

^{2} Performed twice on Stars in Their Eyes. The first for song number 2 was in the third episode of the ninth series.
^{3} Performed three times on Stars in Their Eyes. The first for song number 4 was in the eighth episode of the fourth series, and the second for song number 4 was in the second episode and the grand final of the tenth series.

Episode 8 (21 February 2004)

Order	Contestant	From	Appeared as	Performing
1	Samantha Adams	Kent	Kylie Minogue	"In Your Eyes"
2	Hezron Ottey	Shrewsbury	Stevie Wonder	"Lately"
3	Paulette Williams	Manchester	Dolly Parton	"9 to 5"
4	Kevin Stokes	Lewes	Joe Cocker	"Unchain My Heart"
5	Neil Allison	Newport	Kelly Jones of Stereophonics	"Have A Nice Day"

Episode 9 (28 February 2004)

Order	Contestant	From	Appeared as	Performing
1	Rachel Kerr	Walsall	Aaliyah	"Try Again"
2	Andrew Pryke	Dunstable	Meat Loaf	"Two Out of Three Ain't Bad"
3	Fanella Lee	St Albans	Peggy Lee	"Fever"^{3}
4	Wayne Ashton	Manchester	David Gray	"Babylon"
5	Keebal Roul		Larry Blackmon of Cameo	"Word Up!"

Episode 10 (6 March 2004)

Order	Contestant	From	Appeared as	Performing
1	David Cox		Barry Gibb of The Bee Gees	"Stayin' Alive"
2	Jenny Jones	Dudley	Nelly Furtado	"Turn Off the Light"
3	Debbie Farrell	Goodrington	Shirley Bassey	"Kiss Me, Honey Honey, Kiss Me"
4	Charles Ngandwe	Manchester	Paul Robeson	"Ol' Man River"
5	Darren Meehan	Blackpool	Harry Connick, Jr.	"It Had To Be You"^{2}

==== Live Grand Final (13 March 2004) ====
Order	Grand Finalist	Winner of Episode...	Appeared as	Performing	Total score	Place
1	Paulette Williams	8 (21 February 2004)	Dolly Parton	"9 to 5"	24,418	6th
2	George Gordon	2 (10 January 2004)	Enrique Iglesias	"Hero"	25,568	5th
3	Bill Brown	1 (3 January 2004)	Errol Brown of Hot Chocolate	"So You Win Again"	29,977	4th
4	Lisa Fletcher	3 (17 January 2004)	Sinéad O'Connor	"Nothing Compares 2 U"	23,135	7th
5	Carolyn Cullen	5 (31 January 2004)	Liza Minnelli	"Cabaret"	10,841	10th
6	Andrew Pryke	9 (28 February 2004)	Meat Loaf	"Two Out of Three Ain't Bad"	63,291	2nd
7	Andy McCrink	4 (24 January 2004)	John Lennon of The Beatles	"Twist and Shout"	17,003	9th
8	Eno Williams-Offert	6 (7 February 2004)	Alicia Keys	"Fallin'"	20,846	8th
9	Nick McCullock	7 (14 February 2004)	Neil Diamond	"Cracklin' Rosie"	34,417	3rd
10	Charles Ngandwe	10 (6 March 2004)	Paul Robeson	"Ol' Man River"	144,468	1st

NOTE: For the first time since the first three series, the finalists started in a random order.

Celebrity special (24 April 2004)

Order	Celebrity	From	Appeared as	Performing
1	Nikki Sanderson^{2}	Blackpool	Britney Spears	"Toxic"
2	Alison Hammond	Kingstanding	Nina Simone	"My Baby Just Cares for Me"
3	Patrick Mower and Liam O'Brien	Various	Dr. Hook	"When You're in Love with a Beautiful Woman"
4	Mike Read	Manchester	Cliff Richard	"Bachelor Boy"
5	Brian Blessed	Mexborough	Luciano Pavarotti	"O Sole Mio"

^{2} Appeared Twice as a Celebrity Star Guest on Stars in Their Eyes. The first was as LeAnn Rimes performing "Can't Fight the Moonlight" on the second Coronation Street special episode.

Soapstars special (1 May 2004)

Order	Celebrity	From	Appeared as	Performing
1	Lucy Pargeter	Nottinghamshire	Emma Bunton	"Maybe"
2	Shaun Williamson	Maidstone	Meat Loaf	"You Took the Words Right Out of My Mouth"
3	Wendi Peters	Lancashire	Kirsty MacColl	"Days"
4	Michael Starke	Merseyside	Paul Carrack	"The Living Years"^{2}
5	Lisa Maxwell	Southwark	Doris Day	"The Deadwood Stage (Whip-Crack-Away!)"

^{2} Performed Twice on Stars in Their Eyes. The first was in the fourth episode and the grand final of the eighth series.

Celebrity special (8 May 2004)

Order	Celebrity	From	Appeared as	Performing
1	Beverley Callard	Morley	Cher	"Strong Enough"
2	Roger Black	Gosport	James Taylor	"You've Got a Friend"
3	Amy Nuttall	Blackburn	Sarah Brightman	"Time to Say Goodbye"
4	Lucy Benjamin	Reading	Gwen Stefani of No Doubt	"Don't Speak"^{2}
5	James Gaddas	Stockton-on-Tees	Robert Palmer	"Addicted to Love"

^{2} Performed Twice on Stars in Their Eyes. The first was in the ninth episode and the grand final of the ninth series.

=== Junior series 3 ===
Episode 1 (20 March 2004)

Order	Contestant	Age	From	Appeared as	Performing
1	Sarah Marshall	15	West Bromwich	Shakira	"Objection (Tango)"
2	Katie Salt	15	Bridgend	Norah Jones	"Don't Know Why"
3	Mitchel Emms	10	Burntwood	Kurt Cobain of Nirvana	"Smells Like Teen Spirit"
4	Simone Jones	15	Higham Ferrers	Natalie Imbruglia	"Torn"
5	Anneliese Devine	15	Leeds	Madonna	"Love Profusion"

Episode 2 (27 March 2004)

Order	Contestant	Age	From	Appeared as	Performing
1	Becky Doyle, Lauren Murray and Jenny Williamson	all 14	Liverpool	Atomic Kitten	"The Last Goodbye"
2	Kirsty Williams	13	Hull	Susan Maughan	"Bobby's Girl"
3	Joe de Casanove	15	Orpington	Eminem	"Lose Yourself"
4	Stephanie Partington	14	Wirral	Dido	"Life for Rent"
5	Aidan Salter	13	Tyne and Wear	Will Young	"Leave Right Now"

Episode 3 (3 April 2004)

Order	Contestant	Age	From	Appeared as	Performing
1	Graeme Mullin	15	East Kilbride	Ronan Keating	"Lovin' Each Day"
2	Pippa Bennett-Warner	15	Cambridgeshire	Dionne Warwick	"Do You Know the Way to San Jose"^{2}
3	Jessica Hamilton	13	London	Alicia Keys	"You Don't Know My Name"
4	Ryan Waite	14	Coventry	Gareth Gates	"Spirit in the Sky"
5	Siobhan Bradbury	15	Sheldon	Joni Mitchell	"Big Yellow Taxi"

^{2} Performed Twice on Stars in Their Eyes. The first was in the fourth celebrity special episode.

Episode 4 (10 April 2004)

Order	Contestant	Age	From	Appeared as	Performing
1	Megan Connelly	15	Westerhope	Amy Lee of Evanescence	"Bring Me to Life"
2	Amy Skippings	12	Bexhill-on-Sea	Dolly Parton	"Love Is Like a Butterfly"
3	Paul Cowperthwaite	13	Bootle	Michael Jackson of Jackson 5	"ABC"
4	Emily McGregor	13	Isle of Wight	Belinda Carlisle	"Heaven Is a Place on Earth"^{2}
5	Sophie Dimambro	16	Birmingham	Eddi Reader of Fairground Attraction	"Perfect"^{2}

^{2} Both Performed twice on Stars in Their Eyes. The first for song number 4 was in the seventh episode and the grand final of the ninth series, and the first for song number 5 was in the eighth episode and the grand final of the fifth series.

Episode 5 (17 April 2004)

Order	Contestant	Age	From	Appeared as	Performing
1	Charlotte Batchelor	13	Slough	Christina Aguilera	"Fighter"
2	Kenny Davies	15	Leeds	Bobby Darin	"Mack the Knife"^{2}
3	Josie and Rebecca Okeghie	Josie: 13 and Rebecca: 15	Solihull	Mary Mary	"Shackles (Praise You)"
4	Chris Woodage	14	Manchester	Michael Ball	"Love Changes Everything"
5	Hannah Evans	14	Lymington	Vanessa Carlton	"A Thousand Miles"

^{2} Performed twice on Stars in Their Eyes. The first was in the ninth episode and the grand final of the sixth series, the results show of the grand final of the seventh series, and even the Champion of Champions special episode.

Episode 6 (24 April 2004)

Order	Contestant	Age	From	Appeared as	Performing
1	Katie Shelswell	15	Northampton	Kylie Minogue	"Can't Get You Out of My Head"^{2}
2	Billy Phillips	14	Basingstoke	Eric Clapton	"Tears in Heaven"
3	Kelly Stanley	13	Medway	Debbie Harry of Blondie	"One Way or Another"
4	Sarah-Jade Rimmer	14	Prescot	Celine Dion	"Immortality"
5	Kyri Chrisostomou	11	Stafford	Donny Osmond	"The Twelfth of Never"

^{2} Performed twice on Stars in Their Eyes. The first was in the Celebrity divas special episode.

Episode 7 (1 May 2004)

Order	Contestant	Age	From	Appeared as	Performing
1	Daniel Wright	14	Skegness	Enrique Iglesias	"Escape"
2	Naomi Murray	15	Leeds	Andrea Corr of The Corrs	"Breathless"
3	Leanne Lawson	13	Sunderland	Brenda Lee	"Sweet Nothin's"^{3}
4	Michaela Miah	13	Dudley	Ashanti	"Foolish"
5	Jonathon Tapp	16	Banstead	Darren Hayes	"To The Moon and Back"

^{3} Performed three times on Stars in Their Eyes. The first was in the fourth episode of the sixth series, and the second was in the sixth episode of the eighth series.

Episode 8 (8 May 2004)

Order	Contestant	Age	From	Appeared as	Performing
1	Ashlea Pearson	13	Birtley	Gloria Estefan	"1–2–3"^{2}
2	Zalika Henry	15	Ilford	Jamelia	"Superstar"
3	Zizi Strallen and Dayle Hodge	Zizi: 13 and Dayle: 14	Twickenham & Yateley	Sonny & Cher	"I Got You Babe"
4	Kesha Wizzart	15	Fallowfield	Toni Braxton	"Un-Break My Heart"
5	Peter Skeen	15	Gateshead	Alex Band of The Calling	"Wherever You Will Go"

==== Live Grand Final (15 May 2004) ====
Order	Grand Finalist	Age	Winner of Episode...	Appeared as	Performing	Total score	Place
1	Ashlea Pearson	13	8 (8 May 2004)	Gloria Estefan	"1–2–3"	15,032	8th
2	Pippa Bennett-Warner	16	3 (3 April 2004)	Dionne Warwick	"Do You Know the Way to San Jose"	8,828	9th
3	Kenny Davies	15	5 (17 April 2004)	Bobby Darin	"Mack the Knife"	25,818	4th
4	Naomi Murray	15	7 (1 May 2004)	Andrea Corr	"Breathless"	17,815	7th
5	Kirsty Williams	13	2 (27 March 2004)	Susan Maughan	"Bobby's Girl"	51,469	2nd
6	Billy Phillips	14	6 (24 April 2004)	Eric Clapton	"Tears in Heaven"	46,916	3rd
7	Aidan Salter	13	2 (27 March 2004) (Wildcard winner)	Will Young	"Leave Right Now"	19,490	5th
8	Katie Salt	14	1 (20 March 2004)	Norah Jones	"Don't Know Why"	18,760	6th
9	Paul Cowperthwaite	13	4 (10 April 2004)	Michael Jackson	"ABC"	62,878	1st

Celebrity special (26 June 2004)

Order	Celebrity	From	Appeared as	Performing
1	Verity Rushworth	Bradford	Rachel Stevens	"Sweet Dreams My LA Ex"
2	Chris Finch	Leeds	Marti Pellow of Wet Wet Wet	"Love Is All Around"
3	Penny Smith	Eastwood	Debbie Harry of Blondie	"Denis"
4	Tim Healy	Newcastle Upon Tyne	Joe Cocker	"You Are So Beautiful"
5	Jack Ryder	South London	Justin Timberlake	"Like I Love You"

Celebrity Christmas special (18 December 2004)

Order	Celebrity	From	Appeared as	Performing
1	Tony Audenshaw	Denton	Roy Wood of Wizzard	"I Wish It Could Be Christmas Everyday"
2	Kerry Katona	Warrington	Marilyn Monroe	"Santa Baby"
3	James Hewitt	Derry	Bing Crosby	"White Christmas"
4	Rupert Hill	Southampton	Chris Rea	"Driving Home for Christmas"
5	Tricia Penrose	Kirkby	Brenda Lee	"Rockin' Around the Christmas Tree"

== 2005 ==
=== Series 16 ===
Episode 1 (15 January 2005)

Order	Contestant	From	Appeared as	Performing
1	Laura Sutton	Capel Coch	Celine Dion	"I Drove All Night"
2	Craig Halford	Wolverhampton	Meat Loaf	"I'd Do Anything for Love (But I Won't Do That)"
3	Laura Styler	Redditch	Delta Goodrem	"Lost Without You"
4	Jay Rhodes	Sheffield	Shaggy	"Oh Carolina"
5	Laura Tallentire	Stanley	Sharleen Spiteri	"Say What You Want"^{2}

Episode 2 (22 January 2005)

Order	Contestant	From	Appeared as	Performing
1	Simon Hall	Biddulph	Justin Hawkins of The Darkness	"I Believe in a Thing Called Love"
2	Susan Cartwright	Southall	Lulu	"To Sir, with Love"
3	Carl Sharpe	Swindon	Bryan Adams	"Summer of '69"^{2}
4	Lauren Paterson	Clackmannanshire	Christina Aguilera	"Beautiful"
5	Maria Collins	Stevenage	Emma Bunton	"Crickets Sing for Anamaria"

Episode 3 (29 January 2005)

Order	Contestant	From	Appeared as	Performing
1	Carlene Graham	Warrington	Gloria Gaynor	"Never Can Say Goodbye"
2	Justin Bone		Ronan Keating	"If Tomorrow Never Comes"
3	Kelvin Utter	Cardiff	Al Green	"Let's Stay Together"^{2}
4	Mark Hoy	Worcester	Engelbert Humperdinck	"Release Me"
5	Emma Shade	Llandudno	Faith Hill	"There You'll Be"

^{2} Performed twice on Stars in Their Eyes. The first was in the fourth episode of the ninth series.

Episode 4 (5 February 2005)

Order	Contestant	From	Appeared as	Performing
1	Zoe Sharman	Nottingham	Bonnie Tyler	"Holding Out for a Hero"
2	Thomas Maguire	Belfast	Harry Connick, Jr.	"Recipe for Making Love"
3	Katie Sewell	Birmingham	Katie Melua	"The Closest Thing to Crazy"
4	Rob Lewis	Bradford	Phil Collins	"Something Happened on the Way to Heaven"
5	Gordon Hendricks	Stoke-on-Trent	Elvis Presley	"Suspicious Minds"

Episode 5 (12 February 2005)

Order	Contestant	From	Appeared as	Performing
1	Meral Djemil	Tottenham	Anastacia	"Left Outside Alone"
2	Paul Grant	Croydon	Luther Vandross	"Always and Forever"
3	Jason Watkins	Telford	Boy George of Culture Club	"Karma Chameleon"
4	Caroline Rudd	Rochdale	Ann Wilson of Heart	"Alone"^{2}
5	Hadrian Lowe	Manchester	Leo Sayer	"One Man Band"

Episode 6 (19 February 2005)

Order	Contestant	From	Appeared as	Performing
1	Gemma Nelson	Horsham	Shania Twain	"I'm Gonna Getcha Good"
2	Steve Duncan	Paignton	George Formby	"The Window Cleaner"
3	Laura Critchley	Cheshire	Jessica Simpson	"With You"
4	Paul Duckworth	Leyland	Will Young	"Light My Fire"
5	Claude Hopkins	Rutland	Whitney Houston	"I Have Nothing"

Episode 7 (27 February 2005)

Order	Contestant	From	Appeared as	Performing
1	Scott Weston		Ricky Martin	"Loaded"
2	Angie Diggins	Wivenhoe	Sarah Brightman	"Think of Me"
3	Roger Davies	Halifax	Andy Williams	"Can't Take My Eyes Off You"
4	Dan Weston		David Gray	"This Year's Love"
5	Barbie Allen	Chatham	Karen Carpenter of The Carpenters	"Superstar"

Episode 8 (5 March 2005)

Order	Contestant	From	Appeared as	Performing
1	Bonita Knowles	Derby	Shakira	"Whenever, Wherever"
2	Wayne Harrison		Don Williams	"You're My Best Friend"
3	Dave Dixon	Tamworth	Neil Diamond	"Forever in Blue Jeans"^{2}
4	Shelley Gould	Highcliffe	Carly Simon	"Nobody Does It Better"
5	Ed Blaney	Wearside	David Bowie	"Space Oddity"

Episode 9 (12 March 2005)

Order	Contestant	From	Appeared as	Performing
1	Arif Jamal	West Sussex	Prince	"Kiss"
2	Sarah Hitchcock	Leeds	Dido	"White Flag"
3	Luke Maskery	Stoke-on-Trent	John Denver	"Annie's Song"^{2}
4	Michaela Whinnett	Melling	Doris Day	"Que Sera, Sera"^{3}
5	Alex Corrie	Cheshire	LeAnn Rimes	"Can't Fight the Moonlight"^{2}

Episode 10 (19 March 2005)

Order	Contestant	From	Appeared as	Performing
1	Jim Clarke	Belfast	Andy Bell of Erasure	"A Little Respect"
2	Stuart Norgrove	Kidderminster	Darren Hayes of Savage Garden	"To the Moon and Back"
3	Brooke Arthur	Camberley	Alanis Morissette	"You Oughta Know"
4	Gemma Taylor	North Yorkshire	Alison Moyet	"Is This Love?"^{2}
5	Jason Hockley	Chelmsford	Gary Jules	"Mad World"

==== Live Grand Final (26 March 2005) ====
Order	Grand Finalist	Winner of Episode...	Appeared as	Performing	Total score	Place
1	Simon Hall	2 (22 January 2005)	Justin Hawkins	"I Believe In A Thing Called Love"	15,262	7th
2	Paul Grant	5 (12 February 2005)	Luther Vandross	"Always and Forever"	13,608	9th
3	Sarah Hitchcock	9 (12 March 2005)	Dido	"White Flag"	14,384	8th
4	Rob Lewis	4 (5 February 2005)	Phil Collins	"Something Happened on The Way to Heaven"	27,994	3rd
5	Bonita Knowles	8 (5 March 2005)	Shakira	"Whenever, Wherever"	13,206	10th
6	Gordon Hendricks	4 (5 February 2005) (Wildcard winner)	Elvis Presley	"Suspicious Minds"	84,895	1st
7	Jim Clarke	10 (19 March 2005)	Andy Bell	"A Little Respect"	21,806	4th
8	Angie Diggins	7 (27 February 2005)	Sarah Brightman	"Think of Me"	18,758	5th
9	Paul Duckworth	6 (19 February 2005)	Will Young	"Light My Fire"	16,826	6th
10	Laura Sutton	1 (15 January 2005)	Celine Dion	"I Drove All Night"	38,852	2nd

NOTE: The winner of Episode 3, Kelvin Utter as Al Green, did not appear for personal reasons, so the runner-up and wildcard winner of Episode 4 Gordon Hendricks as Elvis Presley appeared in the Grand Final instead.

Celebrity special (2 April 2005)

Order	Celebrity	From	Appeared as	Performing
1	Jerry Springer	Chicago	Elvis Presley	"Can't Help Falling in Love"
2	Jeff Brazier	Essex	Ali Campbell of UB40	"Kingston Town"^{3}
3	Nell McAndrew	Leeds	Kim Wilde	"Kids in America"^{2}
4	Victoria Bush	King's Lynn	Mama Cass	"It's Getting Better"
5	Vickie Gates	Wirral	Maria McKee	"Show Me Heaven"^{2}

Celebrity special (23 July 2005)

Order	Celebrity	From	Appeared as	Performing
1	Dale Meeks and Mark Charnock	Various	The Blues Brothers	"Everybody Needs Somebody to Love"
2	Yvette Fielding	Stockport	Annie Lennox	"No More I Love You's"
3	Eamonn Holmes	Belfast	Johnny Cash	"Ring of Fire"
4	Colin Murray	Dundonald	Mark Knopfler of Dire Straits	"Walk of Life"
5	Debra Stephenson	Hull	Kate Bush	"Babooshka"^{2}

Soapstars special (30 July 2005)

Order	Celebrity	From	Appeared as	Performing
1	Adele Silva	Norbury	Kylie Minogue	"In Your Eyes"^{2}
2	Bradley Walsh	Watford	Tony Bennett	"I Left My Heart in San Francisco"^{2}
3	Louis Emerick	Toxteth	Lionel Richie	"All Night Long (All Night)"
4	Lee Otway	Bradford	Richard Marx	"Right Here Waiting"^{2}
5	John Middleton and Charlotte Bellamy	Various	Bing Crosby and Grace Kelly	"True Love"^{2}

Reality TV special (6 August 2005)

Order	Celebrity	From	Appeared as	Performing
1	Al Murray	Stewkley	Neil Diamond	"I'm a Believer"
2	Nancy Sorrell	Chigwell	Karen Carpenter of The Carpenters	"Rainy Days and Mondays"^{2}
3	Josie d'Arby	Newport	Toni Braxton	"He Wasn't Mad Enough"
4	Iwan Thomas	Farnborough	Chris Martin of Coldplay	"The Scientist"
5	Paul Ross	Romford	Tommy Steele	"Flash, Bang, Wallop!"

Celebrity special (13 August 2005)

Order	Celebrity	From	Appeared as	Performing
1	Stephen Mulhern	Stratford	Robbie Williams	"Let Me Entertain You"^{2}
2	Tracey Wilkinson	County Durham	Julie London	"Cry Me A River"^{2}
3	Will Mellor	Bredbury	George Michael	"I Can't Make You Love Me"
4	Andrew Lancel	Rufford	Morten Harket of a-ha	"The Sun Always Shines on T.V."
5	Tupele Dorgu	Preston	Beyoncé	"Crazy in Love"

Celebrity duets special (24 December 2005)

Order	Celebrity	Appeared as	Performing
1	Matt Healy and Emily Symons	Sonny & Cher	"I Got You Babe"
2	Paul Daniels and Debbie McGee	Fred Astaire and Judy Garland	"A Couple of Swells"
3	Colin McAllister and Justin Ryan	Robson & Jerome	"I Believe"
4	Richard Shelton and Claire Sweeney	Neil Diamond and Barbra Streisand	"You Don't Bring Me Flowers"
5	Vanessa Feltz and Matthew Wright	Renée and Renato	"Save Your Love"

== 2006 ==
Family special (7 January 2006)

Order	Family	From	Appeared as	Performing
1	Laney and daughters Tiffany and Laena Jackson	Nottingham	The Supremes	"Baby Love"^{2}
2	Giles and wife Estelle Evans	Coventry	Bryan Adams and Melanie C	"When You're Gone"
3	Hannah, Kathryn, Jordan, Kristien and Hayden Bateman	Yorkshire	The New Seekers	"I'd Like to Teach the World to Sing"
4	Tony and wife Julie Wright	Kent	Bill Medley & Jennifer Warnes	"(I've Had) The Time of My Life"
5	Father and son Steven and Simon Wright, uncle Stephen Handley and brother-in-law Rob Hempsall	Manchester	The Beatles	"Love Me Do"

=== Junior series 4 ===
Episode 1 (21 January 2006)

Order	Contestant	Age	From	Appeared as	Performing
1	Lucia Walsh Hughes	15	East Yorkshire	Gwen Stefani	"What You Waiting For"
2	Kingsley Judd	11	Preston	Donny Osmond	"Puppy Love"^{2}
3	Georgia Taylor	14	Cleethorpes	Joss Stone	"You Had Me"
4	Dean Moles	16	Essex	Enrique Iglesias	"Hero"^{2}
5	Becky Cooper	16	Sherborne	Cyndi Lauper	"Girls Just Want to Have Fun"^{2}

^{2} All Performed twice on Stars in Their Eyes. The first for song number 2 was in the first episode of the first junior series, The first for song number 4 was in the ? episode of the ? series, and the first for song number 5 was in the ? episode of the ? series.

Episode 2 (28 January 2006)

Order	Contestant	Age	From	Appeared as	Performing
1	Ebony Jayne O'Brien	11	Sheffield	Cher	"Love and Understanding"^{2}
2	Elliot Greer	13	Stirling	Ricky Wilson of Kaiser Chiefs	"Every Day I Love You Less and Less"
3	Jessica Robinson	13	Middlesbrough	Natalie Imbruglia	"Shiver"
4	Christopher Napier	8	Staffordshire	George Formby	"With My Little Stick of Blackpool Rock"
5	David Goosen	15	Buckinghamshire	Gary Jules	"Mad World"^{2}

^{2} Both Performed twice on Stars in Their Eyes. The first for song number 1 was in the eighth episode of the sixth series, and the first for song number 5 was in the ? episode of the ? junior series.

Episode 3 (4 February 2006)

Order	Contestant	Age	From	Appeared as	Performing
1	Joseph Hodgkinson	14	Doncaster	Jake Shears of Scissor Sisters	"Take Your Mama"
2	Sasha Tandon	16	Gortin	Ms. Dynamite	"Dy-Na-Mi-Tee"
3	Jamie Muscato	15	Brighton	Michael Crawford	"The Music of the Night"^{2}
4	Danielle Houston	15	Glasgow	Lucie Silvas	"What You're Made Of"
5	Michael Daniels	16	Derby	Chris Martin of Coldplay	"The Scientist"

Episode 4 (11 February 2006)

Order	Contestant	Age	From	Appeared as	Performing
1	Laurie Williams	14	Haverfordwest	Charlotte Church	"Crazy Chick"
2	Holly Millard	14	Portsmouth	Sandie Shaw	"Puppet on a String"^{2}
3	Stephen Yeomans	15	Telford	Mark Knopfler of Dire Straits	"Sultans of Swing"
4	Dominic Harris	14	Kingstanding	Lemar	"If There's Any Justice"
5	Rebekah Hawkins	16	Liverpool	Alison Moyet	"That Ole Devil Called Love"^{2}

Episode 5 (18 February 2006)

Order	Contestant	Age	From	Appeared as	Performing
1	Chloe Parry	12	Shrewsbury	Kylie Minogue	"I Believe In You"
2	Sidonie Spooner	16	Dovercourt	Celine Dion	"Because You Loved Me"^{2}
3	Dominic Lawson	14	Birmingham	Pharrell Williams of N.E.R.D	"Maybe"
4	Sarah Pollin	15	Pontefract	Crystal Gayle	"Don't It Make My Brown Eyes Blue"^{3}
5	Joseph Hazlett	14	Bootle	James Blunt	"You're Beautiful"

^{3} Performed three times on Stars in Their Eyes. The first was in the second episode of the fourth series, and the second was in the seventh episode of the second junior series.

Episode 6 (25 February 2006)

Order	Contestant	Age	From	Appeared as	Performing
1	Katriona Perrett	15	Guildford	Shirley MacLaine	"If My Friends Could See Me Now"
2	Matthew Navin	14	Cheshire	Don McLean	"Vincent"
3	Paije Richardson	14	Islington	Jackie Wilson	"(Your Love Keeps Lifting Me) Higher and Higher"
4	Sarah-Jane Davies	15	Swansea	Christina Aguilera	"The Voice Within"
5	Amanda Jane Gibbons	13	Wirral	Doris Day	"Secret Love"

Episode 7 (4 March 2006)

Order	Contestant	Age	From	Appeared as	Performing
1	Alison Halliday	15	Salisbury	Geri Halliwell	"Look At Me"^{2}
2	Zac Harris	15	Dorset	Tom Chaplin of Keane	"Somewhere Only We Know"
3	Kelly Griggs	14	Weston-super-Mare	Bonnie Tyler	"Total Eclipse of the Heart"
4	Carly Marie Beardsley	15	Derbyshire	Jem	"Wish I"
5	Andrew Norman	14	Barnstaple	Roy Orbison	"Oh, Pretty Woman"^{2}

Episode 8 (11 March 2006)

Order	Contestant	Age	From	Appeared as	Performing
1	Ben Rogers	9	Oxford	Noddy Holder of Slade	"Cum on Feel the Noize"^{2}
2	Holly Kirby	15	Isle of Wight	Enya	"Orinoco Flow"
3	Aaron Hirst	15	Rochdale	Eminem	"Without Me"
4	Jos Slovick	16	Palmers Green	Dean Martin	"That's Amore"
5	Kassie-Jay Bowers	15	Oldham	Natasha Bedingfield	"Unwritten"

==== Live Grand Final (18 March 2006) ====
Order	Grand Finalist	Age	Winner of Episode...	Appeared as	Performing	Place
1	Chloe Parry	12	5 (18 February 2006)	Kylie Minogue	"I Believe in You"	Finalist
2	Dominic Harris	14	4 (11 February 2006)	Lemar	"If There's Any Justice"	Finalist
3	Danielle Houston	15	3 (4 February 2006)	Lucie Silvas	"What You're Made Of"	Finalist
4	Kelly Griggs	14	7 (4 March 2006)	Bonnie Tyler	"Total Eclipse of the Heart"	Finalist
5	Christopher Napier	9	2 (28 January 2006) (Wildcard winner)	George Formby	"With My Little Stick of Blackpool Rock"	1st
6	Sarah-Jane Davies	15	6 (25 February 2006)	Christina Aguilera	"The Voice Within"	2nd
7	Ben Rogers	9	8 (11 March 2006)	Noddy Holder	"Cum On Feel the Noize"	Finalist
8	David Goosen	15	2 (28 January 2006)	Gary Jules	"Mad World"	Finalist
9	Georgia Taylor	14	1 (21 January 2006)	Joss Stone	"You Had Me"	Finalist

Celebrity special (25 March 2006)

Order	Celebrity	From	Appeared as	Performing
1	Ben Richards	West Sussex	Ricky Martin	"Livin' la Vida Loca"^{2}
2	Neil Fox	Harrow	Dean Martin	"Sway"
3	Charlene Tilton	San Diego	Madonna	"Hanky Panky"
4	Jade Goody	London	Lynn Anderson	"Rose Garden"
5	Martin Offiah	Hackney	Tunde Baiyewu of Lighthouse Family	"Lifted"^{2}

Celebrity special (1 April 2006)

Order	Celebrity	From	Appeared as	Performing
1	Hayley Tamaddon	Bispham	Lulu	"Shout"
2	Neil Ruddock	Wandsworth	Neil Diamond	"Song Sung Blue"
3	Richard Arnold and Kate Garraway	Various	Frank and Nancy Sinatra	"Somethin' Stupid"
4	Tony Slattery	Stonebridge	Paul Heaton	"Caravan of Love"
5	Jennie Bond	Hitchin	Debbie Harry of Blondie	"One Way or Another"

Celebrity special (8 April 2006)

Order	Celebrity	From	Appeared as	Performing
1	Helen Latham	Hartlepool	Dolly Parton	"9 to 5"
2	Bruce Byron	Fulham	Phil Collins	"In the Air Tonight"
3	Antonia Okonma	Central London	Tina Turner	"Nutbush City Limits"
4	Julia Mallam	Doncaster	Norah Jones	"Don't Know Why"
5	Stefan Booth	Bath	Elvis Presley	"Blue Suede Shoes"

Celebrity special (23 December 2006)

Order	Celebrity	From	Appeared as	Performing
1	Paul Burrell	Grassmoor	Richard Gere	"Razzle Dazzle"
2	Tom Lister	Ingleton	Jamie Cullum	"Everlasting Love"
3	Phina Oruche	Liverpool	Lauryn Hill	"Killing Me Softly"
4	Jayne Tunnicliffe	Bradford	Marianne Faithfull	"As Tears Go By"
5	Mark Radcliffe	Bolton	Shane MacGowan of The Pogues	"The Irish Rover"

== 2015 ==
=== Series 17 ===
Episode 1 (10 January 2015)

Order	Contestant	From	Appeared as	Performing
1	Anne Martin	Stroud	Kylie Minogue	"On a Night Like This"
2	Hayley and Gerry Judge	Surrey	The Everly Brothers	"All I Have to Do Is Dream"
3	Olivia Peyech	Slough	Rihanna	"Umbrella"
4	Blake Greenwell	Stoke-on-Trent	Eminem	"Lose Yourself"
5	Christie Holland	Cardiff	Christina Aguilera	"Ain't No Other Man"

Episode 2 (17 January 2015)

Order	Contestant	From	Appeared as	Performing
1	Emily Hullman	Harrogate	Jessie J	"Price Tag"
2	Cylvian Flynn	London	Tina Turner	"The Best"^{2}
3	Peter Sarsfield	Manchester	Frankie Valli of The Four Seasons	"Sherry"
4	Emma Jones	Chirk	Miley Cyrus	"Wrecking Ball"
5	Ash Ocego	Runcorn	Mark Owen of Take That	"Shine"

^{2} Performed twice on Stars in Their Eyes. The first was in the ? episode of the ? series
^{3} Performed three times on Stars in Their Eyes. The first was in the ? episode of the ? series, and the second was in the ? episode of the ? series.

Episode 3 (24 January 2015)

Order	Contestant	From	Appeared as	Performing
1	Nathan Simpson	Oldham	Michael Bublé	"Cry Me A River"
2	Samantha Batey	Birmingham	Aretha Franklin	"Respect"
3	Emma Wright	Blackpool	Lady Gaga	"The Edge of Glory"
4	Roger Boyd	Belfast	Meat Loaf	"I'd Do Anything for Love (But I Won't Do That)"
5	Samantha Atkinson	Hull	Adele	"Someone like You"

Episode 4 (31 January 2015)

Order	Contestant	From	Appeared as	Performing
1	Caitlin Kennedy Ross	Harwood	Dolly Parton	"9 to 5"
2	Andrew Dunn	Warrington	Plan B	"She Said"
3	Sharon Williams	Solihull	Paloma Faith	"Picking Up The Pieces"
4	Ben Alexander Williams	Rhyl	Neil Diamond	"Hello Again"^{3}
5	Gabby Larkin	Brentwood	Amy Winehouse	"Valerie"

^{3} Performed three times on Stars in Their Eyes. The first was in the ? episode of the ? series, and the second was in the ? episode of the ? series.

Episode 5 (7 February 2015)

Order	Contestant	From	Appeared as	Performing
1	Penny Diamond	Oldham	Debbie Harry of Blondie	"Heart of Glass"
2	Kelly Patterson	Newcastle-upon-Tyne	Britney Spears	"Toxic"^{2}
3	Jim Thompson	Stockport	Morrissey of The Smiths	"This Charming Man"^{2}
4	Kurt White	West Midlands	John Legend	"All of Me"
5	Claude Lovett	East Sussex	Diana Ross of The Supremes	"Chain Reaction"

Grand Final (14 February 2015)

Order	Finalist	Appeared as	Performing
1	Christie Holland	Christina Aguilera	"Candyman"
2	Peter Sarsfield	Frankie Valli	"Big Girls Don't Cry"
3	Sharon Williams	Paloma Faith	"Only Love Can Hurt Like This"
4	Emma Wright	Lady Gaga	"Born This Way"
5	Kurt White	John Legend	"Ordinary People"
