= Casino Classics: Chapter One =

Compilation album by various artists
- Released: 1979
- Recorded: 1964−1978
- Genre: Northern soul
- Length: 37:40
- Label: Casino Classics
- Producer: Various

Casino Classics chronology
Casino Classics: Chapter One (1979)	Casino Classics: Chapter Two (1980)

Casino Classics: Chapter One is a compilation album released by Casino Classics in 1979, which compiles the first seven northern soul singles (fourteen songs overall) that the label had released or re-released as 45 rpm releases in 1978–79 following their popularity at northern soul nightclub Wigan Casino. The singles, some of which were rare, were originally released on the label in order to cater for the nightclub's record-collecting goers at the height of the nightclub's popularity. The compilation is the first in the Casino Classics series and was released to general acclaim. It has been described as a best-selling album. In 2015, Cherry Red Records re-released the album as part of the Casino Classics: Complete Collection box set.

== Background ==
In the 1970s, the northern soul nightclub Wigan Casino, based in Wigan, Lancashire and established in 1973, was one of the most popular northern soul all-nighters in northern England, even being voted "greatest disco in the world" by Billboard in 1978. The club's owner, Gary Marshall, alongside its founder and popular DJ, Russ Winstanley, and the nightclub's manager, Mike Walker, founded the record label Casino Classics in 1978 as a means to re-release some of the popular, and often rare songs played in the club as singles in order for the club's devoted followers to own them, and to reflect the nightclub's popularity. The label is seen as the first of several such new labels that capitalised on northern soul's popularity by negotiating licences for certain popular records from the copyright holders, followed by PYE Disco Demand, Inferno, Kent Modern and Goldmine. Though most of the music was released as singles, the label conceived a series of compilation albums named after the label, Casino Classics, to collect the music released on the label onto single LPs.

== Music ==
Casino Classics: Chapter One is the inaugural edition of the series, compiling the songs that featured on the label's first seven singles, as well as the three tracks that comprised the Three Before Eight EP, which the label released on 3 February 1978. The album's liner notes describe its songs as "the most popular sounds that have echoed around Wigan Casino for the past five years." According to reviewer Joe Marchese, the album "features a number of artists familiar to northern soul, girl group, and vintage R&B connoisseurs," while another reviewer described the album, and its follow-up albums, as a "curious mix of obscure songs with big selling hits and far away misses." In addition to northern soul, there is a minority of modern soul music on the album, a genre which became more prominent on the follow-up albums. This reflects the album's "absolute lack of snobbery" when concerning its selections, at a time when elitism had started to become more prominent in northern soul.

"Every track runs straight into the next to keep your party or dance going non-stop, or just to allow the D.J. time to nip to the loo!"

— Liner notes (1979)

The songs are slightly segued together in order to make the album reminiscent of a night at Wigan Casino. There are several instrumentals on the album, namely a couplet of pieces by The Ron Grainer Orchestra ("A Touch of Velvet, a Sting of Brass" and his theme music for Joe 90) as well as two exclusive recordings ("The Joker" and "Six by Six", released together on yellow vinyl) by the Allnight Band, a studio band commissioned especially by Winstanley for the label. The single containing the two Ron Grainer Orchestra tracks, released by the label on 24 November 1978, had reached number 60 on the UK Singles Chart, as DJ Dave Lee Travis used "A Touch of Velvet, A Sting of Brass" as the opening theme music on his daily radio show.

Lorraine Silver's "Lost Summer Love" (1965) was recorded when she was 13, while Lenny Gamble's cover of Doris Troy's "I'll Do Anything" has been cited as an example of the series' "playful nature." The Flirtations' "Little Darling (I Need You)" (1972), written by Holland Dozier Holland and originally recorded by Marvin Gaye, has become known as a lost classic. One reviewer noted of "Panic" (1968) by Reparta and the Delrons: "this particular song was a B-side and it is no surprise that this song with its insistent shuffling beat was so popular on the Northern Soul scene in the 1970s." The compilation finishes with the "Three Before Eight", the three now-iconic songs that Winstanley would play at the club at the end of each night to signal the night's end, namely Jimmy Radcliffe's "Long After Tonight is All Over" (1964), Tobi Legend's "Time Will Pass You By" (1968) and Dean Parrish's "I'm On My Way" (1967). These were issued as the Three Before Eight EP in 1978.

== Release and legacy ==
Casino Classics: Chapter One was released by Casino Classics in 1979; though not charting on the UK Albums Chart, it has been described as a best-selling album. The second album in the series was released in 1980, and the third and final album was released after the label's closure in 1981, both album's showcasing a bigger influence from modern soul than the first volume. Long John of Eye Plug noted that even though there could have been no unanimous decision on a perfect compilation, Casino Classics: Chapter One was nonetheless successful because "compilations play a vital role in introducing the uninitiated to new types of music." He felt that, with hindsight, the inclusion of The Ron Grainer Orchestra material "seems rather odd" given that Grainer composed music for television and film, but "you have to admire Russ Winstanley for including these tracks, as it is unlikely that these tunes will grace many Northern Soul compilations these days."

Cherry Red Records remastered and re-released all three editions of the Casino Classics series as the Casino Classics: Complete Collection box set on 28 August 2015. The box set contains all the songs released on Casino Classics, including those not on the compilations, which are instead placed as bonus tracks to each of the three compilations. The Chapter One disc adds three such bonus tracks, namely Autumn's instrumental "Time Out" and Nicky Wilson's "Stone Soul Loving" and "Cry Like a Child"; all three such bonus tracks were originally recorded exclusively for the label. Writing for Eye Plug magazine in 2015, Long John wrote that, with hindsight, the "open minded music policy" of the Casino Classics series, as established with Chapter One, "is to be applauded as the Northern scene in more recent years has succumbed to churlish elitism, by puritanical DJs and collectors, who will sneer at those whose own tastes in music are not obscure and exclusive enough to be allowed into the clique." He continued:

"This must seem baffling to outsiders considering that without exception all of these artists wanted to be popular and wanted their music to be heard by as many people as possible. However, for many reasons including lack of commercial appeal these artists were ignored in the 1960s, but here in the U.K these records were devoured by music obsessed working class English with the apogee of Northern Soul popularity arguably reaching its peak in the mid 1970s."

== Track listing ==
=== Side one ===
1. The Ron Grainer Orchestra – "A Touch Of Velvet - A Sting Of Brass"
2. Lorraine Silver – "Lost Summer Love"
3. The Ron Grainer Orchestra – "Theme from Joe 90"
4. Reparata and the Delrons – "Panic"
5. James and Bobby Purify – "Shake a Tail Feather"
6. Lenny Gamble – "I'll Do Anything"
7. Allnight Band — "Six by Six"

=== Side two ===
1. Allnight Band – "The Joker"
2. The Flirtations – "Little Darling"
3. Diana Foster — "I'm Gonna Share It with You
4. Gerri Granger – "I Go to Pieces
5. Jimmy Radcliffe – "Long After Tonight Is All Over"
6. Tobi Legend – "Time Will Pass You By"
7. Dean Parrish – "I'm on My Way"

== See also ==
- Wigan Casino
- Northern soul
