= Paul Stuart Davies =

British soul singer

- Born: 24 June 1982 (age 44); Manchester, England
- Occupations: Singer, songwriter, vocal coach

Paul Stuart Davies (born 24 June 1982) is a British soul singer, songwriter and vocal coach, best known for his community project ‘Begin2Sing’, his 2012 hit 'Mighty By Nature', and his work on the Northern soul and Motown scene.

== Early career ==
Davies began performing on the North West pub and club circuit from the moment he left school in 1998. He studied music through Access to Music and Blackburn College before being asked to work for both, launching a career as a vocal coach. In 2003, Davies, along with guitarist Mark Bateson, set up Darwen School of Music (originally Elite School of Music) and in the same year received an award of excellence presented by Beatles producer Sir George Martin.

== 2012–present ==
Davies' first independent single release "Mighty by Nature" hit the number 28 spot on the official UK Indie Chart; despite having no official label backing. "Mighty by Nature" was written in memory of Lewis Mighty, a seven-year old victim of neuroblastoma.

Further recordings of "Let's Get It On" and "Time Will Pass You By" gained the attention of Janis Gaye (wife of Motown singer Marvin Gaye) and Northern soul DJ Russ Winstanley, leading to an increased presence on the UK's Northern soul scene.

In September 2015, Davies made his first of five appearances at the World's Biggest Northern Soul Weekender at Butlins resort, Skegness, Lincolnshire, England, performing alongside classic Motown artists the Velvelettes, Brenda Holloway, the Contours, and a duet with Kim Weston on "It Takes Two".

He returned in 2016 to share the stage with Tommy Hunt, Dean Parrish, Pat Lewis, Chris Clark and Sidney Barnes, where the group recorded a version of Frank Wilson's "Do I Love You (Indeed I Do)" for charity, along with Johnny Boy and the Signatures, under the name Northern Soul Survivors.

In 2017, Davies made his first visit to Detroit to record at the United Sound Systems studio. The single "Tomorrow's Love" was recorded at this time, with background vocal contributions from Kim Weston, Tobi Lark, Pat Lewis and original Vandellas Annette Beard and Rosalind Ashford. The B-side was Davies' rendition of "Wherever I Lay My Hat (That's My Home)" which he had previously released as a single featuring the Original Vandellas in 2016.

2018 saw Davies join Manchester Camerata and Joe Duddell for "Out on the Floor"; a live orchestrated Northern soul and Motown project that debuted at Manchester's Bridgewater Hall to rave reviews.

At the final 'Northern Soul Survivors' weekender in 2019, Davies worked with Gloria Jones, known for her original version of the song "Tainted Love". Davies' friendship with Jones led to the twinning of Darwen School of Music with the Marc Bolan School of Music, which she founded in West Africa. In January 2020, Davies travelled to Makeni in Sierra Leone to visit the school and to work with the orphans who attend.

2022 saw Davies team up with Motown recording artist Charlene to write and release "Fairytale Life". Coincidentally, Charlene’s number one record "I've Never Been to Me" was the number one record on the UK charts on the day Davies was born in 1982.

In 2025, Paul launched Begin2Sing, a community singing project in his home town of Darwen that holds workshops for local residents, plus a series of single releases that feature hundreds of voices from the community. Gloria Jones is the project’s patron and introduced them on stage at the first single launch that year. In 2026 they were joined on stage by Nick Laird Clowes. of The Dream Academy, when they performed a cover version of the band’s 1985 hit, Life in a Northern Town.

== Discography ==
=== Singles and EPs ===
Year	Release	Chart positions
Year	Release	UK Indie
2012	"Mighty by Nature"	28
2016	"Northern Soul Reimagined" EP	—
2017	"Tomorrow's Love"	—
2018	"Baby, It's Yours"	—
2018	"Wonderin'"	—
2021	"Wonderin'" (re-recording)	—
2021	"A Good Good Thing"	—
2022	"Fairytale Life" (with Charlene)	—
2024	"Surrender" EP	—
"—" denotes releases that did not chart.
