= Diane Shaw =

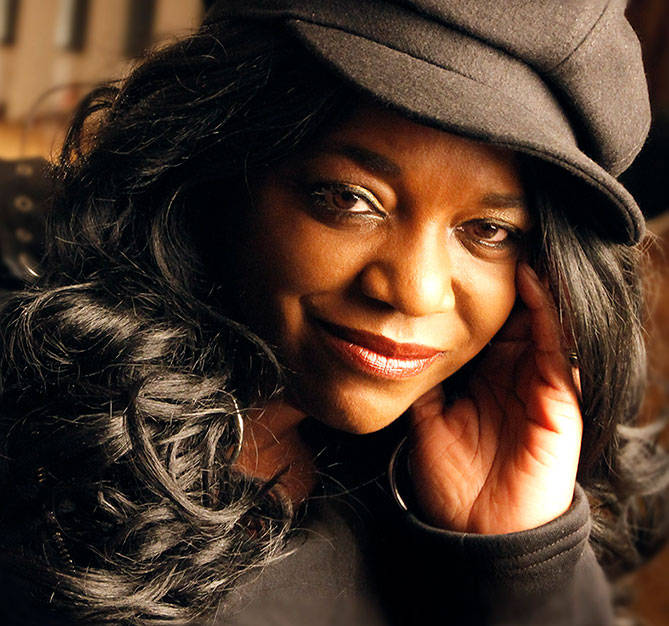

Background information
- Born: Diane Delores Hunte
- Origin: Manchester, England
- Genres: Modern soul, Northern soul, Motown sound
- Labels: Mecca Records
- Website: Official website

Diane Shaw from Manchester, England is a British soul singer, who has been touring and performing for 20 years. In that time Shaw has gained a considerable following around the UK, particularly on the British Modern soul and Northern soul scene.

== Early career ==
Performing for some years around pubs and clubs in the North of England, she was entered by a booking agent into the ITV show Stars in Their Eyes in 1998. After passing the audition, under her marital name of Diane Birkinshaw, she went on to win her televised heat (Episode 12) performing the Diana Ross song "I'm Still Waiting", and appeared on the Live Grand Final, finishing sixth overall, with the show being seen by a record 15 million viewers.

== Motown show ==
Shaw continued to tour professionally for the next 15 years with her live show performing female Motown and soul classics, firstly backed by a seven piece band, but later as a solo artist. During this time various overseas performances have included Spain, Dubai, France, Cyprus and Turkey.

In 2011, Shaw reformed her backing band, and has been touring with them ever since, with various members swapping and changing over the years. Shaw has supported many artists over the years including George McCrae, Sister Sledge, Alexander O'Neal, Clem Curtis, Tommy Hunt and Kirk Whalum.

== Northern soul ==
Numerous times over the last 15 years, Shaw was invited by promoters to perform at various Modern Soul and Northern soul events, and started gathering her own fanbase in the genre, and incorporated covers of some of the big hits into her show, alongside other material. Shaw was an early adopter of sites such as YouTube, and released many videos of her live performances, which helped gain her many more fans wanting to see her live show.

In 2013, Shaw was contacted by original Wigan Casino DJ Russ Winstanley to perform at the 'Wigan Casino 40th Anniversary Concert' and the Butlins Skegness Weekender at Butlins, Skegness. Winstanley also booked the Diane Shaw Band to provide the musical backing for Motown stars; Martha Reeves, Brenda Holloway, and Chris Clark among others. She also arranges all the three-part harmonies for her background singers on visiting artists shows.

== Live shows ==
Some of the many highlights of Shaw's 20 year performing career include the Jazz Cafe in London, the Albert Dock in Liverpool for Smooth Radio and Under the Bridge in London supporting Tito Jackson. In 2014, Shaw performed for a second year at the Butlins Northern Soul Survivors Weekender, as well as backing other artists such as Judy Street, The Flirtations and Eddie Holman.

In July 2015, Shaw and her band supported Tito Jackson on his show in London. Jackson also used Shaw's 12 piece band as the musical backing for his album launch. In September the same year, the Diane Shaw Band returned to the Butlins Soul Survivors Weekender, and perform in front of 8,500 people. Her band also provided the musical backing for artists such as Kim Weston, Brenda Holloway and Prince Philip Mitchell.

In November 2015, Shaw embarked on a 20 date UK Tour with The Stylistics, and performed at venues such as IndigO2 and the Liverpool Philharmonic Hall.

Shaw and her band once again supported Tito Jackson for his UK Show at Butlins in March 2018.

== Debut single ==
In 2014, Diane Shaw's debut single "Leave a Little Love", written by the English songwriter Les Reed, was released through her own record label Mecca Records. During 2015, the single has received various plays on BBC Radio 2 and BBC 6 Music by the DJ Craig Charles, and has also been championed by Tony Blackburn, playlisted on BBC Radio London. Critical acclaim came through an article by soul journalists David Nathan and Sharon Davis.

In June 2017, "The Day I Found Myself" was released as a vinyl 7" single. This was a teaser for the upcoming album Second Chance. The B side contained the London Town Mix of "That Thing You Do".

In the same month, a limited edition Love, Life & Mixes was released, containing remixes and reworks of the 2015 album Love, Life & Strings.

== Albums ==
=== Love, Life & Strings ===
Released in June 2015, her debut album Love, Life & Strings went to No. 1 in the UK Soul Chart, where it stayed for two weeks. Tower Records in Tokyo named it 'The Best Soul Album of the 21st Century' . Reviews include Lois Wilson in Record Collector giving the album 4/5 stars, and Sharon Davis from Soulmusic.com giving it 9/10. Soultracks in the USA also gave the album their highest rating of 'Highly Recommended'.

=== Second Chance ===
Shaw's follow up album Second Chance was released on Mecca Records Manchester on 8 February 2018. The 13 track album included previously unreleased songs, including one written by Michael McDonald and another from the lost Motown archives written by Jimmy Webb. The album entered the UK Soul Chart at No.2. It spent two weeks at No.1 and stayed in the Top 10 for seven weeks. The album was released in Japan on P-Vine Records on 6 June 2018.
