= Skiing in the Snow =

1964 American soul song

Single by The Beach Girls
- B-side: "Goin' Places"
- Released: February 1965
- Recorded: October 1964
- Genre: Surf music
- Label: Dynovox Records
- Songwriter(s): Sandy Linzer, Denny Randell

"Skiing In The Snow" is an American soul song which became adopted by the Northern soul subculture in the UK, written by Sandy Linzer and Denny Randell.

Originally recorded in October 1964 in a surf style by American group The Beach Girls (also known as The Rag Dolls), their version was released on Dynovox Records in February 1965 but failed to chart. The group consisted of Jean Thomas, Mickie Harris and Susan Lewis.

== The Invitations version ==
"Skiing in the Snow"

Single by The Invitations
- B-side: "Why Did My Baby Turn Bad"
- Released: 1966
- Genre: Soul
- Label: Dynovoice Records
- Songwriter(s): Sandy Linzer, Denny Randell

The song was then re-recorded a year later by American group The Invitations in a Black soul style, and released on Dynovoice Records (an alias of Dynovox) a year later. This version also failed to chart.

The song was then forgotten and became 'rarer than a green dog', according to one source 'no one had actually seen a copy or heard it', and it was only 'rumoured to exist'. It is unclear whether it ever obtained any radio play at the time of its release.

In the 1970s, this song was rediscovered by Ian Levine while in Miami and became an extremely popular dance track in Northern soul clubs in England, and was subsequently re-pressed in the UK unofficially. Even though the song was nominally about skiing, many of those in the clubs interpreted some of the lyrics as drug references, perhaps a reason for its popularity.

The Invitations (at the time of the song's release) consisted of Roy Jolly (lead singer), Billy Morris, Robert Rivers, and Wilson 'Gary' Gant. The group also recorded 'What's Wrong With Me Baby', 'Written On The Wall', and 'Hallelujah', none of which were successful, however 'What's Wrong With Me Baby' did receive some radio play in the US on release and was also used in the Northern soul subculture in the UK later on.

== Wigan's Ovation version ==
"Skiing in the Snow"

Single by Wigan's Ovation
- B-side: "Northern Soul Dancer"
- Released: 1975
- Recorded: London, England
- Genre: Northern soul
- Label: Spark
- Songwriter(s): Sandy Linzer, Denny Randell

In an attempt to capitalise on the song's popularity in the Northern soul subculture and 'put Northern soul on the music map for the industry', Russ Winstanley met up with a pop group from Wigan called Sparkle, who renamed themselves Wigan's Ovation and covered the song (with slightly modified lyrics) in 1975.

On 20 March 1975, the band performed the song on Top of the Pops, and went on to perform on the show 13 times. They appeared in baggy trousers decorated with Northern soul badges, and the performance was widely derided as 'uncool' and 'an imitation'.

This recording was extremely controversial and was widely panned by those in the Northern soul scene, who described it as a 'terrible cover version of The Invitations' classic', 'trash', 'bad for Northern soul', '[an] embarrassing novelty single', 'crassly commercial', 'selling out', 'horrible', 'even worse than Footsee', 'dire', 'awful', 'annoying', 'our Vietnam flashback moment', and 'a fucking travesty'. 'Furious' enthusiasts were 'disgusted' that their cover had been blown and particularly disliked the fact that the band's name contained the name of their town, as for many people this performance was their first encounter with the subculture which had previously been kept underground, and many in the industry see the release of this record as a pivotal moment in the decline of Northern soul (the night of the Top of the Pops airing was described as 'the night that Wigan Casino died'). Soon after the release of this record, attendance at the Wigan Casino rapidly increased forcing the venue to stop accepting new members, many of those attending only recently becoming aware of the subculture through the television broadcast.

Stuart Maconie described the song as 'a bland, modernised, easier to license version of a classic Northern tune originally by US artists', and said it 'really stuck in the purists' craw even then'.

Even though the recording 'horrified the purists', the song entered the UK Singles Chart and reached a peak of number 12 on 15 March 1975, and stayed in the chart for 10 weeks.

The band had later hits with "Per-so-nal-ly" and "Super Love", reaching 38 and 41 in the UK chart respectively, however this did not stop the band splitting up in 1976. The band then reformed in 1977 and continued performing until the suicide of their manager in 1984.

=== Chart performance ===
Chart (1975)	Peak position
UK Singles Chart (BMRB)	12
