= Oscar Toney Jr. =

American soul singer (born 1939)

Oscar Toney Jr. (born 26 May 1939, Selma, Alabama, United States) is an American soul singer.

== Career ==
Toney was raised in Columbus, Georgia, United States, and sang gospel in churches while young. In his teens, he joined a gospel group called The Sensational Melodies of Joy, and after this joined secular group called The Searchers (no relation to The Searchers), who released a few singles between 1958 and 1961. In 1964, Toney released a solo single, "Can it All Be Love", on King Records, but did not garner any widespread notice.

Toney then began working with the record producer Papa Don Schroeder, who used Toney as a backup replacement for James & Bobby Purify when one of the two singers was unavailable for a live performance. Schroeder had Toney signed to Bell Records in 1967, and his first single, a cover of "For Your Precious Love" by Jerry Butler & the Impressions, was produced by Chips Moman. The tune would be the first and most successful of Toney's four chart hits. His last single was 1969's "Down in Texas" b/w "Aint That True Love", which failed to chart, and Toney left Bell when Schroeder quit the music industry.

Toney toured the UK a few times during the 1960s, brought to England by agents Henry Sellers and Danny O`Donavan. He insisted after his first tour to have the same backing band which was Merlin Q from London. Merlin Q were Dave Kerr-Clemenson on bass, Andy Locke and Wally Scott on guitars, with Eddie Richards on drums and Denis White on Hammond organ. After their first rehearsal at the Q club in Paddington, Oscar said to Sellers "you said they were good but not that good". The tour included all the Northern soul venues, such as Twisted Wheel Club in Manchester and Golden Torch in Tunstall. After the last tour Kerr-Clemson, Locke, Scott and Richards went on to become Edison Lighthouse.

In 1970, Toney released a single, "Down on My Knees", on Capricorn Records, but the tune did not chart; three more singles, all flops, followed on Capricorn, which dropped the singer in 1973.

Toney's career was tenuous in America, but the British love for Northern soul resulted in a second wind. Later in the 1970s, he was signed to the British record label Contempo Records for six singles and an album, yet none of these sold well, and in the 1980s Toney left the secular industry to focus on gospel again.

== Discography ==
=== Albums ===
- For Your Precious Love (Bell Records, 1967) U.S. No. 192, US R&B Albums No. 27
- I've Been Loving You Too Long To Stop Now!, 1975
- Make It Easy On yourself!, 1975
- Papa Don's Preacher, 1988
- Oscar's Winners, 1998
- Oscar Toney, Jr. Resurfaces!, 2000
- Guilty of Loving You (BGR Records, 2001)

Collaboration: Cliff Ellis & Oscar Toney, Jr Over At Mary's Place, 2008

=== Singles ===
Year	Title	Chart Positions	
Year	Title	US Pop Singles	US R&B Singles
1967	"For Your Precious Love"	23	4
1967	"Turn On Your Love Light"	65	37
1968	"Never Get Enough of Your Love"	95	–
1968	"Without Love (There Is Nothing)"	90	47
