= Lorraine Silver =

English Singer, born 1951

Lorraine Silver (born 15 October 1951 in London) is an English singer, known for her single "Lost Summer Love" (1965), which came to be regarded as a classic of Northern soul.

== Career ==
Silver's singing career began in 1965, when she was thirteen and recorded an a cappella version of Brian Hyland's "Sealed With A Kiss" at a DIY singing booth in Woolworths in Oxford Street, London. The song attracted the attention of Pye Records, who signed her for a two-record deal. For her first single Silver released "Lost Summer Love", a song previously sung by Shelley Fabares. The single was produced by Tony Reeves and arranged by Johnny Harris and featured Klaus Voormann on bass guitar. Another Shelley Fabares cover, "I Know You'll Be There", was recorded for the B-side. Her second single was an original song, "The Happy Faces", with a cover version of The Supremes' "When the Love Light Starts Shining Thru His Eyes" on the B-side. Neither single sold well and Silver's contract was not renewed.

Although the original recordings did not chart, Silver's version of "Lost Summer Love" went on to become popular within the Northern soul movement at the Wigan Casino in the 1970s. The single was reissued on the Casino Classics label, selling in excess of 30,000 copies. Silver, however, remained largely unaware of the song's popularity and her fame within the Northern soul scene until 1988.

All four original recordings have been released on numerous Northern soul compilation CDs, and she also was featured in the best-selling biography of Dusty Springfield written by Lucy O'Brien entitled Dusty.
