= Footsee =

Single by Wigan's Chosen Few
- A-side: "Footsee"
- B-side: "Seven Days Too Long"; by Chuck Wood
- Released: 1974
- Genre: Northern soul
- Label: Pye

"Footsee", credited to Wigan's Chosen Few, was a British hit single in 1975, reaching number 9 on the UK Singles Chart. It is notable as being one of the first commercially successful remixes of a previously released recording.

By late 1974, the Northern soul music and dance scene centered on the Wigan Casino club in Lancashire, England, was attracting increasing attention from mainstream media in the UK, at the same time as original American R&B recordings which met the musical criteria of its fans, and which were new to listeners, were becoming more difficult to find. According to most sources, Dave McAleer, then working for Pye Records' Disco Demand subsidiary label, heard a 1968 single by the obscure Canadian band, The Chosen Few. The record's B-side was a brief instrumental version of the A-side. It had originally been released on the Transworld record label in Canada, and was reissued in the US by Roulette Records (Roulette 7015) as a tie-in with the popular "Footsee" toy (a ball attached by a string to a hoop around the ankle, similar to the Skip-It). Pye held the rights to the Roulette catalogue in the UK, and McAleer arranged for the original instrumental track to be speeded up in the recording studio to the right dance tempo. It was also overdubbed with car horns and crowd noises, which are variously reported to be taken from the 1966 FA Cup final between Everton and Sheffield Wednesday, or alternatively a group of revellers invited into the Pye studio.

Released on the Disco Demand label in late 1974, the remixed and overdubbed record reached the UK chart in January 1975. The B-side was a true Northern soul favourite, "Seven Days Too Long" by Chuck Wood. When "Footsee" was featured on BBC Television's Top of the Pops, dancers from the Wigan Casino gave a demonstration of the Northern Soul style of dancing, in the absence of a real group to promote the record.

Music journalist, Stuart Maconie, described the record as an "embarrassing novelty" and "execrable" in his autobiography, Cider With Roadies.
