= Vince Peach =

Australian radio host and record collector

- Born: Liverpool, England
- Presenting career
- Show: Soul Time
- Station: PBS 106.7FM
- Network: Progressive Broadcasting Service Co-operative Limited
- Time slot: Saturdays 11:00 am – 1:00 pm
- Time slot: Wednesdays 3:00pm to 5:00pm
- Style: Northern soul, Motown and related styles, from the sixties to the modern day.
- Country: Australia

Vince Peach is a soul music enthusiast, record collector, radio presenter and DJ in Melbourne, Australia.

Peach came to Australia from Liverpool in 1982, bringing his vinyl record collection. He presents the program Soul Time on Melbourne radio station PBS FM, which he has presented for 40 years. As a mark of respect, he is sometimes referred to as "Vince 'The Prince' Peach".

Peach was first part of the Mod revival scene in Liverpool, where he travelled every weekend to the Twisted Wheel club and absorbed the beginnings of Northern Soul, evidently taking the role of DJ in the club.

He started playing his music on the Melbourne community radio station PBS FM in 1984 and DJs in venues around Melbourne, and his program Soul Time, is believed to be the longest running soul show in the world. With the introduction of radio streaming through the internet, his program became a focus for fans of across Australia, reaching the strong British diaspora in Perth, Western Australia.

Peach is featured in the ABC Television documentary 25 Years of Soul Time
