= I'm on My Way (Dean Parrish song) =

Single by Dean Parrish
- B-side: "Watch Out"
- Released: 1967
- Genre: Soul, northern soul
- Length: 2:43
- Label: Laurie
- Songwriters: Doug Morris, Eliot Greenberg

"I'm on My Way" is a song and single by American soul singer, Dean Parrish. Written by Doug Morris and Eliot Greenberg, it was first released in the US 1967 without any chart success. It was released in the UK in 1975 and found chart success due to its popularity with the Northern soul scene.

== Background and chart success ==
Released in the US in 1967 on the Laurie label, in the UK in the 1970s, "I'm on My Way" came to the attention of Russ Winstanley, a disc jockey at the Wigan Casino. He began playing the record and it became one of the more popular records at the venue. It was re-released in 1975 on the UK Records label and was the last record to be played every week at the Wigan Casino. The single reached number 38 in the UK Singles Chart in February 1975. Wigan Casino's spin-off record label Casino Classics re-released it on the Three Before Eight EP in 1978 and Casino Classics: Chapter One compilation in 1979. The Wigan Casino closed in 1981 and "I'm on My Way" was the last record ever played there. Parrish had remained unaware of the song's revival having stopped performing in the 1960s.

Since its success, it has had a regular presence on Northern soul compilation albums, and is considered one of the most popular songs of the Northern soul genre.
