= The Casualeers =

American vocal soul group

- Origin: Suffolk County, New York, USA
- Genres: Soul, Northern soul
- Years active: 1967–1968
- Labels: Roulette; Laurie; Pye International Disco Demand
- Past members: Arnold Davis; Ollie Johnson; Peppy DuBois; Mike Furr

The Casualeers were an American vocal soul group of the 1960s. They came from the Copiague and Amityville areas of Suffolk County, New York. Their music became popular in the United Kingdom in the 1970s within Northern soul clubs.

Their song "Dance, Dance, Dance" from 1967 is considered a classic within the Northern soul genre and it has been re-released on over 15 Northern soul compilation albums. It was described at the time of its release by Billboard as, "solid dance beat and a good groovy workout". Copies of this single commanded high prices when traded among Northern soul fans in the 1970s. Such was the demand for the song that it was re-released in 1974 on the Pye International Disco Demand label.

Mike Furr died on May 24, 2026, at the age of 84.
