= Golden Torch =

Former nightclub in England

Coordinates: 53°03′32″N 2°12′41″W

The Golden Torch
- The Torch
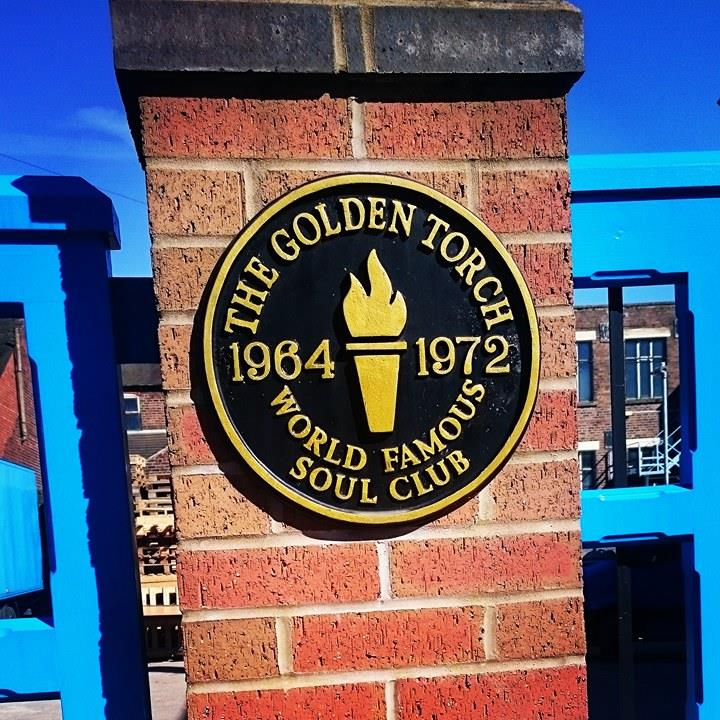
- A commemorative plaque placed at the venue's former site
- Interactive map of The Golden Torch
- Location: Tunstall, Stoke-on-Trent, England
- Owner: Christopher Burton
- Type: Nightclub, music venue
- Events: Northern soul, live music

Construction
- Opened: 1964
- Closed: 1973

The Golden Torch, more commonly known as The Torch, was a nightclub in Tunstall, Stoke-on-Trent, England. Opened as a mod venue, it later became important to fans of Northern soul with their all-nighters. Peter Stringfellow was amongst the many DJs who at some time had a residency there while the main soul all-nighter DJs included Keith Minshull, Colin Curtis, Alan Day and Martyn Ellis

== History ==
The building was located on Hose Street, behind the Sneyd Arms Hotel on Tower Square in Tunstall. It started as a church, before becoming a roller skating rink, and in the 1940s, the Little Regent Cinema. It featured marble pillars, and a balcony overlooking the dance floor. Retaining the original features, the cinema was converted into a mod club by Christopher Burton—a contemporary of Ivor Abadi (founder of the Twisted Wheel.) The club was opened on 30 January 1965 by headliners Billy J. Kramer and the Dakotas. Acts such as the Kinks and Wayne Fontana followed. In 1967, after a performance by visiting soul music artists Inez and Charlie Foxx, the Golden Torch became a major soul venue, with a similar clientele to Manchester's Twisted Wheel.

After the closure of the Twisted Wheel in 1971, Chris Burton took up Keith Minshull and Colin Curtis' suggestion of Saturday Northern soul all-nighters at the Torch, holding its first on 11 March 1972. The Torch's all-nighters proved a massive success, running from 8 pm Saturday to 8 am Sunday. Although the building was designed to hold a maximum of 500, a record 1,300 people attended an all-nighter in 1973. Artists who performed live included the Drifters, the Stylistics, Oscar Toney Jr, the Chi-Lites and Edwin Starr.

However, it became a victim of its own success, with regular police presences, drug-taking and overcrowding. When the club came to renew its licence on 16 March 1973, Stoke-on-Trent council refused the renewal; without a licence the club simply faded away. The building afterwards burned down in a fire. Following a public appeal led by former club barman and part-time DJ John O'Brien, and his friend Steve Hoskins a plaque now commemorates the club on Hose Street. The closure paved the way for the Wigan Casino, now without any real rivals, to become internationally famous as the UK's foremost Northern soul club, until local council antipathy forced it, too, to close, in 1981.

== See also ==
- Wigan Casino
- Twisted Wheel
- Tunstall
