= The Adventures of Priscilla, Queen of the Desert (soundtrack) =

The Adventures of Priscilla, Queen of the Desert: Original Motion Picture Soundtrack

Soundtrack album by Various Artists
- Released: 1994
- Genre: Disco link
- Length: 1:06:36
- Label: Polygram

Professional ratings
Review scores
| Source | Rating |
|---|---|
| Allmusic | link |

There were two soundtrack albums recorded by Polydor Records (Australia) at Trackdown Digital for Stephan Elliott's 1994 Academy Award-winning film The Adventures of Priscilla, Queen of the Desert. The first consists of tracks for the film that were sourced from hit records and the second is the original music score composed by leading Australian film composer Guy Gross.

== Sourced Music Soundtrack listing ==
=== The Adventures of Priscilla, Queen of the Desert: Original Motion Picture Soundtrack ===
1. "I've Never Been to Me" – Charlene (3:53)
2. "Go West" – Village People (3:33)
3. "Billy, Don't Be a Hero" – Paper Lace (3:43)
4. "My Baby Loves Lovin'" – White Plains (2:44)
5. "I Love the Nightlife (Disco 'Round)" – Alicia Bridges (3:25)
6. "Can't Help Lovin' Dat Man" – Trudy Richards (2:39)
7. "I Will Survive" – Gloria Gaynor (3:18)
8. "A Fine Romance" – Lena Horne (3:12)
9. "Shake Your Groove Thing (Original Mix)" – Peaches & Herb (5:32)
10. "I Don't Care If the Sun Don't Shine" – Patti Page (2:42)
11. "Finally (7" Choice Mix)" – CeCe Peniston (4:08)
12. "Take a Letter Maria" – R. B. Greaves (2:42)
13. "Mamma Mia" – ABBA (3:32)
14. "Save the Best for Last" – Vanessa L. Williams (3:38)
15. "I Love the Nightlife (Disco 'Round) (Real Rapino 7" Mix)" – Alicia Bridges (3:31)
16. "Go West (Original 12" Mix)" – Village People (6:34)
17. "I Will Survive (1993 Phil Kelsey Classic 12" Mix)" – Gloria Gaynor (4:51)
18. "Shake Your Groove Thing (Original 12" Mix)" – Peaches & Herb (6:38)
19. "I Love the Nightlife (Disco 'Round) (Phillip Damien Extended Vox)" – Alicia Bridges (6:20)

=== Weekly charts ===
| Chart (1994/95) | Peak position |
|---|---|
| Australian Albums (ARIA) | 1 |

=== Year-end charts ===
| Chart (1994) | Position |
|---|---|
| Australian Albums (ARIA) | 4 |
| Chart (1995) | Position |
| Australian Albums (ARIA) | 48 |

== Certifications ==
| Region | Certification | Certified units/sales |
|---|---|---|
| Australia (ARIA) | 4× Platinum | 280,000^{^} |
| United Kingdom (BPI) | Silver | 60,000^{^} |
^{^} Shipments figures based on certification alone.

== Original Music Score Soundtrack listing ==
=== The Adventures of Priscilla, Queen of the Desert. The Priscilla Companion: Dialogue from the film & Original Music Score by Guy Gross ===
1. "Trumpet" composed by Guy Gross, choral arrangement Derek Williams (2:55)
2. "Desert Holiday" composed by Guy Gross (2:48)
3. "Campfire" composed by Guy Gross, choral arrangement Derek Williams, soprano solo Robyne Dunn (2:16)
4. "All Dolled Up and Nowhere to Go" composed by Guy Gross (2:00)
5. "Outback Awe" composed by Guy Gross, choral arrangement Derek Williams (1:21)
6. "Excerpt from La Traviata" composed by Giuseppe Verdi (2:23)
7. "Where the Fuk-A-Wie?" composed by Guy Gross, choral arrangement Derek Williams (2:52)
8. "Bernie's Walk" composed by Guy Gross, choral arrangement Derek Williams, soprano solo Robyne Dunn (3:20)
9. "Fernando" composed by Björn Ulvaeus, Benny Andersson, Stig Anderson (2:43)
10. "Kite Opera" composed by Guy Gross, choral arrangement Derek Williams soprano solo Robyne Dunn (1:30)
11. "Cynthia's Last Dance" composed by Guy Gross (1:47)
12. "Water Hole" composed by Guy Gross, choral arrangement Derek Williams (2:05)
13. "Fight" composed by Guy Gross (1:57)
14. "Man One Day, Woman the Next" composed by Guy Gross, choral arrangement Derek Williams (3:03)
15. "Hava Nagila" arranged by Guy Gross (2:06)
16. "The Climb" composed by Guy Gross, choral arrangement Derek Williams soprano solo Robyne Dunn

All music composed by Guy Gross, published by Mushroom Music Australia, except:

- "I Don't Care If the Sun Don't Shine", composed by Mack David, Published by Polygram International.
- "Hava Nagila" (trad.), arranged by Guy Gross.
- La Traviata: "'EStrano! Ah Fors E. Lui', Act I Violetta", composed by Giuseppe Verdi, sung by Joan Carden, courtesy of ABC Classics.
- "Fernando", composed by Benny Andersson, Björn Ulvaeus and Stig Anderson, published by Union Songs.
