= Charlene (singer) =

American easy-listening and R&B singer

- Born: Charlene Marilynn D'Angelo; June 1, 1950 (age 76); Los Angeles, California, U.S.
- Other names: Charlene Duncan; Charlene Oliver
- Occupations: Singer; songwriter; record producer; author
- Spouses: Larry Duncan (m. 1967–1981) Jeff Oliver (m. 1982)
- Children: 3
- Musical career
- Origin: Hollywood, California
- Genres: Easy listening, R&B
- Instruments: Vocals, piano
- Years active: 1973–present
- Labels: Motown; Prodigal; Gotham; Chapel Lane

Charlene Marilynn Oliver (née D'Angelo; born June 1, 1950), better known by the artist mononym Charlene, is an American easy-listening and R&B singer famous for the song "I've Never Been to Me", which, after its unsuccessful 1977 debut release, became a worldwide hit upon a re-release in 1982 and has remained an enduring adult contemporary music staple. Charlene is also a songwriter, record producer, and author.

== Early career ==
Charlene Marilynn D'Angelo was born June 1, 1950, in Hollywood, California. As an infant, she battled meningitis. She married at age 16, dropped out of high school and soon became a young mother.

Her musical career began as a backup singer for Petula Clark at Caesars Palace in Las Vegas.

After an impromptu audition for Berry Gordy in 1973, she signed with Motown and, using the moniker "Charlene Duncan" (her married name), released at age 23 two unsuccessful singles: "Relove/Give It One More Try" (M 1262) in July 1973 and in January 1974 a cover of "All That Love Went to Waste" (M 1285) from the film A Touch of Class.

Charlene sought to find her niche at Motown by writing her own songs, doing demos for other artists (including Michael Jackson's "One Day in Your Life"), and working with various producers and writers before finally being teamed up with Ron Miller.

=== Charlene and Songs of Love ===
When Charlene's self-titled debut album (P6 10015S1) was released in November 1976 on Motown's Prodigal label, her artist name was shortened to Charlene and appeared as such on the cover, but confusingly the album still had "Charlene Duncan" printed on the spine. In March 1977, the first single, "It Ain't Easy Comin' Down" (P 0632F), went to #97 on the Hot 100 and #23 on AC.

In May 1977, an album entitled Songs of Love (Prodigal, P610018S1) (with cover artwork by Patrick Nagel) was issued. It was a repackaged version of Charlene with "Freddie" (an apparent tribute to Freddie Prinze, who had died that year) replacing "Shake a Hand" and the songs re-sequenced. Also, there is no spoken bridge in "I've Never Been to Me". "Freddie" was released as a single (P 0633F) and reached #96 in the Hot 100 (and #40 on the AC).

A third single from the Charlene/Songs of Love collections would turn out to have not only an unusual lyrical evolution but also an unexpected chart odyssey. The lyrics to "I've Never Been to Me" were originally written by Ron Miller from a male perspective, but he rewrote them from a woman's viewpoint for Charlene; and on her debut album, the ballad was recorded with a controversial narration to underscore the song's sentiment. On Songs of Love, the track omitted the spoken bridge; when this take was released as a single (P 0636F), it spent only three weeks on the Hot 100 and peaked at #97 in October 1977. When the song was revived in 1982, the rendition with the monologue (from the Charlene LP) was being played on radio, so it was the version that Motown reissued.

=== Second unreleased album ===
In 1978, a Charlene recording entitled "Are You Free", again produced by Ron Miller, appeared as a promotional single for the music label Ariola Records America. In addition to the Charlene/Songs of Love project, Charlene recorded for Motown a full album's length of material that was never even issued. In June 1980, Motown released one more single, "Hungry / I Won't Remember Ever Loving You" (M 1492F). The track "Hungry" was taken from the stage musical Daddy Goodness, and both cuts on the single were from the same collaborators of her biggest hit. However, this attempt failed, and Motown decided to release the singer from its label.

== Success of "I've Never Been to Me" ==
Charlene recorded "I've Never Been to Me" in 1976, and it reached #97 on the US Billboard Hot 100 singles chart in 1977. Five years later, the song became an unexpected sleeper hit. When released again in 1982, the single (1611 MF) spent 20 weeks on the Hot 100, peaked at #3, and stayed there for three weeks. It also reached #7 on AC and #60 on Hot Country Songs. The song has been her only top 40 hit.

In 1982, Scott Shannon, a disc jockey then working at Tampa radio station WRBQ-FM, began playing the version from the Charlene album (with the original spoken bridge) at the behest of his girlfriend, and response from local listeners was such as to motivate Shannon, a former Motown employee, to alert Motown president Jay Lasker of the track's hit potential. By this time, Charlene had lost her recording contract, moved to the United Kingdom, and was working in a sweetshop in Ilford in London. Upon locating Charlene, Lasker personally telephoned her to invite her to re-sign with Motown in order to facilitate the re-release of "I've Never Been to Me".

In 1976, Charlene's legal name was Charlene Duncan from her marriage to record producer Larry Duncan; shortly following the song's re-release in 1982, her name became Charlene Oliver by her subsequent marriage to Englishman Jeff Oliver, whom she wed on March 27, 1982. The song's music video was filmed at Blickling Hall, Norfolk, England, with Charlene appearing in her actual wedding dress.

"I've Never Been to Me" was one of the year's biggest hits and experienced international success, becoming popular in 26 countries around the globe. It reached the #1 spot in the UK, Canada (4 weeks), Ireland (3 weeks) and Australia (6 weeks). It was also a top ten triumph in Norway, Belgium, New Zealand, and the Netherlands. In addition, "I've Never Been to Me" became Motown's first top ten hit by a white female solo singer. (Only after leaving and suing Motown Records did Teena Marie score in 1985 with "Lovergirl".) Charlene even became one of a handful of artists on Motown Latino when she issued a Spanish-language cover of her hit called "Nunca he ido a mi" (1624LF).

The song ranked at No. 38 on the Billboard Year-End Hot 100 singles of 1982 list.

The concurrent release of her album, I've Never Been to Me (Motown 6009 ML), was also relatively successful, peaking at no. 36 on Billboard's Top 200. The LP mixed previously recorded tracks with some new material and featured two different album covers: one showed Charlene in an elegant white dress with a bow and the other used her image in a moody pastel rendering.

== Subsequent recordings and releases ==
=== The Last American Virgin soundtrack ===
"It Ain't Easy Comin' Down" was recycled on the I've Never Been to Me LP and re-released as its second, follow-up single (1621 MF). The 1982 bid bubbled under at #109 in America but did ascend to #8 on the Norwegian charts. Radio airplay affixed an ending harmony, "It ain't easy without you," which is not on the album version. This rendition (with the extra harmony) was also used in the 1982 film The Last American Virgin. Although the original Virgin compilation did not contain the cut, "It Ain't Easy Comin' Down" was subsequently added to the 2004 extended edition of the soundtrack.

=== The Sky Is the Limit ===
When Charlene re-signed with Motown in 1982, Motown agreed not only to the mainstream production of a brand new album of material but also to the U.S. release of a religious set she had already started with Chapel Lane Records in England. The 1982 outing, The Sky Is the Limit (Motown 6024 ML), offers reflective gospel music with several songs penned by Charlene herself plus a cover of Lionel Richie's "Jesus Is Love".

=== Used to Be ===
Toward the end of the year, Charlene also released a new single, a duet with Stevie Wonder entitled "Used to Be" (1650 MF), which the authors-composers of "I've Never Been to Me" also wrote and composed. But it stalled in the Hot 100 at #46 (and reached #31 on the AC and #35 on the R&B). However, "Used to Be" did go to #13 on the Swiss Hitparade charts in December 1982. The controversial lyrics of "Used to Be", which lamented an uncaring, self-centered society, caused some radio stations in the U.S. to refuse to play the single and facilitated its actual ban in England. The lines deemed most unacceptable were delivered by Wonder in the song's first verse: "Have another Chivas Regal/You're 12-years old and sex is legal." Peaking at #162 on Billboard's Top 200, Charlene's corresponding Used to Be album (Motown 6027 ML) was not as successful as the I've Never Been to Me LP. Highlights of Used to Be included the ethereal love ballad "Rainbows", which was also used in the 1983 TV movie Happy Endings (where it was sung by Catherine Hicks); a rendition of "You're Home", which had previously appeared in the stage musical Daddy Goodness, and a cover of the gospel anthem "Heaven Help Us All," originally popularized by Stevie Wonder. Whereas Wonder's version of "Heaven" used the terms "black man" and "white man", Charlene's take altered the words to "poor man" and "rich man".

=== Hit & Run Lover ===
In 1984, Charlene co-produced a new LP, Hit & Run Lover (6090ML), which showcased primarily up-tempo dance music and separated her from perennial producer Ron Miller and the Miller-Hirsch writing team credited with much of her catalog. Although Charlene was offered the power ballad "We Belong", which soon after became a big hit for Pat Benatar, the song's inclusion on the album was opposed by executive producer Ray Singleton.

=== The Last Dragon soundtrack ===
Motown furthered its attempt to revamp Charlene's image to appeal to new audiences by highlighting her in a segment of the film The Last Dragon, which was under development by Motown founder Berry Gordy. She and other Motown artists, including DeBarge and Vanity, were strategically placed in the film to appeal to the MTV craze of the time. Charlene's catchy pop song "Fire" was used along with a music video depicting her as a goddess. Although the film managed to improve some of the other artists' standing, by this time, Motown was turning to artists who were offering up the New Jack Swing sound that would dominate the late 1980s and early 1990s. This trend left Charlene and other Motown artists behind. Charlene's appearance in the film did not improve her popularity, and she was dropped from the Motown roster once again in 1985.

== Post-Motown career ==
Charlene's songwriting was featured on the NBC soap opera Passions and in the 2011 holiday film 12 Wishes of Christmas.

In 2004, she completed a tour of the U.K. with Kiki Dee.

As of 2012, Charlene was residing in her native California with her family and was still actively recording. Under the name Charlene Oliver, she launched a website where her new dance/club/house music could be downloaded and which included such new releases as "Broken Woman," "California Dreamin'" (Dance), "Emotional Scars," "I Wanna Be a Woman," "I Was You," "I've Never Been to Me" (Dance), "Oh Cecilia," "Sea of Tranquility," "Spirit of Woman," "Symphony for a Broken Piano," "There I'll Be" and "(Why Can't) Time Stand Still". In 2012, Charlene revamped a new video, attached to her club mix of "I've Never Been to Me", which could be found on media outlets such as YouTube.

Charlene has also written three books: an autobiography (with Jordan Paramor), a children's book, and the World War II-inspired novel Orphan Train.

In 2013, Charlene was scheduled to release a new album through Gotham Records after a single called "Heard You on the Radio" became available on iTunes on 22 October 2012.

In May 2021, she released a new single called "Destiny", accessible on streaming services.

In 2022, Paul Stuart Davies, a British soul singer who had already worked with other Motown artists, contacted Charlene via social media to let her know that her signature song was #1 on the day he was born. Although they had not met in person, Charlene and Davies virtually composed and recorded a duet together called "Fairytale Life", which became available on iTunes on September 23, 2022.

== Legacy ==
Over the years, memorable performances of and references to "I've Never Been to Me" have appeared on TV shows such as Will & Grace, Desperate Housewives, The Simpsons, This Is Us and The Flight Attendant and in films such as Shrek the Third in 2007 and You Were Never Really Here in 2017. In the 2018 episode of Splitting Up Together entitled "Asking for a Friend", Jenna Fischer's Lena longingly begins singing the song to her children, and her performance prompts her youngest son, Milo, to question aloud if his mother is having a nervous breakdown.

A popular choice for drag performers, "I've Never Been to Me" was spotlighted as the opening number to the 1994 movie The Adventures of Priscilla, Queen of the Desert. The scene depicted Hugo Weaving's Mitzi Del Bra lip-syncing in drag to Charlene's vocals. Charlene's original version of the sentimental ballad is also included on the soundtrack.

Because of her one big hit, Charlene became known as a high-profile one-hit wonder. In 2002, she was featured on VH1's 100 Greatest One-Hit Wonders show, where she ranked #75. It was stated in the program that her entry "expresses the post-'70s hangover". In 2006, "I've Never Been to Me" was released on SingStar Anthems, one of the popular SingStars. Charlene has re-released the song in the form of a downloadable dance remix. "Used to Be" (#4) and "I've Never Been to Me" (#3) both made the top ten in Jimmy Guterman and Owen O'Donnell's 1991 book The Worst Rock n' Roll Records of All Time.

== Personal life ==
Charlene has one sibling, a sister.

Charlene has been married twice. Her first marriage to music producer Larry Duncan ended in divorce. Larry Duncan died in 2024. He was the father of Charlene's first child.

Charlene has three daughters and several grandchildren.

With her second and current husband Jeff Oliver, Charlene has been the co-operator of a legal document assistance agency servicing clients in and around Los Angeles County.

In 2020, Charlene was living in Fort Worth, Texas, where she taught piano as an instructor at the Creative Soul Music School.

== Discography ==
=== Albums ===
Title	Year	Record label	Peak chart positions					
Title	Year	Record label	US	US R&B	AUS	NLD	NOR	UK
Charlene	1976	Prodigal	—	—	—	—	—	—
Songs of Love	1977	Prodigal	—	—	—	—	—	—
I've Never Been to Me	1982	Motown	36	—	40	31	21	43
The Sky Is the Limit	1982	Motown/Chapel Lane	—	—	—	—	—	—
Used to Be	1982	Motown	162	48	—	—	—	—
Hit & Run Lover	1984	Motown	—	—	—	—	—	—
"—" denotes releases that did not chart.

=== Singles ===
Title	Year	Peak chart positions												Certifications	Album
Title	Year	US	US AC	US R&B	UK	AUS	CAN	BEL	SWI	IRE	NLD	NOR	NZ	Certifications	Album
"Relove" (b/w "Give It One More Try")	1973	—	—	—	—	—	—	—	—	—	—	—	—		Non-album singles
"All That Love Went to Waste" (b/w "Give It One More Try")	1974	—	—	—	—	—	—	—	—	—	—	—	—		Non-album singles
"It Ain't Easy Comin' Down"	1977	97	23	—	—	—	—	—	—	—	—	—	—		Charlene
"Freddie"	1977	96	40	—	—	—	—	—	—	—	—	—	—		Songs of Love
"I've Never Been to Me"	1977	97	—	—	—	—	—	—	—	—	—	—	—		Songs of Love
"Hungry" (from the Broadway musical Daddy Goodness)	1980	—	—	—	—	—	—	—	—	—	—	—	—		Non-album single
"I've Never Been to Me" (re-release)	1982	3	7	—	1	1	1	7	—	1	7	5	5	BPI: Silver; ARIA: Gold	I've Never Been to Me
"It Ain't Easy Comin' Down" (re-release)	1982	109	—	—	—	—	—	—	—	—	—	8	—		I've Never Been to Me
"Nunca he ido a mi"	1982	—	—	—	—	—	—	—	—	—	—	—	—		Non-album single
"Used to Be" (featuring Stevie Wonder)	1982	46	31	35	—	71	—	—	13	—	—	—	—		Used to Be
"I Want to Go Back There Again"	1982	—	—	—	—	—	—	—	—	—	—	—	—		Used to Be
"We're Both in Love with You"	1984	—	—	—	—	—	—	—	—	—	—	—	—		Hit & Run Lover
"Hit & Run Lover"	1984	—	—	—	—	—	—	—	—	—	—	—	—		Hit & Run Lover
"I've Never Been to Me" (Dance Version with Rap)	2002	—	—	—	—	—	—	—	—	—	—	—	—		Non-album singles
"I've Never Been to Me" (Club/House Mix)	2012	—	—	—	—	—	—	—	—	—	—	—	—		Non-album singles
"Heard You on the Radio"	2013	—	—	—	—	—	—	—	—	—	—	—	—		Non-album singles
“Sea Of Tranquillity”	2020	—	—	—	—	—	—	—	—	—	—	—	—		Non-album singles
"Destiny"	2021	—	—	—	—	—	—	—	—	—	—	—	—		Non-album singles
“Broken Society”	2021	—	—	—	—	—	—	—	—	—	—	—	—		Non-album singles
“Why Can’t Time Stand Still”	2022	—	—	—	—	—	—	—	—	—	—	—	—		Non-album singles
"Fairytale Life" (with Paul Stuart Davies)	2022	—	—	—	—	—	—	—	—	—	—	—	—		Non-album singles
“Divide of Ten” (with Rían)	2026	—	—	—	—	–	–	–	–	—	—	—	—		Non-album singles
“Oh, Cecilia”	2026	—	—	—	—	—	—	—	—	—	—	—	—		

=== Soundtrack appearances ===
Name	Year	Song title by Charlene
The Last American Virgin (Expanded Edition – 2004)	1982	"It Ain't Easy Comin' Down"
The Last Dragon	1985	"Fire"
The Adventures of Priscilla, Queen of the Desert	1994	"I've Never Been to Me"
Me Without You	2001	"I've Never Been to Me"
