= Trudy Richards =

American jazz musician

Gertrude "Trudy" Moreault
- Born: Gertrude Richards; April 25, 1920; Manhattan, New York City, U.S.
- Died: April 4, 2008 (aged 87); New York City, U.S.
- Occupation: Singer
- Spouse: Henri Moreault (m. circa 1960's - 2008; her death)
- Children: Richard Shorr
- Relatives: Grace Frankenburg (sister)

Gertrude "Trudy" Richards Moreault (born Gertrude Richards, April 25, 1920 – April 4, 2008) was an American jazz and swing singer. She was known for her various recordings in the 1950s and 1960s working with various orchestras such as the Sy Oliver orchestra and the Charlie Barnet orchestra.

== Early life ==
Gertrude Richards Moreault was born Gertrude Richards on April 25, 1920 in Manhattan, New York City. Details about her family life are unknown, but she did have one sister, Grace Frankenburg. She grew up in Manhattan during the 1920s, surrounded by the city's vibrant cultural milieu, including the emerging jazz scenes of Harlem and Manhattan, exposing her to the city's musical culture. Richards' initial interest in singing was sparked early, leading to her professional debut at age ten on the popular radio program Horn and Hardart Children's Hour, where she performed for three years and gained foundational experience in vocal delivery and audience engagement. This exposure to live radio entertainment introduced her to the rhythms and improvisational elements of jazz, fostering a deep admiration for the genre's emotional depth. She briefly paused her career at thirteen to focus on academic and musical studies, attending Hunter College. Her career resumed during college after a prank introduction at Leon and Eddie's nightclub led to a contract there. She was later spotted by Freddie Slack and hired to sing with his orchestra. Her first notable recording appearance came in April 1949, providing background vocals alongside Dave Lambert and Buddy Stewart on the bebop novelty track "Be-Bop Spoken Here" with Charlie Barnet's orchestra, as well as vocals on other tracks such as "Gloomy Sunday", "Easy Living" and "Ill Wind". She was signed by Decca Records as a solo artist, recording such songs as "Nashville Blues" and Blacksmith Blues with Sy Oliver and his orchestra. She also recorded for Derby Records, MGM Records and Jubilee Records. She then signed with Capitol Records, releasing the album Crazy In Love! with Billy May's orchestra in 1957.

She worked with such musicians as Doc Severinsen, Maynard Ferguson, George Barnes, Pete Rugolo, Artie Shaw, and Dave McKenna, and performed at clubs including Freddy's, Jan Wallman's and La Chansonette. Following her marriage to Henri Moreault, she relaunched her career as Trudy Richards Moreau for a second series of albums on such labels as Musicor Records, Black Swan, and Beekman Place.

Her recording of "Can't Help Lovin' Dat Man" was used in the soundtrack of the movie The Adventures of Priscilla, Queen of the Desert.

== Personal life and death ==
Richards died on April 4, 2008 at the age of 87. She was pre-deceased by her son Richard Shorr and her sister Grace Frankenburg.

== Discography ==
Singles

- "Nashville Blues" (Decca Records)
- "Hawaii" / "Wha'd'ya Say?" (MGM Records)
- "I'll Never Love You" / "Somewhere, Somehow, Someday",(MGM Records)
- "I'm Afraid to Love You" / "Winter Waltz" (MGM Records)
- "I Am Loved" / "Where Oh Where" (MGM Records)
- "I'll Be All Smiles Tonight" / "That's How Our Love Will Grow" (MGM Records)
- "Blacksmith Blues" / "Any Time" (Decca Records)
- "I Never Loved Anyone But You" / "I Don't Mind" (Decca Records)
- "I May Hate Myself in the Morning" / "I Waited a Little Too Long" (Decca Records)
- "I'm Never Satisfied" / "Some Folks Do and Some Folks Don't" (Decca Records)
- "A Fool" / "Go 'Way From My Window" (Decca Records)
- "The Breeze" / "Can't Love You Anymore" (Derby Records)
- "Bye Bye Blackbird" / "I Believe What I Feel" (Derby Records)
- "Sugar-Loaf Junction" / "T'aint Nobody's Bizness" (Derby Records)
- "The Song is You" / "It's Been So Long" (Arco Records)
- "Temptation" / "Travelin' Home" (Arco Records)
- "Paradise" / "Once Upon a Dream" (Capitol Records)
- "Next Time" / "All of My Life" (Capitol Records)
- "Wishbone" / "Hangin' Around" (Capitol Records)
- "I Want a Big Butter and Egg Man" / "Weaker Than Wise" (Capitol Records)
- "The Night When Love Was Born" / "Somebody Just Like You",(Capitol Records)
- "Don't Rush Me" / "Promises, Promises" (Jubilee Records)
- "Mercy (Have Mercy)" / "Strangers" (Jubilee Records)
- "I Want You to Be My Baby" / "I'll Never Stop Loving You"
- "24 Hours a Day" (Ronnex Records)
- "My Boy Flat Top" (Ronnex Records)

Albums

- Crazy in Love (Capitol, 1957)
- Trudy (Musicor, 1977) (as Trudy Richards Moreault)
- Two for the Music (Black Swan, 1984)
- Manhattan Serenade (CD release, Beekman Place Records, 1990)
- Charlie Barnet - The Capitol Big Band Sessions (compilation CD)
