= Tommy Hunt =

American singer (1933–2025)

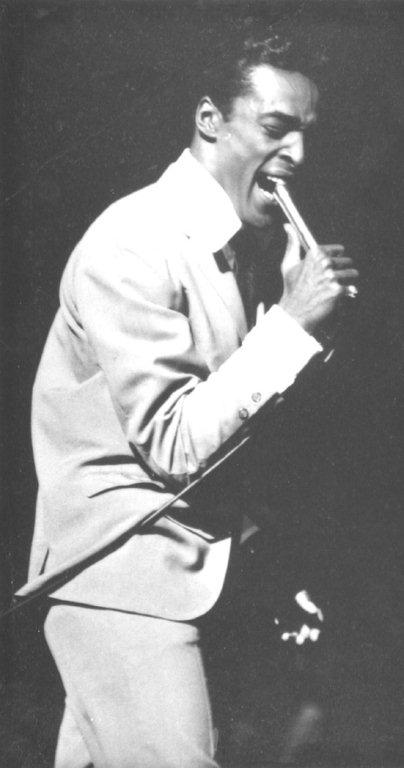
- Hunt in 1962

Background information
- Birth name: Thomas James Hunt
- Born: June 18, 1933; Pittsburgh, Pennsylvania, U.S.
- Died: February 12, 2025 (aged 91)
- Occupation: Singer
- Labels: Sabre, Decca, End, Scepter, Capitol, Dynamo, Polydor, Spark

Charles James Hunt (June 18, 1933 – February 12, 2025) was an American soul and northern soul singer, and a 2001 Rock and Roll Hall of Fame Inductee as a member of famed R&B group the Flamingos.

== Early life ==
Born to Georgianna Derico on June 18, 1933, Hunt started his life in Pittsburgh, Pennsylvania, where his school friends nicknamed him Tommy, a name that stayed with him throughout his entire life. Although music dominated his formative years, as he spent those years practicing for and entering multiple talent shows, he ended up being sent to reform school while still an elementary school student. Released from that school when he was ten, he and his mother subsequently relocated to Chicago.

== The Flamingos ==
After a stint in the United States Air Force, Hunt went AWOL in order to be with his mother, who was dying. He served time in prison for deserting and, after his release, returned to Chicago where he formed a group called the Five Echoes. While performing in a nightclub, he was approached by Zeke Carey of the Flamingos, and was asked to take Carey's place, as Carey had recently been drafted. Hunt was kept on after Carey returned.

In 1959, the group's biggest hit record was "I Only Have Eyes for You".

== Solo career ==
Hunt left the group in 1961 due to musical differences, but within three days he was approached by Luther Dixon and released "Parade of Broken Hearts" which was slow to be picked up by the radio stations. In New York, a disc jockey called Jocko Henderson introduced the song but played the B-side by mistake. The track aired was "Human", Hunt's biggest hit in the U.S. His 1962 B-side, "I Just Don't Know What to Do with Myself", written by Burt Bacharach and Hal David, and produced by Leiber and Stoller, was the first recording of the song, which later became a major hit for Dusty Springfield, Dionne Warwick and others.

Hunt became a regular performer at The Apollo in New York alongside such artists as Jackie Wilson, Marvin Gaye, Ray Charles, Diana Ross and the Supremes, the Shirelles, Dionne Warwick, Chuck Berry, Bo Diddley, and Sam and Dave. By 1969, he traveled back to Germany, through Belgium and across the English Channel to the United Kingdom.

== Northern soul ==
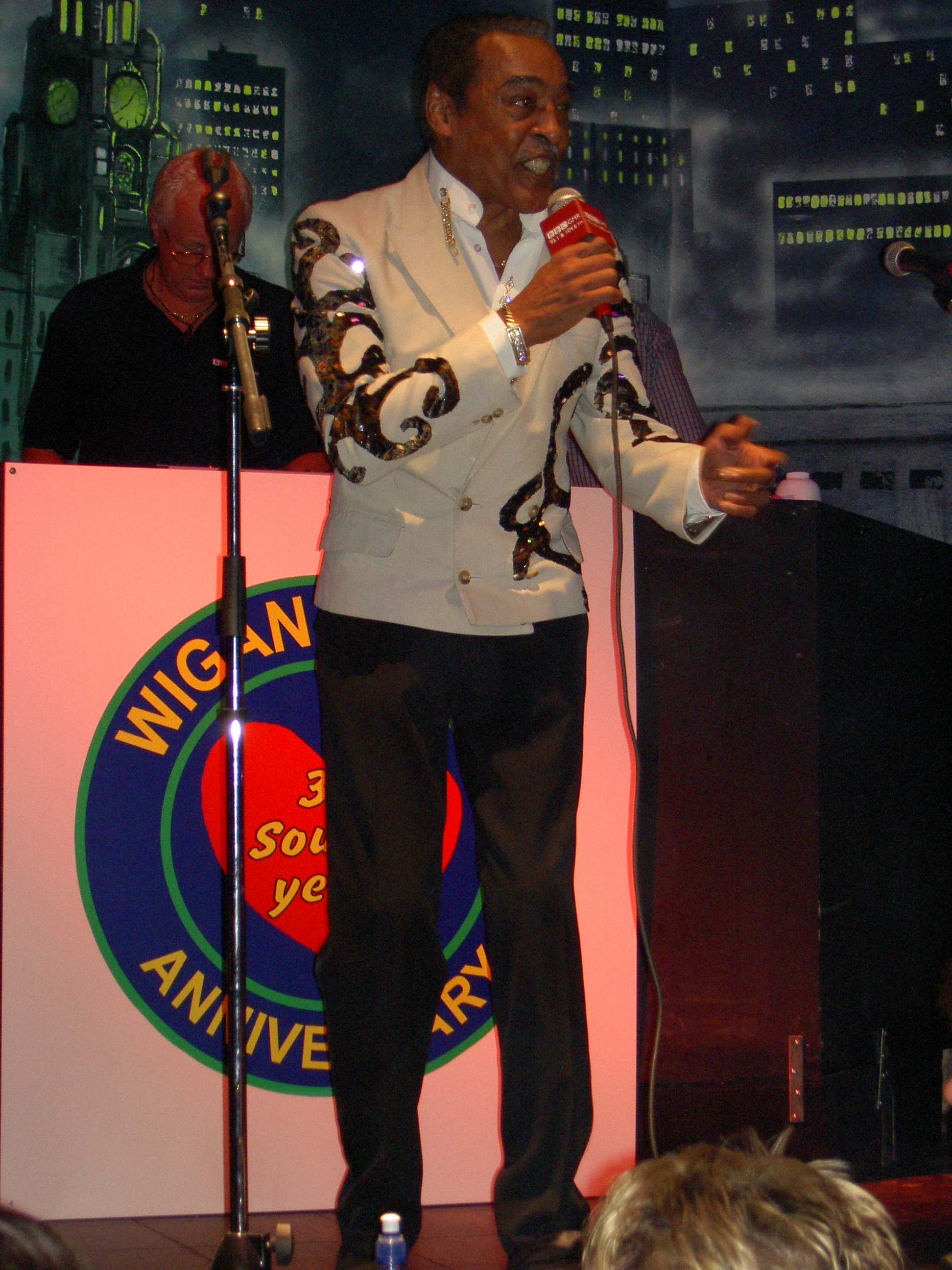
Hunt in 2002

After several performances in the theater clubs throughout the UK, Hunt sang at the second anniversary of the Wigan Casino, and there followed success on the northern soul scene. Hunt was approached by Russ Winstanley and Mike Walker of the Casino, and released several hits on Spark Records. The first was a cover version of a song formerly sung by Roy Hamilton, titled "Crackin' Up". It peaked at No. 39 in the UK Singles Chart in October 1975. This was followed by another chart success "Loving on the Losing Side" (UK No. 28, 1976). 1982/83 saw Hunt win the Male Vocalist of the Year, presented by Club Mirror. His track, "One Fine Morning", reached No. 44 in the UK chart in December 1976.

== Later years ==
With the decline of the northern soul, Hunt's shows dwindled and he hit the cabaret circuit further afield, moving to Amsterdam in 1986, and traveling the world. In 1996, the first of his recognitions came in the form of the Rhythm and Blues Foundation Lifetime Achievement Award for the Flamingos contribution to music. In 1997, Hunt relocated to the UK and embarked on a revived northern soul scene.

In later years, having turned his hand to songwriting, Hunt penned his autobiography, Only Human, My Soulful Life, with author, Jan Warburton, which was released in December 2008.

Hunt started a new live show as Tommy Hunt & the New Flamingos, with members of the Spanish vocal group Velvet Candles. This show was presented on June 3, 2011, during the Screamin' Summer Festival in Barcelona, Spain. At the same time, Tommy also joined John Valero and The Black Beltones, and later The Twisted Wheels, that was his backing band in some shows around Spain.Tommy wrote all lyrics of their first álbum reléased in 2024.

Hunt died on February 12, 2025, at the age of 91.

== Awards ==
The award for the Flamingos from the Vocal Group Hall of Fame came in 2000, followed by the Doo-Wop Hall of Fame in 2001. The Flamingos were inducted into the Rock and Roll Hall of Fame for their thirty-year contribution to music.

== Discography ==
The Five Echoes with the Fats Coles Band

Sabre 102 - "Lonely Mood" / "Baby Come Back to Me" – 1953 (Black Vinyl)
Sabre 102 - "Lonely Mood" / "Baby Come Back to Me" – 1953 (Red Vinyl)

The Five Echoes

Sabre 107? - "Why Oh Why" / "That's My Baby" – 1954

The Flamingos

Decca 30335 - "The Ladder of Love" / "Let's Make Up" – 1957
Decca 30454 - "Helpless" / "My Faith in You" – 1957
Decca 30687 - "Where Mary Go" / "The Rock and Roll March" – 1958
End 1035 - "Lovers Never Say Goodbye" / "That Love Is You" – 1958
End 1040 - "But Not for Me" / "I Shed a Tear at Your Wedding" – 1959
End 1044 - "At the Prom" / "Love Walked In" – 1959
End 1045 - "I Only Have Eyes for You" / "At the Prom" – 1959
End 1046 - "I Only Have Eyes for You" / "Goodnight Sweetheart" – 1959
Decca 30880 - "Ever Since I Met Lucky" / "Kiss-a-Me" – 1959
End 1055 - "Love Walked In" / "Yours" – 1959
Decca 30948 - "Jerri-Lee" / "Hey Now!" – 1959
End 1062 - "I Was Such a Fool" / "Heavenly Angel" – 1959
End 1065 - "Mi Amore" / "You, Me and the Sea" – 1960
End 1068 - "Nobody Loves Me Like You" / "You, Me and the Sea" – 1960
End 1070 - "Besame Mucha" / "You, Me and the Sea" – 1960
End 1073 - "Mi Amore" / "At Night" – 1960
End 1079 - "When I Fall in Love" / "Beside You" – 1960
End 1085 - "That's Why I Love You" / "Ko Ko Mo" – 1960
End 1092 - "Time Was" / "Dream Girl" – 1960
End 1099 - "My Memories of You" / "I Want to Love You" – 1960

Tommy Hunt - U.S. singles

Scepter 1219 - "Human" / "Parade of Broken Hearts" – 1961
Scepter 1226 - "The Door Is Open" / "I'm Wondering" – 1962
Scepter 1231 - "So Lonely" / "The Work Song" – 1962
Scepter 1235 - "Didn't I Tell You She'll Hurt You" / "Poor Millionaire You're So Fine" – 1962
Scepter 1236 - "And I Never Knew" / "I Just Don't Know What to Do with Myself" – 1962
Scepter 1252 - "Do You Really Love Me" / "Son, My Son" – 1963
Scepter 1261 - "I Am a Witness"* / "I'm with You" – 1963 *written by Ed Townsend
Scepter 1275 - "It's All a Bad Dream" / "You Made a Man out of Me" – 1964
Atlantic 2278 - "I Don't Want to Lose You" / "Hold On" – 1965
Capitol 5621 - "I'll Make You Happy" / "The Clown" – 1966
Dynamo 101 - "The Biggest Man" / "Never Love a Robin" – 1967
Dynamo 105 - "Words Can Never Tell It" / "How Can I Be Anything" – 1967
Dynamo 110 - "Complete Man" / "Searchin' for My Love" – 1967
Dynamo 113 - "I Need a Woman of My Own" / "Searchin' for My Baby (Lookin' Everywhere)" – 1967
Dynamo 124 - "Born Free" / "Just a Little Taste (Of Your Sweet Lovin')" – 1968
Private Stock 45,115 - "Loving on the Losing Side" / "Sunshine Girl" – 1976
Collectables Col 030077 - "Oh No Not My Baby" / "Human"* – 1981 *Flip by Tommy Hunt
Town 103 - "The Work Song" / "Please Stay"* – 198? *Flip by The Ivory's

Tommy Hunt - UK singles

Top Rank Jar-605 - "The Door Is Open" / "I'm Wondering" – 1962
Polydor 236 - "Mind Body and Soul" / "One Mountain to Climb" – 1972
Spark 1132 - "Crackin' Up" / "Get Out" – 1975
Spark 1146 - "Loving on the Losing Side" / "Sunshine Girl" – 1976
Spark 1148 - "One Fine Morning" / "Sign on the Dotted Line" / "Loving You" – 1976

Albums

Scepter SRM 506 (mono) / Scepter SPS 506 (stereo) - I Just Don't Know What to Do with Myself – 1962
Tracks: I Just Don't Know What to Do with Myself / The Work Song / Parade of Broken Hearts / You're So Fine / She'll Hurt You So / And I Never Knew / Human / Didn't I Tell You / The Door Is Open / Poor Millionaire / So Lonely / I'm Wondering

Dynamo DM 7001 (mono) / Dynamo DS 8001 (stereo) - Tommy Hunt's Greatest Hits – 1967
Tracks: The Biggest Man / Comin' on Strong / Words Can Never Tell It / Never Love a Robin / How Can I Be Anything (Without You) / All in the Game / I Believe / Human / Born Free / Everybody's Got a Home (But Me)

Spark SRLP 117 - Live at Wigan Casino – 1976
Tracks: I Can't Turn You Loose / Get Ready / My Girl / Knock on Wood / Never Can Say Goodbye /// Help Me Make It Through the Night / Crackin' Up / Baby I Need Your Loving

Spark SRLP 120 - Sign Of The Times – 1976
Tracks: Loving on the Losing Side / Upon My Soul / Get Out / A Miracle Like You / You Got Me Where You Want Me / A Sign of the Times /// Sign on the Dotted Line / Loving You Is / Crackin' Up / Help Me Make It Thru' the Night / Sunshine Girl / Never Can Say Goodbye

Kent 059 - Your Man – 1986
Tracks: Love / She'll Hurt You Too / Didn't I Tell You / This and Only This / It's All a Bad Dream / I Am a Witness / Make the Night a Little Longer / Oh Lord What Are You Doing to Me /// Human / Your Man / Don't Make Me Over / The Parade of Broken Hearts / I Might Like It / You Made a Man out of Me / Just a Little Taste of Your Sweet Lovin' / Promised Land

== Bibliography ==
- Hunt, Tommy. Only Human, My Soulful Life, Bank House Books, ISBN 9781904408420
