= Charlene (Charlene album) =

Studio album by Charlene
- Released: 1976
- Studio: Motown/Hitsville U.S.A.
- Genre: Soul, R&B, pop
- Label: Prodigal
- Producer: Ron Miller (tracks 1, 3-6, 8 and 10; co-producer on tracks 2, 7 and 9), Berry Gordy (track 2), Don Costa (track 2), Clayton Ivey (track 3), Mike Lewis (track 3), Terry Woodford (track 3), Larry Duncan (track 7), Bob Gaudio (track 9)

Charlene chronology
Charlene (1976)	Songs of Love (1977)

Singles from Charlene
- 1. "It Ain't Easy Comin' Down" Released: 1977; 2. "I've Never Been to Me" Released: July 1977

Charlene is the debut album by Charlene. The two singles released from the album, "It Ain't Easy Comin' Down" and "I've Never Been to Me", both reached No. 97 on the US Billboard Hot 100 in 1977. The latter of these was re-released in 1982, reaching No. 3 in the US, and No. 1 in the UK.

== Track listing ==
Side one

1. "It Ain't Easy Comin' Down" (Ron Miller, Ken Hirsch) 3:38
2. "I've Never Been to Me" (Ron Miller, Ken Hirsch) 4:05
3. "Rings" (Eddie Reeves, Alex Harvey) 3:02
4. "Somewhere in My Life" (Ron Miller, Ken Hirsch) 4:30
5. "I Want to Come Back as a Song" (Ron Miller) 2:26

Side two

1. "Hey Mama" (Ron Miller, Ken Hirsch) 4:00
2. "I Love Every Little Thing About You" (Stevie Wonder) 3:00
3. "It's Really Nice to Be in Love Again" (Ron Miller, Ken Hirsch) 3:56
4. "Shake a Hand" (Carol Carmichael) 2:58
5. "On My Way to You" (Ron Miller, Ken Hirsch) 3:56
