= Skip-It =

Children's toy

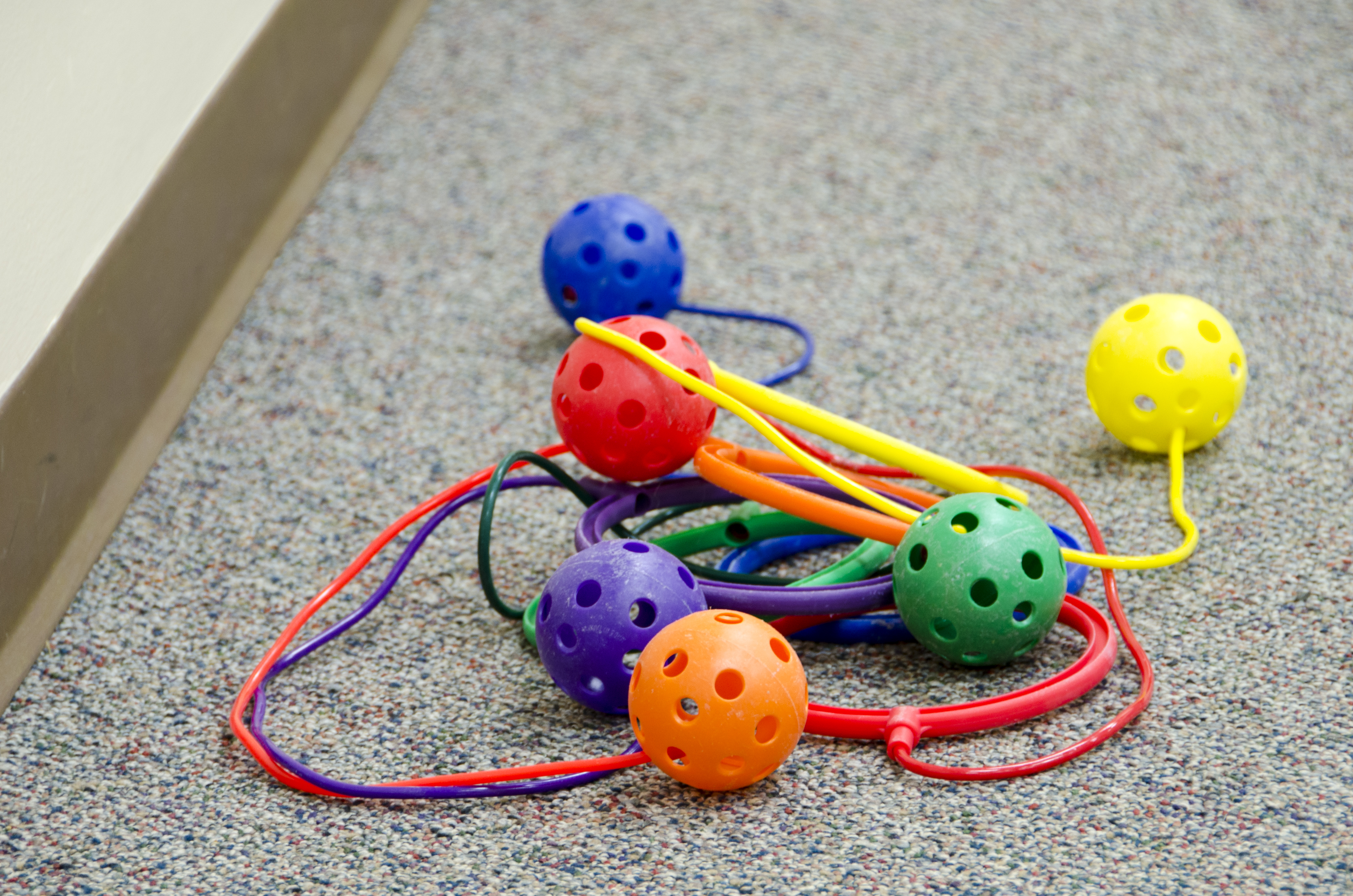
- Company: Tiger Electronics

Skip-It is a children's toy introduced in 1960s, the most popular variants of which were manufactured by Tiger Electronics in the 1980s and 1990s. The Skip-It apparatus was designed to be affixed to the child's ankle via a small plastic hoop and spun around in a 360 degree rotation while continuously skipped by the user.

Early toys similar to the Skip-It included the Jingle Jump, the trademark application for which was filed on December 30, 1963 by Jak-Pak Industries.

In the spring of 1968, Montreal-based plastic company Twinpak released a toy with similar function known as the Footsee, supposedly based on a game Twinpak co-founder Bob Asch saw an Arab child play in Jerusalem. The toy was a tremendous success in Canada, and Reliable Toy Company of Toronto released the Skipit (as the name was then spelled) that same year as a competitor. Twinpak sued Reliable for copying the design of their toy, and secured a temporary injunction prohibiting Reliable from manufacturing the Skipit, but by June 15, 1968 the two companies had reached a settlement allowing Reliable to continue manufacturing Skipits. Both toys were also distributed in the United States at this time. In 1975, the Chemtoy Corporation would release a similar toy called the Lemon Twist, which featured a lemon-shaped ball.

Tiger Electronics acquired the rights to the Skip-It in 1988 from its American rightsholder, the Paul E. Price Company. Tiger Electronics added a mechanical digital counter to the ball, which was patented by Avi Arad and Melvin R. Kennedy in 1990.

During the late 1980s and early 1990s, the Skip-It apparatus became a commercial success through its advertisements on daytime Nickelodeon broadcasting as well as other children's programming.

A version of the toy was featured in the Hong Kong martial art movie Butterfly and Sword (1993) where the character Miu Siu Siu / Ho Ching is seen playing with it.

In 2011, Time magazine included it in their 100 greatest toys ever.

In 2013, a spin-off of the board game Twister was developed, Twister Rave Skip-It.
