= I've Never Been to Me =

1977 single by Charlene

- Side A of the 1982 US reissue

Single by Charlene

from the album Charlene (1977) and I've Never Been to Me (1982)
- B-side: "It's Really Nice to Be in Love Again" (1977); "Somewhere in My Life" (1982)
- Released: July 1977
- Genre: Pop
- Length: 3:49 (1977); 3:47 (1982)
- Label: Prodigal (1977); Motown (1982)
- Songwriters: Ron Miller; Kenneth Hirsch
- Producers: Ron Miller; Don Costa; Berry Gordy

Charlene singles chronology
"Freddie" (1977)	"I've Never Been to Me" (1977)	"Are You Free" (1978)
"Hungry" (1980)	"I've Never Been to Me" (1982)	""Used to Be" (with Stevie Wonder)" (1982)

"I've Never Been to Me" is a ballad, written and composed by Ron Miller and Kenneth Hirsch and made popular via a recording by American singer Charlene. Although its original release in 1977 barely registered on the US Billboard Hot 100 chart, its re-release in 1982 reached No. 3 on the Hot 100 and earned Charlene a gold certification in Australia, where it held the No. 1 spot for six weeks. In addition, the song topped the charts in Canada, Ireland and the United Kingdom. It was also a top ten hit in Norway, Belgium, New Zealand and the Netherlands and became Motown's first top ten hit by a white female solo singer.

== Content ==
The song is addressed to a dissatisfied wife and mother who would like to trade her prosaic existence for the jet setting lifestyle the song's narrator has led. The narrator alludes to various hedonistic episodes in her life, concluding that while she's "been to paradise", she's ultimately failed to find self-fulfillment, expressing this with the line, "I've never been to me." There is also an alternative set of lyrics for the song in which the narrator is an elderly man, destined to die the next day, begging for a dime for a cup of coffee, addressing a younger man who is "raising hell" the way the old man used to do.

== Early versions ==
The earliest version of "I've Never Been to Me" to be released was by Randy Crawford, which appeared on her 1976 album Everything Must Change.

Charlene had recorded "I've Never Been to Me" in 1976 for her debut album, the self-titled Charlene, a Prodigal release (P610015S1), and the ballad contained a controversial spoken section. Songs of Love (P610018S1) came out six months later in 1977 and was essentially a re-issue of Charlene, having a slightly different track listing but retaining "I've Never Been to Me" without the spoken bridge.

However, "I've Never Been to Me" became Charlene's third consecutive single to reach the lower part of the Billboard Hot 100. From the Charlene LP, the first single, "It Ain't Easy Comin' Down", went to No. 97 in March 1977 (and No. 23 on AC). The following single, "Freddie" from the Songs of Love album, made it to No. 96 on the Hot 100 in May 1977 (and No. 40 on AC). The Hot 100 peak of "I've Never Been to Me" in its original formal release without the monologue was No. 97 (October 1977); and while Charlene's preceding two singles had both reached Billboard's Easy Listening chart, "I've Never Been to Me" failed to appear on that chart.

Besides Charlene's version, 1977 also saw the release of versions of the song by Nancy Wilson and Walter Jackson: Nancy Wilson's version served as the title track of her June 1977 album release and was the first version of the song to be released as a single, reaching No. 47 on the Billboard's R&B chart; while Walter Jackson's version – featuring the lyric formatted from a male perspective – was featured on his I Want to Come Back as a Song album released in the spring of 1977.

In February 1978, a mid-tempo recording of "I've Never Been to Me" by Mary MacGregor was released as the advance single from her ...In Your Eyes album, and this single reached number 29 on Billboard's Easy Listening and Canada's Adult Contemporary charts. A modified version of MacGregor's version was sent out to radio stations with the possibly controversial line in the final chorus, "I spent my life exploring the subtle whoring that costs too much to be free", amended to "I thought my heart would wait but I learned too late that it costs too much to be free". Also in 1978, Marti Caine recorded "I've Never Been to Me" for her album Behind the Smile from which it was issued as a single, and Mary Roos recorded the German rendering by lyricist Michael Holm entitled "Doch mich selber kenn ich nicht" ("But I do not know myself") for her album Maryland.

== Successful revival ==
In 1982, Scott Shannon, a disc jockey at Tampa radio station WRBQ-FM, began playing the "I've Never Been to Me" track off the Charlene album (with the original recitative), and response from local listeners was such as to motivate Shannon, a former Motown employee, to alert Motown president Jay Lasker to the track's hit potential. Lasker located Charlene, who, discouraged by the poor performance of her 1977 Motown releases and by the label's decision not to release a second album she had recorded, had left the music industry and met and married an Englishman, subsequently accompanying him to his native land and taking a job at a sweetshop in Ilford. Lasker personally telephoned her with the invitation to re-sign with Motown Records to facilitate the re-release of her "I've Never Been To Me" single, which occurred in February 1982.

The Billboard Hot 100 dated March 6, 1982, showed "I've Never Been to Me" by Charlene debuting at No. 84 – already 13 places higher than its 1977 peak. It subsequently rose as high as No. 3 on the Hot 100, where it held for three weeks during May and June, prevented from further chart movement by "Don't Talk to Strangers" by Rick Springfield and "Ebony and Ivory" by Paul McCartney and Stevie Wonder. The song ranked at No. 38 on the Billboard Year-End Hot 100 singles of 1982 list. The song was also a top ten hit on Billboard's Adult Contemporary chart (#7) and a minor C&W chart crossover (#60).

In 1982, "I've Never Been to Me" was one of the year's biggest hits and spent 20 weeks on the Hot 100 (23 including its original three-week run in 1977). The song also experienced international success, becoming popular in 26 countries around the globe. The track attained No. 1 status in Australia (six weeks), Canada (four weeks), Ireland (three weeks), and the United Kingdom (one week). "I've Never Been to Me" also afforded Charlene a top ten hit in Belgium, the Netherlands, New Zealand, and Norway.

When the song was revived in 1982, the version being played on radio was the take with the monologue (from the Prodigal LP Charlene, P6 10015S1) so this is the version Motown re-issued.

== Music video ==
A music video was made for the song's 1982 reissue. The video was filmed on location at Blickling Hall, Norfolk, England and features Charlene wearing her actual wedding dress from her marriage to Jeff Oliver, whom she had married at the time of the song's revival.

== Legacy ==
As Charlene was unable to successfully follow up the success of "I've Never Been to Me" – her only subsequent Hot 100 entry, "Used to Be" (a duet with Stevie Wonder), got as high as No. 46 – she remains a high-profile one-hit wonder.

On the 2002 VH1 special 100 Greatest One-Hit Wonders, "I've Never Been to Me" was ranked at No. 75; and in the program, it was stated that her entry "expresses the post-'70s hangover."

Over the years, memorable performances of and references to "I've Never Been to Me" have appeared on TV shows such as Will & Grace, Desperate Housewives, The Simpsons, This Is Us and The Flight Attendant and in films such as Shrek the Third in 2007 and You Were Never Really Here in 2017.

A popular choice for drag performers, "I've Never Been to Me" was spotlighted as the opening number to the 1994 movie The Adventures of Priscilla, Queen of the Desert. The scene depicted Hugo Weaving's Mitzi Del Bra lip-syncing in drag to Charlene's vocals. Charlene's original version of the sentimental ballad is also included on the soundtrack.

== Chart history ==
=== Weekly charts ===
Nancy Wilson

Chart (1977)	Peak position
US Billboard Hot Soul Singles	47
US Record World	135

Charlene

Chart (1977)	Peak position
US Billboard Hot 100	97

Mary MacGregor

Chart (1978)	Peak position
Canada RPM Adult Contemporary	29
US Billboard Adult Contemporary	29

Charlene

Chart (1982)	Peak position
Australia (Kent Music Report)	1
Belgium (Ultratop 50 Flanders)	7
Canada RPM Adult Contemporary	1
Canada RPM Top Singles	1
Denmark (Hitlisten)	7
Ireland (IRMA)	1
Netherlands (Single Top 100)	7
New Zealand (Recorded Music NZ)	5
Norway (VG-lista)	5
UK Singles (Official Charts)	1
US Billboard Hot 100	3
US Adult Contemporary (Billboard)	7
US Hot Country Songs (Billboard)	60
US Cash Box Top 100	3

=== Year-end charts ===
Chart (1982)	Rank
Australia (Kent Music Report)	11
Canada	6
Netherlands	56
New Zealand	40
UK	20
US Billboard Hot 100	38
US Cash Box	29

== Certifications and sales ==
Region	Certification	Certified units/sales
Australia (ARIA)	Gold	50,000^{^}
^{^} Shipments figures based on certification alone.

== Covers and international versions ==
A Spanish-language recording of "I've Never Been to Me" entitled "Nunca he ido a mi" was recorded by Charlene and was one of two B-side tracks featured on the re-release of "It Ain't Easy Comin' Down" – the follow-up to the 1982 release of "I've Never Been to Me" – in its UK format (in other territories, "It Ain't Easy Comin' Down" featured only the one B-side, "If I Could See Myself").

Charlene re-released the song in the form of a dance remix via download music in 2008.

Versions with the male lyrics also have been recorded by The Temptations and Howard Keel on his album Yesterday, Today and Tomorrow. Keel made this song a staple of his live concerts from 1985 to 2002.

Other notable covers include renditions by Patricia Paay, Ned's Atomic Dustbin, S.H.E and Seiko Niizuma.

Many international versions have also been recorded, including by Karel Gott in Czech (1983); Garry Hagger in Dutch (1996); Seija Simola in Finnish (1984); Paola del Medico (1982), Mary Roos (1978), Michael von der Heide (2000) and Ina Müller (2009) in German; and Kikki Danielsson in Swedish (1983).

The song is popular in Asia. Vivian Chow did a version in Cantonese, Teresa Teng in Mandarin, Vân Quỳnh in Vietnamese, As One in Korean and Megumi Shiina in Japanese.

Tracy Huang has covered the song, her version notably changing some of the lyrics: "where I sipped champagne" becomes "where they sip champagne"; "undressed by kings" becomes "caressed by kings"; and "subtle whoring" becomes "inner feelings".

Ogie Alcasid has also covered the song with some lyric changes, in his case sung from a third-person point of view. His wife Regine Velasquez also performed "I've Never Been to Me" in her 2002 One Night with Regine benefit concert.

Irish novelty act Dustin the Turkey parodied the song as "Never Been to Meath".

== Worst song lists ==
- The song was listed as the No. 3 worst song of all time in Jimmy Guterman's 1991 book "The Worst Rock n' Roll Records of All Time: A Fan's Guide to the Stuff You Love to Hate."
- A 2006 CNN poll listed the song as the No. 4 worst song of all time.
