= Twisted Wheel Club =

Nightclub in Manchester, England

Coordinates: 53.47734°N 2.23279°W

Twisted Wheel
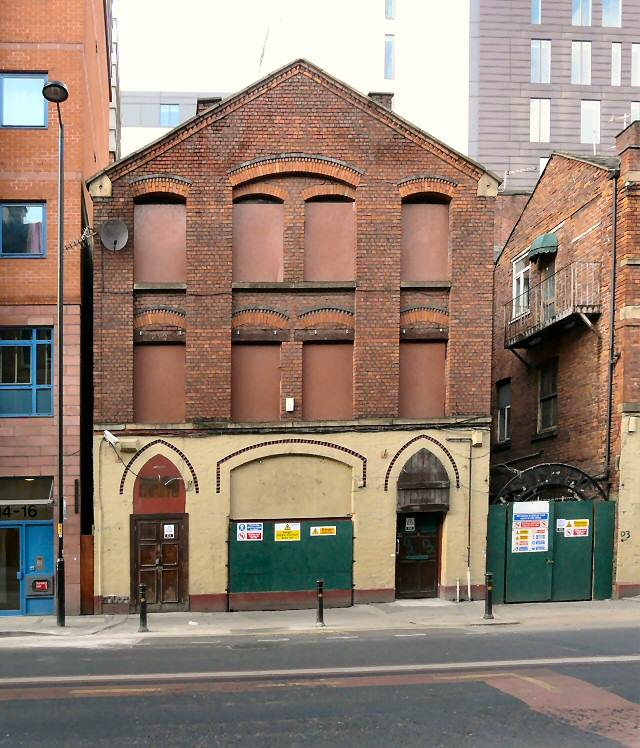
- The former club building, pictured in 2013
- Interactive map of Twisted Wheel
- Location: Brazennose Street, Manchester, Whitworth Street, Manchester,
- Owner: Jack, Phillip and Ivor Abadi
- Seating type: Standing
- Type: Live music venue
- Events: Blues, soul, Northern soul

Construction
- Opened: 1963
- Closed: 1971

The Twisted Wheel was a nightclub in Manchester, England, open from 1963 to 1971. It was one of the first clubs to play the music that became known as Northern soul.

== History ==
The nightclub was founded by the brothers Jack, Phillip and Ivor Abadi as a blues and soul live music coffee bar/dance club. The original location of the club was on Brazennose Street, between Deansgate and Albert Square. This was the rhythm and blues mod venue, with Roger Eagle as DJ. The last all-nighter at the Brazennose St. venue was 11 September 1965 with John Mayall's Bluesbreakers (featuring Eric Clapton) headlining. The club, along with Roger Eagle as DJ, then re-located to 6 Whitworth Street opening on Saturday 18 September with The Spencer Davis Group (featuring Steve Winwood) as headliners. This venue was the mostly soul-oriented club with resident Saturday "All Niter" DJ Bob Dee compiling and supervising the playlist and utilising the newly developed slip-cueing technique to cue in vinyl records. The Whitworth Street venue was a converted warehouse, with a coffee snack bar on the ground floor and a series of rooms in the cellar. These lower rooms housed the stage, a caged disc jockey area, and the main dance room. Back-lit iron wheels decorated the simple painted brick walls. Ivor Abadi ran the club without an alcohol licence, serving only soft drinks and snacks. There was another Twisted Wheel in Blackpool under the same ownership.

Prior to the opening of the Twisted Wheel, most UK nightclubs played modern popular music, Soul and R&B. The Twisted Wheel DJs and local entrepreneurs imported large quantities of records directly from the United States. Many of the records played at the Twisted Wheel were rare even in the US; some may only have been released in one city or state. At the time, in addition to records released by larger record companies, there was a huge number of soul releases by a wide variety of artists on a multiplicity of obscure, independent labels.

All-night sessions were held each Saturday, from 11:00 pm through to Sunday 7:30 am. DJs played new records generally not played elsewhere. However, by 1969 more mainstream songs like Steam's "Na Na Hey Hey Kiss Him Goodbye" and Tony Joe White's "Polk Salad Annie" were added to the early session playlist. Allnight DJ, Brian "45" Philips introduced - Jerry Cook - "I Hurt on the Other Side"; Dobie Gray - "Out on the Floor"; The Artistics - "This Heart of Mine"; Leon Haywood - "Baby Reconsider", Earl Van Dyke - "6 by 6" and U.S releases on Ric-Tic, Brunswick, Okeh and other obscure labels.

Each week at 2:00 am Soul artists performed live at the club. Junior Walker, Edwin Starr, Oscar Toney Jr., Marv Johnson, Mary Wells, Ike and Tina Turner, Johnny Johnson and the Bandwagon, and Inez and Charlie Foxx were among the many musicians to squeeze onto the tiny stage. Soul fans travelled from all over the United Kingdom for the all-nighters; some by car, most by train, coach or bus. Singer Chris Rea on his album Deltics commemorates the club in the song "Twisted Wheel". Rea is said to have written this song because of his chagrin at being too young to go on the organised trips to the club's weekend all-nighters from his hometown of Middlesbrough in the mid-1960s.

The club gained the reputation of playing rare and uptempo soul. Following a visit to the Twisted Wheel in 1970, music journalist Dave Godin noted that the music played at the club, and in northern England in general, was quite different from the music played in London. His description "Northern soul" became the accepted term for this genre and subculture.

The club shut down in early 1971 because of a bylaw which prevented premises from staying open more than two hours into the following day. The closure of The Twisted Wheel gave the Golden Torch its opportunity to take the Northern soul crown for the next few years, until it too was shut down due to local council opposition. Today its legacy is eclipsed by that of the nearby Wigan Casino.

== Later versions ==
The Twisted Wheel was reopened in the 1970s as a fully licensed and expanded venue by Pete Roberts. It enjoyed capacity attendance for its Sunday afternoon sessions, alongside which were all-nighters and Friday evening sessions. From 2002, nostalgia soul nights were held in the original Whitworth Street location on the final Friday of every month. These nights featured the original DJ playlists and many original members attended. Two "Goldmine" recordings, Twisted Wheel and Twisted Wheel Again, feature songs from the original DJ playlists.

The physical structure of the club was removed from the Manchester landscape in 2013 when it was demolished to make way for a hotel. This happened despite attempts to save the building on the grounds of the venue's cultural importance.

The Twisted Wheel relocated to Night People, 105-107 Princess Street, Manchester. The club had two rooms with separate sound systems, one of which was solely dedicated to the legacy of the iconic Twisted Wheel, complete with original memorabilia and bare brick arches throughout, giving it the atmosphere that Whitworth St was known for.

On 10 April 2022, the Twisted Wheel Club moved to the newly revamped Band on the Wall venue in Manchester's Northern Quarter. The Sunday afternoon / early evening sessions are held monthly. By October 2023, the Twisted Wheel Club / Basement 66 operates out of AREA on Manchester's Sackville Street.
