= Tobi Lark =

American singer

- Also known as: Bessie Watson; Tobi Legend
- Born: Bessie Grace Gupton; 1941 (age 84–85)
- Origin: Alabama, US
- Genres: Gospel, soul
- Occupation: Singer
- Years active: 1960–present
- Labels: Riverside, Jay Pee, Mala, Cotillion, others

Tobi Lark (born Bessie Grace Gupton; 1941) is an American-born Canadian soul and gospel singer, who also recorded under the names Bessie Watson and Tobi Legend. She had a top 40 hit in 1970 in Canada with "We're All in This Together". Elsewhere her best known record is "Time Will Pass You By", regarded as a classic of Northern soul, which she recorded in 1968 believing it was just a demo; it was released under the name of Tobi Legend without her approval.

== Life and career ==
She was born Bessie Grace Gupton in Alabama, the daughter of gospel singer Emma Washington. She grew up in Detroit and first performed in her mother's choir, the Emma Washington Gospel Singers. She toured with the group for ten years, from the age of nine, before securing her first professional job, as a backing singer for B. B. King. As Bessie Watson, she first recorded in 1963, releasing the single "'Deed I Do" backed by the Cannonball Adderley Quintet, on the Riverside label, and then two singles, "I'm in Your Corner" and "Wake Up Crying" on the Jay Pee label. As Tobi Lark, she then recorded several singles for the Palmer, Topper, and U.S.D. labels, but none achieved much commercial success. She also performed with the Impressions, the Four Tops, Ben E. King, Wilson Pickett, King Curtis, and Duke Ellington, among others.

In the mid 1960s, she separated from her husband and moved to Montreal, Quebec, Canada, with her young son. She performed in clubs and at Expo 67, before moving to Toronto to work for Ronnie Hawkins. She was then recruited to play a lead role in the musical Hair in Toronto, and later set up the Armageddon Revue at the Blue Orchid club there. In 1968, in Detroit, she recorded "Time Will Pass You By", a song written by English-born songwriter and record producer John Rhys Eddins with Nick Zesses and Dino Fekaris. The record was released on the Mala label under the name "Tobi Legend", but it was unsuccessful until it was picked up in the early 1970s by followers of the Northern soul scene in the UK. The song became known as one of the "Three Before Eight", played at the conclusion of every all-nighter at the Wigan Casino club, and has since featured on several anthologies of Northern soul music including The Best Northern Soul All-Nighter ... Ever!, The Northern Soul Story, and The Wigan Casino Story.

Newspaper columnist Laura Barton, of The Guardian, has compared the record to a Shakespeare sonnet:

"It...is simply a song about seeing the preciousness of life, about trying to live our lives better and brighter. Its verses cut a melancholy figure, its opening lines reflecting on the steady turn of the world: "Passing seasons ever fade away/ Into misty clouds of autumn grey/ As I sit here looking at the street/ Little figures, quickly moving feet." And then in zaps the chorus, a remonstration of sorts, or a call to arms: "Life is just a precious minute baby," it yells. "Open up your eyes and see it baby/ Give yourself a better chance/ Because time will pass you/ Right on by." Like many pop songs, there's something of the sonnet about Time Will Pass You By; it's there in the song's intention of course, but there is something about Legend's track that has always reminded me specifically of Shakespeare's Sonnet 60. Legend's second verse, "I'm just a pebble on the beach and I sit and wonder why/ Little people running around/ Never knowing why," for example, seems to echo Shakespeare's lines: "Like as the waves make towards the pebbled shore/ So do our minutes hasten to their end;/ Each changing place with that which goes before,/ In sequent toil all forwards do contend.""

Returning to the name Tobi (or Toby) Lark, she released three further singles on Cotillion Records, "Shake A Hand" (1969), "Just To Hold My Hand" (1970), and "We're All in This Together" (1970). The last of these was recorded live with a large choir at St. Paul's Roman Catholic Church in Toronto, and peaked at No. 38 on Canada's national RPM singles chart in November 1970. She continued to work in Toronto, Windsor and Detroit, with the Toronto Symphony Orchestra and singers including Kenny Rogers. In 1995, she recorded a live CD, and appeared at the Toronto Blues Society's Women's Blues Revue.
