= Northern soul =

Music and dance movement that emerged in Northern England in the late 1960s

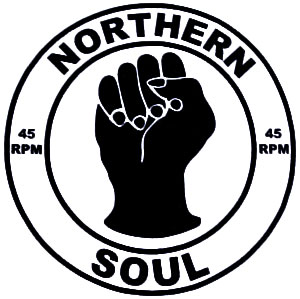
The clenched fist logo came to represent the Northern soul movement in the 1970s.

Northern soul is a music and dance movement that emerged in Northern England and the Midlands in the early 1970s. It developed from the British mod scene, based on a particular style of Black American soul music with a heavy beat and fast tempo (100 bpm and above).

The Northern soul movement generally eschews Motown or Motown-influenced music that has had significant mainstream commercial success. The recordings most prized by enthusiasts are by lesser-known artists, "rare grooves" released in limited numbers on labels such as VeeJay, Chess, Brunswick, Ric-Tic, Gordy Records, Golden World Records (Detroit), Mirwood Records (Los Angeles), Shout Records and Okeh.

Northern soul is associated with dance styles and fashions that grew out of the underground rhythm and soul scene of the late 1960s at venues such as the Twisted Wheel in Manchester. This scene and the associated dances and fashions quickly spread to other dancehalls and nightclubs like the Wigan Casino, Blackpool Mecca (the Highland Room), and Golden Torch (Stoke-on-Trent).

As the favoured beat became more uptempo and frantic in the early 1970s, Northern soul dancing became more athletic, resembling the later dance styles of disco and break dancing. Featuring spins, flips, karate kicks and backdrops, club dancing styles were often inspired by the stage performances of touring American soul acts such as Little Anthony and the Imperials and Jackie Wilson.

In the late 1960s and early 1970s, popular Northern soul records generally dated from the mid-1960s. This meant that the movement was sustained (and new recordings added to playlists) by prominent DJs discovering rare and previously overlooked records. Later on, certain clubs and DJs began to move away from the 1960s sound and began to play newer releases with a more contemporary sound.

== History ==
=== 1960s ===
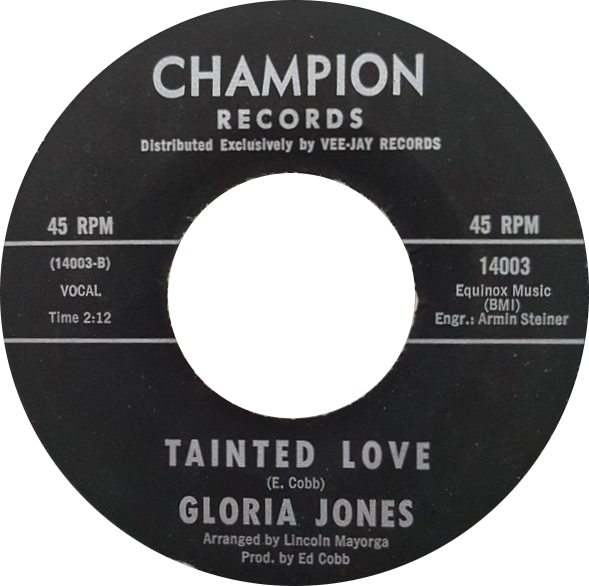
The original release of Gloria Jones' "Tainted Love"

The term "Northern soul" emanated from the record shop Soul City in Covent Garden, London, which was run by the soul music collector Dave Godin. It was first publicly used in Godin's weekly column in Blues & Soul magazine in June 1970. In a 2002 interview with Chris Hunt of Mojo magazine, Godin said he had first come up with the term in 1968, to help employees at Soul City differentiate the more modern funkier sounds from the smoother. Godin referred to the latter's requests as "Northern soul":

I had started to notice that northern football fans who were in London to follow their team were coming into the store to buy records, but they weren't interested in the latest developments in the black American chart. I devised the name as a shorthand sales term. It was just to say "if you've got customers from the north, don't waste time playing them records currently in the U.S. black chart, just play them what they like – 'Northern Soul'".

The music style most associated with Northern soul is the heavy syncopated beat and fast tempo of the mid-1960s Motown Records, usually combined with soulful vocals. These types of records, which suited the athletic dancing that was prevalent, became known on the scene as "stompers". Notable examples include Tony Clarke's "Landslide" (popularised by Ian Levine at Blackpool Mecca) and Gloria Jones' "Tainted Love" (purchased by Richard Searling on a trip to the United States in 1973 and popularised at Va Va's in Bolton, and later, Wigan Casino). According to Northern soul DJ Ady Croadsell, viewed retrospectively, the earliest recording to possess this style was the 1965 single "I Can't Help Myself (Sugar Pie Honey Bunch)" by the Four Tops, although that record was never popular in the Northern soul scene because it was too mainstream. The venue most commonly associated with the early development of the Northern soul scene was the Twisted Wheel in Manchester. The club began in the early 1950s as a beatnik coffee bar called The Left Wing, but in early 1963, the run-down premises were leased by two Manchester businessmen (Ivor and Phil Abadi) and turned into a music venue. Initially, the Twisted Wheel mainly hosted live music on the weekends and Disc Only nights during the week. DJ Roger Eagle, a collector of imported American soul, jazz and rhythm and blues, was booked around this time, and the club's reputation as a place to hear and dance to the latest American R&B music began to grow. Pubs such as the Eagle in Birmingham were frequented by young blue-eyed soul singers such as Steve Winwood, who released songs similar to the early U.S. soul music.

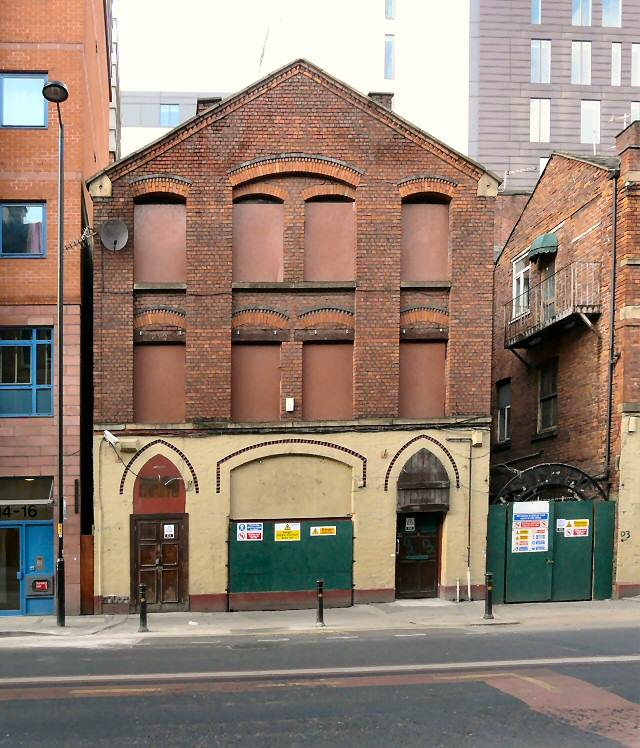
The site of the Twisted Wheel, in 2013

By 1968 the reputation of the Twisted Wheel and the type of music being played there had grown nationwide, and soul fans were travelling from all over the United Kingdom to attend the Saturday all-nighters. Until his departure in 1968, resident 'All Niter' DJ Bob Dee compiled and supervised the playlist, utilising the newly developed slip-cueing technique to spin the vinyl. Rarer, more up-tempo imported records were added to the playlist in 1969 by the new younger DJs like Brian "45" Phillips up until the club's eventual closure in 1971. After attending one of the venue's all-nighters in November 1970, Godin wrote: "it is without doubt the highest and finest I have seen outside of the USA ... never thought I'd live to see the day where people could so relate the rhythmic content of Soul music to bodily movement to such a skilled degree!" The venue's owners had successfully filled the vacancy left by Eagle with a growing roster of specialist soul DJs including Brian Rae, Paul Davies and Alan 'Ollie' Ollerton.

The Sapphires, especially their songs "Slow Fizz", "Gotta Have Your Love" (which reached No. 33 on the Billboard R&B chart), "Evil One", and "Gonna Be a Big Thing", became popular in the Northern soul scene, including during the early days at the Twisted Wheel Club.

=== 1970s ===
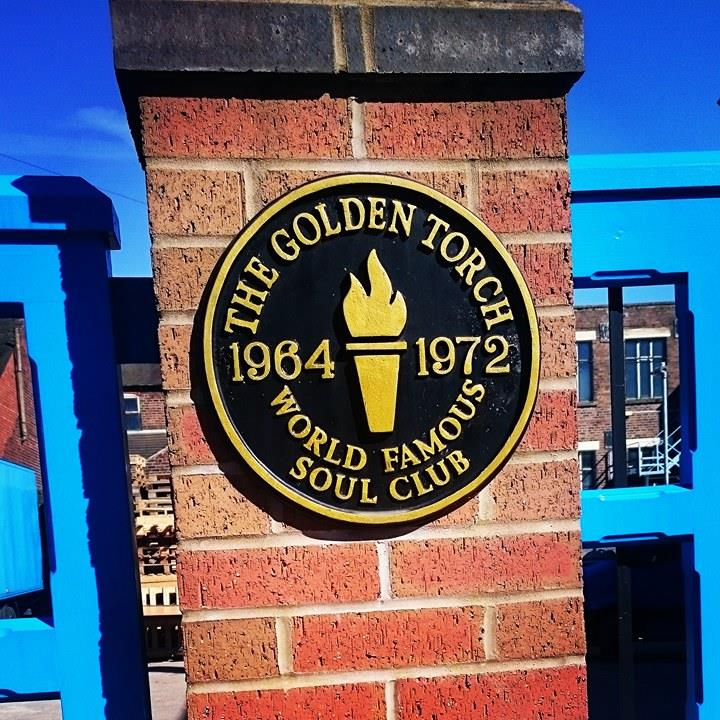
Commemorative plaque on the site of The Golden Torch

In America, Holland-Dozier-Holland's successful acts on Invictus Records were Freda Payne and Chairmen of the Board. They also released Parliament's first album, Osmium. The label was distributed by Capitol Records from 1969 to 1972 and then by Columbia Records from 1973 onwards.

In September 1970, the British music magazine NME reported that Invictus had the UK's top two singles. Freda Payne's "Band of Gold" was No. 1, while Chairmen of the Board's "Give Me Just a Little More Time" was No. 3 on the UK Singles Chart. Both records were million-sellers in the US, but neither topped the pop or R&B charts. Invictus had two other gold records: Freda Payne's "Bring the Boys Home" and 8th Day's "She's Not Just Another Woman", both in 1971. Northern soul reached the peak of its popularity in the mid- to late-1970s. At this time, there were soul clubs in virtually every major town in the Midlands and the North of England. Some nightclubs regarded as the most important in this decade were the Golden Torch, and Wigan Casino (1973 to 1981).

Although Wigan Casino is now the most well-known, the best-attended Northern soul all-night venue at the beginning of the decade was actually the Golden Torch, where regular Friday night soul "all-nighters" began during the latter months of 1970. Chris Burton, the owner, stated that by 1972, the club had a membership of 12,500 and had hosted 62,000 separate customer visits.

In 1972, white soul group the Four Seasons released the song "The Night" from their May 1972 album Chameleon, a disco song which appealed to the Northern soul scene, and as a result, it was successfully re-released in the UK in the spring of 1975.

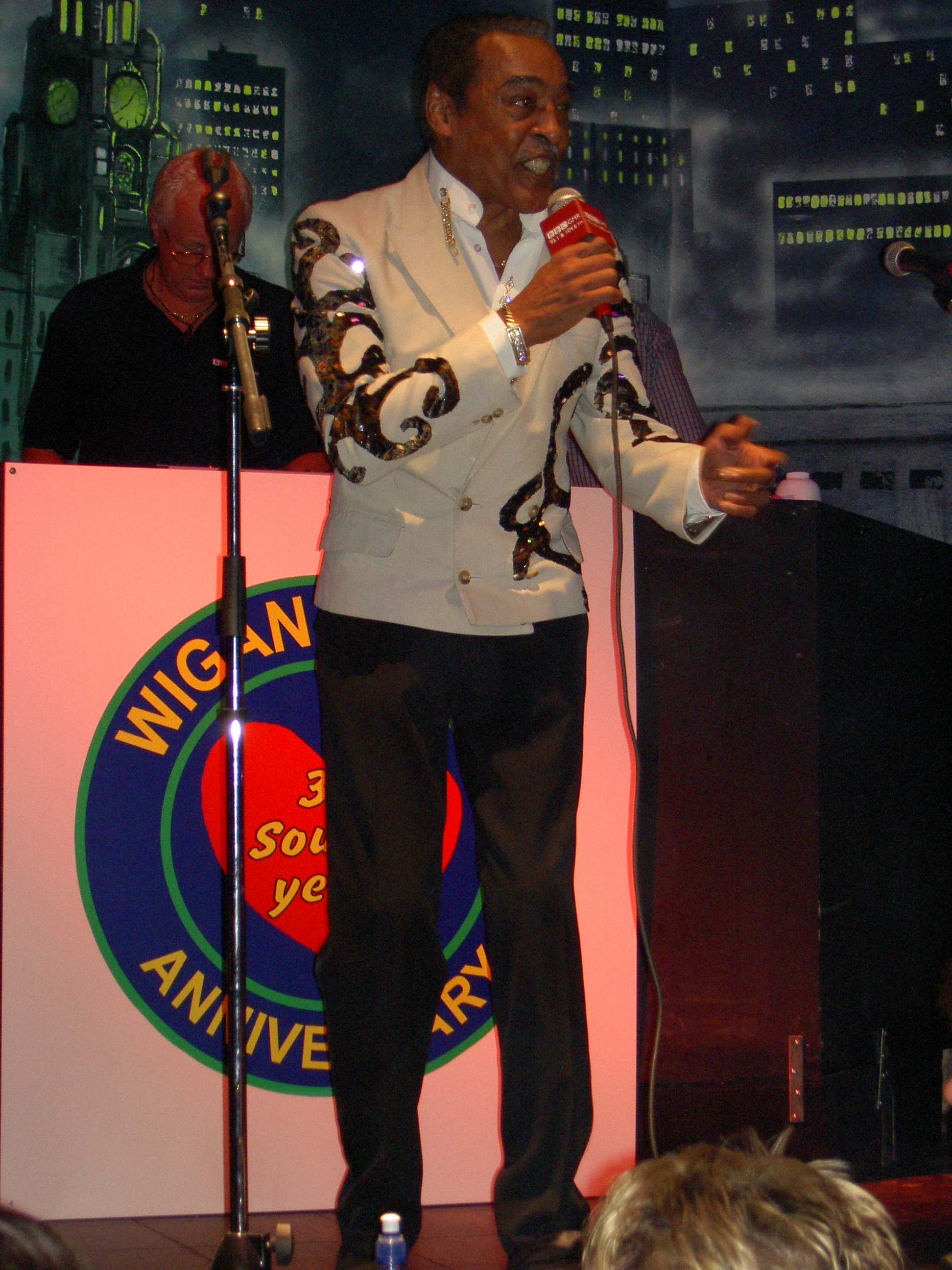
Tommy Hunt appearing at a Wigan Casino reunion event in 2002

Wigan Casino began its weekly soul all-nighters in September 1973. Wigan Casino had a much larger capacity than many competing venues and ran its events from 2 am until 8 am. There was a regular roster of DJs, including Russ Winstanley, Kev Roberts and Richard Searling. By 1976, the club had a membership of 100,000 people, and in 1978, it was voted the world's number-one discotheque by Billboard. This was during the heyday of the Studio 54 nightclub in New York City. By the late 1970s, the club had its own spin-off record label, Casino Classics.

By this time, Wigan Casino was coming under criticism from many soul fans about selling out the format and playing anything that came along. The contemporary black American soul was changing with the advent of funk, disco and jazz-funk, and the supply of recordings with the fast-paced Northern soul sound began to dwindle rapidly. As a result, Wigan Casino DJs resorted to playing any kind of record that matched the correct tempo. Also, the club was subjected to intense media coverage and began to attract many otherwise uninterested people of whom the soul purists did not approve.

The Northern soul movement between Wigan Casino's fans and Blackpool Mecca's wider approach accepted the more contemporary sounds of Philly soul, early disco and funk. Ian Levine broke from the Northern soul mould by playing a new release by the Carstairs ("It Really Hurts Me Girl") in the early 1970s:

Back in England I found this dealer called John Anderson who'd moved from Scotland to King's Lynn. I told him I wanted this Carstairs record and he'd just had a shipment in from America of 100,000 demo records from radio stations. We went through this collection, me, Andy Hanley, and Bernie Golding, and we found three copies of the Carstairs record. Went back to Blackpool, played the record and changed the whole scene. Blackpool Mecca suddenly became the home of this new Northern soul sound. I would've heard this record in 1973, when it was supposedly released, but not obtained it until 1974.

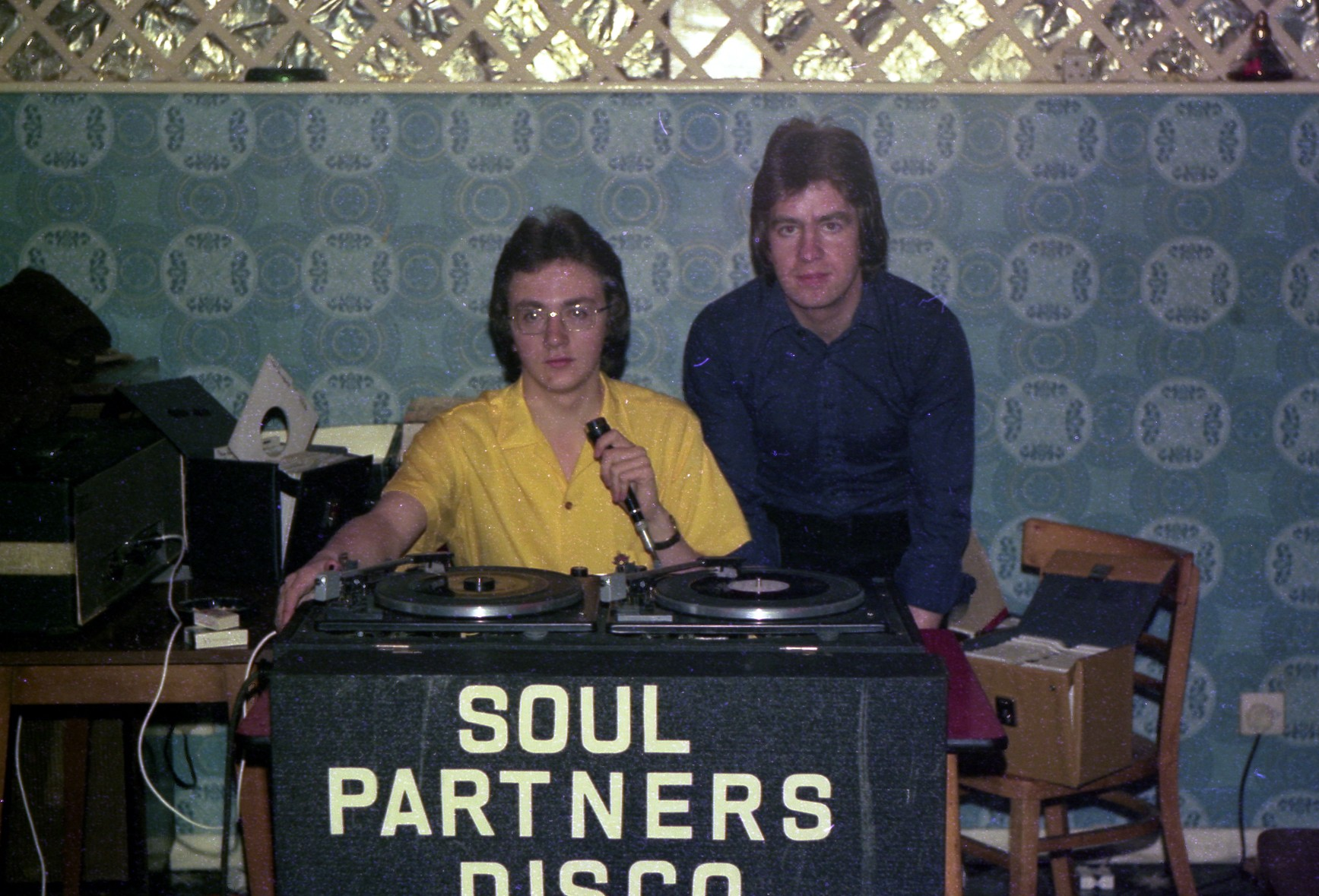
Northern soul DJs "Soul Partners" performing in Leigh in 1974

Other major Northern soul venues in the 1970s include the Catacombs in Wolverhampton, Va Va's in Bolton, the Talk of the North all-nighters at the Pier and Winter Gardens in Cleethorpes, Tiffany's in Coalville, Samantha's in Sheffield, Neil Rushton's Heart of England soul club all-dayers at the Ritz in Manchester and the Nottingham Palais. As the 1970s progressed, the Northern soul scene expanded even further nationally. There was a notable scene in the east of England: Shades Northampton was one of the leading venues in this area of the country during the early 1970s until it closed in 1975. Later came the all-nighters at the St Ivo Centre in St Ives, the Phoenix Soul club at the Wirrina Stadium in Peterborough and the Howard Mallett in Cambridge. Other towns with notable Northern soul venues at this time included Kettering, Coventry, Bournemouth, Southampton and Bristol.

=== 1980s and later ===
When Wigan Casino closed in 1981, many believed the Northern soul scene was on the verge of disintegrating. However, the late 1970s mod revival, the thriving scooterboy subculture, and the late 1980s acid jazz movement were popular among music fans. The popularity of the music was introduced by a wave of reissues and compilation albums from minor independent record labels. The rare groove boom started in the late 1980s with underground DJ Barrie Sharpe and Lascelles Gordon. Both played that brand of obscure American import records, singles and albums ("looking back retrospectively"), that they had in their collection. These were bought from specialist import record shops such as Moondogs in East Ham and Contempo record shop at 42 Hanway Street in the West end of London, owned by John Abbey, founder of Blues & Soul magazine. The magazine also had its own record label (also called Contempo), releasing music from the 1970s, which, starting in 1984, played at a club previously known as Whisky-A-Go-Go, founded by Rene Gelston in Wardour Street.

Norman Jay's show was a collaboration with DJ Judge Jules, featuring a mainly urban soundtrack from the 1970s and 1980s mixed with early house music. Tracks similar to "rare grooves" had begun to see a following in the 1970s Northern soul movement, which curated a collection of rare and obscure soul. Many of these labels were set up by DJs and collectors who had been part of the original Northern soul scene. The 1980s – often dismissed as a low period for Northern soul by those who had left the scene in the 1970s — featured almost 100 new venues in places such as Bradford, London, Peterborough, Leighton Buzzard, Whitchurch, Coventry and Leicester. Pre-eminent among the 1980s venues were Stafford's Top of the World and London's 100 Club.

Today there are regular Northern soul events in various parts of the United Kingdom, such as the Nightshift Club all-nighters at the Bisley Pavilion in Surrey and the Prestatyn Weekender in North Wales. In an August 2008 article in The Times, broadcaster Terry Christian argued that Northern soul was undergoing a distinct revival in the late 2000s. Christian cited the popularity of regular revivals of Twisted Wheel soul all-nighters at the original venue (in Whitworth Street, Manchester) plus the Beat Boutique Northern soul all-nighters at the Ruby Lounge and MMUnion in Manchester. Many who ceased their involvement in the late 1970s have now returned to the scene and regularly participate in such events. In 2009, Paul O'Grady included a Northern Soul Triple in his weekly BBC Radio 2 show. He played three Northern soul hits, often at the request of his listeners.

The Northern soul movement inspired the film Soulboy (2010), directed by Shimmy Marcus, and at least one novel: Do I Love You? (2008) by Paul McDonald. In June 2010, theatre director Fiona Laird wrote and directed Keeping the Faith, a musical based on the Wigan Casino scene and featuring Northern soul music. It was staged at the Central School of Speech and Drama's Webber Douglas Studio, with a revival at the same venue in September 2010.

According to Will Hermes of Rolling Stone, the 2008 Raphael Saadiq album The Way I See It is an original evocation of "classic Northern soul". The music of Yorkshire singer John Newman has also been described as 'Northern soul', including his No. 1 hit "Love Me Again". One version of the video for the song features stereotypical Northern soul dancing; additionally, the track samples the famous soul drum break from James Brown's "Funky Drummer", performed by Clyde Stubblefield.

== Northern soul music ==
In the book Last Night a DJ Saved My Life: the History of the DJ, the authors describe Northern soul as "built from failures", stating: "... Northern soul was the music made by hundreds of singers and bands who were copying the Detroit sound of Motown pop. Most of the records were complete failures in their own time and place... but in Northern England from the end of the 1960s through to its heyday in the middle 1970s, were exhumed and exalted."

=== Music style ===
Other related music styles also gained acceptance in the Northern soul scene. Slower, less-danceable soul records were often played, such as Barbara Mills' "Queen of Fools" (popular in 1972 at the Golden Torch) and the Mob's "I Dig Everything About You". Every all-nighter at Wigan Casino ended with the playing of three well-known Northern soul songs with a particular going home theme. These came to be known as the "3 before 8" and were: "Time Will Pass You By" by Tobi Legend, "Long After Tonight is Over" by Jimmy Radcliffe and "I'm on My Way" by Dean Parrish. Commercial pop songs that matched the up-tempo beat of the stompers were also played at some venues, including the Ron Grainer Orchestra's instrumental "Theme From Joe 90" at Wigan Casino and the Just Brothers' surf-guitar song, "Sliced Tomatoes" at Blackpool Mecca.

As the scene developed in the mid and late 1970s, the more contemporary and rhythmically sophisticated sounds of disco and Philly soul became accepted at certain venues following its adoption at Blackpool Mecca. This style is typified musically by the O'Jays' "I Love Music" (UK No. 13, January 1976), which gained popularity before its commercial release at Blackpool Mecca in late 1975. The record that initially popularised this change is usually cited as the Carstairs "It Really Hurts Me Girl" (Red Coach), a record initially released late in 1973 on promotional copies but quickly withdrawn due to lack of interest from American radio stations. The hostility towards any contemporary music style from Northern soul traditionalists at Wigan Casino led to the creation of the spin-off modern soul movement in the early 1980s.

=== Rarity of Northern soul records ===
Some Northern soul records were so rare that only a handful of copies were known to exist, so specific DJs and clubs became associated with particular records that were almost exclusively in their own playlists. Keith Rylatt and Phil Scott wrote:

As venues such as the Twisted Wheel evolved into northern soul clubs in the late 1960s and the dancers increasingly demanded newly discovered sounds, DJs began to acquire and play rare and often deleted US releases that had not gained even a release in the UK.

These records were sometimes obtained through specialist importers or, in some cases, by DJs visiting the US and purchasing old warehouse stock. Many of the original singers and musicians remained unaware of their newfound popularity for many years.

As the scene increased in popularity, a network of UK record dealers emerged who could acquire further copies of the original vinyl and supply them to fans at prices commensurate with their rarity and desirability. Later on, several UK record labels capitalised on the booming popularity of northern soul and negotiated licences for certain popular records from the copyright holders and reissue them as new 45s or compilation LPs. Among these labels were Casino Classics, PYE Disco Demand, Inferno, Kent Modern and Goldmine.

The notoriety of DJs on the Northern soul scene was enhanced by the possession of rare records, but exclusivity was not enough on its own. The records had to conform to a certain musical style and gain acceptance on the dance floor. Northern soul collectors seek rare singles by artists such as Holly Maxwell, Gene Chandler, Barbara Acklin, the Casualeers, and Jimmy Burns. Frank Wilson's "Do I Love You (Indeed I Do)" has been rated the rarest and most valuable Northern soul single. In December 2014, collectors were bidding over £11,000 for a copy of the London Records version of Darrell Banks' "Open the Door to Your Heart", thought to be the only copy in circulation. It had previously been thought that all the original versions had been destroyed when rival label EMI won the rights to release the single.

=== Hits and favourites ===
The Northern soul movement spawned an active market in reissuing older soul recordings in the UK, several of which became popular enough to make the UK charts several years after their original issue. Dave Godin is generally credited with being the first UK entrepreneur to start this trend, setting up the Soul City label in 1968, and striking a deal with EMI to license Gene Chandler's 1965 recording "Nothing Can Stop Me", which had been popular for several years at the Twisted Wheel. Issued as a 45 on Soul City, the track peaked at UK No. 41 in August 1968, becoming the first Northern soul-derived chart hit. A few months later, in January 1969, Jamo Thomas' 1966 single "I Spy (For the FBI)" was similarly licensed and reissued, hitting UK No. 44.

The trend continued into the 1970s, as songs from the 1960s that were revived on the Northern soul scene were reissued by their original labels and became UK top 40 hits. These include the Tams' 1964 recording "Hey Girl Don't Bother Me" (UK No. 1, July 1971) – which was popularised by Midlands DJ Carl Dene – the Fascinations' 1966 single "Girls Are Out to Get You" (UK No. 32, 1971), the Elgins' "Heaven Must Have Sent You" (UK No. 3 July 1971), the Newbeats' 1965 American hit "Run, Baby Run (Back Into My Arms)" (UK No. 10, October 1971), Bobby Hebb's "Love Love Love" which was originally the B-side of "A Satisfied Mind" (UK No. 32, August 1972), Robert Knight's "Love on a Mountain Top" recorded in 1968 (UK No. 10, November 1973) and R. Dean Taylor's "There's a Ghost in My House" from 1967 (UK No. 3, May 1974).

The Northern soul scene also spawned lesser chart hits, including Al Wilson's 1968 cut "The Snake" (UK No. 41 in 1975), Dobie Gray's "Out on the Floor" (UK No. 42, September 1975) and Little Anthony & the Imperials' "Better Use Your Head" (UK No. 42, July 1976).

Various recordings were made later in the 1970s specifically aimed at the Northern soul scene, which also went on to become UK top 40 hits. These included: the Exciters' "Reaching For the Best" (UK No. 31, October 1975), L. J. Johnson's "Your Magic Put a Spell on Me" (UK No. 27, February 1976), and Tommy Hunt's "Loving On the Losing Side" (UK No. 28, August 1976). "Goodbye Nothing To Say", by the white British group the Javells, was identified by Dave McAleer of Pye's Disco Demand label as having an authentic Northern soul feel. McAleer gave acetates to Wigan Casino DJs Russ Winstanley, Kev Roberts, Richard Searling (a Wigan Casino DJ and promoter), and the tune became popular among the dancers at the venue. Disco Demand then released the song as a 45 rpm single, reaching UK No. 26 in November 1974. To promote the single on BBC's Top of the Pops, the performer was accompanied by two Wigan Casino dancers.

In at least one case, a previously obscure recording was specially remixed to appeal to Northern soul fans: the 1968 recording "Footsee" by Canadian group the Chosen Few was sped up, overdubbed and remixed to emerge as the 1975 UK No. 9 hit "Footsee", now credited to Wigan's Chosen Few. Music journalist, Stuart Maconie, described the record as an "embarrassing novelty" and "execrable" in his autobiography, Cider With Roadies. In addition, the Northern soul favourite "Skiing in the Snow", originally by the Invitations, was covered by local band Wigan's Ovation, and reached No. 12 in the UK Singles Chart. These versions were not well received by the Northern soul community as their success brought wider awareness to the subculture. Maconie described this song as "a bland, modernised, easier to license version of a classic Northern tune originally by US artists", and said it "really stuck in the purists' craw even then".

The first domestic disco hit, "Kung Fu Fighting" (UK No. 1, 1974), which was created by singer Carl Douglas and producer Biddu in Britain, was influenced by the Northern soul scene.

In 2000, Wigan Casino DJ Kev Roberts compiled The Northern Soul Top 500, which was based on a survey of Northern soul fans. The top ten songs were: "Do I Love You (Indeed I Do)" by Frank Wilson, "Out on the Floor" by Dobie Gray, "You Didn't Say a Word" by Yvonne Baker, "The Snake" by Al Wilson, "Long After Tonight is Over" by Jimmy Radcliffe, "Seven Day Lover" by James Fountain, "You Don't Love Me" by Epitome of Sound, "Looking for You" by Garnet Mimms, "If That's What You Wanted" by Frankie Beverly & the Butlers and "Seven Days Too Long" by Chuck Wood.

== Fashion and imagery ==
A large proportion of Northern soul's original audience came from the 1960s mod subculture. In the late 1960s, when some mods started embracing freakbeat and psychedelic rock, other mods – especially those in Northern England – stuck to the original soundtrack of soul and Blue Beat. From the latter category, two strands emerged: skinheads and the Northern soul scene.

Early Northern soul fashion included strong elements of the classic mod style, such as button-down Ben Sherman shirts, blazers with centre vents and unusual numbers of buttons, trickers and brogue shoes and shrink-to-fit Levi's jeans. Some non-mod items, such as bowling shirts, were also popular. Later, Northern soul dancers started to wear light and loose-fitting clothing for reasons of practicality. This included high-waisted, baggy Oxford bags and sports vests. These were often covered with sew-on badges representing soul club memberships.

The clenched raised fist symbol that has become associated with the Northern soul movement emanates from the 1960s Black Power movement in the United States. On his visit to the Twisted Wheel in 1971, Dave Godin recalled that "...very many young fellows wore black "right on now" racing gloves ... between records one would hear the occasional cry of "right on now!" or see a clenched gloved fist rise over the tops of the heads of the dancers!"

In 2014, the clenched fist logo was subject to a trademark dispute in the UK after a bag retailer in Manchester tried to register the logo. The IPO refused the trademark, considering it generic. The ruling was unusual as it considered not just the usage from other manufacturers, but also its wide usage by members of the public to be relevant.

== Drugs ==
In 2007, Andrew Wilson (lecturer in criminology at the University of Sheffield) published the extensively researched sociological study Northern Soul: Music, drugs and subcultural identity. This work details the lifestyles associated with the Northern soul scene and the extensive use of amphetamines (otherwise known as speed) by many involved. Wilson argues that, although many did not use drugs, their usage was heavily ingrained in the fast-paced culture of the Northern soul scene, contributing to participants' ability to stay up all night dancing. Many clubs and events were closed down or refused licences due to the concern of local authorities that soul nights attracted drug dealers and users. Roger Eagle, DJ at the Twisted Wheel club in Manchester, cited amphetamine usage among participants as his reason for quitting the club in 1967. Of the regular attendees, he said, "All they wanted was fast-tempo black dance music... [but they were] too blocked on amphetamines to articulate exactly which Jackie Wilson record they wanted me to play." According to Hillegonda C. Rietveld, Northern soul "dancers were fuelled by...Dexedrine tablets".

== Cultural legacy ==
The Northern soul scene has notably influenced DJ culture and certain musicians and has been portrayed in literature, theatre and cinema. It also appeared in politics.

=== Influence on DJ culture ===
The Northern soul movement is cited by many as being a significant step towards the creation of contemporary club culture and the superstar DJ culture of the 2000s. Two of the most notable DJs from the original Northern soul era are Russ Winstanley and Ian Levine. As in contemporary club culture, Northern soul DJs built up a following based on satisfying the crowd's desire for music they could not hear anywhere else. The competitiveness between DJs to unearth 'in-demand' sounds led them to cover up the labels on their records, giving rise to the modern white label pressing. Many argue that Northern soul was instrumental in creating a network of clubs, DJs, record collectors and dealers in the UK. It was the first music scene to provide the British charts with records that sold entirely on the strength of club play.

A technique employed by Northern soul DJs in common with their later counterparts was the sequencing of records to create euphoric highs and lows for the crowd. DJ personalities and their followers involved in the original Northern soul movement went on to become important figures in the house and dance music scenes. Notable among these are Mike Pickering, who introduced house music to the Haçienda in Manchester in the 1980s; the influential DJ Colin Curtis; Neil Rushton, the A&R manager of the house music record label Kool Kat Music; and the dance record producers Pete Waterman, Johnathan Woodliffe, Ian Dewhirst and Ian Levine.

=== Radio ===
Former Casino DJ Richard Searling presents a weekly radio show on BBC Radio Manchester, BBC Radio Stoke and SOLAR Radio (Sunday at 10 am UK time) dedicated to Northern soul, whilst John Kane's Northern Soul is broadcast across various BBC local radio stations in the North of England.

"Northern soul with Tony Dellar" is broadcast each week on Cambridge community radio station Cambridge 105.

Australian DJ and PBS FM radio presenter Vince Peach absorbed the Northern soul culture at the Twisted Wheel, where he also DJed, and took it to Australia in 1982. He started a dedicated Northern soul radio programme called Soul Time in 1984, which continues and is believed to be the longest-running soul program in the world.

The Northern Soul Show with Stuart Blackburn has been broadcast weekly across various internet radio stations since 2010.

Craig Charles represents Northern soul in The Craig Charles Funk and Soul Show on BBC's Radio 6 Music.

Former Wigan Casino DJ Dave Evison presents the "Rolling Back the Carpets" Northern soul show every Sunday from 5 pm until 7 pm in the UK on The Hitmix 107.5.

=== Influence on musicians ===
Northern soul has influenced several notable musicians.

- Soft Cell had chart success in the early 1980s with covers of two popular Northern soul songs, "Tainted Love" (originally recorded by Gloria Jones) and "What?" (originally recorded by Melinda Marx on VJ, 1965, Judy Street 1966 and Tina Mason 1967). Soft Cell member Dave Ball attended soul nights at Blackpool Mecca and Wigan Casino occasionally.
- The Fall's 1981 song "Lie Dream of a Casino Soul" is about the Northern soul scene. Writer and singer Mark E. Smith said in an interview published in the NME on 1 October 1983: "That song actually did create quite a bit of resentment in the North because people thought it was being snobby and horrible about the old soul boys, which it was never about anyway. Because I was brought up with people that were into Northern soul five years before anybody down here [London] had even heard about it. But they've all grown out of it, which is what the song is about, but it wasn't putting them down at all. If anything, it was glorifying them, but not in the format of, where are those soul boys that used to be here?"
- Moloko's "Familiar Feeling" video is set against a Northern soul backdrop and directed by Elaine Constantine, a longstanding Northern soul enthusiast. The video was choreographed by DJ Keb Darge, who rose to prominence at the Stafford Top of the World all-nighters in the 1980s.
- Fatboy Slim's 1998 big beat single "The Rockafeller Skank" samples the Just Brothers' "Sliced Tomatoes". The song reached No. 6 in the UK Singles Chart and also had success in many other countries.
- The music video for Duffy's 2008 song "Mercy" features Duffy singing on a platform, accompanied by Northern soul dancers performing elaborate moves.
- Plan B's 2010 album, The Defamation of Strickland Banks, displays a significant Northern soul influence. The video for "Stay Too Long" features Northern soul-style dance moves such as spins, flips and backdrops. The album sleeve features Northern soul-style sew-on patches.
- The video for John Newman's "Love Me Again" featured Northern soul dancing as a backdrop to a Romeo and Juliet-style romance.
- The video for the Courteeners' "Are You in Love with a Notion?" featured Northern soul dancing.
- The video for Above & Beyond's "Sun & Moon" contained Northern soul dancing.
- Paul Stuart Davies recorded Northern Soul Reimagined EP in 2015, with guidance from Russ Winstanley, presenting classic Northern soul tracks in a new light.
- Above & Beyond's 2017 release "Northern Soul" contains lyrics describing Detroit and the Northern soul scene and also alludes to the decline of Detroit in the late 20th century.
- The 2025 music video for Elliot James Reay's song "Who Knew Dancing Was a Sin" features Reay dancing among Northern soul dancers. The song explores a partner's unfounded suspicion of infidelity, while in truth, Reay was just out dancing the night away to Northern soul.

=== Literature ===
The Northern soul subculture has spawned several memoirs, novels and short stories. Maxwell Murray's Crackin Up: A Tale of Sex Drugs and Northern Soul was published in 1999. Ian Snowball and Pete McKenna published In the Blood in 2012 and a volume including their All Souled Out short stories and Nightshift memoir in 2013. Both focus on the East London scene. Chris Rose's 2014 Wood, Talc and Mr J takes a more literary approach and is based on the Sheffield scene. The "Mr J" in the title is Chuck Jackson. Northern soul also features in Nick Hornby's Juliet, Naked.

Several academic texts have been written on the topic of the Northern soul scene, including The Northern Soul Scene (2019, Equinox) by Prof. Tim Wise (Birmingham City University), Dr Nicola Watchman Smith (Liverpool/ Advance HE) and Dr Sarah Raine.

=== Theatre ===
Northern Soul is the title of a 2012 theatre piece by the British visual and performance artist Victoria Melody. According to a description on the Solo Theatre website, 'Victoria, an untrained dancer, has been travelling the dance halls and living rooms of England being taught to dance by Northern Soul's ex-champions. Northern Soul draws on those investigations and explores the 'soul of the north' using film and original Northern Soul dance moves.'

=== Film ===
Films set in the Northern soul scene include 2010's Soulboy and 2014's Northern Soul.

=== Politics ===
The Greater Manchester mayor's Andy Burnham's 2026 campaign logo for Labour MP for Makerfied was by his own account directly inspired by Northern Soul. It features the clenched fist and the campaign slogan "Change Labour/Keep The Faith".

== See also ==
- Madchester
- Plastic soul

== Bibliography ==
- Kev Roberts (2000). The Northern Soul Top 500. Goldmine / Soul Supply Limited. ISBN 0-9539291-0-8.
- Nicola Smith (2012). 'Parenthood and the Transfer of Subcultural Capital in the Northern Soul Scene' in Ageing and Youth Culture. SAGE Publishing. ISBN 9781847888358.
- Tim Wall; Nicola Watchman Smith; Sarah Raine (2019). The Northern Soul Scene. EquinoxPublishing. ISBN 9781781795576.
