= Wigan Casino =

Former nightclub in Wigan, England

Coordinates: 53°32′47.24″N 2°37′44.48″W

The Wigan Casino is the colloquial name for the nightclub the Casino Club, that operated in Wigan between Friday, August 27 1965 (with Shirley Bassey topping the bill) and 1981, associated with the Northern soul movement in the UK. The club's enduring dedication to Northern soul "all nighters" made it an icon among fans of the genre, continuing the efforts that other clubs such as the Twisted Wheel in Manchester, the Chateau Impney (Droitwich), the Catacombs (Wolverhampton) and the Golden Torch (Tunstall, Stoke-on-Trent) had started. It remains one of the most famous clubs in Northern England. In 1978, allegedly the American music magazine Billboard voted Wigan Casino "The Best Disco in the World", ahead of New York City's Studio 54, although there is no tangible evidence of this award ever being publicised.

This England, a TV documentary about the Wigan Casino, was filmed in 1977. Russ Winstanley and Dave Nowell wrote a history of the club, Soul Survivors, The Wigan Casino Story, which was published in 1996. A stage play by Mick Martin about the Wigan Casino years, Once upon a time in Wigan, debuted in February 2003 at the Contact Theatre in Manchester and has since toured nationally.

== History ==
'The Casino Club' (known colloquially as Wigan Casino) was the name of the last incarnation of a Wigan ballroom called the Empress. Local DJs Brian Rigby and Alan Cain approached lease owner Gerry Marshall to run all-nighters. Venue manager Mike Walker brought in Russ Winstanley, who had a DJ set at the local rugby club, to the Casino. At 2 am on Sunday 23 September 1973, Wigan Casino started its first-ever Northern soul all-nighter, with Winstanley as the DJ. After Winstanley and his helper Ian Fishwick, Kev Roberts was the third DJ at Casino all-nighters, who was quickly joined by Richard Searling Soul performers that performed there include Jackie Wilson, Edwin Starr and Junior Walker.

Young people from all over the UK regularly attended Wigan Casino to hear the latest Northern soul artists and to dance. There were long queues to get in. The second dance floor, Mr M's, stayed open until 6 am and played oldies songs from a variety of DJs including Dave Evison and Steve Whittle. All-nighters generally ended with three songs that became known as the '3 before 8': "Time Will Pass You By" by Tobi Legend, "Long After Tonight Is All Over" by Jimmy Radcliffe, and "I'm on My Way" by Dean Parrish. Parrish (born Phil Anastasi) remained active on the Northern soul circuit until his death in 2021.

Wigan Casino's 500th all-nighter was held on Saturday 16 May 1981, from midnight to 8 am. Over the eight years it was open, it reputedly had over one million people through its doors.

Wigan Council owned the building and wanted to extend the nearby Civic Centre, but short of funding, it never went ahead. The club closed on 6 December 1981; that final night of Wigan Casino in its Northern soul state was DJ'd by Winstanley, and the '3 before 8' were played three times consecutively at the end of the night. The crowd refused to leave; according to Winstanley, to "break this spell of hysteria", he picked a 7" at random from his box and played that. This final Wigan Casino song became one of the most famous Northern soul songs of all time, Frank Wilson's "Do I Love You (Indeed I Do)". Annual reunions are held in Wigan and Blackpool hosted by various original DJs.

The Casino is commemorated with a Blue plaque, which was installed in 2014, marking the place where the doors to the club once stood.

The site is now occupied by the Grand Arcade shopping centre, which pays homage to the club with its Casino Café.

== See also ==
- Casino Classics: Chapter One (1979)
