= Russ Winstanley =

English DJ (born 1952)

Russ Winstanley (born 21 October 1952) is an English DJ, originating from Beech Hill, in Wigan, Lancashire.

== Early life ==
He attended Wigan Grammar School.

== Career ==
He is best known for his championing of Northern Soul music at the Wigan Casino. Since its closure in 1981, Winstanley has still been active, both on the Northern Soul circuit and in radio. He has hosted his own show on BBC GMR and XFM in Manchester, and has had a regular northern soul show on BBC Radio Lancashire.

On 23 September 1973, Winstanley had the idea for putting on and DJing at the Soul Allnighters at Wigan Casino. Over four million people passed through the venue, which ran four nights per week, until 6 December 1981. Both Wigan Casino and Winstanley won many awards for best venue and best DJ. In 1997, Winstanley compiled Telstar Records northern soul album Soul Survivors. In 1998, his book Wigan Casino Story joined the bestsellers' list.

He was also music consultant on the Bolton Octagon's re-staging of Once Upon A Time in Wigan. It was based loosely on Paul Sadot's original sell-out production of 2003. Ace/Kent Records released a CD compilation album in 2004. featuring music consultant and director, Paul Sadot's tracks from the original production.
