= British Hit Singles & Albums =

Music reference book

- Language: English
- Subject: Music
- Genre: Reference
- Publication place: United Kingdom

British Hit Singles & Albums (originally known as The Guinness Book of British Hit Singles and The Guinness Book of British Hit Albums) was a music reference book originally published in the United Kingdom by the publishing arm of the Guinness breweries, Guinness Superlatives. Later editions were published by HIT Entertainment (who had bought the Guinness World Records brand). It listed all the singles and albums featured in the Top 75 pop charts in the UK. In 2004 the book became an amalgamation of two earlier Guinness publications, originally known as British Hit Singles and British Hit Albums. The publication of this amalgamation ceased in 2006, with Guinness World Records being sold to The Jim Pattison Group, owner of Ripley's Believe It or Not! At this point, the Official UK Charts Company teamed up with Random House/Ebury Publishing to release a new version of the book under the Virgin Books brand. Entitled The Virgin Book of British Hit Singles, it was first published in November 2008 with a separate albums book and second edition being published over the next couple of years.

The first ten editions of The Guinness Book of British Hit Singles were compiled by Paul Gambaccini, Mike Read and brothers Tim Rice and Jonathan (Jo) Rice (known as GRRR). Read left the team in the mid-1980s (with the book copyright now belonging to GRR Publications Ltd) and the other editors resigned in 1996. Chart editor for many editions was David Roberts.

== Content ==
British Hit Singles & Albums was generally considered to be the authoritative reference (and only) source for both the UK singles chart (since its inception in 1952) and the UK Albums Chart. It listed all the singles and albums ever to have been in the UK charts since 1952 (albums since 1958), listing them in alphabetical order and by both artist and song title. The entries also included the date of chart entry, highest position, catalogue number and number of weeks in the chart. Short biographical notes accompanied many of the artists' chart details.

The book's sources are the New Musical Express (NME) chart from November 1952 to March 1960, and the Record Retailer (later Music Week) chart thereafter. It could be said that this division is misleading, since the Record Retailer chart was little known until it was adopted by the BBC in 1969 and that by adopting this chart as its standard, the editors had a non-consensual view. An example often given is the case of the Beatles' second single "Please Please Me" which was recognised as a number one hit by every other publicly available chart of the time, but not by Record Retailer and therefore not by British Hit Singles. Other records to which this applies include "19th Nervous Breakdown" by the Rolling Stones, "Stranger on the Shore" by Acker Bilk and the Eurovision Song Contest entry "Are You Sure?" by the Allisons.

Even after February 1969 the BBC-approved chart, as used by the Book of British Hit Singles, suffered from errors. Reasons for these include low, late, unusable, or even complete lack of returns from record shops used to compile the chart. Typically only around 10% of stores sent in properly detailed sales information on time. The other major problem was "chart hyping". There were two main forms of this. The first was for record companies, or artists' management, to simply buy positions for their records in the chart. The second was, knowing that only 10% of sampled stores reliably sent in sales info, to find out which stores those were, and then send in "customers" to buy out all the stock of a particular record in those specific stores in a particular week, thus artificially giving that record a high chart placing. As such, even through the 1970s and 1980s many books on British chart history referred to the New Musical Express and/or Melody Maker chart.

Co-founder Jo Rice has defended the book's choice of source material on the grounds that Record Retailer was the only chart to consistently publish a Top 50 from 1960 onwards. This can be substantiated by the fact that charts published in the NME were of a shorter format and other chart listings such as those in Melody Maker, became less and less informative although they were probably more accurate. Subsequent research has shown that during the "disputed" period of the 1960s, the sample sizes of the Record Retailer chart were considerably inferior to those of the other charts: around 30 shops in 1963 in comparison to more than 100 used by Melody Maker, and later around 80 in comparison to NME's 150 and Melody Maker's 200. As a result, the placings in that chart were more open to error and manipulation – a situation further worsened by the larger number of records listed in the chart.

== History ==
=== 1977–1996 original editors ===
The cover of the 1989 7th edition of the Guinness Book of British Hit Singles

The first edition was published as The Guinness Book of British Hit Singles in November 1977. It was not the first Guinness music reference publication, as the previous year a book called The Guinness Book of Music Facts & Feats had been published. It also contained feats from the world of classical music.

The first edition was issued to coincide with the 25th anniversary of the first UK singles sales chart, which was published in November 1952, by the New Musical Express. Subsequently, a new edition was published every two years, adding a few hundred titles to each edition.

Keeping in line with the book's parent publication The Guinness Book of Records, each edition of British Hit Singles also contained a 'facts and feats' section, which included various lists of remarkable chart feats such as 'most hits', 'most no. 1 hits', 'most weeks on chart' or 'Least successful chart artist'. Also included in the books were photographs (often with captions) and introductions written by the four authors. They also wrote a bi-annual lookback on the major developments in the UK charts in the two preceding years.

The series was soon regarded as the number one source for music and chart reference, thanks to the commercial success of the books and its various sister publications (see below).

The series' 10th edition, published in June 1995, was the last to feature its original authors Rice, Rice and Gambaccini. From the 11th edition onwards, the book was compiled by in-house editors at Guinness Publishing and, later, by David Roberts who had already been a chart editor and designer for the original team.

=== 1997–2006 ===
From the 12th edition onwards (published in 1999), the book was published every year rather than bi-annually. In 2004, the book merged with The Guinness Book of British Hit Albums to form The Guinness Book of British Hit Singles & Albums. The eighteenth edition of the book (2005) was billed as a "Special Collector's Edition" as it featured detailed information on the 1,000 Number Ones in the UK singles chart from Al Martino's "Here in My Heart" on 14 November 1952 to Elvis Presley's "One Night / I Got Stung" (Limited Edition Collector's re-issue), 22 January 2005. The 19th edition (2006) was the last in the series. A supposed 20th edition was due to be published in 2007, but apparently the original publishers lost interest in chart reference books after their contract with The Official Charts Company expired, which saw that organisation sell the contract to Virgin.

=== Features in each edition ===
Edition	Publication date	Publisher and ISBN	Extra features	Editor
1	1977	Guinness Superlatives - 0-900424-83-4	Short history of the UK charts. Contains a short tribute to Elvis Presley at the end of the book, added immediately after his death shortly before the book went to press.	Unknown
2	1979	GRRR Books Ltd/Guinness Superlatives - 0-900424-99-0	British Hit Singles Part 1 Alphabetical by Artist Part 2 Alphabetical by Title................................- Act, (position) & year of chart entry Part 3 Facts and Feats ............. (headings shown on front index sheet - not listed *)..The first ever chart ...........................................- 14 November 1952 NMExpress..Most weeks on chart ........................................ - rank, Act, weeks...Most hits .......................................................... - qty, Act, any supporting artist(s)...Most Top Ten hits ............................................ - qty, Act, any supporting artist(s)...The Number One hits ...................................... - by year, by month, title, Act...Most hits in one year ...................................... - Act, qty...Most Number One hits ..................................... - qty, Act...Number One hat-tricks ..................................... - Act, qty, title thro' to title...One-hit Wonders ............................................. - Act, weeks...Least successful chart acts ............................. - (1 week @ 50) Act, title, year...Most hits without a Number One hit ................. - qty, Act..* Most Top Ten hits without a Number One hit .. - qty, Act...Most consecutive years on the charts ............. - qty, Act, period...Most weeks at Number One (for one disc) ...... - weeks, title, Act, year........................................................(by Act)....... - weeks, Act, year........................(by Act in one calendar year)...... - weeks, Act, year...Most weeks on charts - recordings (by title)..... - weeks, Act...Most popular songs (by title) ..... - times recorded, Act, chart place.	Mike Charlwood
3	1981	GRRR Books Ltd/Guinness Superlatives - 0-85112-224-8	Front cover montage of artists with most weeks on chart in each calendar year. Dedicated to John Lennon. Feature on the three-hour temporary stay at number 1 in 1976 by Manuel and the Music of the Mountains' "Rodrigo's Guitar Concerto d'Aranjuez". Top 100 chart hits of all time, calculated on a points system. Winners and British entries in Eurovision Song Contest each year. List of favourite singles of various chart artists.	Alex Reid, Melanie Georgi & Peter Matthews
4	1983	GRRR Books Ltd/Guinness Superlatives - 0-85112-259-0	Cover painting (by Robert Heesom) featuring 50 song titles. Chart analysis of 1981 and 1982.	Alex E. Reid (Editorial Associate: Steve Smith)
5	1985	GRRR Books Ltd/Guinness Superlatives - 0-85112-429-1	New lay out and typeset. Launch of the GRRR Golden Hitline (telephone line featuring music). Dedicated to Bob Geldof, Midge Ure and all artists featured in Band Aid. Chart analysis of 1983 and 1984.	Alex E. Reid
6	1987	GRR Publications/Guinness Superlatives - 0-85112-823-8	First edition without Mike Read. First edition to sport the new British Hit Singles logo (and also used in all subsequent editions). Chart analysis of 1985 and 1986.	Honor Head (Editorial Associates: Nick Todd and Alan Golub)
7	1989	GRR Publications/Guinness Publishing - 0-85112-339-2	Chart analysis of 1987 and 1988.	Honor Head (Editorial Associate: Tony Brown)
8	1991	GRR Publications/Guinness Publishing - 0-85112-941-2	Chart analysis of 1989 and 1990.	David Roberts (Editorial Associate: Tony Brown)
9	1993	GRR Publications - 0-85112-526-3	Tagline "Now a million seller" added. For the first time, all hits by the same artist were combined (previously, solo hits and collaborations such as duets were listed separately). Chart analysis of 1991 and 1992.	David Roberts (Editorial Associate: Tony Brown)
10	1995	GRR Publications - 0-85112-633-2	New typeset. Chart analysis of 1993 and 1994.	David Roberts (Editorial Associate: Tony Brown)
11	1997	Guinness Publishing - 0-85112-027-X	First edition not made by the Gambaccini/Rice/Rice team. From now on, book was compiled and edited by in-house staff at Guinness, with Helen Weller listed as editor. Introduction written by Mark Lamarr.	Helen Weller
12	1999	Guinness Publishing - 0-85112-092-X	From now on, book was published annually. New typeset and lay out. More news and reviews stories with introduction written by Dave McAleer. Revamped 'facts and feats' section with many new records.	Jane Bolton (Chief Consultant: Dave McAleer)
13	2000	Guinness Publishing - 0-85112-111-X	News and reviews from the year 1999.	David Roberts
14	2001	Guinness World Records - 0-85112-156-X	News and reviews from 2000. 'Facts and feats' section reduced to one page ("Top 10 Record-Breaking Facts"), but trivia added to list of every Number One since 1952.	David Roberts (Chief Consultant: Dave McAleer)
15	2002	Guinness World Records - 0-85112-187-X	Special 'gold' edition celebrating 50 years of UK Singles Charts and 25 years of British Hit Singles. Review of 2001.	David Roberts (Chief Consultant: Dave McAleer)
16	2003	Hit Entertainment/Guinness World Records - 0-85112-190-X	Pop review of the year 2002.	David Roberts (Chief Consultant: Dave McAleer)
17	2004	Hit Entertainment/Guinness World Records - 0-85112-199-3	For the first time, singles and albums were combined in one volume. Singles were listed in black typeface, albums in red. Review of the year 2003.	David Roberts (Chief Consultant: Dave McAleer)
18	2005	Hit Entertainment/Guinness World Records - 1-904994-00-8	Special edition celebrating 1,000 UK Number One hits (1952-2005). Review of the year 2004.	David Roberts (Chief Consultant: Dave McAleer)
19	2006	Hit Entertainment/Guinness World Records - 1-904994-10-5	A "Number One Timeline" running throughout the book, listing every number one single and album since 1952. Final book in the series.	David Roberts (Chief Consultant: Dave McAleer)

== Associated merchandise ==
Following the success of the Guinness Book of British Hit Singles series, the original authors and Guinness quickly turned to other charts-related books and projects. The following books were written by them:

- The Guinness Book of Hits of the 70s (1980)
- The Guinness Book of 500 Number One Hits (1982)
- The Guinness Book of British Hit Albums (first issued in 1983, second edition in 1986 with bi-annual updates until 1996)
- The Guinness Book of Hits of the 60s (1984)
- The Guinness Hits Challenge (a pop quiz book) (1984)
- The Guinness Hits Challenge 2 (1985)
- The Guinness Book of Number One Hits (2nd edition) (1988)
- UK Top 1000 Singles (1988)
- Hits of the 80s (1990)
- The Guinness Hits Quiz (1990)
- Guinness Top 40 Charts (1992)
- The Guinness Hits Quiz 2 (1992)
- UK Top 1000 Singles 2 (1993)
- The Guinness Book of Number One Hits (3rd edition) (1994)
- Guinness Top 40 Charts 2 (1996)

In the late 1990s and 2000s several other merchandise was produced, such as karaoke CDs, a calendar, a DVD quiz (British Hit Albums and Singles No. 1 Music Quiz) and a series of themed compilation CDs with original hits from the book.

== See also ==
- The Virgin Book of British Hit Singles
- Fred Bronson – author of The Billboard Book of USA Number One Hits (in the UK, also published by Guinness Books)
- Joel Whitburn – author of The Billboard Book of USA Top 40 (in the UK, also published by Guinness Books)

== References and further reading ==
- Roberts, David. Guinness Book of British Hit Singles & Albums. Guinness World Records Ltd. 18th edition (May 2005). ISBN 1-904994-00-8
- Roberts, David. Guinness Book of British Hit Singles & Albums. Guinness World Records Ltd. 19th edition (June 2006). ISBN 1-904994-10-5
- Roach, Martin. The Virgin Book of British Hit Singles. Virgin Books (Nov. 2008). ISBN 0-7535-1537-7
- McAleer, Dave. The Virgin Book of British Hit Singles – Volume 2. Virgin Books (Nov. 2010). ISBN 978-0-7535-2245-5
