= Spotlight Publications =

Spotlight Publications was a music business information company based in London, England that published music magazines in the United Kingdom from 1953 to 2010, with some expansion into the United States.

== Publications ==
- Gavin Report, US magazine acquired in November 1992.
- Kerrang!.
- Miro, music information service, acquired in 1993.
- Music Week.
  - Charts Plus, subscription chart newsletter.
  - Hit Music, subscription chart newsletter.
  - Video Week.
  - Studio Week.
- Noise (Teenybopper magazine).
- Record Mirror.
- Sounds.

== Music charts ==
=== Entertainment Research & Analysis ===
In April 1991, Spotlight Publications created ERA (Entertainment Research & Analysis) which compiled the UK Airplay Chart, BBC Radio 1's rock chart, as well as the Charts Plus subscription newsletter.

=== The Network Chart ===
The UK Network Chart was compiled by Spotlight Publications from July 1993 onward after they beat MRIB to the contract who had compiled it since it started in 1984.
