= Dave McAleer =

British music consultant (born 1945)

David James McAleer (born 4 February 1945) is the main contributor for The Virgin Book of British Hit Singles, The Virgin Book of British Hit Albums and the Virgin Book of Top 40 Charts, and was the sole music consultant for Guinness World Records between 1998 and 2011. McAleer is currently the OCC ("Oldies Chart Consultant") to the Official Charts Company. He was the Chief Consultant/Contributor for the Guinness Book of British Hit Singles & Albums (now discontinued) for nine years, and has written or co-written over forty published music books.

He was one of the UK's first club DJs in 1963, before spending 25 years in the record business. McAleer worked in A&R for labels including RCA Records, Pye Records, DJM Records, Stax Records, Chess Records, Disco Demand, Sugarhill, Calibre, Champagne, Hi, Solar, CTI Records, TMT and Buddah Records, and was managing director of Barry White's label, 20th Century Records. During this period he was responsible for many chart entries (including Footsee), and helped introduce disco, Northern soul, rap and hip hop in the UK.

McAleer was the UK record executive behind the first rap hit, "Rapper's Delight" by the Sugarhill Gang. He managed the RAH Band and gave the first production jobs to noted DJs Paul Oakenfold and Ian Levine. In 1976, McAleer was the organiser of the first UK music industry pop quiz.

== Author ==
- Now That's What I Call a Decade of Hits – The 1980s (1989)
- The Omnibus Book of British & American Hit Singles (1990)
- Chart Beats (1991)
- Beat Boom (1992)
- Labatts Top 500 Records (1993)
- Hit Parade Heroes: British Beat Before The Beatles (1993)
- The Fab British Rock 'n' Roll Invasion of 1964 (1994)
- All Music Book of Hit Singles (1994)
- The Warner Guide to UK & US Hit Albums (1995)
- The Warner Guide to UK & US Hit Singles (1996)
- The Encyclopedia of Hits – The 1960s (1996)
- The Encyclopedia of Hits – The 1950s (1997)
- The Book of Hit Singles (2001)
- The Music Downloader's Source Book: The Complete A-Z of the World's Best Songs (2005)
- Guinness Book of British Hit Singles (1999 to 2006)
- Guinness Book of British Hit Singles & Albums (2004, 2005, 2006)
- Official Ultimate 80s Pop Quiz Books (2009)
- Virgin Book of Hit Albums (2009)
- Virgin Book of Top 40 Charts (2009)
- Virgin Book of Hit Singles (2010)
- Hit Singles: Top 20 Charts from 1954 to the Present Day (1999, 2004, 2007, 2010)
- Official Charts Company Book of Million Sellers (2012)
- British Hit Singles – The Missing Charts 1940-1952 (2013)

He has also co-written books including The NME Rock ’n’ Roll Years, The Guinness Who Who of 50s/60s/70s and Soul Music, The NME Who’s Who of Rock, Guinness Rockopedia, The Guinness Encyclopedia of Popular Music, The Virgin Ultimate Rock Encyclopedia, This Day in Rock, The Virgin Who Who of 50s/60s/70s and Soul Music.

In addition he has compiled/sequenced/written sleeve notes for over 1500 albums for companies such as Universal, EMI, Sony/BMG and Time Life.
