= List of Official Subscription Plays Chart number-one songs of the 2010s =

This is the list of the number ones of the Official Subscription Plays Chart between 2009 and 2013. The chart was no longer compiled after November 2013.

== Number-one songs ==
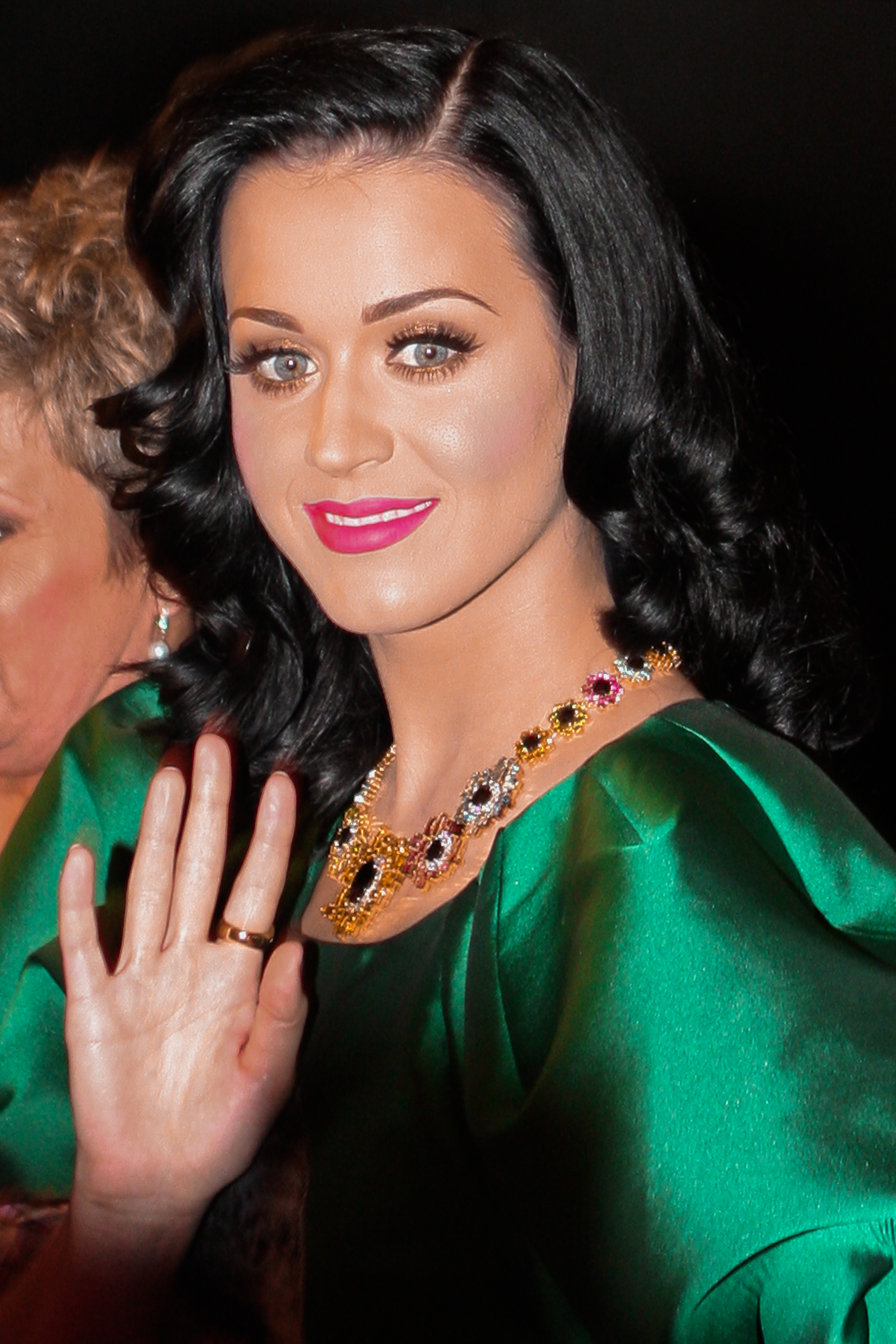
Singer Katy Perry has topped the Official Subscription Plays Chart with three songs during the 2010s.

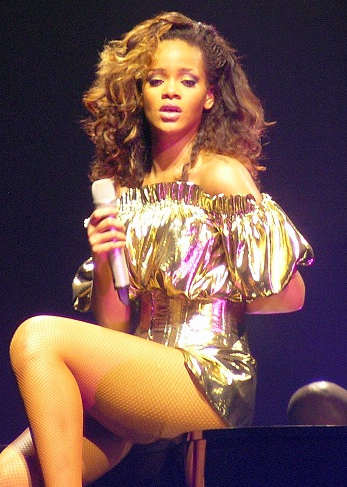
Rihanna has reached number one with four songs, more than any other artist.

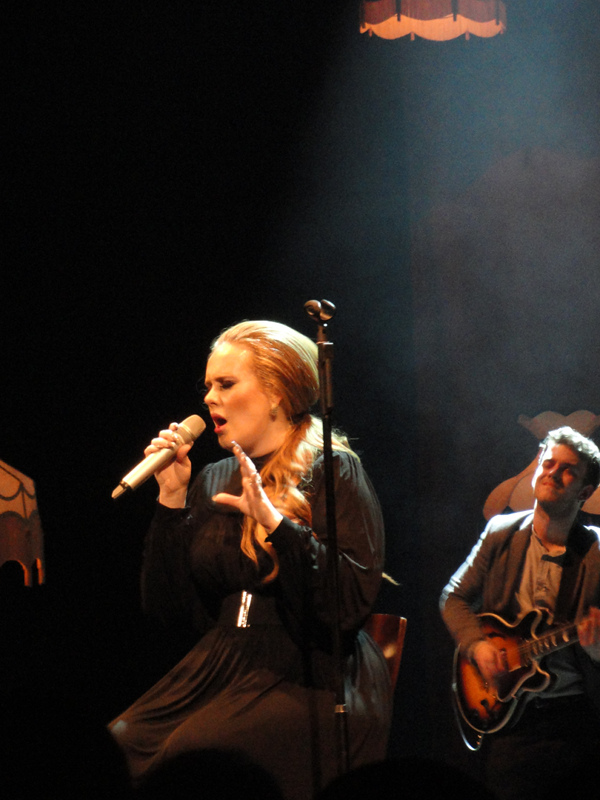
British singer Adele has spent 23 weeks at the top of the chart this decade, longer than any other act.

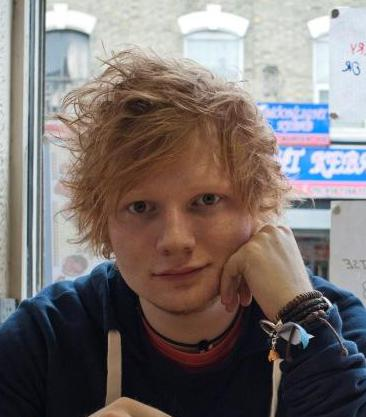
Ed Sheeran has spent 10 weeks at number one so far during the 2010s.

Artist (Note: The artist, song, date of reaching number one and number of weeks at number one are those given by the Official Charts Company.)	Song	Record label (Note: The record labels are those given by Official Charts Company.)	Reached number one	Weeks at number one
2010
Mariah Carey	"All I Want for Christmas Is You"	Columbia	27 December 2009	1
Lady Gaga	"Bad Romance"	Interscope	3 January 2010	3
Iyaz	"Replay"	Reprise	24 January 2010	1
Owl City	"Fireflies"	Island	31 January 2010	6
Ellie Goulding	"Starry Eyed"	Polydor	14 March 2010	3
Lady Gaga featuring Beyoncé	"Telephone"	Interscope	4 April 2010	2
Scouting for Girls	"This Ain't a Love Song"	Epic	18 April 2010	2
Plan B	"She Said"	679/Atlantic	2 May 2010	1
Diana Vickers	"Once"	RCA	9 May 2010	1
Plan B	"She Said"	679/Atlantic	16 May 2010	2
Roll Deep	"Good Times"	Relentless/Virgin	30 May 2010	1
Jason Derülo	"Ridin' Solo"	Warner Bros.	6 June 2010	2
K'naan	"Wavin' Flag"	A&M	20 June 2010	3
Katy Perry featuring Snoop Dogg	"California Gurls"	Virgin	11 July 2010	4
Eminem featuring Rihanna	"Love the Way You Lie"	Polydor	8 August 2010	5
Katy Perry	"Teenage Dream"	Virgin	12 September 2010	4
Bruno Mars	"Just the Way You Are"	Elektra	10 October 2010	4
Cee Lo Green	"Forget You"	Warner Bros.	7 November 2010	2
Rihanna	"Only Girl (In the World)"	Def Jam	21 November 2010	3
Ellie Goulding	"Your Song"	Polydor	12 December 2010	2
Take That	"The Flood"	Polydor	26 December 2010	2
2011
Rihanna featuring Drake	"What's My Name?"	Def Jam	9 January 2011	2
Bruno Mars	"Grenade"	Elektra	23 January 2011	1
Adele	"Rolling in the Deep"	XL	30 January 2011	6
Adele	"Someone Like You"	XL	13 March 2011	16
Aloe Blacc	"I Need a Dollar"	Epic	3 July 2011	1
Adele	"Someone Like You"	XL	10 July 2011	1
Ed Sheeran	"The A Team"	Asylum	17 July 2011	8
Maroon 5 featuring Christina Aguilera	"Moves Like Jagger"	A&M/Octone	11 September 2011	2
Ed Sheeran	"The A Team"	Asylum	25 September 2011	1
Maroon 5 featuring Christina Aguilera	"Moves Like Jagger"	A&M/Octone	2 October 2011	5
Rihanna featuring Calvin Harris	"We Found Love"	Def Jam	6 November 2011	6
Michael Bublé	"It's Beginning to Look a Lot Like Christmas"	Reprise	18 December 2011	3
2012
Rihanna featuring Calvin Harris	"We Found Love"	Def Jam	8 January 2012	5
Ed Sheeran	"Lego House"	Asylum	12 February 2012	1
Gotye featuring Kimbra	"Somebody That I Used to Know"	Island	19 February 2012	9
Carly Rae Jepsen	"Call Me Maybe"	Interscope	22 April 2012	9
Cheryl	"Call My Name"	Polydor	24 June 2012	1
Maroon 5 featuring Wiz Khalifa	"Payphone"	A&M/Octone	1 July 2012	6
Calvin Harris featuring Example	"We'll Be Coming Back"	Columbia	12 August 2012	1
Wiley featuring Ms D	"Heatwave"	One More Tune/Warner Bros.	19 August 2012	3
Sam and the Womp	"Bom Bom"	One More Tune/Stiff	9 September 2012	1
The Script featuring will.i.am	"Hall of Fame"	Epic/Phonogenic	16 September 2012	2
Psy	"Gangnam Style"	Island	30 September 2012	11
James Arthur	"Impossible"	Syco	16 December 2012	4
2013
Psy	"Gangnam Style"	Island	13 January 2013	1
50 Cent featuring Eminem and Adam Levine	"My Life"	Interscope	20 January 2013	1
James Arthur	"Impossible"	Syco	27 January 2013	1
Psy	"Gangnam Style"	Island	3 February 2013	1
Bruno Mars	"Locked Out of Heaven"	Atlantic	10 February 2013	1
Macklemore and Ryan Lewis featuring Wanz	"Thrift Shop"	Macklemore	17 February 2013	4
Bastille	"Pompeii"	Virgin	17 March 2013	1
Macklemore and Ryan Lewis featuring Wanz	"Thrift Shop"	Macklemore	24 March 2013	3
Bruno Mars	"Locked Out of Heaven"	Atlantic	14 April 2013	1
Macklemore and Ryan Lewis featuring Wanz	"Thrift Shop"	Macklemore	21 April 2013	1
Daft Punk featuring Pharrell Williams	"Get Lucky"	Columbia	28 April 2013	8
Robin Thicke featuring T.I. and Pharrell	"Blurred Lines"	Interscope	23 June 2013	1
Daft Punk featuring Pharrell Williams	"Get Lucky"	Columbia	30 June 2013	1
Naughty Boy featuring Sam Smith	"La La La"	Virgin	7 July 2013	1
Robin Thicke featuring T.I. and Pharrell	"Blurred Lines"	Interscope	14 July 2013	1
Avicii	"Wake Me Up!"	Positiva/PRMD	21 July 2013	3
Robin Thicke featuring T.I. and Pharrell	"Blurred Lines"	Interscope	11 August 2013	1
Avicii	"Wake Me Up!"	Positiva/PRMD	18 August 2013	3
Ellie Goulding	"Burn"	Polydor	8 September 2013	1
Katy Perry	"Roar"	Virgin	15 September 2013	2
OneRepublic	"Counting Stars"	Interscope	29 September 2013	6

=== By artist ===
As of 9 November 2013, seven artists have spent 10 or more weeks at the top of the Official Subscription Plays Chart so far during the 2010s. The totals below include only credited performances.

Artist	Number-one songs	Weeks at number one
Adele	2	23
Rihanna	4	20
Maroon 5	2	13
Psy	1	13
Calvin Harris	2	12
Pharrell Williams	2	12
Katy Perry	3	10
Ed Sheeran	2	10

=== By record label ===
As of 9 November 2013, nine record labels have spent 10 or more weeks at the top of the Official Subscription Plays Chart so far during the 2010s.

Record label	Number-one songs	Weeks at number one
Island Records	3	28
Interscope	6	23
XL Records	2	23
Def Jam Records	3	16
Polydor Records	6	14
Virgin Records	6	13
A&M/Octone Records	2	13
Asylum Records	2	10
Columbia Records	2	10
