= UKChartsPlus =

Independent weekly newsletter about the UK music charts

- New UKChartsPlus logo (June 2010)
- Editor: Chris Wall
- Categories: Entertainment industry
- Frequency: Weekly
- Publisher: UKChartsPlus
- First issue: 1 September 2001; 23 years ago
- Company: Official Charts Company
- Country: England
- Based in: London
- Website: UKChartsPlus.co.uk

UKChartsPlus is an independent weekly newsletter about the UK music charts. It was first published in September 2001 as ChartsPlus in order to authoritatively record the official music chart information in the UK, as compiled by the Official Charts Company. It began after Hit Music, a sister publication of Music Week, ceased publication in May 2001. The new newsletter was established totally independent of Music Week, licensing the chart data directly from Official Charts Company and other chart providers.

== History ==
Initially, the newsletter covered:

- The UK Singles Chart up to number 200
- The UK Albums Chart up to number 200
- The Compilation Album Chart up to number 50

It also included a New Entries Spotlight on all new top 200 singles, and a Year to Date collection of all the current year's Top 200 albums and singles.

Since then, it has expanded to include the BPI silver, gold or platinum sales awards, predictions of the success of forthcoming releases, Budget Albums Top 50, Airplay Top 100, and Downloads Top 40. The Welsh Singles and Albums Top 75s and the Scottish Singles and Albums Top 75s are published in reference to the main UK Top 200 listings. It also published genre specific charts, for Indie, Dance, Rock and R&B.

Some of these charts are exclusive to ChartsPlus and it is the only site that publish the UK Singles Chart and UK Albums Chart positions below 75, as is the case for the Compilation Album Chart for positions below 40.

In October 2008, publisher Musiqware Ltd. (formerly IQware Ltd.) ceased production of ChartsPlus: the last issue published was number 371 (4 October 2008). In December 2008, ChartsPlus was relaunched by new publisher UKChartsPlus; the first issue under new ownership was number 383 (27 December 2008). Issues 372-382 were issued retrospectively between January and March 2009.

== 2010 relaunch ==
With issue no. 463 (10 July 2010) the publication was relaunched under the new title "UKChartsPlus", featuring a new cover (with hyperlinked index), several new charts, and some expanded charts, and a new colour scheme. It now also features a singles index and an albums index showing each entry's chart positions across all charts featured in UKChartsPlus.

The range of charts (chart provider, in parentheses, Official Charts Company unless otherwise stated):

- Top 200 Singles (reduced to only Top 100 Singles as of issue 829, dated 15 July 2017, after OCC stopped compiling positions 101-200 because of a new rule whereby no more than three tracks from one album can feature on the singles chart in the same week).
- Top 200 Artist Albums
- Top 200 Download Songs
- Top 100 Audio Streaming Songs (from issue no. 672, 12 July 2014)
- Top 100 Download Albums
- Top 50 Compilation Albums
- Top 50 Budget Albums
- Top 40 Vinyl Albums
- Top 40 Dance Singles & Albums
- Top 50 R&B Singles & Albums
- Top 40 Rock/Metal Singles & Albums
- Top 50 Indie Singles & Albums
- Top 20 Indie Breakers Singles & Albums
- Top 100 Year So Far Singles & Albums
- Top 75 Scottish Singles & Albums (with reference to main chart)
- Top 75 Welsh Singles & Albums (with reference to main chart)
- UK Radio Airplay Top 100 (NMC), from July 2013: UK Radio Airplay Top 200 (Radio Monitor)
- UK TV Airplay Top 40 (NMC), from July 2013: UK TV Airplay Top 40 (Radio Monitor)
- The Big Top 40 (Global Radio)

Other features:

- New Entries Spotlight: Singles (Top 200)
- New Entries Spotlight: Albums (Top 100)
- UKChartsPlus Singles Index
- UKChartsPlus Albums Index
- BPI Sales Awards (BPI)
- NMC Airplay Awards (NMC), from July 2013: UKChartsPlus Airplay Awards (based on Radio Monitor data)

Occasional additions:

- Michael Jackson Performance Chart
- Beatles Performance Chart
- Football Songs Chart (based on OCC data)
- Christmas Songs Chart (based on OCC data)
- Lonnie's Random Observations

== Subscriptions and back issues ==
As of February 2011, there are two subscription services available, the full and the express versions (downloads: only Top 50, Year So Far: only Top 75s, no UK TV Airplay Top 40, The Big Top 40, Indie Breakers, Vinyl Top 40, Index). Back issues are available, separately, or in quarterly or annual batches.

== See also ==
- Charts Plus (1991–1994 publication)
- Hit Music
- Music Week
- UK Albums Chart
- UK Singles Chart
- UK Album Downloads Chart
- UK Singles Downloads Chart
