= Charts Plus (1990s publication) =

Former British chart newsletter

- Editor: Graham Walker and Tony Brown
- Categories: Entertainment industry
- Frequency: Weekly
- Publisher: Spotlight Publications
- First issue: May 1991
- Final issue: November 1994
- Based in: London, England, UK

Charts Plus was a weekly British chart newsletter that published the official Top 200 UK singles and Top 200 UK albums charts. It was a sister publication to the British music magazine Music Week which itself only published the Top 75 UK singles and albums charts. Charts Plus was published from 1991 to 1994.

== Origins ==
Charts Plus was edited by Graham Walker and Tony Brown and was established in May 1991, shortly after the demise of Record Mirror. Charts Plus featured the singles chart with positions 76 to 200, albums chart positions 76 to 200, plus several genre and format chart, details on every Top 75 new entry, radio playlists (later the E.R.A. Top 100 Airplay charts) and statistics. An annual subscription to Charts Plus cost £495.

== Information included ==
Subscription to Charts Plus would offer the following information in the newsletter:

- Singles positions 76-200.
- Albums positions 76-200.
- Commentary on new entries into the top 75.
- Market shares by format.
- Special chart research features.
- Playlisted singles by radio station (Airplay charts).
- Format charts for singles and albums.
- Import albums chart.
- Jazz and Blues chart.
- Titles dropping out of the top 75.
- Top 10 positions for major overseas markets and no. 1's for secondary markets.
- Scottish charts.

== Demise ==
In September 1992, Spotlight, publishers of Music Week, started Hit Music as a cheaper alternative to Charts Plus. For only £110 Hit Music printed the singles chart (Top 75+25, i.e. with compressed positions 76 to 100), artist albums (Top 100), compilation albums (Top 50), rock chart and dance chart (Top 20s), US Top 10s, plus details on Top 75 new entries, chart statistics, year-to-date charts (singles, albums, singles acts, album acts, Top 30s) listings of BPI awards, and national number ones.

In November 1994, Charts Plus ceased publication and Hit Music then began publishing the (uncompressed) Top 200 singles and Top 200 albums charts from issue no. 111 (19 November 1994). Hit Music also published the Top 150 Artists Albums, and Top 50 Compilations. Hit Music itself later folded, together with several other Music Week newsletters, the last issue of Hit Music that was published was no. 439 (5 May 2001). This meant that there was no longer a published source for the Top 200 singles and Top 200 albums charts. However, by autumn 2001, a successor publication to Hit Music was founded, independent of Music Week, in order to publish the British Top 200 charts: ChartsPlus (not to be confused with the 1990s publication of the same name). The ChartsPlus which was started in 2001 was renamed UKChartsPlus in 2010.

== See also ==
- UK Singles Chart
- UK Albums Chart
