= Hit Music =

Weekly British chart newsletter

- Hit Music magazine front cover December 25, 1993
- Editor: Graham Walker and Tony Brown
- Categories: Entertainment industry
- Frequency: Weekly
- Publisher: Spotlight Publications
- First issue: 5 September 1992; 32 years ago
- Final issue: 5 May 2001
- Based in: London, England, UK

Hit Music was a weekly British chart newsletter; sister publication to Music Week. Hit Music existed for almost nine years, supplying the official UK music charts (as compiled by Gallup and later OCC/CIN). The founding editors were Graham Walker and Tony Brown. The first issue was published September 5, 1992 (chart date: September 12, 1992), the last issue was May 5, 2001 (no. 439).

== History ==
Originally it ran parallel to Music Week′s other chart newsletter Charts Plus which was also edited by Graham Walker and Tony Brown and which had been established in May 1991, shortly after the demise of Record Mirror. Charts Plus featured the singles chart with positions 76 to 200, albums chart positions 76 to 200, plus several genre and format chart, details on every Top 75 new entry, radio playlists (later the E.R.A. Top 100 Airplay charts) and statistics. An annual subscription to Charts Plus cost £495.

In September 1992, Spotlight, publishers of Music Week, started Hit Music as a cheaper alternative. For only £110 Hit Music printed the singles chart (Top 75+25, i.e. with compressed positions 76 to 100), artist albums (Top 100), compilation albums (Top 50), rock chart and dance chart (Top 20s), US Top 10s, plus details on Top 75 new entries, chart statistics, year-to-date charts (singles, albums, singles acts, album acts, Top 30s) listings of BPI awards, and national number ones.

From issue no. 36 (May 6, 1993) Hit Music printed the E.R.A. Top 100 Airplay charts, and from January 8, 1994 (issue no. 66) the Top 40 Network Chart (which was later called the Pepsi Chart).

In November 1994, Charts Plus ceased publication and from issue no. 111 (November 19, 1994) Hit Music printed the (uncompressed) Top 200 singles and Top 200 albums, Top 150 Artists Albums, and Top 50 Compilations. From issue no. 211 (November 2, 1996) the Artist Albums chart extended to a Top 200. Top 100 Airplay chart was dropped from issue 294 (June 20, 1998).

The last issue published was no. 439 (May 5, 2001). Hit Music folded, together with several other Music Week newsletters. This meant that there was no longer a published source for the Top 200 singles and Top 200 albums charts. However, by autumn 2001, a successor publication to Hit Music was founded, independent of Music Week, in order to publish the British Top 200 charts: ChartsPlus (not to be confused with the 1990s publication of the same name mentioned above). The ChartsPlus which was started in 2001 was renamed UKChartsPlus in 2010.

== See also ==
- UK Singles Chart
- UK Albums Chart
