= Official Subscription Plays Chart =

UK music chart

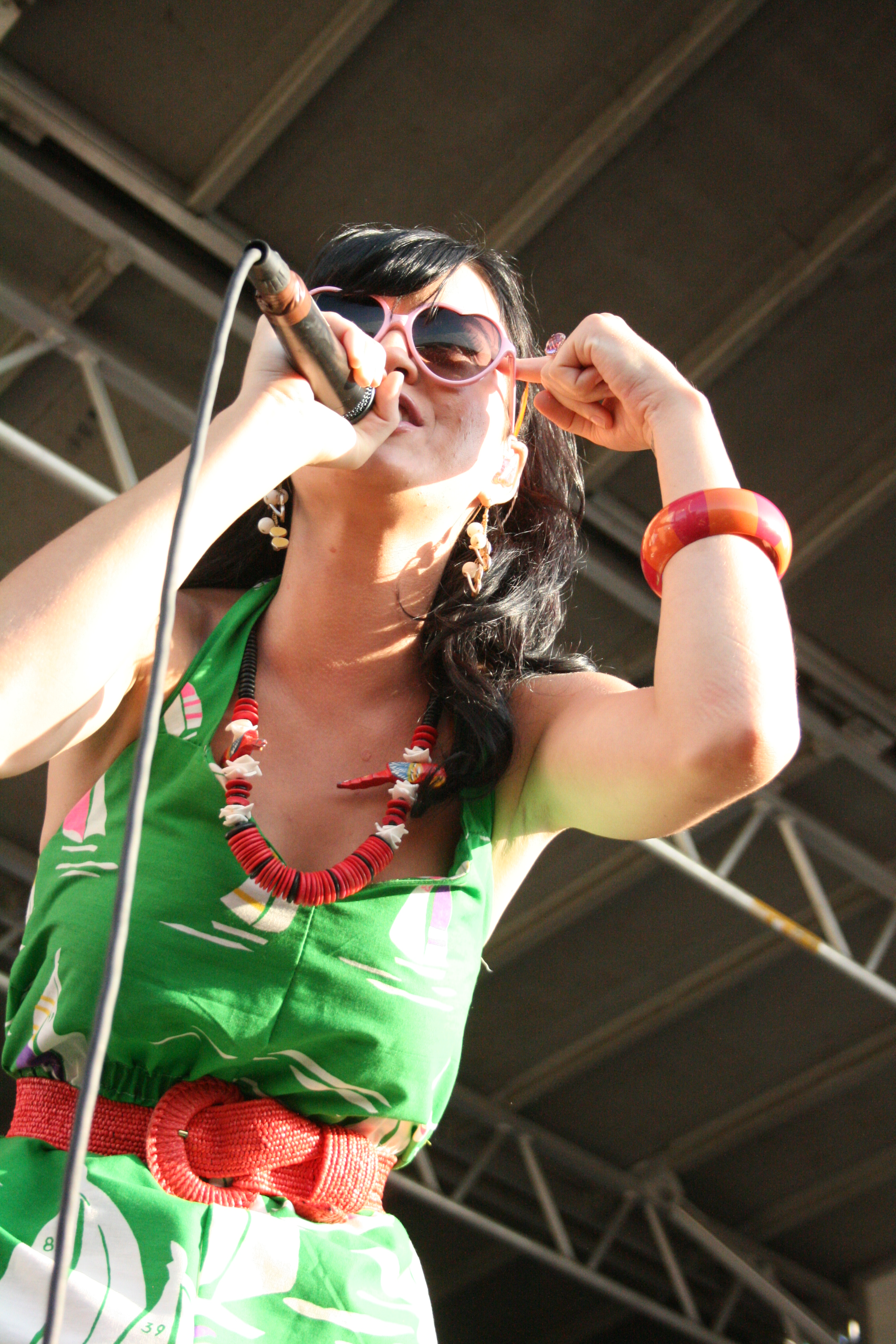
American singer Katy Perry achieved the first number one on the Official Subscription Plays Chart.

The Official Subscription Plays Chart was a music chart based on the number of plays of songs on subscription-based services in the United Kingdom. It was compiled weekly by the Official Charts Company (OCC), until November 2013. Each week's number one was published on a dedicated webpage of the OCC's official website—this webpage first went live in mid-2009.

== History ==
The Official Subscription Plays Chart was launched for the first time on 22 September 2008, for a trial period of six months. Initially, it was solely based on digital plays from the subscription services HMV, MusicStation, Napster and the Nokia Music Store, all of which charged users a monthly fee. The data that these services supplied was compiled into a record chart of the 500 most-played tracks—each week also featured top-line market statistics.

When first launched, the Official Subscription Plays Chart tracked between 3 million and 3.5 million digital plays per week (with a weekly average of more than 3.2 million), across a library of approximately 340,000 unique tracks. The first song to top the chart was "I Kissed a Girl" by Katy Perry. As well as songs that were charting high in the companion UK Singles Chart, the first ever Official Subscription Plays Chart also featured album tracks from records by bands such as Elbow, The Verve and Glasvegas. According to the British Phonographic Industry, "the Official Subscription Plays Chart underlines the greater tendency to experiment among users of subscription services".

In May 2012, the OCC launched the Official Audio Streaming Chart which was (according to the OCC Facebook page) "a much broader panel of the biggest streaming services including Spotify and Deezer. It also counts all audio streams whether that be ad-funded (e.g. free Spotify accounts), and premium subscription account streams." The two charts ran alongside each other until November 2013 when the Subscription Plays Chart was scrapped and audio streams counted towards the Official Singles Chart from July 2014.

== See also ==
- List of Official Subscription Plays Chart number ones
