= Record Mirror =

Former British weekly music newspaper

- Categories: Music, show business
- Frequency: Weekly
- Founder: Isidore Green
- First issue: 17 June 1954
- Final issue: 6 April 1991
- Company: United Newspapers
- Country: United Kingdom
- Based in: London
- Language: English
- ISSN: 0144-5804
- OCLC: 6459252

Record Mirror was a British weekly music newspaper published between 1954 and 1991, aimed at pop fans and record collectors. Launched two years after New Musical Express, it never attained the circulation of its rival. The first UK album chart was published in Record Mirror in 1956, and during the 1980s it was the only consumer music paper to carry the official UK singles and UK albums charts used by the BBC for Radio 1 and Top of the Pops, as well as the USA's Billboard charts.

The title ceased to be a stand-alone publication in April 1991 when United Newspapers closed or sold most of their consumer magazines, including Record Mirror and its sister music magazine Sounds, to concentrate on trade papers like Music Week. In 2010, Giovanni di Stefano bought the name Record Mirror and relaunched it as an online music gossip website in 2011. The website became inactive in 2013 following di Stefano's jailing for fraud.

== Early years, 1954–1963 ==
Record Mirror was founded by former Weekly Sporting Review editor Isidore Green, who encouraged the same combative journalism as NME. Staff writers included Dick Tatham, Peter Jones and Ian Dove. Green's background was in show business and he emphasised music hall, a dying tradition. He published articles and interviews connected with theatre and musical personalities.

On 22 January 1955, Record Mirror became the second music paper after NME to publish a singles chart. The chart was a Top 10, from postal returns from 24 shops. On 8 October, the chart expanded to a Top 20, and by 1956, more than 60 stores were being sampled. In April 1961, increased postage costs affected funding of the returns, and on 24 March 1962 the paper abandoned its charts and began using those of Record Retailer, which had begun in March 1960.

The first album charts in the UK were published in Record Mirror on 28 July 1956.

For two months in 1959, Record Mirror failed to appear due to a national printing strike. On its return, Green renamed it Record and Show Mirror, the majority of space devoted to show business. By the end of 1960 circulation had fallen to 18,000 and Decca Records, the main shareholder, became uneasy. In March 1961, Decca replaced Green with Jimmy Watson, a former Decca press officer. Watson changed the title to New Record Mirror and eliminated show business. Circulation rose, aided by an editorial team of Peter Jones, Ian Dove and Norman Jopling. He brought in freelance columnists James Asman, Benny Green and DJ David Gell to implement a chart coverage including jazz, country and pop music. This eventually included the official UK Top 50 singles, Top 30 LPs and Top 10 EPs, as compiled by Record Retailer. The paper also listed the USA Top 50 singles, compiled by Cash Box, and charts such as the Top 20 singles of five years ago and R&B releases.

Features such as Ian Dove's "Rhythm & Blues Round Up", Peter Jones's "New Faces" and Norman Jopling's "Fallen Idols and Great Unknowns", combined with New Record Mirror's music coverage, helped circulation rise to nearly 70,000. New Record Mirror was the first national publication to publish an article on the Beatles, and the first to feature the Rolling Stones, the Searchers, the Who, and the Kinks. Bill Harry, founder and editor of the Liverpool publication Mersey Beat, wrote a column on Liverpool music. Other columnists reported on Birmingham, Manchester, Sheffield and Newcastle. New Record Mirror took an interest in black American R&B artists. The paper maintained articles on old-style rock and roll.

== 1963–1982 ==
During 1963 Decca Records' chairman Edward Lewis sold a substantial share of Decca's interest to John Junor, editor of the Sunday Express. Junor was looking for a paper to print by four-colour printing developed by Woodrow Wyatt in Banbury, before printing the Sunday Express in colour. Junor moved Sunday Express production to Shaftesbury Avenue and New Record Mirror became more mainstream. In November 1963, the paper returned to the name Record Mirror, and featured a colour picture of the Beatles on the cover, the first music paper in full colour. Although the first run of 120,000 sold out, the following issue fell to 60,000. Junor replaced Jimmy Watson by Peter Jones. Circulation recovered and the paper successfully continued with the same format throughout the 1960s. Following acquisition in 1962 of NME by Odhams, Record Mirror was the only independent popular music newspaper.

During 1969, Record Mirror was acquired by Record Retailer and incorporated into Record Retailer offices in Carnaby Street. The acquisition saw the magazine change printers, drop full colour pin-ups and increase its size to a larger tabloid format. Jones continued as editor, supported by Valerie Mabbs, Lon Goddard, Rob Partridge, Bill McAllister (the first music journalist to herald Elton John and Rod Stewart), and broadcast-specialist Rodney Collins, who had moved from Record Retailer. Collins's links with pirate radio gave Record Mirror a continental circulation and a Dutch supplement was frequently included. Terry Chappell resumed as production editor and Bob Houston supervised the change in format. Group editorial manager Mike Hennessey contributed the first interview with John Lennon. The Record Mirror photographic studio became independent, under Dezo Hoffmann.

In a studio outtake of a recording of "Sally Simpson" on the 2003 release of the deluxe edition of the Who's 1969 album Tommy, Pete Townshend said, "I've read the Record Mirror". When Keith Moon presses him to tell what he read in the Record Mirror, Pete says, to the rest of the band's laughter, that the paper said that he was known by the other members of the Who as "Bone".

In 1975 Disc was incorporated into Record Mirror – among the items brought to Record Mirror was J Edward Oliver's cartoon, which had been running in Disc for five years, and which continued for a two years in Record Mirror. By 1977 Record Retailer had become Music Week and Record Mirror was included in a sale by Billboard magazine to the Morgan-Grampian Group. Both offices moved to Covent Garden. Morgan-Grampian moved to Greater London House, north London in 1981.

== 1982–1991 ==
In 1982, the paper changed from tabloid to glossy magazine. During the next nine years it had a more pop-orientated slant and containing features and a tone of voice that was one part Smash Hits, one part the NME. Part of Record Mirror was devoted over to comic articles as a rival to the NME's Thrills section (infamous for Stuart Maconie's Believe It Or Not column which claimed that Bob Holness was the saxophonist on Gerry Rafferty's Baker Street). Features in this section of Record Mirror included:

- Great Pop Things, a weekly comic strip by Colin B. Morton and Chuck Death which began in 1987 and continued in NME after Record Mirror's closure
- Star-spotting gossip pages, written by Johnny Dee, which also featured comedy articles
- Lip – gossip column written by Nancy Culp, and later Lisa Tilston
- "Spot the Imposter" – photoquiz with a misplaced face in the crowd
- "Phil's World of Wigs" – each week a picture of Phil Collins appeared with new novelty haircuts, the artwork being created by art director Ian Middleton in response to readers' suggestions
- "Pete's Poems" – a weekly poem by record producer Pete Waterman (as edited by Neil Wilson)
- "Sonia's Best Buys" – value for money purchases apparently made by late 1980s singer Sonia
- "The Stone Roses New Line-Up" – each week a new photo of a gurning celebrity would be added to a photo of the Stone Roses 1989 line-up, for example Harry Enfield as his character "Loadsamoney"
- "B's Cheeseboard" – various types of cheese apparently reviewed by Soul II Soul star Jazzie B
- "Star Scene" – pop stars answering questions about items in the news
- "Tanita and Guy's Psychic Joke Hut" – pictures of the heads of The House Of Love singer Guy Chadwick and singer-songwriter Tanita Tikaram telling each other jokes: both were famed for their serious natures in real life
- "Disco column" – a disco review section from James Hamilton

== 1991–2013 ==
In 1987, Morgan-Grampian was acquired by United Newspapers (now UBM). On 2 April 1991, Record Mirror closed as a stand-alone title on the same day as its United Newspapers sister publication Sounds closed, with the last issue dated 6 April 1991. The final cover featured Transvision Vamp. Eleanor Levy, the final editor, believed the decision to close the magazine was "taken by accountants rather than people who understand music. When I explained to one of the management team that our strength was dance music, he thought I meant Jive Bunny."

As United Newspapers decided to focus on trade papers, Record Mirror was incorporated into Music Week as a pull-out supplement with the title concentrating on dance music and with the Cool Cuts, Club Chart and James Hamilton's BPM column continuing to be published. Hamilton continued to review records for the Record Mirror Dance Update until two weeks before his death on 17 June 1996, with the supplement running an obituary in the 29 June issue with tributes from Pete Tong, Graham Gold and Les 'L.A. Mix' Adams.

The last edition of Record Mirror Dance Update was published on 13 February 1999, its closure being announced on the front page of the following week's edition of Music Week. Its dance charts were incorporated into Music Week (with the Music Week Upfront Club and Cool Cuts still being published in 2020 by Future plc, though this may change in 2021 when the publication goes monthly). However, in 2011 Record Mirror was re-launched as an online music gossip website but became inactive two years later following trademark owner Giovanni di Stefano's jailing for fraud.

== Music charts ==
=== History of the charts ===
Record Mirror became the second magazine to compile and publish a record chart on 22 January 1955. Unlike the New Musical Express who conducted a phone poll of retailers for a chart, Record Mirror arranged for its pool of retailers to send in a list of best sellers by post. The paper would finance the costs of this survey and by 1957 over 60 shops would be regularly contributing from a rotating pool of over 80. The chart was a top 10 until 8 October 1955. It then became a top 20; which it stayed at until being replaced by the Record Retailer top 50. It also inaugurated the country's first Long Player chart, which commenced as a top five on 28 July 1956.

By March 1962, Record Mirror adopted publication of Record Retailer's top 50 from 24 March 1962. After 21 April 1966, Record Mirror published a "Bubbling Under List" right under the main chart (at the time, the Singles Top 50, the Albums Top 30 and the EP Top 10). "The Breakers", as it was called later in the year, were 10 to 15 records (for the singles chart) which had not made the top 50 that week, but were poised to reach the main chart the next week, ranked in sales order, i.e. as if they occupied positions 51 to 64. "The Breakers" list was ceased when BMRB took over chart compilation in February 1969, but by September 1970, it was re-instated (for singles only) appearing off and on under the main chart, up until May 1978 (when the top 75 was introduced). In the years 1974 and 1975, the list even expanded to 30 titles, of which the first 10 were called "Star Breakers" and given in order of sales, with the other 20 listed alphabetically.

In January 1983, when Gallup took over chart compilation, the singles chart extended to a Top 100, with positions 76–100 as 'The Next 25' – excluding singles dropping out of the Top 75 or with significantly reduced sales. 'The Next 25' was discontinued by Music Week in November 1990 who decided to only include records that were hits (that is, inside the Top 75). Record Mirror continued printing the Top 100 until it became part of the trade paper in April 1991, with Music Week continuing to print the hits, though the full Top 200 singles chart and Top 150 albums chart could be accessed by subscribing to Music Week's spin-off newsletter Charts Plus and also to Hit Music which superseded it. (Note: As of December 2020 the Official Charts Company website is still missing a lot of the data on regards to records in positions 76 to 100 from 1991 to 12 February 1994)

In addition to the Gallup charts (the future Official Charts Company Top 100), Record Mirror was the only magazine during the 1980s to print the weekly US singles and album charts, with analysis by chart statistician Alan Jones.

=== Music charts included ===
- UK Top 100 Singles Chart
- UK Top 75 Albums and Compilation Albums Charts
- Vintage chart from a bygone year
- US Billboard Singles Chart
- US Billboard Albums Chart
- US Billboard Black Singles Chart
- Music Video Chart
- 12-inch singles Top 20 Chart
- Compact Disc Top 20 Chart
- Reggae Chart (dropped in 1987)

== James Hamilton ==
In June 1975, DJ James Hamilton (1943–1996)started writing a weekly "disco" column, which in 1980s expanded into a general dance music section known as BPM. Later, Hamilton introduced the DJ Directory, including the Beats and Pieces news section and four charts: "Club Chart", "Cool Cuts", "Pop Dance", and Hi-NRG Chart.

Hamilton had started DJing in London in the early 1960s, and had been writing about US soul and R&B for Record Mirror since 1964, originally as Dr Soul. After a visit to the Paradise Garage in the 1970s to see Larry Levan play, he came back to the UK a convert to mixing records, unknown at the time. To promote his views, he developed his onomatopoeic style of describing a record, and from 1979 he started timing and including the beats per minute of records he reviewed.

== Employees ==
=== 1950s and 1960s ===
Journalists

- Norman Jopling
- Graeme Andrews
- Derek Boltwood
- Roy Burden
- Terry Chappell
- Rodney Collins
- Lon Goddard
- David Griffiths
- Tony Hall
- Peter Jones
- Bill McAllister
- Valerie Mabbs
- Ian Middleton
- Barry May
- Alan Stinton

Photographic department

- Dezo Hoffmann
- David Louis [Louis Levy]
- Bill Williams
- Eileen Mallory
- Alan Messer
- Feri Lukas
- David Magnus
- Keith Hammett

Production Editor

- Colin Brown

=== 1970s ===
Journalists

- Barry Cain
- Ronnie Gurr
- Mike Gardner
- Jan Iles
- David Hancock
- Peter Harvey
- Tim Lott
- Alf Martin
- Mike Nicholls
- Sheila Prophet
- Rosalind Russell
- John Shearlaw
- Daniela Soave
- Penny Valentine
- Chris Westwood
- Paula Yates – wrote a column in the paper titled "Natural Blonde"

Photographic department

- Andy Phillips
- Paul Slattery

Cartoonist

Jack Edward Oliver, 1970–1977

Advert production

- Mick Hitch
- Colin Norvell-Read (Sounds/Pop Star Weekly)

=== 1980s and 1990s ===
Business team

- Mike Sharman – Publisher
- Steve Bush-Harris
- Carole Norvell-Read
- Tracey Rogers
- Geof Todd
- Jo Embleton

Journalists

- Stuart Bailie – now a DJ on BBC Radio Ulster
- Tony Beard
- Edwin J Bernard – later became a writer and policy consultant for the human rights of HIV-affected people
- Graham Black
- Lysette Cohen
- Nancy Culp (real name Gill Smith, 1957–2009) – formerly a press officer for Rough Trade Records before moving into journalism: it was Morrissey (of Rough Trade artists The Smiths) who affectionately nicknamed her after The Beverley Hillbillies actress Nancy Kulp. Culp was also responsible for Record Mirror's gossip column Lip for much of the latter half of the 1980s before moving to the NME. She died from cancer on 6 April 2009.
- Johnny Dee
- Charlie Dick
- Ian Dickson
- Alan Entwistle
- Tony Farsides – later became editor of the Record Mirror supplement in Music Week
- Malu Halasa
- James Hamilton – he also worked for Jocks magazine (which became DJ Magazine).
- Tim Jeffries – became editor of Jocks and oversaw the transformation to DJ Mag
- Alan Jones – continues to write chart-based columns for "Music Week"
- Eleanor Levy – editor, 1989–1991. When Record Mirror closed down she and Andy Strickland (both keen football fans) co-founded the now-defunct football magazine 90 Minutes
- Vie Marshall
- Roger Morton – became manager of the band Razorlight
- Lesley O'Toole
- Betty Page (real name Beverley Glick) – editor, 1986–1989. Started her career as the secretary to Sounds' editor in 1977 before graduating to interviewing musicians for the paper, moving to Record Mirror in the early 1980s. It was at this time that she became a well-known face on the London club scene and began calling herself "Betty Page" after the 1950s model Bettie Page – she and her friend Nancy Culp were known as the "Rubber Goddesses" as they often dressed in fetish outfits, and both appeared as models on the front cover of the second issue of the fetish magazine Skin Two in 1984. At the end of the decade she moved on first to the NME, and then left the music business altogether to write for The Observer and The Sunday Express. She now runs her own business as a life coach for women.
- Pete Paisley
- Robin Smith
- Andy Strickland – combined journalism with his other job as guitarist for indie rock bands The Loft and later The Caretaker Race. Later edited the online music magazine Dotmusic.
- Lisa Tilston
- Chris Twomey
- David Whitelock – Later on managed indie/punk-funk band APB and others. Partner in Voice studios in 1989–92, Music Industry Consultant for government for four years, programmer at Lemon Tree in Aberdeen in 1999. Founded Vibraphonic (festival) in 2003 and radio station of same name in 2004, station now morphed into PhonicFM in 2007. Headed up Festivals and Event teams for both City Of Exeter and Bristol 2003–08. Now lives in Canada.
- Jane Wilkes – wrote for RM between 1986 and 1988 before going into P.R. at Polydor Records. Formed own company, Monkey Business P.R. with Pippa Hall in 1997.

Photographers

- Kevin Murphy
- Parker (aka Stephen Parker, now a DJ under the name Spoonful Sound System)
- Joe Shutter

== See also ==
- UK Singles Chart
- Hit Music
- Music Week
