= Music Week =

Trade paper for the UK record industry

- Cover of the December 2024 issue, featuring Linkin Park
- Head of Content: George Garner
- Former editors: Tom Pakinkis, Tim Ingham, David Dalton, Steve Redmond, Selina Webb, Ajax Scott, Martin Talbot, Paul Williams, Mark Sutherland
- Categories: Business
- Frequency: Before March 2021: Weekly; From March 2021: Monthly
- Format: B4
- Circulation: Not publicly available since 2011
- Founded: 1959; 67 years ago (as Record Retailer)
- First issue: 18 March 1972; 53 years ago (as Music Week)
- Company: Future
- Country: United Kingdom
- Based in: London
- Language: English
- Website: www.musicweek.com
- ISSN: 0265-1548 (print); 2052-2371 (web)
- OCLC: 750494535

Music Week is a trade publication for the UK record industry distributed via a website and a monthly print magazine. It is published by Future.

== History ==
Founded in 1959 as Record Retailer, it relaunched on 18 March 1972 as Music Week. On 17 January 1981, the title again changed, owing to the increasing importance of sell-through videos, to Music & Video Week. The rival Record Business, founded in 1978 by Brian Mulligan and Norman Garrod, was absorbed into Music Week in February 1983. Later that year, the offshoot Video Week launched and the title of the parent publication reverted to Music Week.

Since April 1991, Music Week has incorporated Record Mirror, initially as a 4 or 8-page chart supplement, later as a dance supplement of articles, reviews and charts. In the 1990s, several magazines and newsletters become part of the Music Week family: Music Business International (MBI), Promo, MIRO Future Hits, Tours Report, Fono, Green Sheet, ChartsPlus (published from May 1991 to November 1994), and Hit Music (September 1992 to May 2001). By May 2001, all newsletters (except Promo) closed.

In 2003, Music Week relaunched its website of daily news, features, record release listings and UK sales, airplay and club charts. In early 2006, a separate free-to-access site for the Music Week Directory listed 10,000 contacts in the UK music industry. In mid-2007, the magazine was redesigned by London company This Is Real Art. In October 2008, another redesign led to major changes.

In June 2011, Music Week was sold to Intent Media. The package was sold for £2.4m and also contained titles Television Broadcast Europe, Pro Sound News, Installation Europe, and additional websites, newsletters, conferences, show dailies and awards events, which generated £5.4m of revenue in 2010. As of issue 30 July 2011, UBM is still named as publisher, as the new publisher Intent Media took over on 1 August 2011. In the first edition under new ownership it was announced that the title would switch its day of publication Monday to Thursday with immediate effect. NewBay Media acquired Intent Media in 2012. Future acquired NewBay Media in 2018 and decided that the publication would go monthly from March 2021, in keeping with its Louder Sound publications such as Metal Hammer and Classic Rock magazine.

== Charts ==
Music Week features these British charts: the Official Top 75 Singles of the month, the Official Top 75 Albums of the month (similar to charts used by Top of the Pops in the early 1990s and Absolute 80s on Sundays) and the Official Vinyl Charts. Specialist charts include the Official Top 20 Americana, the Official Top 20 Classical, the Official Top 20 Hip-Hop & R&B, the Official Top 20 Jazz, the Official Top 20 Country, the Official Top 20 Dance, the Official Top 20 Folk and the Official Top 20 Rock & Metal. Also found in Music Week are charts for streaming and various album compilations, whilst James Masterton's weekly Official UK chart analysis column can now only be accessed online by subscribers.

When the magazine was a weekly publication, it included Top 75 Singles, Top 75 Artist Albums, Top 10 Downloads, Top 20 Ringtones, Top 20 Compilation Albums, Top 50 Radio Airplay, Top 40 TV airplay, and a number of format and genre charts (Music DVD, Classical, Rock, etc.), as well as a background on sales and airplay analysis from Alan Jones. Following a redesign in October 2008, the magazine introduced live charts based on Tixdaq data, a Box Office chart, and predictive charts based on information from: Rakuten.co.uk, Amazon, Shazam, Last.fm, HMV.

Music Week compiled and published weekly club charts from chart returns supplied by DJs in nightclubs; Upfront Club Top 40, Commercial Pop Top 30 and Urban Top 30. The magazine also published a weekly Cool Cuts chart compiled from DJ feedback and sales reports from independent record shops, which traced it roots back to James Hamilton's BPM section in Record Mirror (a publication which ended up as the middle dance music section of Music Week in 1991).

=== Music Week Charts Analysis ===
Although the magazine is a monthly publication, the website still posts weekly Charts Analysis pages for the UK Official Singles and Albums charts. Alan Jones was the writer of the section until he retired in March 2020, when Chart Watch UK writer James Masterton was hired to take over the role. Masterton wrote two weekly Charts Analysis pages for the website (as the magazine now features charts compiled from monthly sales and streams) until 29 October 2021, when Music Week staff performed the role. After Andre Paine and Ben Homewood wrote one each of the Charts Analysis posts on 5 November 2021, Alan Jones resumed the role again, writing the 12 November overviews, with no explanation of why he returned (with the pages titled "Charts analysis: ABBA's Voyage opens with huge sale of 204,000" for the albums and "Charts analysis: Adele spends fourth week at summit ahead of album release" for the singles).

== Publishing details ==
Music Week is published monthly by Future (from the March 2021 edition), though previously it was a weekly magazine (50 editions p.a.). It was available as a B4-sized printed magazine and a PDF digital edition. ISSN 0265-1548.

=== Editorial staff ===
As of July 2021 print edition

- Head of Content: George Garner
- Features Editor: Ben Homewood
- Digital Editor: Andre Paine
- Content Editor/Producer: Lucy Thraves
- Charts & Data: Isabelle Nesmon
- Art Editor: Steve Newman

Former editors

- Tom Pakinkis
- Tim Ingham
- David Dalton
- Steve Redmond
- Selina Webb
- Ajax Scott
- Martin Talbot
- Paul Williams
- Mark Sutherland

=== Circulation ===
The weekly print circulation in 1997/98 was 12,503, but by the time the publication left the ABC scheme in 2011 it had fallen to around 5,000 weekly copies. In October 2011, Music Week deregistered with ABC after 54 years of membership.

The website musicweek.com had 63,904 monthly unique browsers for the audited period 1–31 October 2008. By 2009, the website had been deregistered with ABC.

== See also ==
- UK singles chart
- Charts Plus
- UKChartsPlus
- Hit Music
- Record Retailer
- Record Mirror
