= The Virgin Book of British Hit Singles =

Music reference book

- Editor: Martin Roach
- Language: English
- Series: Books of British Hit Singles Franchise (Previously Guinness)
- Subject: Chart Compilation
- Publisher: Virgin Books
- Publication date: 2008-11-06
- Media type: Paperback
- Pages: 672
- ISBN: 978-0-7535-1537-2
- OCLC: 241032346
- Preceded by: Guinness Book of British Hit Singles & Albums 19th Ed.

The Virgin Book of British Hit Singles is a charts reference book published in October 2008. It replaced the Guinness Book of British Hit Singles & Albums, after the Guinness World Records brand was sold to The Jim Pattison Group (owner of Ripley's Believe It or Not!), who decided that UK chart books were not a core part of their new global acquisition (especially as the contract was due to expire anyway). The last edition was published by Guinness World Records in 2006 and covered all chart hits between 1952-2005. Two years later Ebury Publishing/Random House took over the contract from The Official Charts Company to publish the re-branded version of the book under their Virgin Books brand. Published as The Virgin Book of British Hit Singles in November 2008 without the album charts information (as the Virgin/Official Hit Albums book was to follow in 2009), but with the data pertaining to the EP chart (as featured in Record Retailer in separate listings to the standard singles chart), published between March 1960 and December 1967. The Virgin Book of British Hit Singles was last updated in 2010 with Volume 2 being edited by Dave McAleer, Andy Gregory and Matthew White.

== Content ==
The first edition of the book lists every act to have a chart hit in the UK top 75 singles chart between 1952-2008 (first quarter of the year). Unlike its predecessor, it only lists the chart weeks spent in the top 40 if the single has ever charted high enough during its chart run to do so, while Guinness listed all weeks spent in the top 75. Selected acts have a mini-biography with their entry in the book, while other sections of the book have reports on the charts, such as how they have changed due to the event of digital downloads having an effect.

The main section of the book contains the Top 75 UK hit singles, which are separated into the artists; solo singers, duets, groups and bands. The song titles, along with the highest UK Chart position, and number of weeks in Top 40 are included. The first edition featured this information along, with a list of all the songs in an A-Z list at the end of the book, for easy reference.

The second edition of the book, referred to as 'Volume 2', was published in 2010 and had a number of changes, including the addition of a new section listing all the UK No. 1 singles from 1952 until the book was completed in early 2010.

It also gave more information about each artist underneath their names, such as the lead singer, the year of birth, nationalities and a brief history or overview. This information is similar to that seen in the Guinness UK hit singles and album books.
